= Huari =

Huari may refer to:

- Huari culture, a historical civilization in Peru
- Huari (archaeological site), an archaeological site in Peru
- Huari, Peru, a town in Peru
- Huari District, a district in the Huari Province, Peru
- Huari Province, a province in the Ancash Region, Peru
- Huari, another name for the Aikanã people of Brazil
- Huari language, a language of Brazil

== See also ==
- Wari (disambiguation)
