= Olluquito =

Peruvian stew

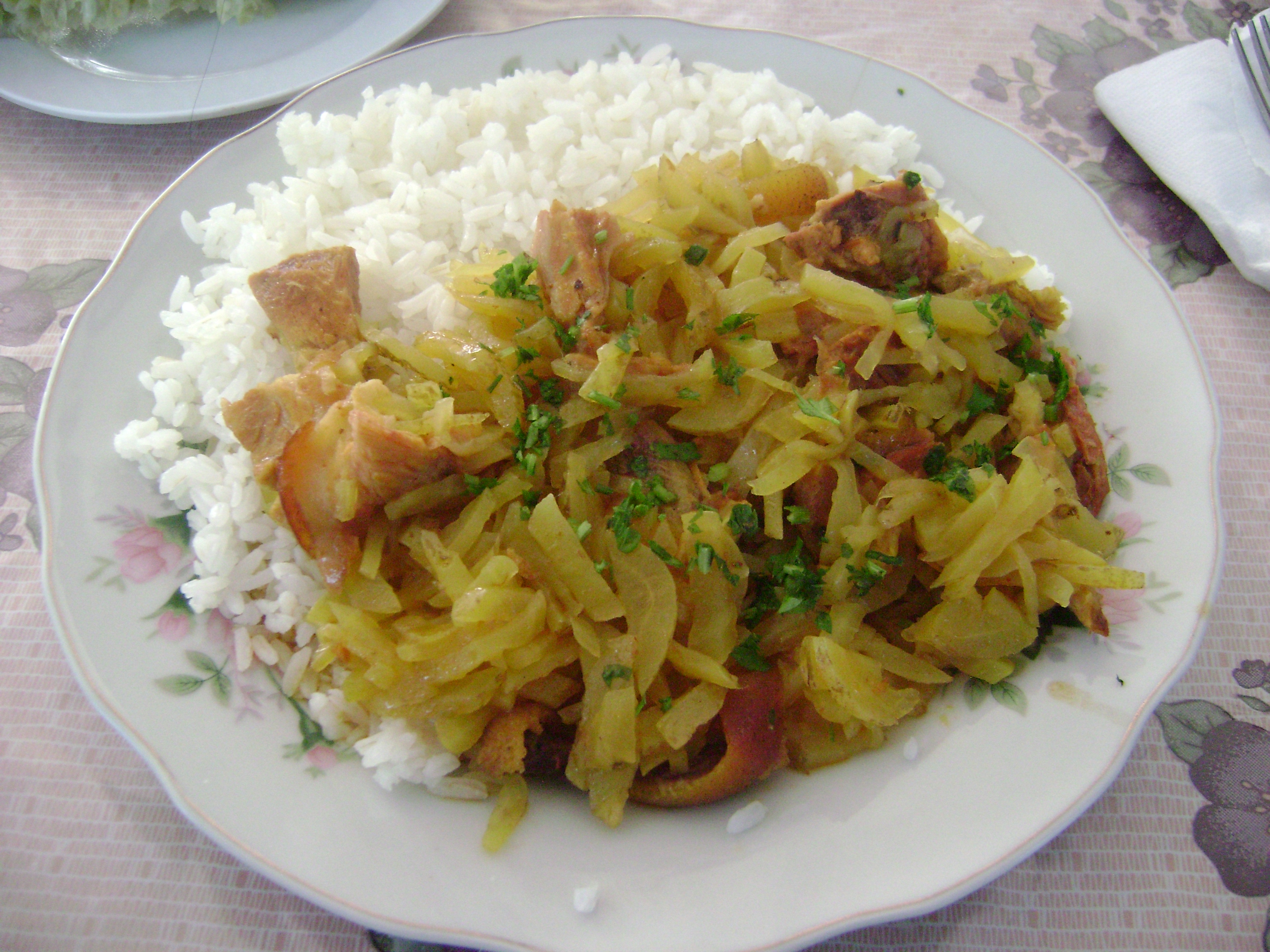
Olluquito with pork (con cerdo) and white rice from the Uco District, Huari Province, Ancash, Peru

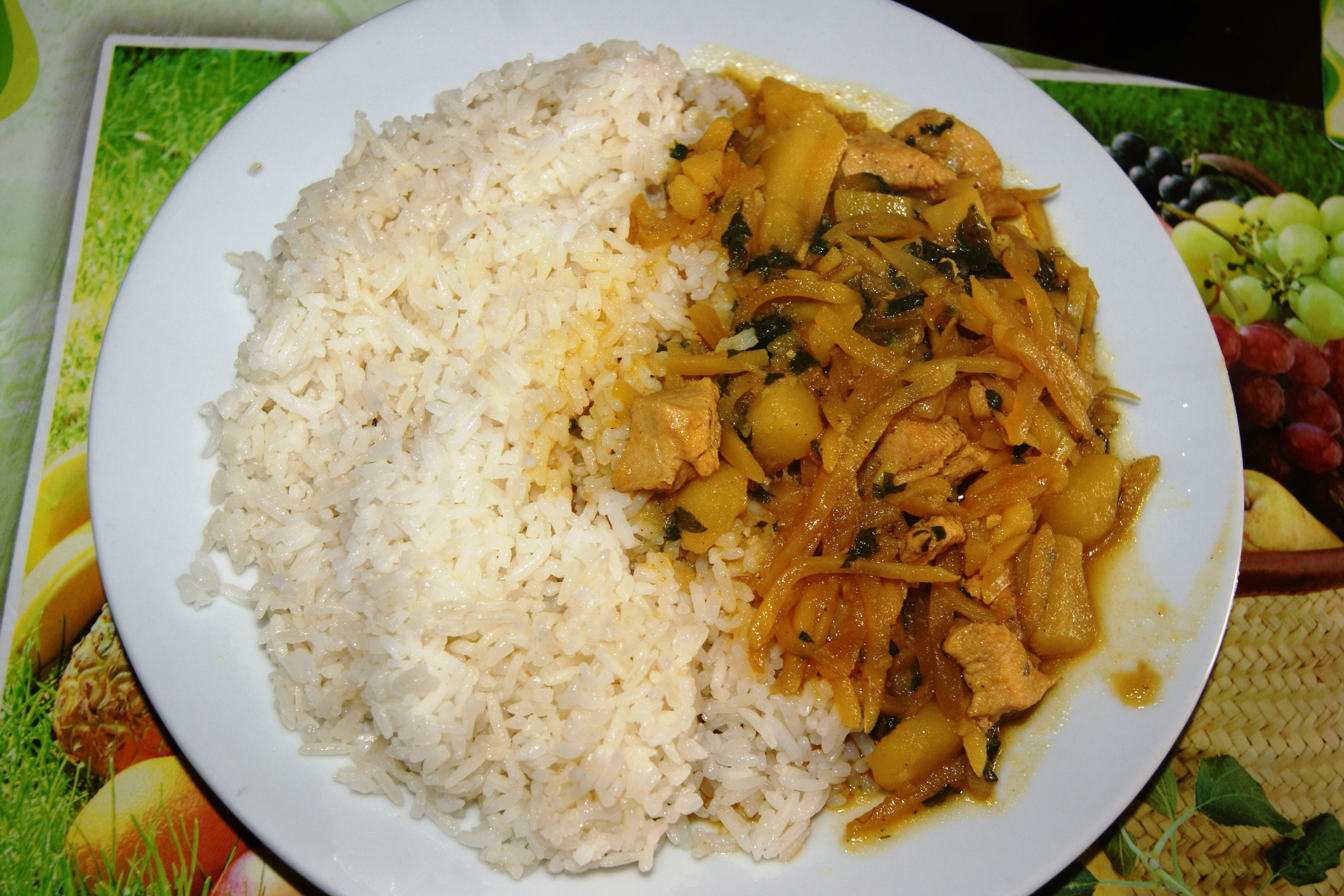
Olluquito with chicken and white rice from Lima, Peru

Olluquito, olluquito con carne (with meat) and olluquito con ch'arki (with dried llama meat) are traditional dishes in Peruvian cuisine made with ulluku (Quechua, hispanicized spellings ulluco, olluco) a root vegetable that also has edible leaves. It is an important root crop in the Andean region of South America, second only to the potato. The leaf and the tuber are edible; the leaves are similar to spinach, and the root is like a potato or jicama. The Ulluku contains high levels of protein, calcium, and carotene. Papalisa were used by the Incas prior to arrival of Europeans in South America. It can be served with meat.

Ch'arki is the technique employed in the Andean highlands to cure meat by salting, then dehydration. Incidentally the word "jerky" in English is derived from this Andean (Quechua) word. The dish is a stew of finely diced ulluku with ch'arki pieces (traditionally alpaca, or less frequently llama meat, though today it is also very commonly made from sheep), served with white rice.

== Usage ==
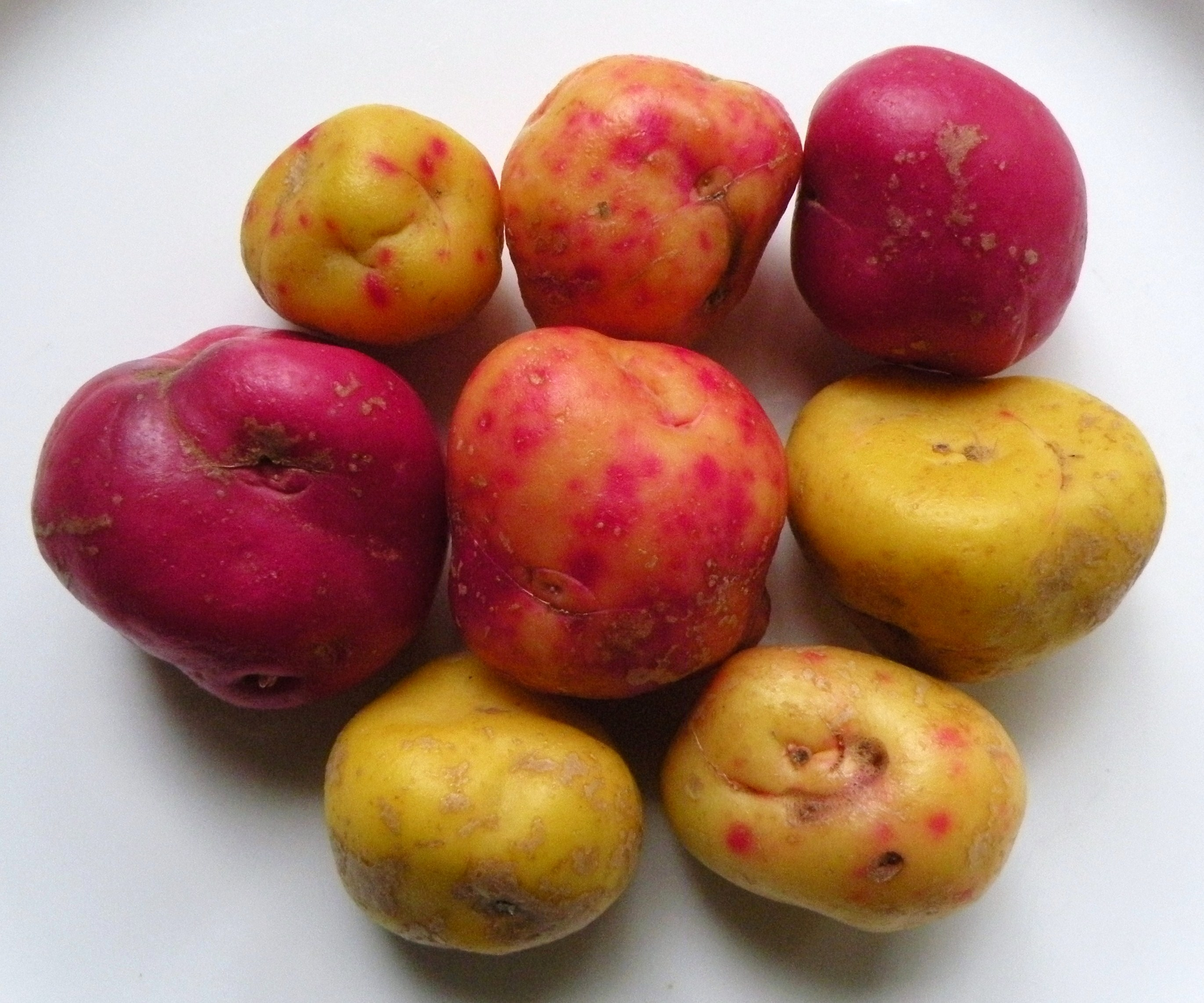
Ulluco tubers in New Zealand

The major appeal of the ulluku is its crisp texture which remains even when cooked. Because of its high water content, the ulluku is not suitable for frying or baking but it can be cooked in many other ways like the potato. In the pickled form, it is added to hot sauces. Together with the mashua it is used the Colombian cuisine dish cocido boyacense.
