= Jatunjirca (Huari) =

Mountain in Peru

- Location within Peru

Highest point
- Elevation: 3,800 m (12,500 ft)
- Coordinates: 9°22′52″S 77°10′57″W

Geography
- Location: Peru, Ancash Region
- Parent range: Andes, Cordillera Blanca

Jatunjirca (possibly from Quechua hatun big, Ancash Quechua hirka mountain) is a mountain in the eastern part of the Cordillera Blanca in the Andes of Peru which reaches a height of approximately 3,800 m (12,500 ft). It is located in the Ancash Region, Huari Province, Huari District, southwest of Huari and west of the village of Yacya.
