= Markahirka =

Archaeological site in Peru

- Marcajirca
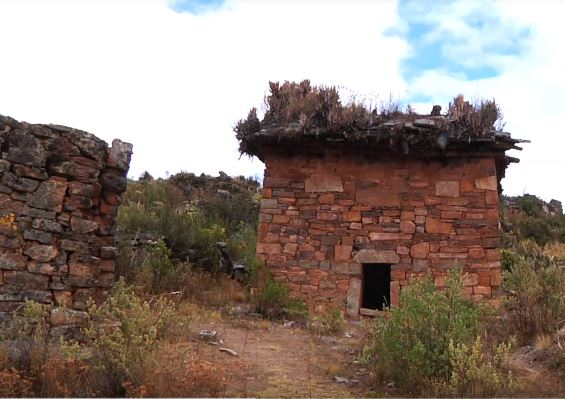
- Main chullpa in Markahirka, 2013.
- Interactive map of Markahirka
- 9°22′14.65″S 77°7′47.50″W
- Location: Peru, Ancash Region, Huari Province

Site notes
- Height: 3,580 metres (11,745 ft)
- Area: 13 ha (32 acres)

Markahirka or Marka Hirka (Quechua marka village, Ancash Quechua hirka mountain, "village mountain", Hispanicized spellings Marca Jirca, Marcajirca) is an archaeological site with cave paintings and stone tombs (chullpa) on a mountain of the same name in Peru. It is located in the Ancash Region, Huari Province, in the districts of Cajay and Masin. It is situated at a height of 3,580 metres (11,745 ft). Markahirka is also a good viewpoint with views into the Puchka valley (Puchca) and to the towns of Huari (Wari) and Huachis (Wachis).
