= Yanaccacca =

Yanaccacca (possibly from Quechua yana black, qaqa rock, "black rock") may refer to:

- Yanaccacca (Ancash), a mountain in Ancash, Peru
- Yanaccacca (Moquegua), a mountain in Moquegua, Peru
