= Puka Mach'ay (disambiguation) =

Puka Mach'ay (Quechua puka red, mach'ay cave, "red caave", also spelled Puca Machay, Pucamachay) may refer to:

- Puka Mach'ay, a mountain in the Ancash Region, Peru
- Puka Mach'ay (Junín), a mountain in the Junín Region, Peru
- Puka Mach'ay (Pasco), a mountain in the Pasco Region, Peru
