= Pucaraju (Huari) =

Mountain in Peru

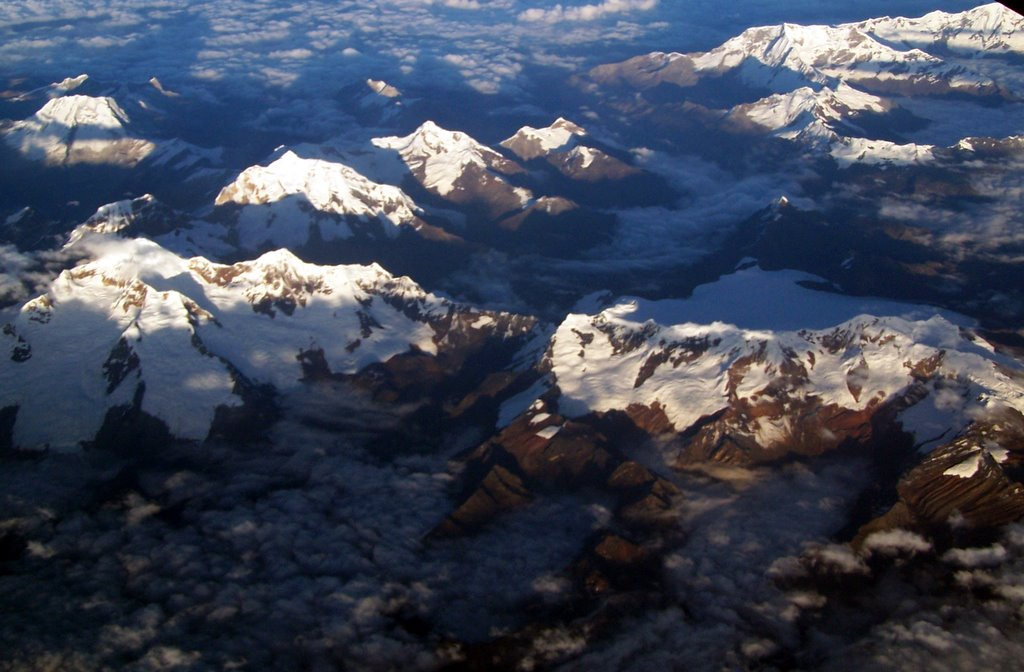
- Aerial view of the Cordillera Blanca as seen from the east with Pucaraju in the lower right center

Highest point
- Elevation: 4,800 m (15,700 ft)
- Coordinates: 9°19′38″S 77°16′40″W

Geography
- Location within Peru
- Location: Peru, Ancash Region
- Parent range: Andes, Cordillera Blanca

Pucaraju (possibly from Quechua puka red, rahu snow, ice, mountain with snow, "red snow-covered mountain") is a mountain in the Cordillera Blanca in the Andes of Peru, about 4,800 m (15,748 ft) high. It is situated in the Ancash Region, Huari Province, Huari District. Pucaraju lies on a ridge east of Jacabamba.
