= Challwaqucha =

Challwaqucha (Quechua challwa fish, qucha lake, "fish lake", also spelled Chalhuaccocha, Chalhuacocha, Chalhuajocha, Challhuacocha) may refer to:

- Challwaqucha (Ancash), a lake in the Pallasca Province, Ancash Region, Peru
- Challwaqucha (Cajatambo-Oyón), a mountain on the border of the Cajatambo Province and the Oyón Province in the Lima Region, Peru
- Challwaqucha (Cusco), a lake in the Cusco Region, Peru
- Challwaqucha (Huaral), a lake in the Huaral Province, Lima Region, Peru
- Challwaqucha (Huari), a lake in the Huari Province, Ancash Region, Peru
- Challwaqucha (Junín), a lake in the Junín Region, Peru
- Challwaqucha (Yauli), a mountain in the Yauli Province, Junín Region
- Challwaqucha (Yauyos), a lake in the Yauyos Province, Lima Region, Peru
