= Runtuy (Huari) =

Mountain in Peru

- Location within Peru

Highest point
- Elevation: 4,000 m (13,000 ft)
- Coordinates: 9°18′37″S 77°11′28″W

Geography
- Location: Peru, Ancash Region
- Parent range: Andes, Cordillera Blanca

Runtuy (Quechua for "to hail" or "to lay an egg") is a mountain in the eastern extensions of the Cordillera Blanca in the Andes of Peru which reaches a height of approximately 4,000 m (13,000 ft). It is located in the Ancash Region, Huari Province, Huari District, northwest of Huari.
