= List of political entities in the 11th century =

This is a list of political entities in the 11th century (1001–1100) AD. It includes both sovereign states and any political predecessors of current sovereign states.

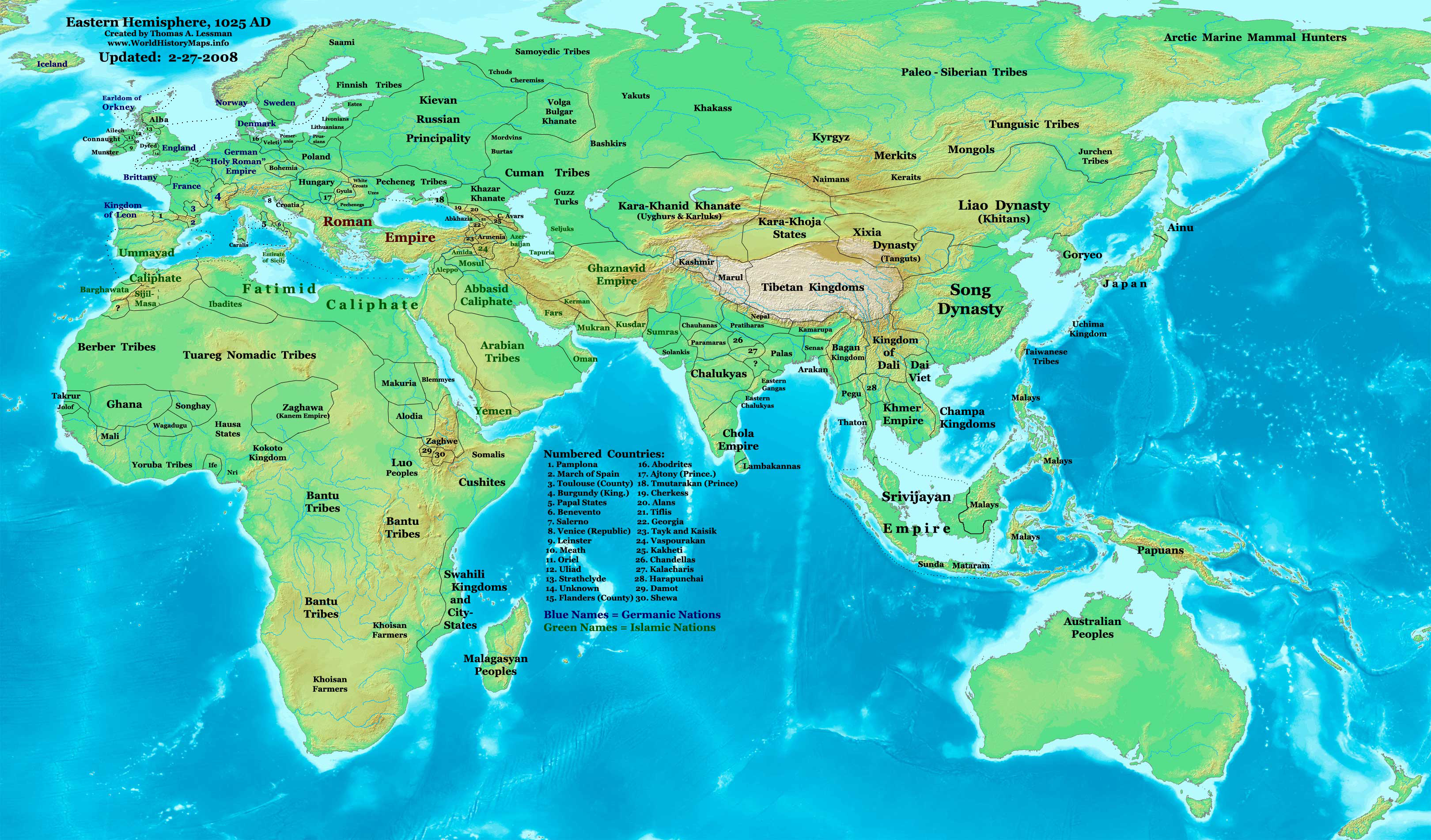
Map of the Eastern Hemisphere in 1025 AD

== Political entities ==
Flag	Name	Capital(s)	State type	Existed	Location
	Abbasid Caliphate	No official	Empire	750 – 1256 AD	Africa: North; Asia: West
(Fatimid Caliphate)	Fatimid Caliphate	Various	Empire	909 – 1171 AD	Africa: North; Asia: West
	Kanem Empire	Njimi	Empire	c. 700 – 1387 AD	Africa: North-central
	Alodia	Soba	Empire	680 – 1504 AD	Africa: Northeast
	Makuria	Dongola	Kingdom	340 – 1312 AD	Africa: Northeast
	Kingdom of Mapungubwe	Not specified	Kingdom	1075 – 1220 AD	Africa: Southern
	Ghana Empire	Koumbi Saleh	Empire	c. 400 – 1235 AD	Africa: West
	Kingdom of Nri	Igbo-Ukwu	Kingdom	948 – 1911 AD	Africa: West
	Zapotec	Various	Kingdom City States	700 BC – 1521 AD	Americas: Central
	Pueblo	Various	Tribal chiefdoms	12th century BC – 14th century AD	Americas: North
	Cañari	Tumebamba	Tribal Confederacy	500 – 1533 AD	Americas: South
	Wari Empire	Huari	Empire	500 – 1100 AD	Americas: South
(Byzantine Empire)	Byzantine Empire	Constantinople	Empire	395 – 1453 AD	Europe: Balkans, Asia: West; Africa: Northeast
	First Bulgarian Empire	Various	Empire	681 – 1018 AD	Europe: Balkans
	Kingdom of Croatia	Various	Kingdom	925 - 1102 AD	Europe: Balkans
(Kingdom of Hungary)	Kingdom of Hungary	Budapest, Pécs	Kingdom	1000 – 1946 AD	Europe: Balkans
	Travunija	Trebinje	Principality/client	850 – 1482 AD	Europe: Balkans
	Ailech	Grianán Ailigh	Kingdom	450 – 1283 AD	Europe: British Isles
	Airgíalla	Clogher	Tribal Federation/Kingdom	331 – 1590 AD	Europe: British Isles
	Kingdom of Alba	Clogher	Kingdom	900 – 1286 AD	Europe: British Isles
	Kingdom of Breifne	Dromahair	Kingdom	700 – 1256 AD	Europe: British Isles
	Brycheiniog	Talgarth	Kingdom	450 – 1045 AD	Europe: British Isles
	Connacht		Tribal chiefdom/kingdom	c. 10th century BC – 1474 AD	Europe: British Isles
(Kingdom of England)	Kingdom of England	Winchester, London	Kingdom	927 – 1707 AD	Europe: British Isles
	Kingdom of Galloway		Kingdom	c. 1000 – 1234 AD	Europe: British Isles
	Glywysing	Cardiff	Kingdom	490 – 1063 AD	Europe: British Isles
	Gwent	Caerwent, Porth-is-Coed	Kingdom	420 – 1081 AD	Europe: British Isles
	Gwynedd	Various	Kingdom	420 – 1261 AD	Europe: British Isles
	Leinster		Kingdom	436 – 1632 AD	Europe: British Isles
	Kingdom of the Isles		Kingdom	848 – 1266 AD	Europe: British Isles
	Meath	Dublin	Kingdom	1st century – 1173 AD	Europe: British Isles
	Mormaer of Moray		Kingdom	c. 970 – 1130 AD	Europe: British Isles
	Osraige	Kilkenny	Kingdom	150 – 1185 AD	Europe: British Isles
	Powys	Various	Kingdom	488 – 1160 AD	Europe: British Isles
	Kingdom of Scotland	Stirling, Edinburgh	Kingdom	843 – 1707 AD	Europe: British Isles
	Strathclyde	Dumbarton, Govan	Kingdom	450 – 1093 AD	Europe: British Isles
	Tyrconnell	Dun na nGall	Kingdom	464 – 1607 AD	Europe: British Isles
	Uí Failghe	Rathangan, Daingean	Kingdom	507 – 1550 AD	Europe: British Isles
	Ulster		Kingdom	465 – 1177 AD	Europe: British Isles
	Wessex	Winchester	Kingdom	519 – 1018 AD	Europe: British Isles
	Cumania	Not specified	Nomadic confederation	900 – 1220 AD	Europe: East; Asia: Central
	Khazar Khaganate	Various	Nomadic Kingdom	618 – 1048 AD	Europe: East; Asia, Central; Eurasian: Caucasus
	Kievan Rus'	Kiev	Federated principalities	882 – 1283 AD	Europe: East
	Volga Bulgaria	Bolghar, Bilär	Kingdom	660 – 1236 AD	Europe: East
	Denmark	Roskilde	Kingdom	c. 900 – present	Europe: Nordic
	Icelandic Commonwealth	Þingvellir	Commonwealth (federation)	930 – 1262 AD	Europe: Nordic
(Norway)	Norway	Oslo	Kingdom	872 AD – present	Europe: Nordic
(Sweden)	Sweden	Sigtuna	Kingdom	c. 970 – present	Europe: Nordic
	Principality/ Duchy of Benevento	Benevento	Dukedom/Principality/Client	571 – 1074 AD	Europe: South
(Republic of Genoa)	Republic of Genoa	Genoa	Republic	1005 – 1797 AD	Europe: South
(Papal States)	Papal States	Rome	Pontifical states	754 – 1870 AD	Europe: South
	San Marino	San Marino	Republic	301 AD – present	Europe: South
	Duchy of Tridentum	Trento	Dukedom/Principality	574 – 1802 AD	Europe: South
(Republic of Venice)	Republic of Venice	Venice	Republic	697 – 1797 AD	Europe: South
	Armorica		Kingdom/dukedom	343 – 1532 AD	Europe: West
	Viscounty of Béarn	Various	Viscounty	9th century – 1620 AD	Europe: West
	Duchy of Brittany	Various	Dukedom	939 – 1547 AD	Europe: West
	Duchy of Burgundy	Dijon	Dukedom	1032 – 1477 AD	Europe: West
	Caliphate of Córdoba	Córdoba	Kingdom	929 – 1031 AD	Europe: West
	Cornouaille		Principality	430 – 1084 AD	Europe: West
	County of Flanders	Various	Countship	862 – 1795 AD	Europe: West
(Kingdom of France)	Kingdom of France	Paris, Versailles	Kingdom	843 – 1792 AD	Europe: West
(Kingdom of Galicia)	Kingdom of Galicia	Santiago de Compostela	Kingdom	409 – 1833 AD	Europe: West
	Guelders	Geldern	Countship/dukedom	1096 – 1795 AD	Europe: West
	County of Holland	The Hague	Countship	11th century – 1795 AD	Europe: West
(Holy Roman Empire)	Holy Roman Empire	Frankfurt	Empire	962 – 1806 AD	Europe: West, South
	Kingdom of León	Leon	Kingdom	910 – 1230 AD	Europe: West
(Lorraine)	Duchy of Lorraine	Nancy	Dukedom	959 – 1766 AD	Europe: West
	Kingdom of Navarre	Pamplona	Kingdom	824 – 1620 AD	Europe: West
	Duchy of Normandy	Rouen	Duchy	911 – 1259 AD	Europe: West
	Raetia Curiensis	Chur	Bishopric (religious state)	452 – 1160 AD	Europe: West
	Taifa	Various	Confederation of kingdoms/principalities	1011 – 1571 AD	Europe: West
	Duchy of Thuringia		Duchy	631 – 1440 AD	Europe: West
	Kingdom of Georgia	Kutaisi, Tbilisi	Kingdom	1008 – 1491 AD	Eurasian: Caucasus
	Sarir	Humraj	Kingdom/Client	453 – 12th century AD	Eurasian: Caucasus
	Kara-Khanid Khanate	Balasagun, Kashgar, Samarkand	Nomadic confederation	840 – 1212 AD	Asia: Central
	Khotan	Khotan	Kingdom	56 – 1006 AD	Asia: Central
	Tatar confederation	Not specified	Confederation	8th century – 1202 AD	Asia: Central
	Principality of Antioch	Antioch	Principality/Crusader state	1098 – 1268 AD	Asia: West
	County of Edessa	Edessa, Turbessel	Countship	1098 – 1150 AD	Asia: West
	Principality of Galilee	Tiberias	Principality/client	1099 – 1187 AD	Asia: West
(Kingdom of Jerusalem)	Kingdom of Jerusalem	Jerusalem	Kingdom	1099 – 1291 AD	Asia: West
	Nizari Ismaili state	Alamut Castle	Not specified	1090 – 1256 AD	Asia: West
	Sultanate of Rum	Nicaea, Iconium	Sultanate	1077 – 1307 AD	Asia: West
	Uyunid Emirate	Al Hasa, Awal, Qatif	Emirate	1076 – 1253 AD	Asia: West
	Anuradhapura Kingdom	Anuradhapura	Kingdom	377 BC – 1017 AD	Asia: South
	Ay	Aykudi	Kingdom	4th century BC – 12th century AD	Asia: South
	Kingdom of Bumthang	Chakhar Gutho	Kingdom	7th – 17th centuries AD	Asia: South
	Chera Kingdom		Kingdom	5th century BC – 1102 AD	Asia: South
	Eastern Chalukyas	Vengi, Rajamundry	Kingdom	624 – 1129 AD	Asia: South
Princely State of Tehri Garhwal	Garhwal Kingdom	Various	Kingdom	888 – 1949 AD	Asia: South
	Ghurid dynasty	Various	Sultanate	879 – 1215 AD	Asia: South, West, Central
	Gurjara-Pratihara	Kannauj	Empire	650 – 1036 AD	Asia: South
	Kabul Shahi	Kabul, Waihind	Kingdom/Empire	6th century – 1026 AD	Asia: South
	Kamarupa	Various	Kingdom	350 – 1140 AD	Asia: South
	Rajarata	Various	Kingdom	377 BC – 1310 AD	Asia: South
	Sirmoor State	Sirmür	Principality	1095 – 1948 AD	Asia: South
	Bruneian Empire	Various	Empire	7th century – 1888 AD	Asia: Southeast
	Kingdom of Butuan	Butuan	Kingdom	before 1001 – 1521 AD	Asia: Southeast
	Champa	Various	Kingdom	192 – 1832 AD	Asia: Southeast
	Gangga Negara	Gangga Negara	Kingdom	2nd – 11th centuries AD	Asia: Southeast
(Khmer Empire)	Khmer Empire	Yaśodharapura (Angkor)	Empire	802 – 1431 AD	Asia: Southeast
	Langkasuka	Kedah, Pattani	Kingdom	100 – 1516 AD	Asia: Southeast
	Lavo Kingdom	Lavo, Ayodhaya	Kingdom	450 – 1388 AD	Asia: Southeast
	Đại Việt	Thăng Long	Kingdom	1054 – 1400 AD	Asia: Southeast, Vietnam
	Melayu Kingdom	Jambi	Kingdom	4th – 13th centuries AD	Asia: Southeast
	Pyu city-states	Sri Ksetra	Federated City States	250 BC – 1085 AD	Asia: Southeast
	Sunda Kingdom	Various	Kingdom	669 – 1579 AD	Asia: Southeast
	Thaton Kingdom	Thaton	Kingdom	300 BC – 1085 AD	Asia: Southeast
	Khitans	Shangjing	Kingdom/Client	388 – 1211 AD	Asia: East, China
	Song dynasty	Bianjing, Lin'an	Empire	960 – 1279 AD	Asia: East, China
	Japan: Heian period	Heian-kyō	Empire	3rd century AD – present	Asia: East, Japan
	Goryeo	Kaesong	Kingdom	918 - 1392 AD	Asia: East, Korea
	Liao Dynasty	Shangjing	Empire	916-1125	Asia: East, China

== See also ==
- List of Bronze Age states
- List of Iron Age states
- List of Classical Age states
- List of states during Late Antiquity
- List of states during the Middle Ages
- List of political entities in the 10th century
