= Auqui =

Mountain in Peru

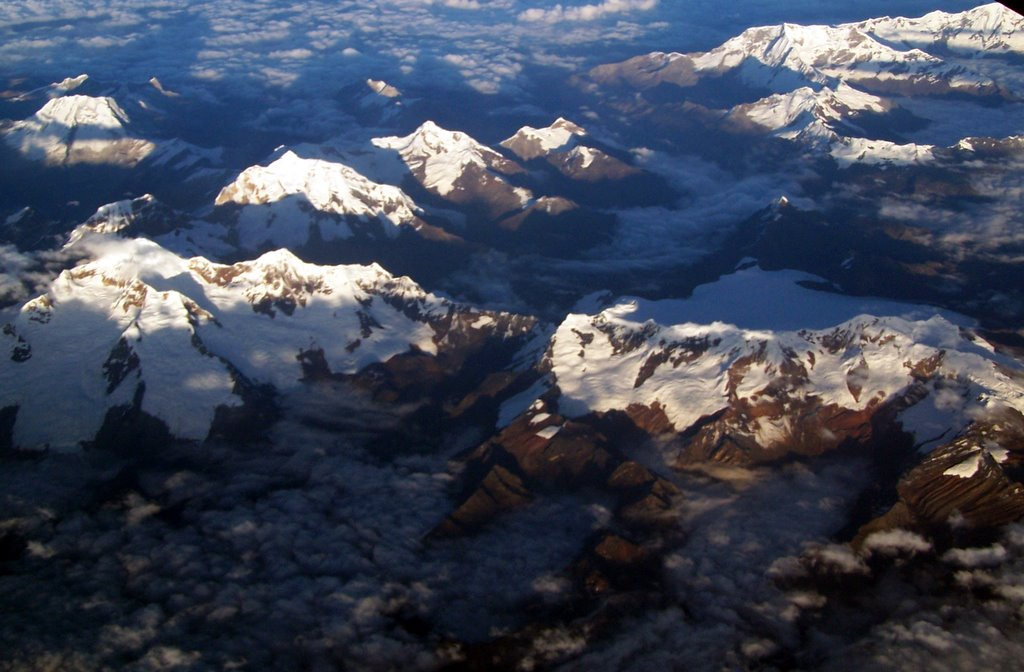
- Aerial view of the Cordillera Blanca as seen from the east with Jacabamba and Auqui in the lower center

Highest point
- Elevation: 4,800 m (15,700 ft)
- Coordinates: 9°20′16″S 77°17′29″W

Geography
- Location within Peru
- Location: Peru, Ancash Region
- Parent range: Andes, Cordillera Blanca

Auqui (possibly from Quechua for prince; a mythical figure of the Andean culture; grandfather) is a mountain in the Cordillera Blanca in the Andes of Peru, about 4,800 m (15,748 ft) high. It is situated in the Ancash Region, Huari Province, Huari District. Auqui lies southeast of Jacabamba.
