= Ututu Punta =

Mountain in Peru

- Location within Peru

Highest point
- Elevation: 4,200 m (13,800 ft)
- Coordinates: 9°10′33″S 76°52′08″W

Geography
- Location: Peru, Ancash Region
- Parent range: Andes

Ututu Punta (Quechua ututu a small viper, punta peak; ridge, 'viper peak (or ridge)", also spelled Otuto Punta) is a mountain in the Andes of Peru which reaches a height of approximately 4,200 m (13,800 ft). It is located in the Ancash Region, Huari Province, Paucas District. It lies north of Kunkush.
