= Gagamachay (Ancash-Huánuco) =

Mountain in Peru

- Location within Peru

Highest point
- Elevation: 4,400 m (14,400 ft)
- Coordinates: 9°18′19″S 76°51′58″W

Geography
- Location: Peru, Ancash Region, Huánuco Region
- Parent range: Andes

Gagamachay or Qaqa Mach'ay (Quechua qaqa rock, mach'ay cave, "rock cave", also spelled Gagamachay) is a mountain in the Andes of Peru which reaches a height of approximately 4,400 m (14,436 ft). It is located in the Ancash Region, Huari Province, on the border of the districts of Anra and Huacachi, and in the Huánuco Region, Huamalíes Province, Singa District.
