= San Marcos District =

Coordinates: 9°31′01″S 77°13′59″W

San Marcos
- District
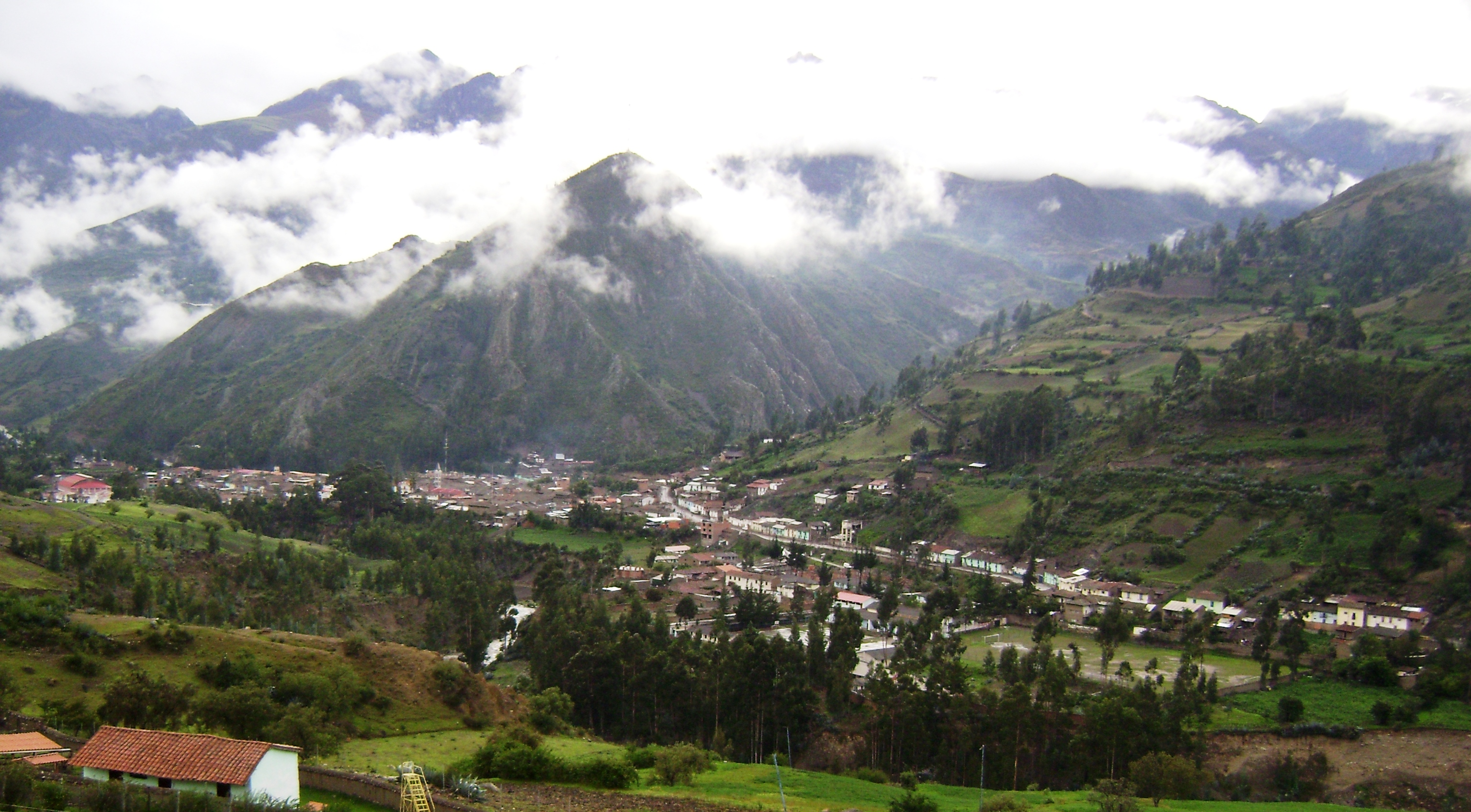
- San Marcos
- Interactive map of San Marcos
- Country: Peru
- Region: Ancash
- Province: Huari
- Capital: San Marcos

Government
  - Mayor: Christian John Palacios Laguna

Area
  - Total: 556.75 km^{2} (214.96 sq mi)
- Elevation: 2,964 m (9,724 ft)

Population (2017)
  - Total: 17,033
  - Density: 30.594/km^{2} (79.237/sq mi)
- Time zone: UTC-5 (PET)
- UBIGEO: 021014

San Marcos District is one of sixteen districts of the Huari Province in Peru.

== Geography ==
One of the highest peaks of the district is Pukarahu at approximately 5,000 m (16,000 ft). Other mountains are listed below:

- Allpa Qucha
- Anku
- Atuq
- Awaq Wank'a
- Chakaq Munti
- Hatun Chakra
- Hatun Punta
- Ichik Challwa
- Iskay Wank'a
- Isku Punta
- Kinwa Hirka
- Kunkayuq
- Kunkush
- Kuta Kancha
- K'ara K'ara
- Millwa Pillu
- Purway Kinwa
- Puywan
- Qacha Kancha
- Qucha Pata
- Rukutu
- Tampu
- Tankan
- Tullu Qallpa
- T'uqu
- Uqsha Tuna
- Urqu Pintay
- Waman Wayi
- Yanaqucha
- Yuraq Mach'ay
- Yuraq Wank'a

== Demographics and data ==
The people in the district are mainly indigenous citizens of Quechua descent. Quechua is the language which the majority of the population (72.16%) learnt to speak in childhood, 27.31% of the residents started speaking using the Spanish language (2007 Peru Census). According to the Foreign Trade Society of Peru (Comex), the district had one of the highest incomes in Peru as of 2023 due to mining and governmental contracts, though its citizens live in poor conditions due to the mismanagement of funds. The majority of citizens do not have access to sewer drainage, nearly 15% of children suffer from malnutrition and 90% of roads are unpaved.
