= Tarush Huachanan =

Mountain in Peru

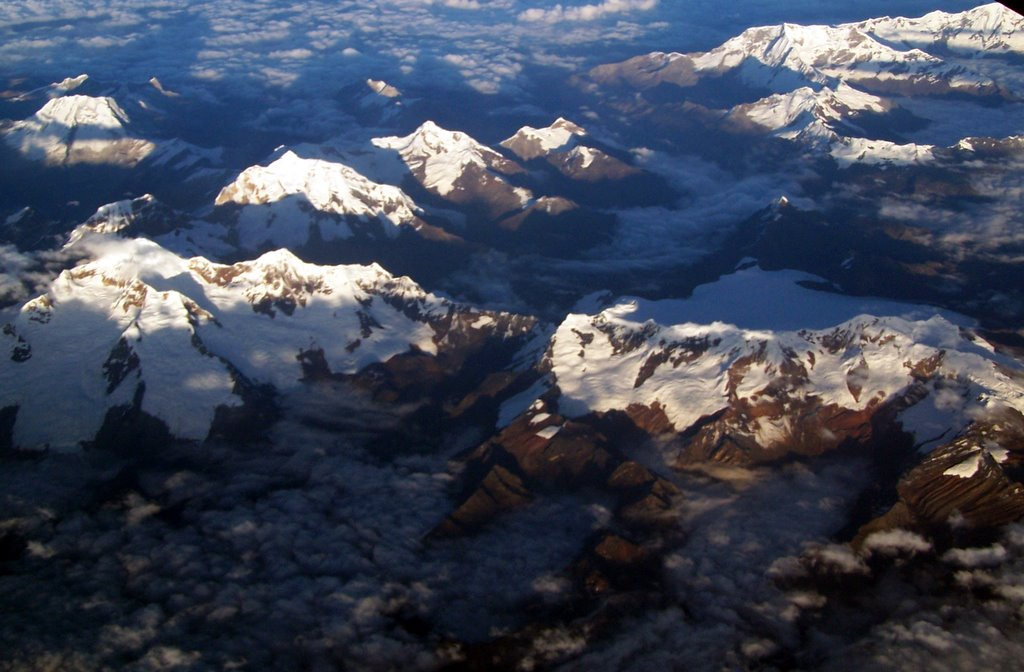
- Aerial view of the Cordillera Blanca as seen from the east with Tarush Huachanan in the lower right part of the image

Highest point
- Elevation: 5,205 m (17,077 ft)
- Coordinates: 9°17′18″S 77°17′33″W

Geography
- Location within Peru
- Location: Peru, Ancash Region
- Parent range: Andes, Cordillera Blanca

Tarush Huachanan (possibly from Ancash Quechua taruka, tarush deer, Quechua wacha birth, to give birth, -na a suffix, "where the deer is born", -n a suffix) is a mountain in the Cordillera Blanca in the Andes of Peru, 5,205 m (17,077 ft) high. It is situated in the Ancash Region, Asunción Province, Chacas District, and in the Huari Province, Huari District. Tarush Huachanan lies in the Huascarán National Park, northeast of Perlilla.
