= Ichic Challhua =

Mountain in Peru

- Location within Peru

Highest point
- Elevation: 4,600 m (15,100 ft)
- Coordinates: 9°46′00″S 77°06′38″W

Geography
- Location: Peru, Ancash Region
- Parent range: Andes

Ichic Challhua or Ichik Challwa (Ancash Quechua ichik small, Quechua challwa fish, "little fish", also spelled Ichic Challhua) is a mountain in the Andes of Peru which reaches a height of approximately 4,600 m (15,092 ft). It is located in the Ancash Region, Huari Province, San Marcos District.
