= San Pedro de Chana District =

District in Hurari Province, Peru

Coordinates: 9.39416°S 77.02964°W

San Pedro de Chana
- District
- Interactive map of San Pedro de Chana
- Country: Peru
- Region: Ancash
- Province: Huari
- Founded: June 10, 1955
- Capital: Chana

Government
  - Mayor: Juvenil Pompeyo Villajuan Collazos

Area
  - Total: 138.65 km^{2} (53.53 sq mi)
- Elevation: 3,413 m (11,198 ft)

Population (2005 census)
  - Total: 2,650
  - Density: 19.1/km^{2} (49.5/sq mi)
- Time zone: UTC-5 (PET)
- UBIGEO: 021015

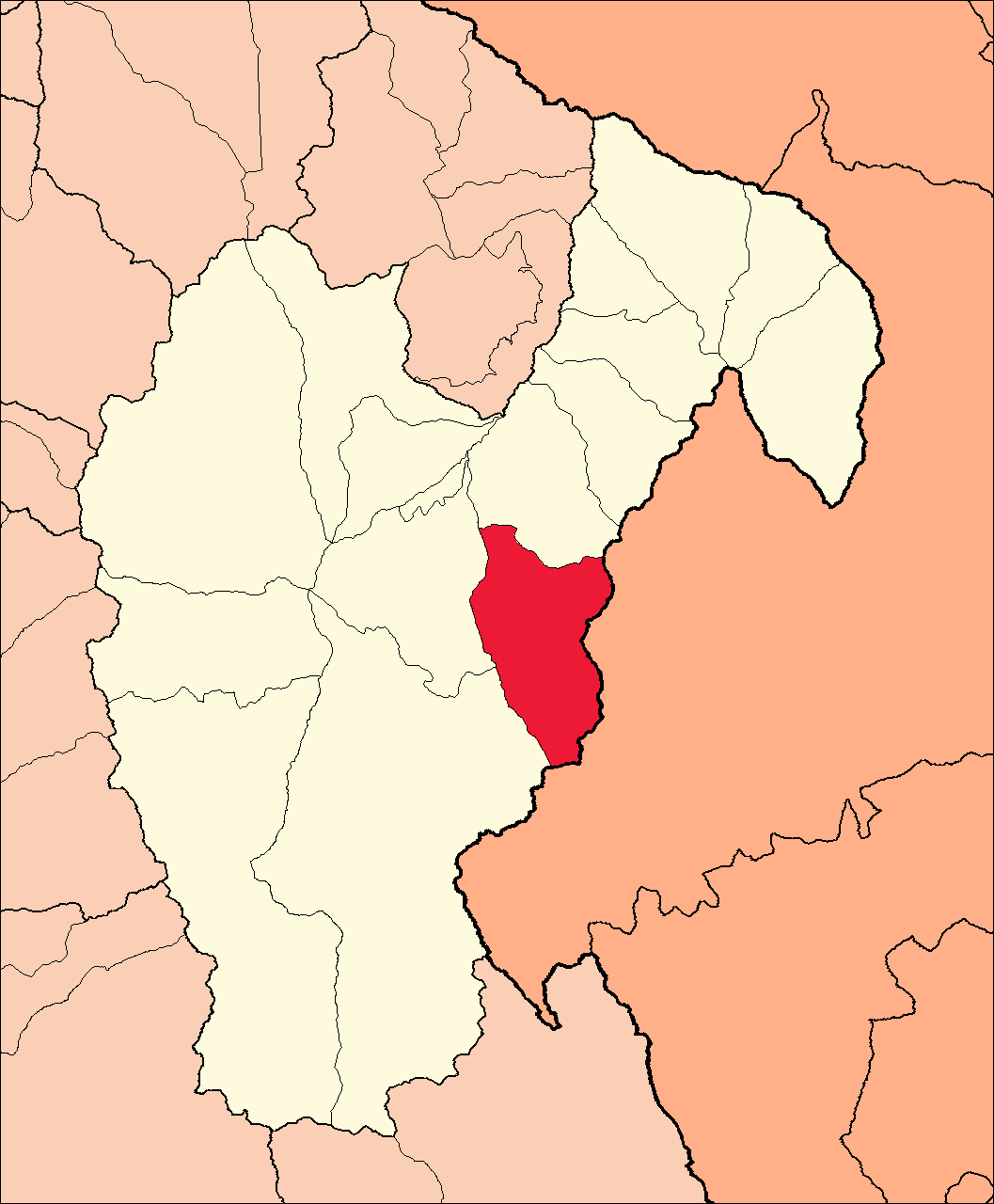

San Pedro de Chana District is one of sixteen districts of the Huari Province in Peru.

== Ethnic groups ==
The people in the district are mainly indigenous citizens of Quechua descent. Quechua is the language which the majority of the population (94.13%) learnt to speak in childhood, 5.75% of the residents started speaking using the Spanish language (2007 Peru Census).

== See also ==
- Kuntur Tuqllana
