= Quisuargaga =

Mountain in Peru

- Location within Peru

Highest point
- Elevation: 4,400 m (14,400 ft)
- Coordinates: 9°14′38″S 77°11′57″W

Geography
- Location: Peru, Ancash Region
- Parent range: Andes

Quisuargaga or Kiswar Qaqa (Quechua kiswar Buddleja incana, qaqa rock, "kiswar rock") is a mountain in the Andes of Peru, about 4,400 m (14,436 ft) high. It is situated in the Ancash Region, Huari Province, Huari District. Quisuargaga lies on the eastern border of the buffer zone of the Huascarán National Park.
