= Putaqa Hirka =

Mountain in Peru

- Location within Peru

Highest point
- Elevation: 4,200 m (13,800 ft)
- Coordinates: 9°17′30″S 77°06′00″W

Geography
- Location: Peru, Ancash Region
- Parent range: Andes, Cordillera Blanca

Putaqa Hirka (Quechua putaqa Rumex peruanus, Ancash Quechua hirka mountain, "Rumex peruanus mountain", also spelled Putacajirca) is a mountain in the eastern extensions of the Cordillera Blanca in the Andes of Peru which reaches a height of approximately 4,200 m (13,800 ft). It is located in the Ancash Region, Huari Province, on the border of the districts of Cajay and Masin.
