= Lake Allpacocha =

Lake in Peru

- Lake Japrucocha; Lake Japracocha
- Location within Peru
- Location: Peru; Ancash Region, Huari Province
- Coordinates: 9°35′58″S 77°10′39″W
- Surface elevation: 4,761 metres (15,620 ft)

Lake Allpacocha (possibly from Quechua allpa earth, qucha lake), Lake Japracocha or Lake Japrucocha is a lake in the Cordillera Blanca in the Andes of Peru. It is situated in the Ancash Region, Huari Province, in the southeast of the Chavín de Huantar District. Lake Allpacocha lies in the Huascarán National Park, near Mount Gajap. The lake is about 600 metres (1,969 ft) long and 400 metres (1,312 ft) at its widest point. It is situated at a height of 4,761 metres (15,620 ft).
