= Yanaccacca (Ancash) =

Mountain in Peru

- Location within Peru

Highest point
- Elevation: 4,200 m (13,800 ft)
- Coordinates: 9°22′34″S 77°12′29″W

Geography
- Location: Peru, Ancash
- Parent range: Andes, Cordillera Blanca

Yanaccacca (Quechua yana black, qaqa rock, "black rock") is a mountain in the Cordillera Blanca in the Andes of Peru which reaches a height of approximately 4,200 m (13,780 ft). It is located in the Ancash Region, Huari Province, Huari District, southwest of Huari. The Rurichinchay River flows along its southern slope.
