= Huachis District =

Coordinates: 9°24′10″S 77°07′36″W

Huachis
- District
- Interactive map of Huachis
- Country: Peru
- Region: Ancash
- Province: Huari
- Founded: January 2, 1857
- Capital: Huachis

Government
  - Mayor: Epifanio Rios Ocaña

Area
  - Total: 153.89 km^{2} (59.42 sq mi)
- Elevation: 3,268 m (10,722 ft)

Population (2005 census)
  - Total: 3,920
  - Density: 25.5/km^{2} (66.0/sq mi)
- Time zone: UTC-5 (PET)
- UBIGEO: 021007

Huachis District is one of sixteen districts of the Huari Province in the Ancash Region in Peru.

== Ethnic groups ==
The people in the district are mainly indigenous citizens of Quechua descent. Quechua is the language which the majority of the population (93.77%) learnt to speak in childhood, 6.06% of the residents started speaking using the Spanish language (2007 Peru Census).
