= Huacachi District =

Coordinates: 9°16′S 76°54′W

Huacachi
- District
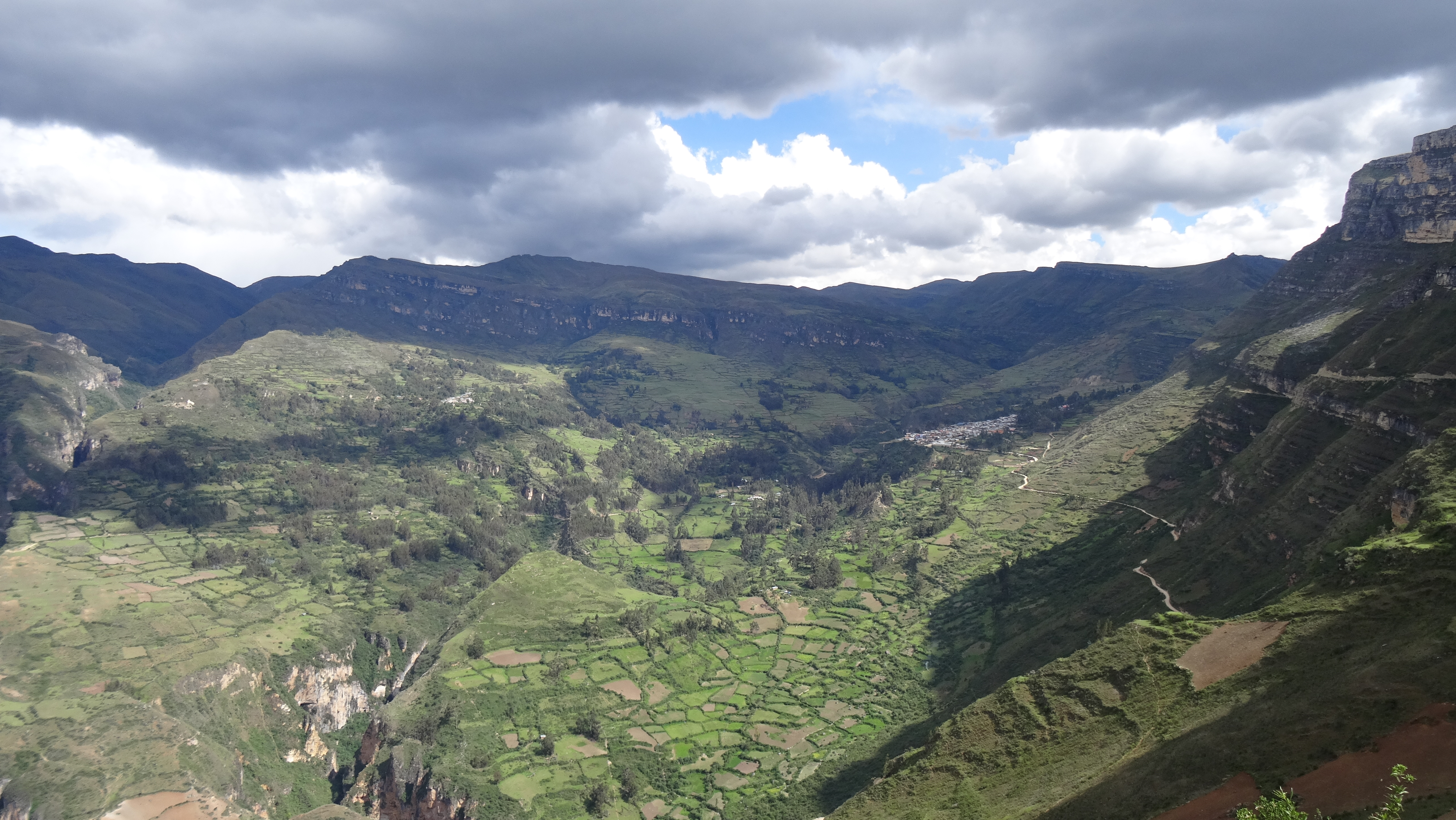
- Huacachi District
- Interactive map of Huacachi
- Country: Peru
- Region: Ancash
- Province: Huari
- Founded: October 14, 1901
- Capital: Huacachi

Government
  - Mayor: Filoter Americo Montalvo Espinoza

Area
  - Total: 86.7 km^{2} (33.5 sq mi)
- Elevation: 3,509 m (11,512 ft)

Population (2005 census)
  - Total: 2,170
  - Density: 25.0/km^{2} (64.8/sq mi)
- Time zone: UTC-5 (PET)
- UBIGEO: 021005

Huacachi District is one of sixteen districts of the Huari Province in the Ancash Region of Peru.

== Ethnic groups ==
The people in the district are mainly indigenous citizens of Quechua descent. Quechua is the language which the majority of the population (77.42%) learnt to speak in childhood, 22.12% of the residents started speaking using the Spanish language (2007 Peru Census).

== See also ==
- Qaqa Mach'ay
