= Anra District =

Coordinates: 9°13′48″S 76°55′12″W

- District
- Interactive map of Anra District
- Country: Peru
- Region: Ancash
- Province: Huari
- Founded: December 24, 1982
- Capital: Anra

Government
  - Mayor: Francisco Santiago Bazan

Area
  - Total: 80.31 km^{2} (31.01 sq mi)
- Elevation: 3,172 m (10,407 ft)

Population (2005 census)
  - Total: 1,896
  - Density: 23.61/km^{2} (61.15/sq mi)
- Time zone: UTC-5 (PET)
- UBIGEO: 021002

Anra District is one of sixteen districts of the Huari Province in Peru.

== Ethnic groups ==
The people in the district are mainly indigenous citizens of Quechua descent. Quechua is the language which the majority of the population (87.16%) learnt to speak in childhood, 12.49% of the residents started speaking using the Spanish language (2007 Peru Census).

== See also ==
- Qaqa Mach'ay
