= Yanaqucha (San Marcos) =

Mountain in Peru

- Location within Peru

Highest point
- Elevation: 4,600 m (15,100 ft)
- Coordinates: 9°41′52″S 77°05′20″W

Geography
- Location: Peru, Ancash Region
- Parent range: Andes, Cordillera Blanca

Yanaqucha (Quechua yana black, qaqa rock, "black rock", also spelled Yanaccocha) is a mountain at a small lake of that name in the eastern extensions of the Cordillera Blanca in the Andes of Peru which reaches a height of approximately 4,600 m (15,092 ft). It is located in San Marcos District, Huari Province, Ancash Region.

The lake named Yanaqucha lies west of the peak at 9°41′49″S 77°06′14″W.
