= Waman Wayi =

Mountain in Peru

- Location within Peru

Highest point
- Elevation: 4,400 m (14,400 ft)
- Coordinates: 9°35′02″S 77°07′37″W

Geography
- Location: Peru, Ancash Region
- Parent range: Andes

Waman Wayi (Quechua waman falcon, Ancash Quechua wayi house, "falcon house", also spelled Huamanhuay) is a mountain in the Andes of Peru which reaches a height of approximately 4,400 m (14,436 ft). It is located in the Ancash Region, Huari Province, San Marcos District.
