= Matagaga =

Mountain in Peru

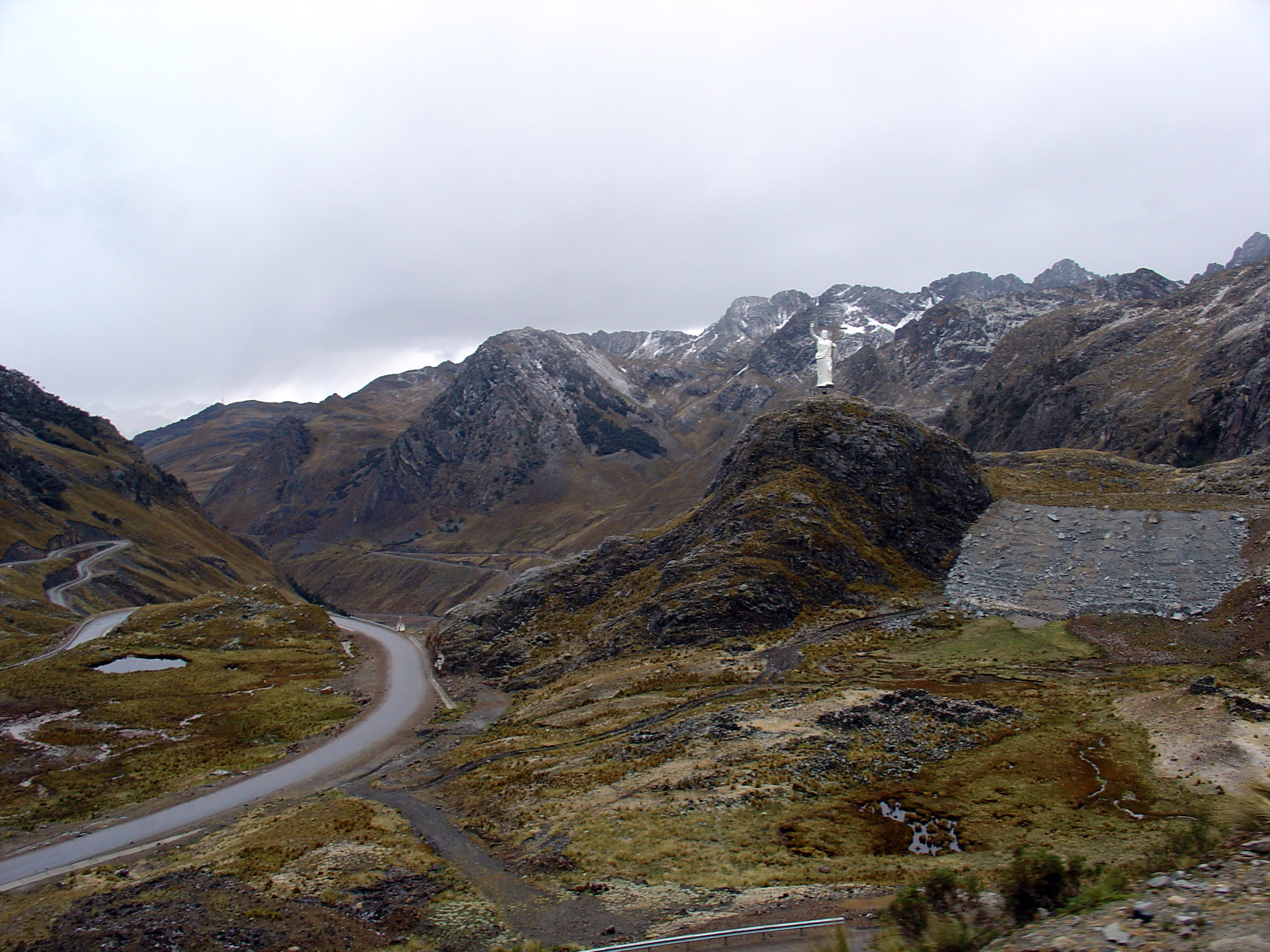
- Matagaga in the background (center-right) as seen from the road above Querococha

Highest point
- Elevation: 4,400 m (14,400 ft)
- Coordinates: 9°41′20″S 77°09′55″W

Geography
- Location within Peru
- Location: Peru, Ancash Region
- Parent range: Andes

Matagaga (possibly from Quechua mata united, qaqa rock, "united rock") is a mountain on the eastern extensions of the Cordillera Blanca in the Andes of Peru, about 4,400 metres (14,436 ft) high. It is situated in the Ancash Region, Huari Province, Chavin de Huantar District. Mata Qaqa lies east of the Rangracancha valley (possibly from Quechua for "stoney corral") and northeast of the Challhua valley (possibly from Quechua challwa fish). The Mosna River flows along its northern slopes.
