= Quinuajirca =

Mountain in Peru

- Location within Peru

Highest point
- Elevation: 4,400 m (14,400 ft)
- Coordinates: 9°22′01″S 77°14′37″W

Geography
- Location: Peru, Ancash Region
- Parent range: Andes, Cordillera Blanca

Quinuajirca or Kinwa Hirka (Quechua kinwa Chenopodium quinoa, Ancash Quechua hirka mountain, "quinoa mountain", also spelled Quinuajirca) is a mountain in the eastern extensions of the Cordillera Blanca in the Andes of Peru which reaches a height of approximately 4,400 m (14,400 ft). It is located in the Ancash Region, Huari Province, Huari District. Quinuajirca lies at the Rurichinchay valley, northeast of the peak of Chinchey.
