= Puyhuan (Ancash) =

Mountain in Peru

- Location within Peru

Highest point
- Elevation: 4,980 m (16,340 ft)
- Coordinates: 9°37′59″S 77°14′45″W

Geography
- Location: Peru, Ancash Region
- Parent range: Cordillera Blanca

Puyhuan (possibly from Quechua for heart of an animal) is a 4,980-metre-high (16,339 ft) mountain in the Cordillera Blanca in the Andes of Peru. It is situated in the Ancash Region, Huari Province, Chavín de Huantar District. Puyhuan lies northwest of Huaracayoc, northeast of Yanarahu and southeast of Tuctu.
