= Yuracyacu (Huari) =

Mountain in Peru

- Location within Peru

Highest point
- Elevation: 4,800 m (15,700 ft)
- Coordinates: 9°44′26″S 77°12′54″W

Geography
- Location: Peru, Ancash Region
- Parent range: Andes, Cordillera Blanca

Yuracyacu (possibly from Quechua Yuraq Yaku, yuraq white, yaku water, "white water") is a mountain in the Cordillera Blanca in the Andes of Peru, about 4,800 m (15,700 ft) high. It is located in the Ancash Region, Huari Province, Chavín de Huantar District. It lies northeast of Queshque.
