= Chavín de Huantar District =

Coordinates: 9°34′59″S 77°15′00″W

Chavín de Huántar
- District
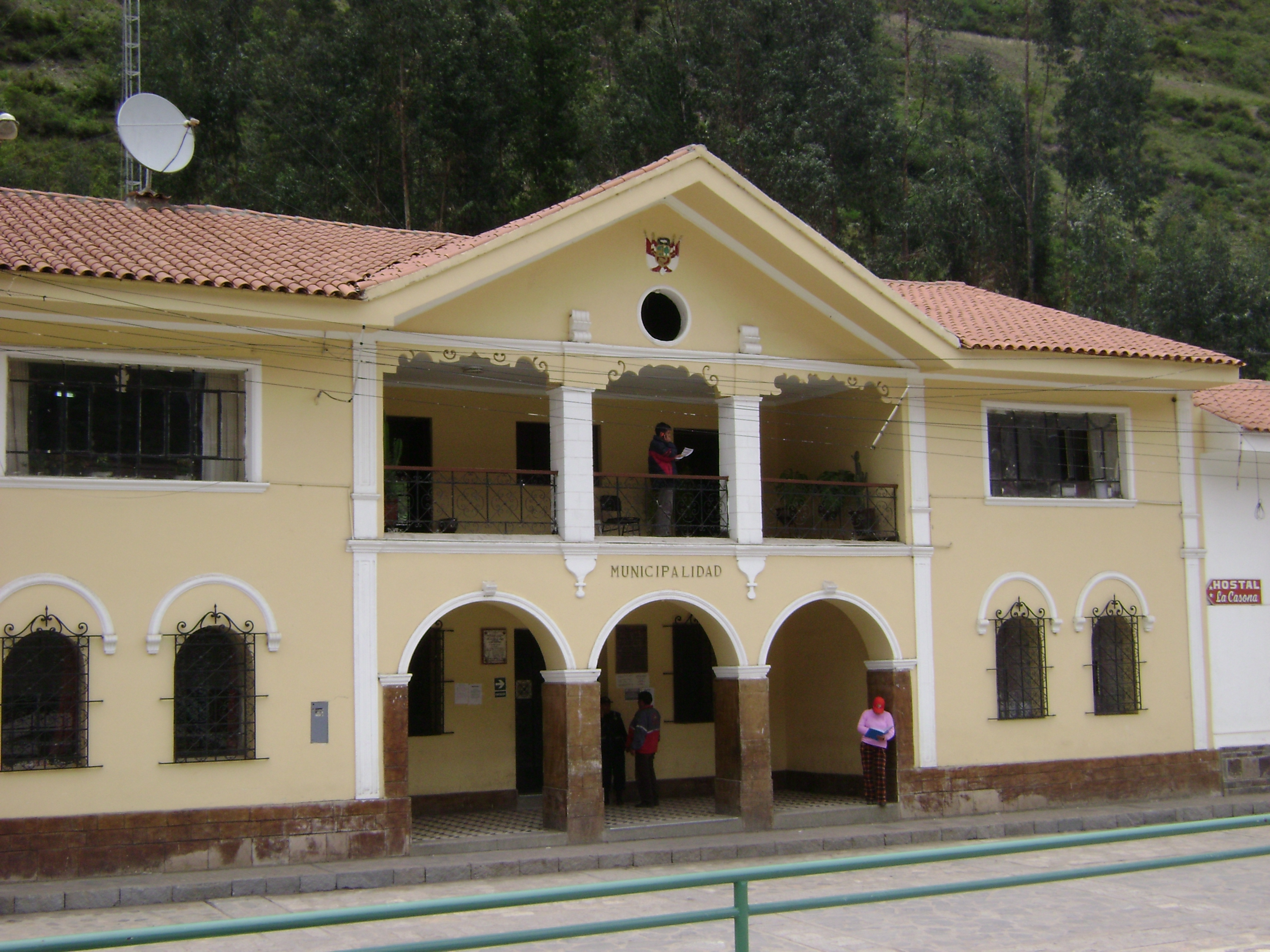
- Interactive map of Chavín de Huántar
- Country: Peru
- Region: Ancash
- Province: Huari
- Capital: Chavín de Huántar

Government
  - Mayor: Justino Zenon Montes Colcas

Area
  - Total: 434.13 km^{2} (167.62 sq mi)
- Elevation: 3,137 m (10,292 ft)

Population (2005 census)
  - Total: 8,694
  - Density: 20.03/km^{2} (51.87/sq mi)
- Time zone: UTC-5 (PET)
- UBIGEO: 021004

Chavín de Huántar District is one of sixteen districts of the Huari Province in Peru.

== Geography ==
The Cordillera Blanca traverses the western part of the district. Some of the highest peaks of the district are listed below:

- Khuchi Mach'ay
- Mata Qaqa
- Mururahu
- Puka Mach'ay
- Puywan
- Qawish
- Qishqi
- Ruriq
- Shawanka Punta
- Tuqtu
- Urwashrahu
- Waraqayuq
- Yanamaray
- Yanarahu
- Yuraq Yaku

== Ethnic groups ==
The people in the district are mainly indigenous citizens of Quechua descent. Quechua is the language which the majority of the population (82.85%) learnt to speak in childhood, 16.71% of the residents started speaking using the Spanish language (2007 Peru Census).

== Climate ==
Climate data for Chavín, elevation 2,985 m (9,793 ft), (1991–2020)
Month	Jan	Feb	Mar	Apr	May	Jun	Jul	Aug	Sep	Oct	Nov	Dec	Year
Mean daily maximum °C (°F)	20.6 (69.1)	20.0 (68.0)	19.3 (66.7)	20.1 (68.2)	21.4 (70.5)	21.5 (70.7)	21.7 (71.1)	22.1 (71.8)	21.9 (71.4)	21.3 (70.3)	21.6 (70.9)	20.9 (69.6)	21.0 (69.9)
Mean daily minimum °C (°F)	8.8 (47.8)	9.1 (48.4)	8.9 (48.0)	8.2 (46.8)	7.6 (45.7)	6.5 (43.7)	6.1 (43.0)	7.1 (44.8)	8.2 (46.8)	8.5 (47.3)	8.4 (47.1)	8.7 (47.7)	8.0 (46.4)
Average precipitation mm (inches)	97.6 (3.84)	103.7 (4.08)	120.6 (4.75)	70.9 (2.79)	26.2 (1.03)	9.0 (0.35)	5.4 (0.21)	8.8 (0.35)	29.3 (1.15)	66.8 (2.63)	70.8 (2.79)	91.1 (3.59)	700.2 (27.56)
Source: National Meteorology and Hydrology Service of Peru

== See also ==
- Allpaqucha
- Yanaqucha
