= Masin District =

Coordinates: 9.33600°S 77.18049°W

Masin
- District
- Interactive map of Masin
- Country: Peru
- Region: Ancash
- Province: Huari
- Founded: February 2, 1956
- Capital: Masin

Government
  - Mayor: Pablo Malvaceda Ortega

Area
  - Total: 75.33 km^{2} (29.09 sq mi)
- Elevation: 2,550 m (8,370 ft)

Population (2005 census)
  - Total: 2,024
  - Density: 26.87/km^{2} (69.59/sq mi)
- Time zone: UTC-5 (PET)
- UBIGEO: 021009

Masin District is one of sixteen districts of the Huari Province in Peru.

== Ethnic groups ==
The people in the district are mainly indigenous citizens of Quechua descent. Quechua is the language which the majority of the population (71.36%) learnt to speak in childhood, 28.21% of the residents started speaking using the Spanish language (2007 Peru Census).

== See also ==
- Markahirka
- Putaqa Hirka
