= Rahuapampa District =

Coordinates: 9°22′59″S 77°09′00″W

Rahuapampa
- District
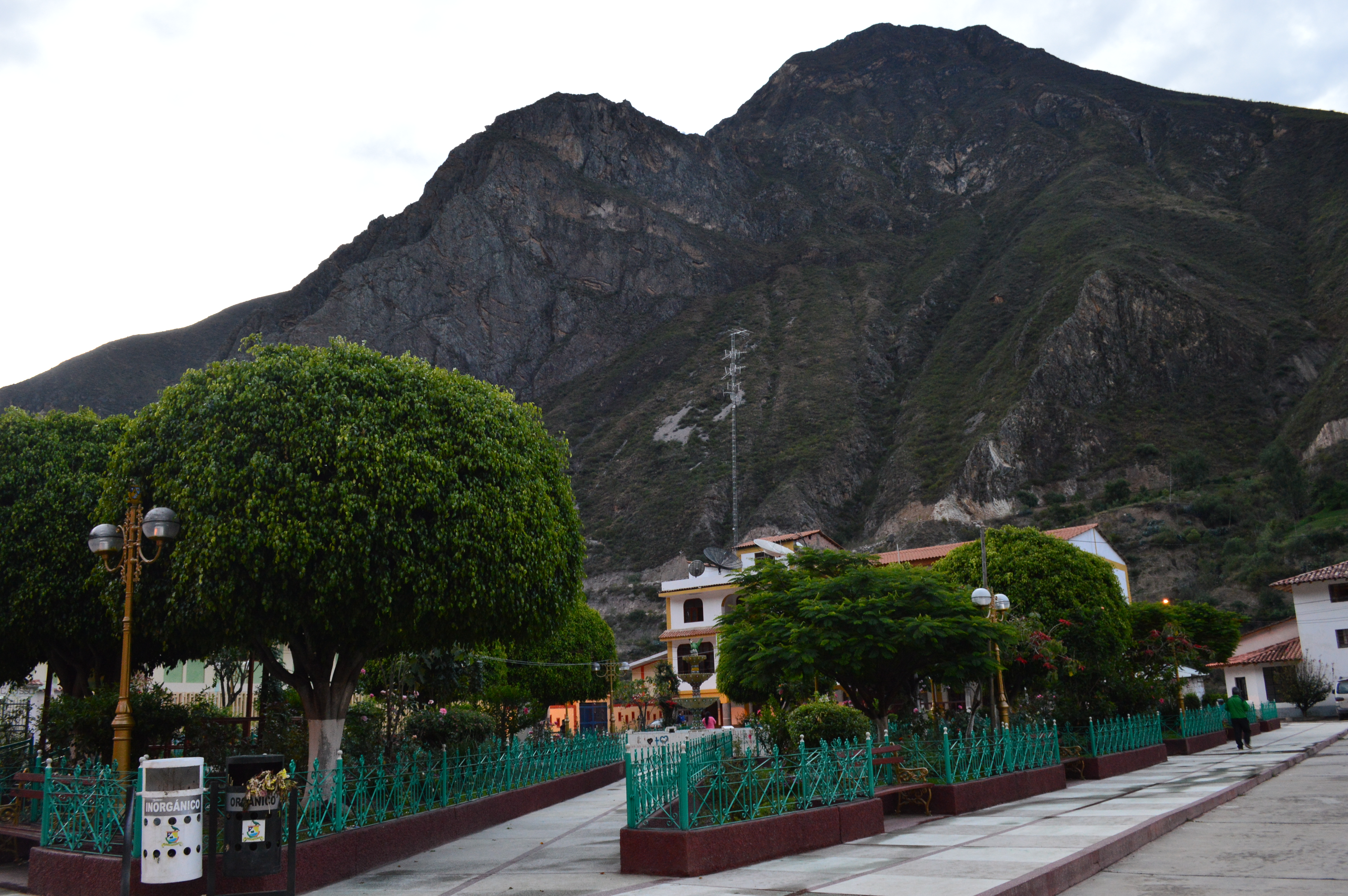
- Rahuapampa District
- Interactive map of Rahuapampa
- Country: Peru
- Region: Ancash
- Province: Huari
- Founded: October 11, 1957
- Capital: Rahuapampa

Government
  - Mayor: Pedro Quispe Huallpa

Area
  - Total: 9.02 km^{2} (3.48 sq mi)
- Elevation: 2,550 m (8,370 ft)

Population (2005 census)
  - Total: 807
  - Density: 89.5/km^{2} (232/sq mi)
- Time zone: UTC-5 (PET)
- UBIGEO: 021012

Rahuapampa District is one of sixteen districts of the Huari Province in Peru.
