= Ponto District =

Coordinates: 9°16′01″S 76°58′01″W

Ponto
- District
- Interactive map of Ponto
- Country: Peru
- Region: Ancash
- Province: Huari
- Founded: September 30, 1943
- Capital: Ponto

Government
  - Mayor: Hector Anibal Quiñones Ortega

Area
  - Total: 118.29 km^{2} (45.67 sq mi)
- Elevation: 3,140 m (10,300 ft)

Population (2005 census)
  - Total: 3,175
  - Density: 26.84/km^{2} (69.52/sq mi)
- Time zone: UTC-5 (PET)
- UBIGEO: 021011

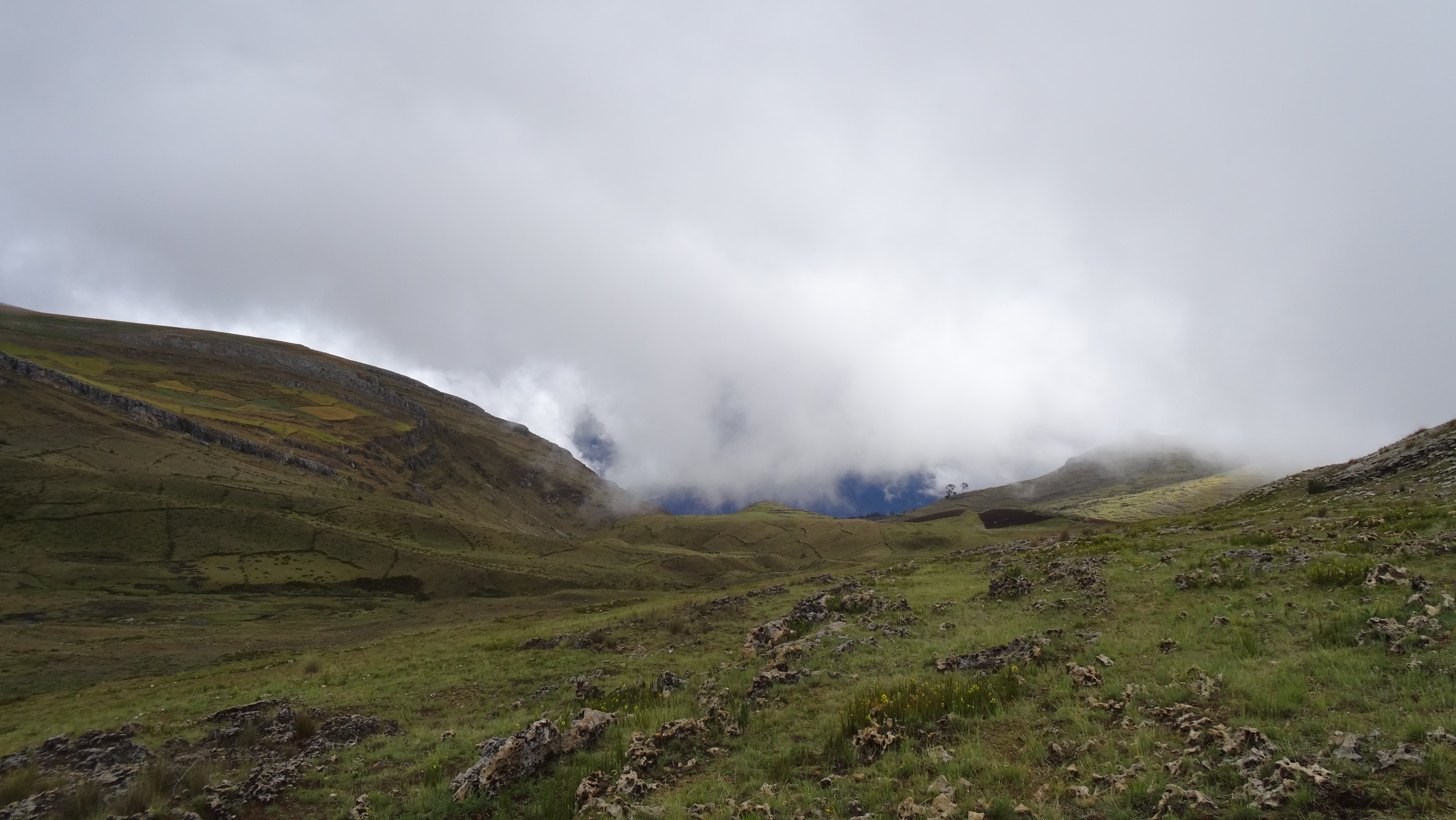
Distrito de Pontó

Ponto District is one of sixteen districts of the Huari Province in Peru.

== Ethnic groups ==
The people in the district are mainly indigenous citizens of Quechua descent. Quechua is the language which the majority of the population (93.71%) learnt to speak in childhood, 6.11% of the residents started speaking using the Spanish language (2007 Peru Census).
