= List of political entities in the 10th century =

Political entities in the 9th century – Political entities in the 11th century – Political entities by year

This is a list of political entities in the 10th century (901–1000) AD.

== Political entities ==
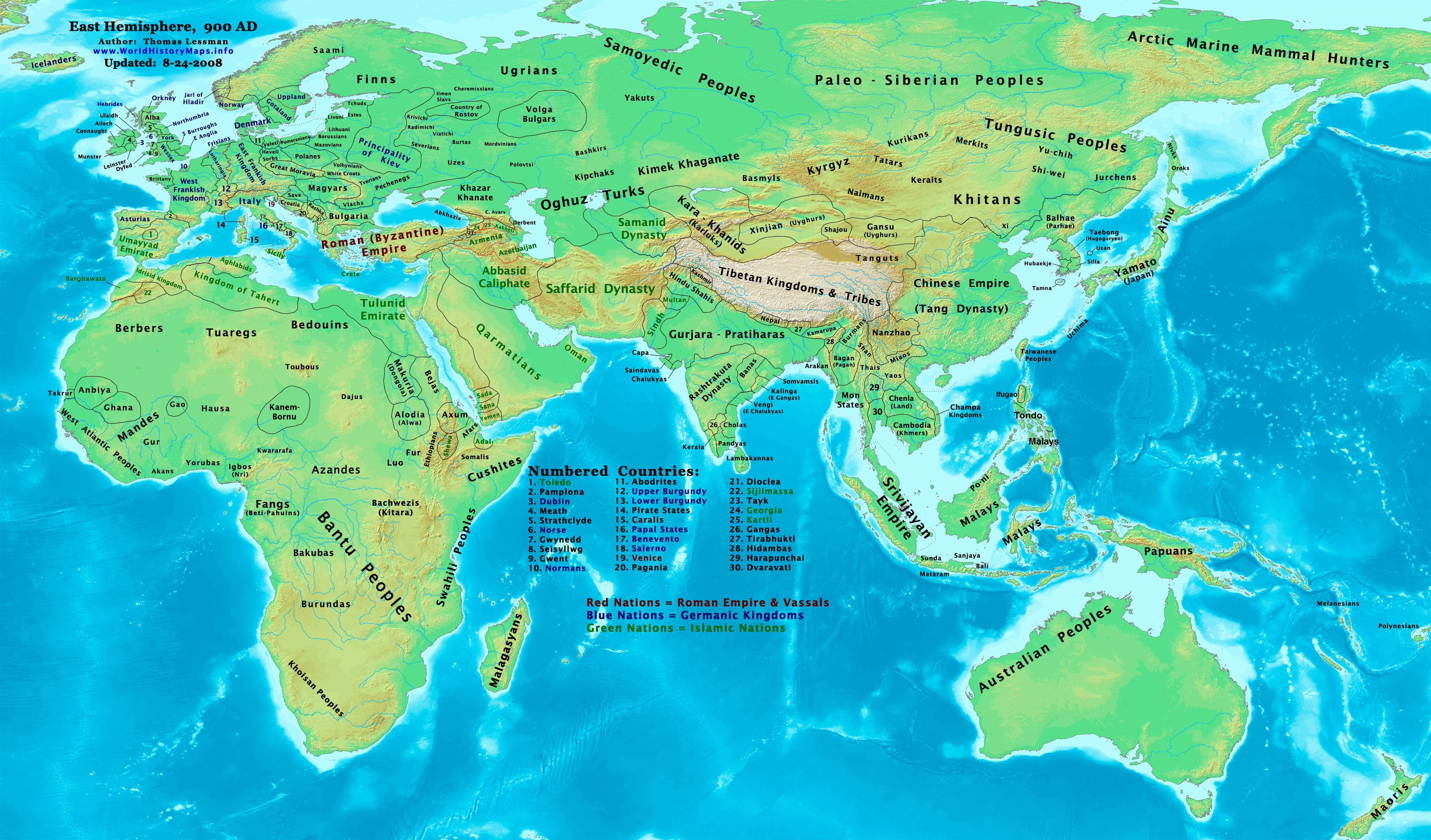
Map of the Old World in 900 AD

Name	Capital(s)	State type	Existed	Location
Abbasid Caliphate	Baghdad	Empire	750 – 1256 AD	Africa: North; Asia: West
Ikhshidid Emirate	Fustat	Kingdom	935 – 969 AD	Africa: North; Asia: West
Fatimid Caliphate	Mahdia, Al-Mansuriya, Cairo	Empire	909 – 1171 AD	Africa: North; Asia: West
Aghlabids	Kairouan	Emirate	800 – 909 AD	Africa: North-central
Kanem Empire	Njimi	Empire	c. 700 – 1387 AD	Africa: North-central
Kingdom of Aksum	Aksum	Kingdom	c.100 – c.940 AD	Africa: Northeast
Alodia	Soba	Empire	680 – 1504 AD	Africa: Northeast
Makuria	Dongola	Kingdom	340 – 1312 AD	Africa: Northeast
Idrisid dynasty	Fez	Empire	788 – 985 AD	Africa: Northwest
Ghana Empire	Koumbi Saleh	Empire	c. 400 – 1235 AD	Africa: West
Kingdom of Nri	Igbo-Ukwu	Kingdom	948 – 1911 AD	Africa: West
Zapotec	Various	Kingdom City States	700 BC – 1521 AD	Americas: Central
Pueblo	Various	Tribal chiefdom's	12th century BC – 14th century AD	Americas: North
Cañari	Tumebamba	Tribal Confederacy	500 – 1533 AD	Americas: South
Tiwanaku empire	Tiwanaku	Empire	300 – 1000 AD	Americas: South
Wari Empire	Huari	Empire	500 – 1100 AD	Americas: South
Byzantine Empire	Constantinople	Empire	395 – 1453 AD	Europe: Balkans, Asia: West; Africa: Northeast
Emirate of Crete	Chandax	Principality	824 – 961 AD	Europe: Balkans
First Bulgarian Empire	Various	Empire	681 – 1018 AD	Europe: Balkans
Principality of Hungary	Esztergom, Székesfehérvár	Principality	895 – 1000 AD	Europe: Balkans
Narentines		Tribal chiefdom/countship/dukedom	6th – 10th centuries AD	Europe: Balkans
Principality of Serbia	Various	Principality	7th – 10th centuries	Europe: Balkans
Kingdom of Croatia (medieval)	Various	Kingdom	925 – 1102 AD	Europe: Balkans
Travunija	Trebinje	Principality/client	850 – 1482 AD	Europe: Balkans
Ailech	Grianán Ailigh	Kingdom	450 – 1283 AD	Europe: British Isles
Airgíalla	Clogher	Tribal Federation/Kingdom	331 – 1590 AD	Europe: British Isles
Kingdom of Alba	Clogher	Kingdom	900 – 1286 AD	Europe: British Isles
Kingdom of Breifne	Croghan	Kingdom	700 – 1256 AD	Europe: British Isles
Brycheiniog	Talgarth	Kingdom	450 – 1045 AD	Europe: British Isles
Connacht		Tribal chiefdom/kingdom	c. 10th century BC – 1474 AD	Europe: British Isles
Dyfed		Kingdom	410 – 910 AD	Europe: British Isles
Kingdom of East Anglia	Rendlesham, Dommoc	Kingdom	6th C – 918 AD	Europe: British Isles
Kingdom of England	Winchester, London	Kingdom	927 – 1707 AD	Europe: British Isles
Glywysing	Cardiff	Kingdom	490 – 1063 AD	Europe: British Isles
Gwent	Caerwent, Porth-is-Coed	Kingdom	420 – 1081 AD	Europe: British Isles
Gwynedd	Various	Kingdom	420 – 1261 AD	Europe: British Isles
Leinster		Kingdom	436 – 1632 AD	Europe: British Isles
Kingdom of the Isles		Kingdom	848 – 1266 AD	Europe: British Isles
Meath	Dublin	Kingdom	1st century – 1173 AD	Europe: British Isles
Mercia	Tamworth	Kingdom	527 – 918 AD	Europe: British Isles
Mormaer of Moray		Kingdom	c. 970 – 1130 AD	Europe: British Isles
Kingdom of Northumbria	Bamburgh	Kingdom	653 – 954 AD	Europe: British Isles
Osraige	Kilkenny	Kingdom	150 – 1185 AD	Europe: British Isles
Powys	Various	Kingdom	488 – 1160 AD	Europe: British Isles
Kingdom of Scotland	Stirling, Edinburgh	Kingdom	843 – 1707 AD	Europe: British Isles
Strathclyde	Dumbarton, Govan	Kingdom	450 – 1093 AD	Europe: British Isles
Tyrconnell	Dun na nGall	Kingdom	464 – 1607 AD	Europe: British Isles
Uí Failghe	Rathangan, Daingean	Kingdom	507 – 1550 AD	Europe: British Isles
Ulster		Kingdom	465 – 1177 AD	Europe: British Isles
Wessex	Winchester	Kingdom	519 – 1018 AD	Europe: British Isles
Cumania	Not specified	Nomadic confederation	900 – 1220 AD	Europe: East; Asia: Central
Khazar Khaganate	Various	Nomadic Kingdom	618 – 1048 AD	Europe: East; Asia, Central; Eurasian: Caucasus
Kievan Rus'	Kiev	Federated principalities	882 – 1283 AD	Europe: East
Volga Bulgaria	Bolghar, Bilär	Kingdom	660 – 1236 AD	Europe: East
Denmark	Various	Kingdom	c. 900 – present	Europe: Nordic
Icelandic Commonwealth	Þingvellir	Commonwealth (federation)	930 – 1262 AD	Europe: Nordic
Norway	Various	Kingdom	872 AD – present	Europe: Nordic
Sweden	Various	Kingdom	c. 970 – present	Europe: Nordic
Duchy of Benevento after 774, Principality of Benevento	Benevento	Dukedom/Principality/Client	571 – 1074 AD	Europe: South
Papal States	Rome	Pontifical states	754 – 1870 AD	Europe: South
San Marino	San Marino	Republic	301 AD – present	Europe: South
Duchy of Tridentum	Benevento	Dukedom/Principality	574 – 1802 AD	Europe: South
Republic of Venice	Venice	Republic	697 – 1797 AD	Europe: South
Armorica		Kingdom/dukedom	343 – 1532 AD	Europe: West
Kingdom of Asturias	Various	Kingdom	718 – 924 AD	Europe: West
Viscounty of Béarn	Various	Viscounty	9th century – 1620 AD	Europe: West
Duchy of Brittany	Various	Dukedom	939 – 1547 AD	Europe: West
Emirate of Córdoba	Córdoba	Principality	756 – 929 AD	Europe: West
Caliphate of Córdoba	Córdoba	Kingdom	929 – 1031 AD	Europe: West
Cornouaille		Principality	430 – 1084 AD	Europe: West
County of Flanders	Various	Countship	862 – 1795 AD	Europe: West
Kingdom of France	Paris, Versailles	Kingdom	843 – 1792 AD	Europe: West
Kingdom of Galicia	Santiago de Compostela	Kingdom	409 – 1833 AD	Europe: West
Holy Roman Empire	No official	Empire	962 – 1806 AD	Europe: West, South
Kingdom of León	Leon	Kingdom	910 – 1230 AD	Europe: West
Lorraine (duchy)	Nancy	Dukedom	959 – 1766 AD	Europe: West
Lotharingia		Kingdom	855 – 959 AD	Europe: West
Kingdom of Navarre	Pamplona	Kingdom	824 – 1620 AD	Europe: West
Duchy of Normandy	Rouen	Duchy	911 – 1259 AD	Europe: West
Poher	Vorgium	Principality	520 – 936 AD	Europe: West
Raetia Curiensis	Chur	Bishopric (religious state)	452 – 1160 AD	Europe: West
Duchy of Thuringia		Duchy	631 – 1440 AD	Europe: West
Sarir	Humraj	Kingdom/Client	453 – 12th century AD	Eurasian: Caucasus
Afrighids	Kath	Kingdom/Client	305 – 995 AD	Asia: Central
Kara-Khanid Khanate	Balasagun, Kashgar, Samarkand	Nomadic confederation	840 – 1212 AD	Asia: Central
Khotan	Khotan	Kingdom	56 – 1006 AD	Asia: Central
Tatar confederation	Not specified	Confederation	8th century – 1202 AD	Asia: Central
Anuradhapura	Anuradhapura	Kingdom	377 BC – 1017 AD	Asia: South
Ay	Aykudi	Kingdom	4th century BC – 12th century AD	Asia: South
Kingdom of Bumthang	Chakhar Gutho	Kingdom	7th – 17th centuries AD	Asia: South
Chera Kingdom		Kingdom	5th century BC – 1102 AD	Asia: South
Eastern Chalukyas	Vengi, Rajamundry	Kingdom	624 – 1129 AD	Asia: South
Garhwal Kingdom	Various	Kingdom	888 – 1949 AD	Asia: South
Ghurid dynasty	Various	Sultanate	879 – 1215 AD	Asia: South, West, Central
Gurjara-Pratihara	Kannauj	Empire	650 – 1036 AD	Asia: South
Kabul Shahi	Kabul, Waihind	Kingdom/Empire	6th century – 1026 AD	Asia: South
Kamarupa	Various	Kingdom	350 – 1140 AD	Asia: South
Rajarata	Various	Kingdom	377 BC – 1310 AD	Asia: South
Western Ganga dynasty	Kolar, Talakad	Kingdom	350 – 1000 AD	Asia: South
Annam / Đại Cồ Việt	Daluocheng, Hoa Lư	Kingdom	938 – 1804 AD	Asia: Southeast, Vietnam
Bruneian Empire	Various	Empire	7th century – 1888 AD	Asia: Southeast
Champa	Various	Kingdom	192 – 1832 AD	Asia: Southeast
Gangga Negara	Gangga Negara	Kingdom	2nd – 11th centuries AD	Asia: Southeast
Khmer Empire	Yaśodharapura (Angkor)	Empire	802 – 1431 AD	Asia: Southeast
Langkasuka	Kedah, Pattani	Kingdom	100 – 1516 AD	Asia: Southeast
Lavo Kingdom	Lavo, Ayodhaya	Kingdom	450 – 1388 AD	Asia: Southeast
Melayu Kingdom	Jambi	Kingdom	4th – 13th centuries AD	Asia: Southeast
Pyu city-states	Sri Ksetra	Federated City States	250 BC – 1085 AD	Asia: Southeast
Sunda Kingdom	Various	Kingdom	669 – 1579 AD	Asia: Southeast
Thaton Kingdom	Thaton	Kingdom	300 BC – 1085 AD	Asia: Southeast
Tang dynasty	Chang'an, Luoyang	Empire	618 – 907 AD	Asia: East, Central
Khitans	Shangjing	Kingdom/Client	388 – 1211 AD	Asia: East, China
Song dynasty	Bianjing, Lin'an	Empire	960 – 1279 AD	Asia: East, China
Japan	Heian-kyō	Empire	3rd century AD – present	Asia: East, Japan
Balhae	Dongmo	Empire	698 – 926 AD	Asia: East, Korean Peninsula
Silla	Gyeongju	Kingdom	55 BC – 935 AD	Asia: East, Korean Peninsula
Usan		Kingdom	512 – 930 AD	Asia: East, Korean Peninsula

== See also ==
- List of Bronze Age states
- List of Iron Age states
- List of Classical Age states
- List of states during Late Antiquity
- List of states during the Middle Ages

List of political entities in the 10th century
Preceded by 9th century	Political entities of the 10th century	Succeeded by 11th century
