= Huacchis District =

Coordinates: 9.20033°S 76.78780°W

Huacchis
- District
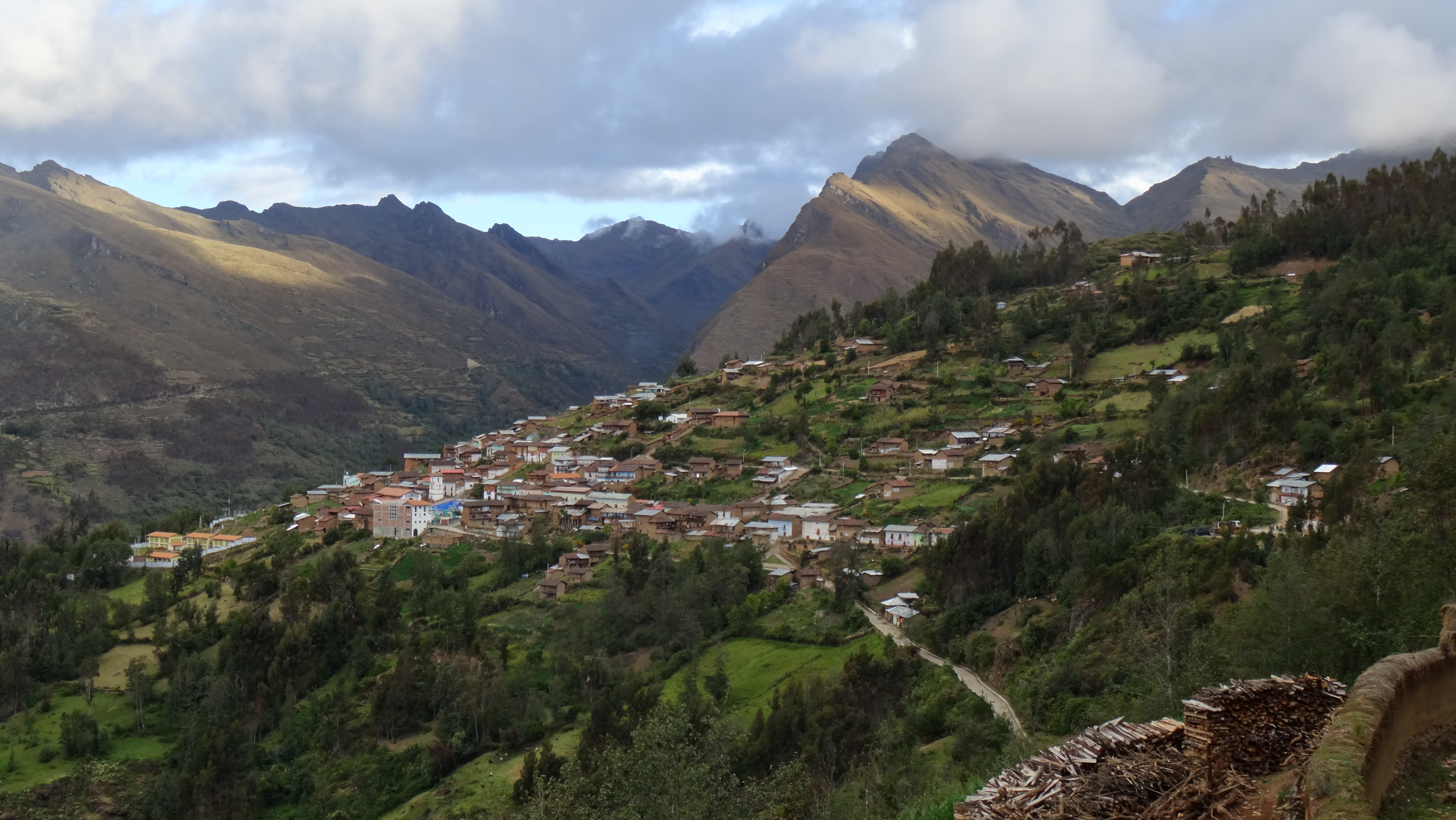
- Huacchis District
- Interactive map of Huacchis
- Country: Peru
- Region: Ancash
- Province: Huari
- Founded: December 14, 1954
- Capital: Huacchis

Government
  - Mayor: Serafin Perez Remigio

Area
  - Total: 72.16 km^{2} (27.86 sq mi)
- Elevation: 3,491 m (11,453 ft)

Population (2005 census)
  - Total: 2,151
  - Density: 29.81/km^{2} (77.20/sq mi)
- Time zone: UTC-5 (PET)
- UBIGEO: 021006

Huacchis District is one of sixteen districts of the Huari Province in Peru.

== Ethnic groups ==
The people in the district are mainly indigenous citizens of Quechua descent. Quechua is the language which the majority of the population (76.82%) learnt to speak in childhood, 22.76 % of the residents started speaking using the Spanish language (2007 Peru Census).
