= Paucas District =

Coordinates: 9°07′59″S 76°54′00″W

Paucas
- District
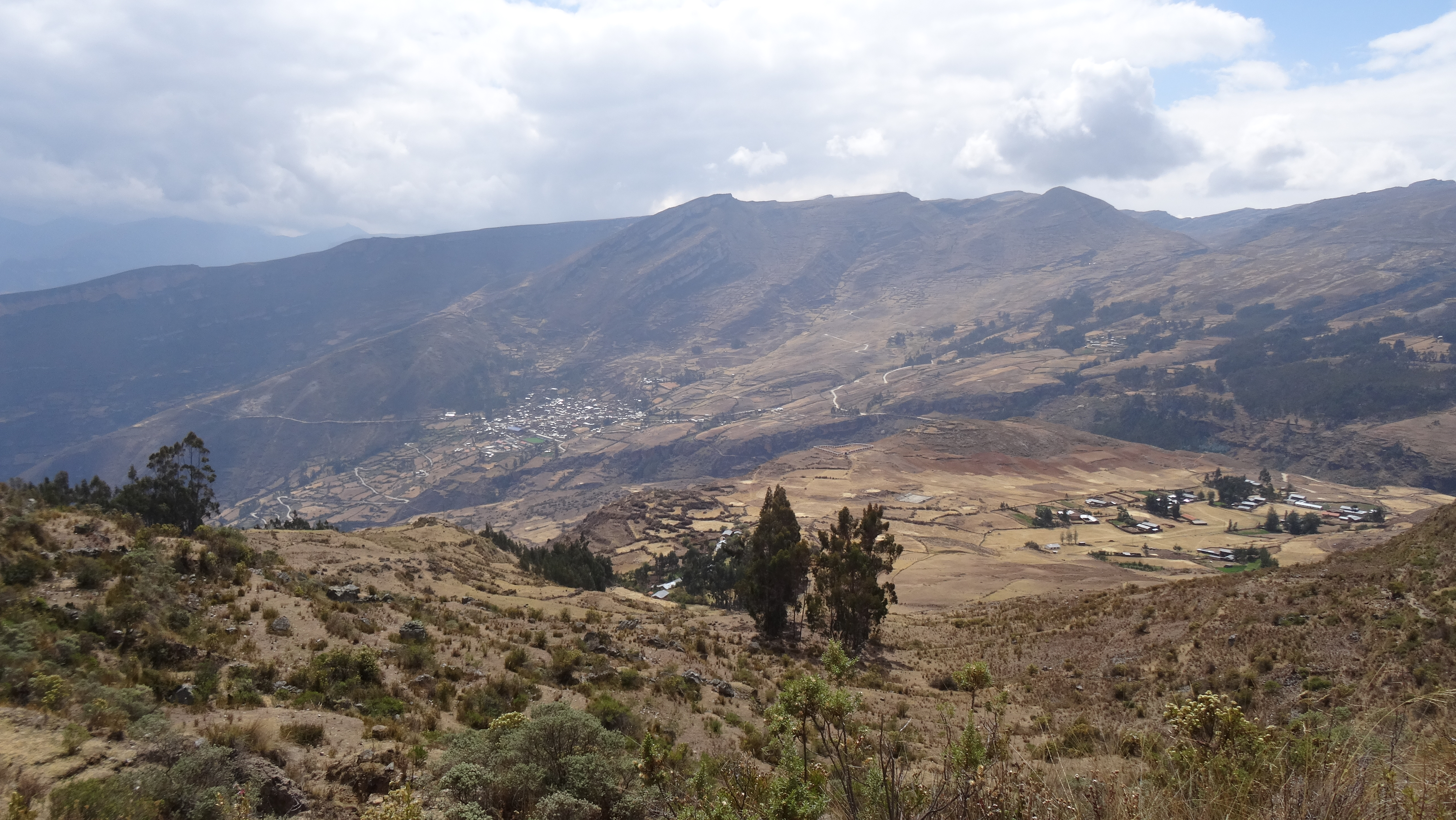
- A view of the district from the point of Cerro San Cristóbal
- Interactive map of Paucas
- Country: Peru
- Region: Ancash
- Province: Huari
- Founded: May 10, 1955
- Capital: Paucas

Government
  - Mayor: Robert Pompeo Benites Meza

Area
  - Total: 135.31 km^{2} (52.24 sq mi)
- Elevation: 3,421 m (11,224 ft)

Population (2005 census)
  - Total: 2,214
  - Density: 16.36/km^{2} (42.38/sq mi)
- Time zone: UTC-5 (PET)
- UBIGEO: 021010

Paucas District is one of sixteen districts of the Huari Province in Peru.

== Ethnic groups ==
The people in the district are mainly indigenous citizens of Quechua descent. Quechua is the language which the majority of the population (80.66%) learnt to speak in childhood, 19.19% of the residents started speaking using the Spanish language (2007 Peru Census).

== See also ==
- Kunkush
- Ututu Punta
