= Yanaqucha (Huari) =

Lake in Chavín de Huantar District, Peru

- Location within Peru
- Location: Peru; Ancash Region, Huari Province
- Coordinates: 9°31′39″S 77°13′50″W
- Max. length: 800 metres (2,625 ft)
- Max. width: 280 metres (919 ft)
- Max. depth: 12 metres (39 ft)
- Surface elevation: 4,314 metres (14,154 ft)

Yanaqucha (Quechua yana "black, very dark", qucha "lake", "black lake", Hispanicized spelling Yanacocha) is a lake in the Cordillera Blanca in the Andes of Peru located in, Chavín de Huantar District, Huari Province, Ancash Region. It is situated at a height of about 4,314 metres (14,154 ft), about 800 metres (2,625 ft) long and 280 metres (919 ft) at its widest point. It has a depth of about 12 metres (39 ft). Yanaqucha lies in the Chacpar gorge north-west of Chavín de Huantar belonging to the Huascarán National Park. It supplies the local people with drinking water.

The lake is surrounded by plants like ichhu (Stipa ichu), lliqllish qura (Werneria nubigena), warwash hembra (Gynoxis sp.), ankush (Senecio canescens) and champa estrella (Plantago rigida). There is also trout in the lake. This is a place to watch birds like the yellow-billed teal, the blue-winged teal, the Andean gull and the Andean goose.
