= Cajay District =

Coordinates: 9°11′23″S 78°02′29″W

Cajay
- District
- Interactive map of Cajay
- Country: Peru
- Region: Ancash
- Province: Huari
- Founded: January 13, 1961
- Capital: Cajay

Government
  - Mayor: Marcotulio Mendoza Cadillo

Area
  - Total: 159.35 km^{2} (61.53 sq mi)
- Elevation: 3,050 m (10,010 ft)

Population (2007 census)
  - Total: 3,018
  - Density: 18.94/km^{2} (49.05/sq mi)
- Time zone: UTC-5 (PET)
- UBIGEO: 021003

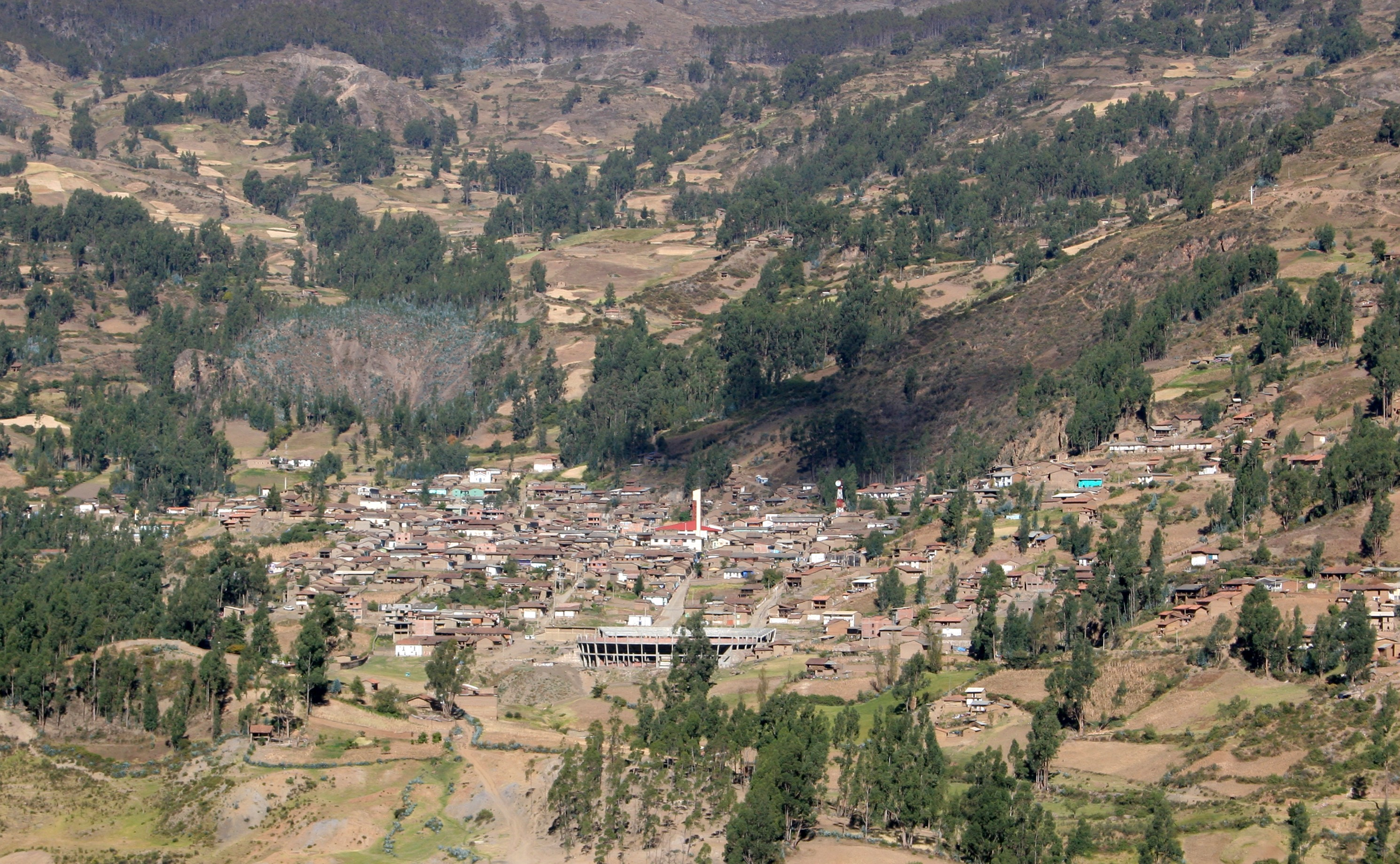
Panoramic view of Huari, Ancash, Peru

Cajay District is one of sixteen districts of the Huari Province in Peru.

== Geography ==
One of the highest peaks of the province is P'unqu Chakayuq at approximately 4,400 m (14,400 ft). Other mountains are listed below:

- Chipta Chaka
- Hatun Qura
- Hirka
- Puka Mach'ay
- Pukyu
- Putaqa Hirka
- Phiruru
- Qiwlla
- Rikachakuna
- Yana Qucha
- Yuraq Qucha

== Ethnic groups ==
The people in the district are mainly indigenous citizens of Quechua descent. Quechua is the language which the majority of the population (93.76%) learnt to speak in childhood, 5.78% of the residents started speaking using the Spanish language (2007 Peru Census).

== See also ==
- Markahirka
