= Millu Hirka =

Mountain in Peru

- Location within Peru

Highest point
- Elevation: 4,900 m (16,100 ft)
- Coordinates: 9°24′36″S 77°17′20″W

Geography
- Location: Peru, Ancash Region
- Parent range: Andes, Cordillera Blanca

Millu Hirka (Quechua millu salty, Ancash Quechua hirka mountain, Hispanicized spelling Millujirca) is a mountain in the Cordillera Blanca in the Andes of Peru, about 4,900 m (16,076 ft) high. It is situated in the Ancash Region, Huari Province, Huari District. Millu Hirka lies northeast of Antap'iti and southeast of Tullparahu. Milluqucha ("salty lake", Millucocha) is the name of the lake north of the mountain.
