= Rapayan District =

Coordinates: 9°12′00″S 76°45′36″W

Rapayan
- District
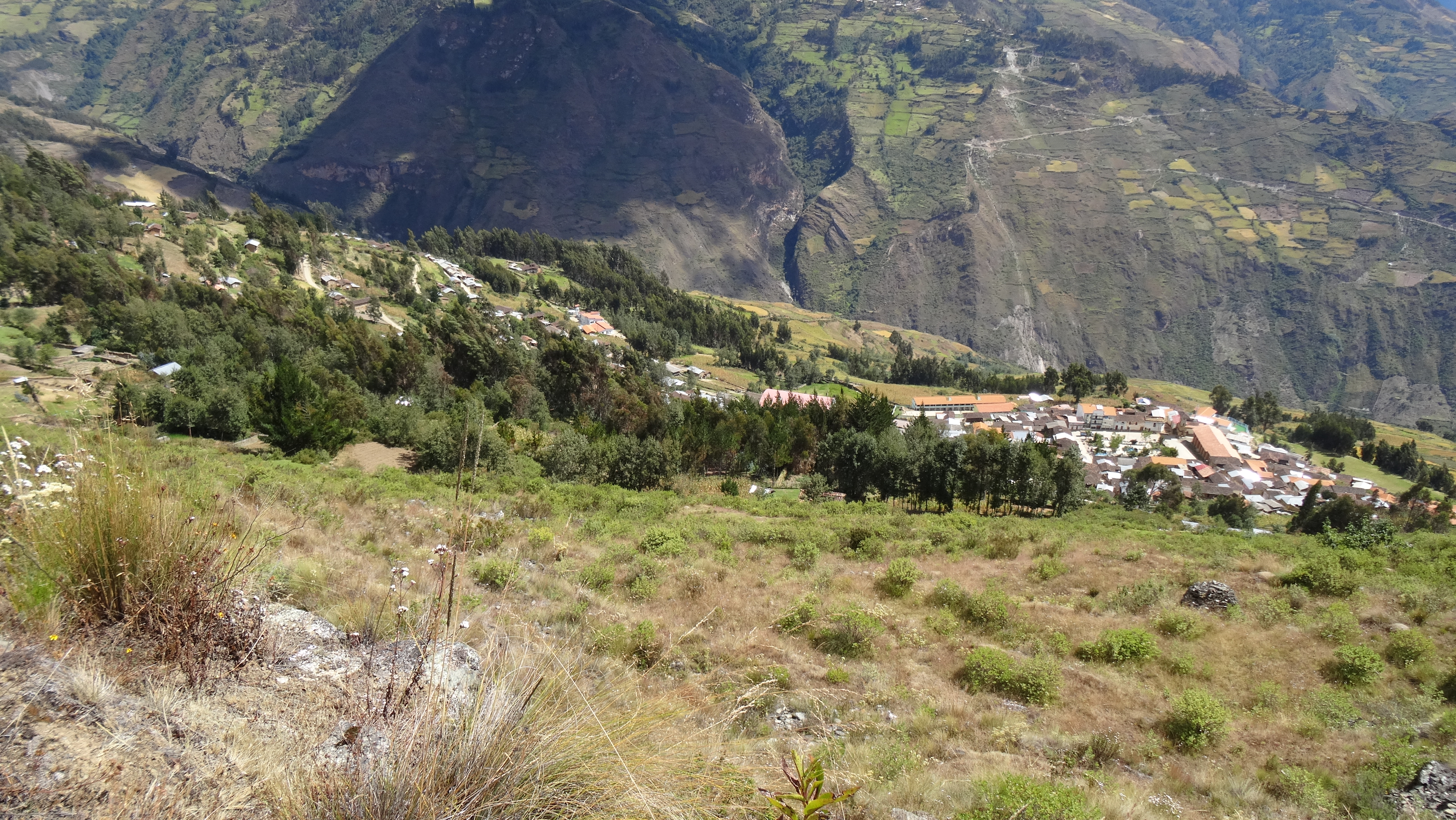
- Rapayan District
- Interactive map of Rapayan
- Country: Peru
- Region: Ancash
- Province: Huari
- Founded: September 16, 1952
- Capital: Rapayan

Government
  - Mayor: Berino Olortegui Urbano

Area
  - Total: 143.34 km^{2} (55.34 sq mi)
- Elevation: 3,238 m (10,623 ft)

Population (2005 census)
  - Total: 1,742
  - Density: 12.15/km^{2} (31.48/sq mi)
- Time zone: UTC-5 (PET)
- UBIGEO: 021013

Rapayan District is one of sixteen districts of the Huari Province in Peru.

== Ethnic groups ==
The people in the district are mainly indigenous citizens of Quechua descent. Quechua is the language which the majority of the population (62.95%) learnt to speak in childhood, 36.18% of the residents started speaking using the Spanish language (2007 Peru Census).
