= Condor Tocllana =

Mountain in Peru

- Location within Peru

Highest point
- Elevation: 4,400 m (14,400 ft)
- Coordinates: 9°31′43.6″S 76°57′43.2″W

Geography
- Location: Peru, Ancash Region
- Parent range: Andes

Kuntur Tuqllana (possibly from Quechua kuntur condor, tuqlla trap, -na a suffix, 'where the condor is caught in a trap') is a mountain in the Andes of Peru which reaches a height of approximately 4,400 m (14,400 ft). It is located in the Ancash Region, Huari Province, Chana District.
