= Uco District =

Coordinates: 9°11′24″S 76°55′48″W

Uco
- District
- Interactive map of Uco
- Country: Peru
- Region: Ancash
- Province: Huari
- Capital: Uco

Government
  - Mayor: Teodoro Tarazona Principe

Area
  - Total: 53.61 km^{2} (20.70 sq mi)
- Elevation: 3,336 m (10,945 ft)

Population (2005 census)
  - Total: 1,648
  - Density: 30.74/km^{2} (79.62/sq mi)
- Time zone: UTC-5 (PET)
- UBIGEO: 021016

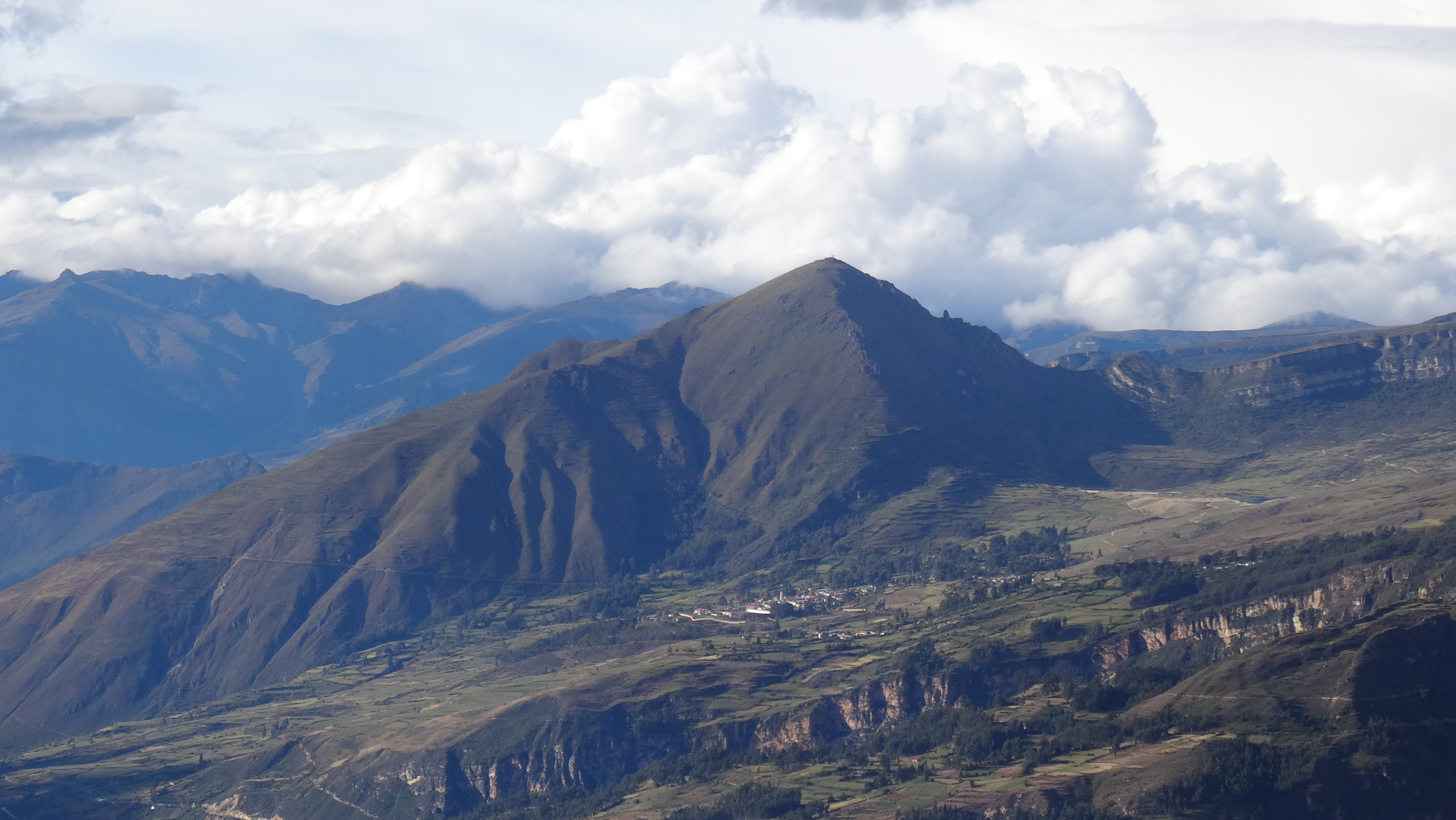
Part of the Uco district (C.P. Uco and the San Cristobal hill) seen from the northwest slope of the Jirca Mission (Huacachi district).

Uco District is one of sixteen districts of the Huari Province in Peru.

== Ethnic groups ==
The people in the district are mainly indigenous citizens of Quechua descent. Quechua is the language which the majority of the population (58.85%) learnt to speak in childhood, 40.80% of the residents started speaking using the Spanish language (2007 Peru Census).
