= Puka Mach'ay =

Mountain in Peru

- Location within Peru

Highest point
- Elevation: 5,000 m (16,000 ft)
- Coordinates: 9°46′18″S 77°14′04″W

Geography
- Location: Peru, Ancash Region
- Parent range: Andes, Cordillera Blanca

Puka Mach'ay (Quechua puka red, mach'ay cave, "red cave", also spelled Pucamachay) is a mountain in the Cordillera Blanca in the Andes of Peru, about 5,000 m (16,404 ft) high. It is located in the Ancash Region, Huari Province, Chavín de Huantar District. Puka Mach'ay lies east of Qishqi. One of the little lakes south of it is named Pukaqucha (Quechua for "red lake").
