= Kunkush (Huari) =

Mountain in Peru

- Location within Peru

Highest point
- Elevation: 4,400 m (14,400 ft)
- Coordinates: 9°11′22″S 76°52′19″W

Geography
- Location: Peru, Ancash Region
- Parent range: Andes

Kunkush (Ancash Quechua for Puya raimondii, also spelled Cuncush) is a mountain in the Andes of Peru which reaches a height of approximately 4,400 m (14,400 ft). It is located in the Ancash Region, Huari Province, Paucas District.
