= Huari District =

Coordinates: 9°22′08″S 77°14′13″W

Huari Wari
- District
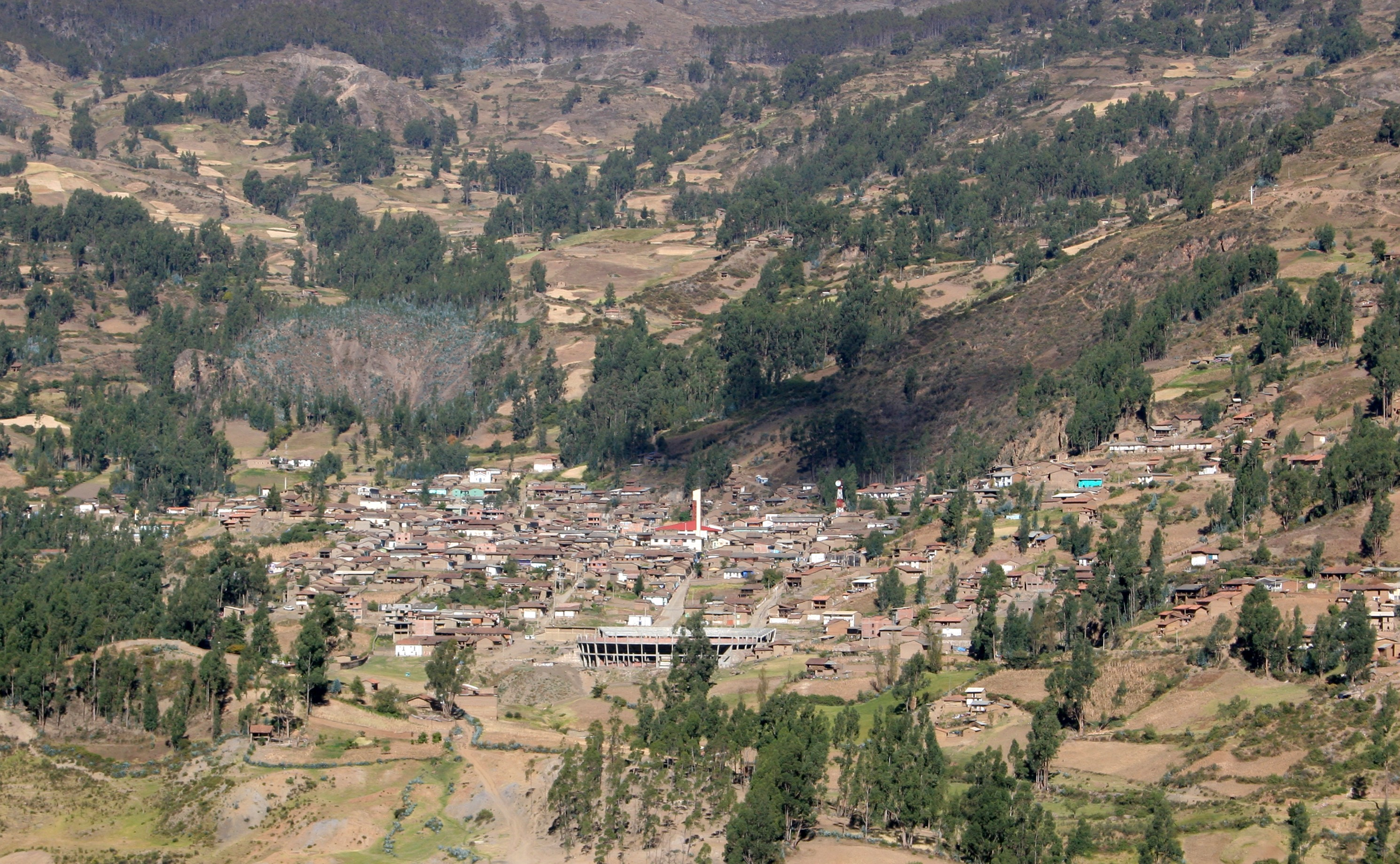
- Huari
- Interactive map of Huari
- Country: Peru
- Region: Ancash
- Province: Huari
- Capital: Huari

Government
  - Mayor: Luis Alberto Sanchez

Area
  - Total: 398.91 km^{2} (154.02 sq mi)
- Elevation: 3,149 m (10,331 ft)

Population (2017)
  - Total: 9,178
  - Density: 23.01/km^{2} (59.59/sq mi)
- Time zone: UTC-5 (PET)
- UBIGEO: 021001

Huari is one of the 16 districts that integrates the Peruvian Huari Province in the Ancash region. The district consists of the city of Huari, 15 small villages and 22 annexes.

== History ==
Tradition says that Huari was founded by Juán Huarín. The foundation corresponded to the viceroyalty of Francisco de Toledo, Count of Oropesa in 1572, and was founded under the name of Santo Domingo de Huari. Its creation as a district was carried out during the Peruvian War of Independence.

== Geography ==
The Cordillera Blanca traverses the western part of the district. The highest peak of the district is Rurichinchay at 6,309 m (20,699 ft). Other mountains are listed below:

- Awki
- Chunta
- Hatun Hirka
- Kinwa Hirka
- Kiswar Qaqa
- Millu Hirka
- Pukarahu
- Puma Wayin
- Qaqapampa
- Runtuy
- Tarush Wachanan
- Tullparahu
- Tupuq Hirka
- Yana Qaqa

Located on the western skirts of the eastern mountain range in the Callejón de Conchucos valley (running parallel to the Callejón de Huaylas valley) Huari is characterised by its unique panoramas. The Mosna River feeds the Marañón River, which, in turn, gives birth to the Amazon River.

The Huari District is located 3,149 meters above sea level.

== Demographics ==
The district occupies an area of 398.91 km^{2} and its population according to the Peru 1993 Census was of 8,915 inhabitants.

== Politics ==
The capital of the district is the city of Huari, which is also the provincial capital of Huari.

== Ethnic groups ==
The people in the district are mainly indigenous citizens of Quechua descent. Quechua is the language which the majority of the population (65.75%) learnt to speak in childhood, while 33.60% of the residents started speaking using the Spanish language (2007 Peru Census).

== Religious figures and holidays ==
Haurinos holy patron include the Virgin of the Rosary (the Huarina Virgin is called to him), whose supervisory celebration is celebrated on the 7 of October, and Santo Domingo de Guzmán. Additional religious festivals include Easter and Corpus Christi.

== Local food ==
Huarinos, in the region, are also referred to as mishi kanka, (Quechua for "roasted cat"). That is to say that Huarinos are people who eat roasted cat.

Other traditional plates of the district include sharp of guinea pig (traditional plate of the mountain culinaria of Peru) and the Llajhuari. The Llajhuari is a plate of Huari, and is a precursory of buffets; it consists of a mini-buffet of several "sharp ones" served on one plate (generally made of wood, called p'uku, Quechua for plate), accompanied, of course, of "poto" (vasija of pumpkin or zapallo) of chicha of jora. The word llajhuari, translated from Spanish, would mean: "something worthy to be licked".

== Flora and fauna ==
Huari's unique flora and fauna include the waqanku (Masdevallia amabilis), condors, pumas and the "spectacled" bear.

== People ==
Eleazar Guzmán Barrón was a local biochemist who in 1942 was called by the Government of the United States to join the United States Atomic Energy Commission, overseeing the study and development of the atomic pump.

== Economy ==
Main the economic activity of the district is agriculture, specifically coffee, apple and peach.

== See also ==
- Challwaqucha
