= Chalhuacocha (Huari) =

Lake in Peru

- Location within Peru
- Location: Peru; Ancash Region
- Coordinates: 9°22′2.5″S 77°17′10.8″W
- Surface area: 0.153655 km^{2} (153,655 m^{2})
- Surface elevation: 4,223 m (13,855 ft)

Chalhuacocha (possibly from Quechua challwa fish, qucha lake, "fish lake") is a lake in Peru located in the Ancash Region, Huari Province, Huari District. It is situated at a height of 4,223 m (13,855 ft) comprising an area of 0.153655 km^{2} (153,655 m^{2}). Chalhuacocha lies near the Rurichinchay valley, northeast of the peak of Rurichinchay.
