= Jacabamba =

Mountain in Peru

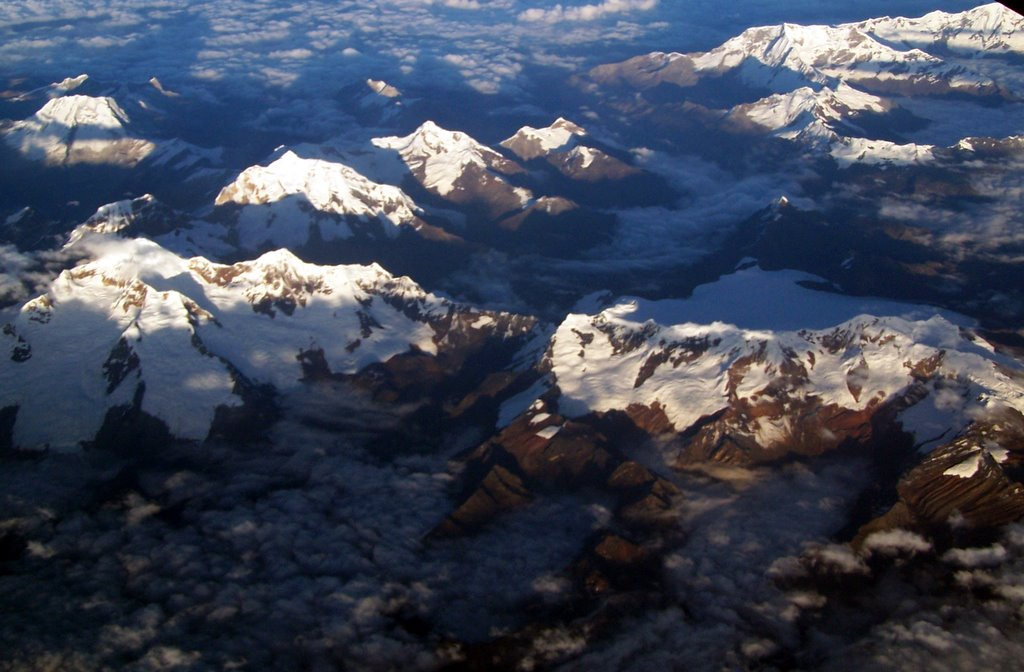
- Aerial view of the Cordillera Blanca as seen from the east with Jacabamba in the center (the one with three spots of snow on its eastern slope)

Highest point
- Elevation: 5,566 m (18,261 ft)
- Coordinates: 9°19′19″S 77°19′15″W

Geography
- Location within Peru
- Location: Peru, Ancash Region
- Parent range: Andes, Cordillera Blanca

Jacabamba (possibly from Quechua qaqa rock, pampa a large plain, "rock plain") is a 5,566-metre-high (18,261 ft) mountain in the Cordillera Blanca in the Andes of Peru. It is situated in the Ancash Region, Asunción Province, Chacas District, in the Carhuaz Province, Marcará District, and in the Huari Province, Huari District. Jacabamba lies between mount Copap to the north and Chinchey to the south. Lake Rurichinchay lies at its feet.

The rivers Jacabamba and Rurichinchay originate on the east side of the mountain and flow to the south-west. They belong to the watershed of the Marañón River.
