= Huari province =

Coordinates: 9°22′08″S 77°14′13″W

Huari
- Province
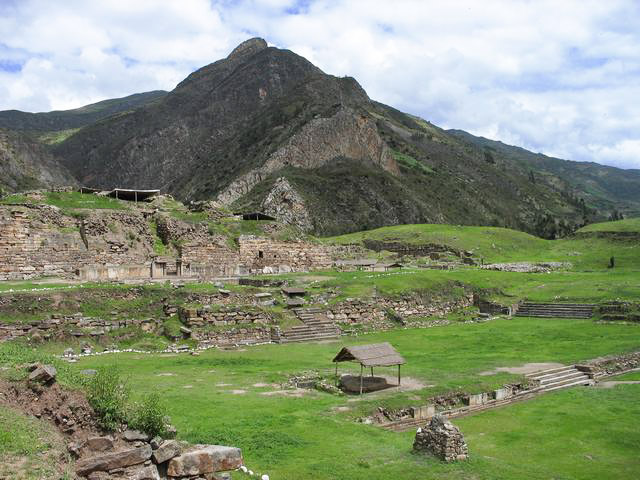
- The UNESCO World Heritage Site of Chavín de Huantar

- Flag Coat of arms

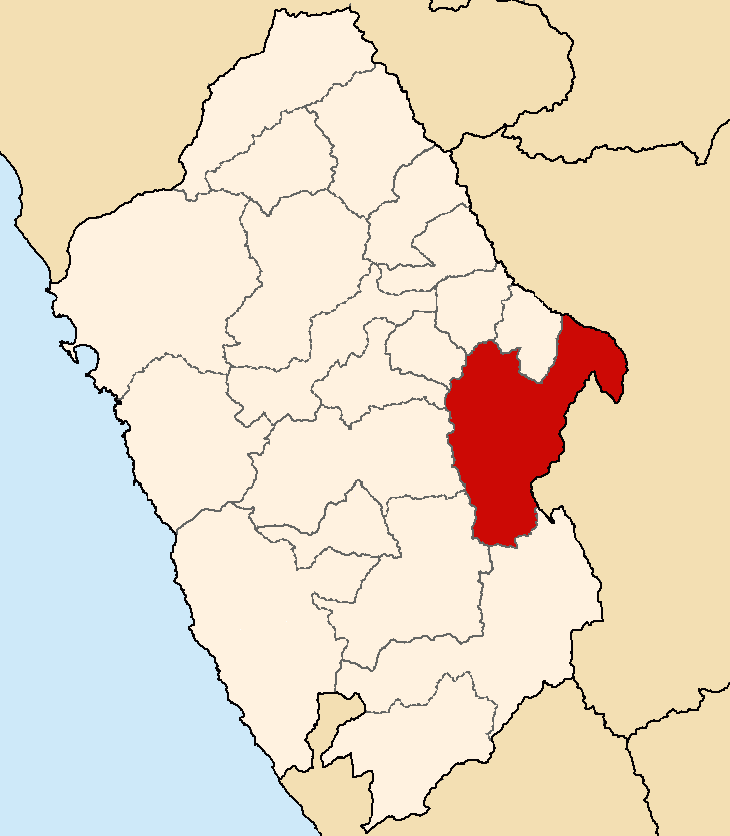
- Location of Huari in the Ancash Region
- Country: Peru
- Region: Ancash
- Capital: Huari

Government
  - Mayor: Luis Alberto Sánchez Urbizagástegui (2019–2022)

Area
  - Total: 2,771.9 km^{2} (1,070.2 sq mi)
- Elevation: 3,149 m (10,331 ft)

Population
  - Total: 58,714
  - Density: 21.182/km^{2} (54.861/sq mi)
- Website: Official website

Huari is one of twenty provinces of the Ancash Region in Peru. Its seat is Huari.

== Geography ==
The Cordillera Blanca traverses the western part of the province. Some of the highest peaks of the province are Rurichinchay and Wantsan. Other mountains are listed below:

- Anku
- Artisa
- Awaq Wank'a
- Awki
- Chunta
- Hatun Chakra
- Hatun Hirka
- Hatun Wak'a
- Hatun Yanaqa Hirka
- Ichik Challwa
- Ichik Chakra
- Kayish
- Kinwa Hirka
- Kiswar Qaqa
- Kunkush
- Kuntur Tuqllana
- Kuntur Wank'a
- Khuchi Mach'ay
- Map'arahu
- Mata Qaqa
- Millwa Pilluy
- Millu Hirka
- Mullu Punta
- Mururahu
- Pamparahu
- Puka Mach'ay
- Pukarahu (Bol.-Huari)
- Pukarahu (Huari)
- Pukyu
- Puma Wayin
- Purway Kinwa
- Putaqa Hirka
- Puywan
- Phiruru
- P'unqu Chakayuq
- Qaqa Mach'ay
- Qaqa Wasi
- Qaqapampa
- Qarwakancha
- Qawish
- Qishqi
- Qiwlla
- Quchapata
- Quri Lanki
- Rima Rima
- Runtuy
- Ruriq
- Shawanka Punta
- Tampu
- Tarush Wachanan
- Tuku
- Tullparahu
- Tuqtu
- Urwashrahu
- Usnu
- Ututu Punta
- Walla Kancha
- Waman Wayi
- Wank'a Punta
- Waraqayuq
- Yana Qaqa
- Yanamaray
- Yanarahu
- Yanaqucha
- Yuraq Wank'a
- Yuraq Yaku

== Political division ==
Huari is divided into sixteen districts, which are:

- Anra
- Cajay
- Chavín de Huantar
- Huacachi
- Huacchis
- Huachis
- Huantar
- Huari
- Masin
- Paucas
- Ponto
- Rahuapampa
- Rapayan
- San Marcos
- San Pedro de Chana
- Uco

== Ethnic groups ==
The people in the province are mainly indigenous citizens of Quechua descent. Quechua is the language which the majority of the population (78.05%) learnt to speak in childhood, 21.49% of the residents started speaking using the Spanish language (2007 Peru Census).

== Archaeological sites ==
The UNESCO World Heritage Site of Chavín de Huantar is the most famous archaeological site of the province. Another remarkable place with cave paintings and stone tombs (chullpa) is Markahirka.

== See also ==
- Allpaqucha
- Challwaqucha
- Hatun Qaqaqucha and Ichik Qaqaqucha
- Yanaqucha
