= Huari, Peru =

Huari Wari
- Town
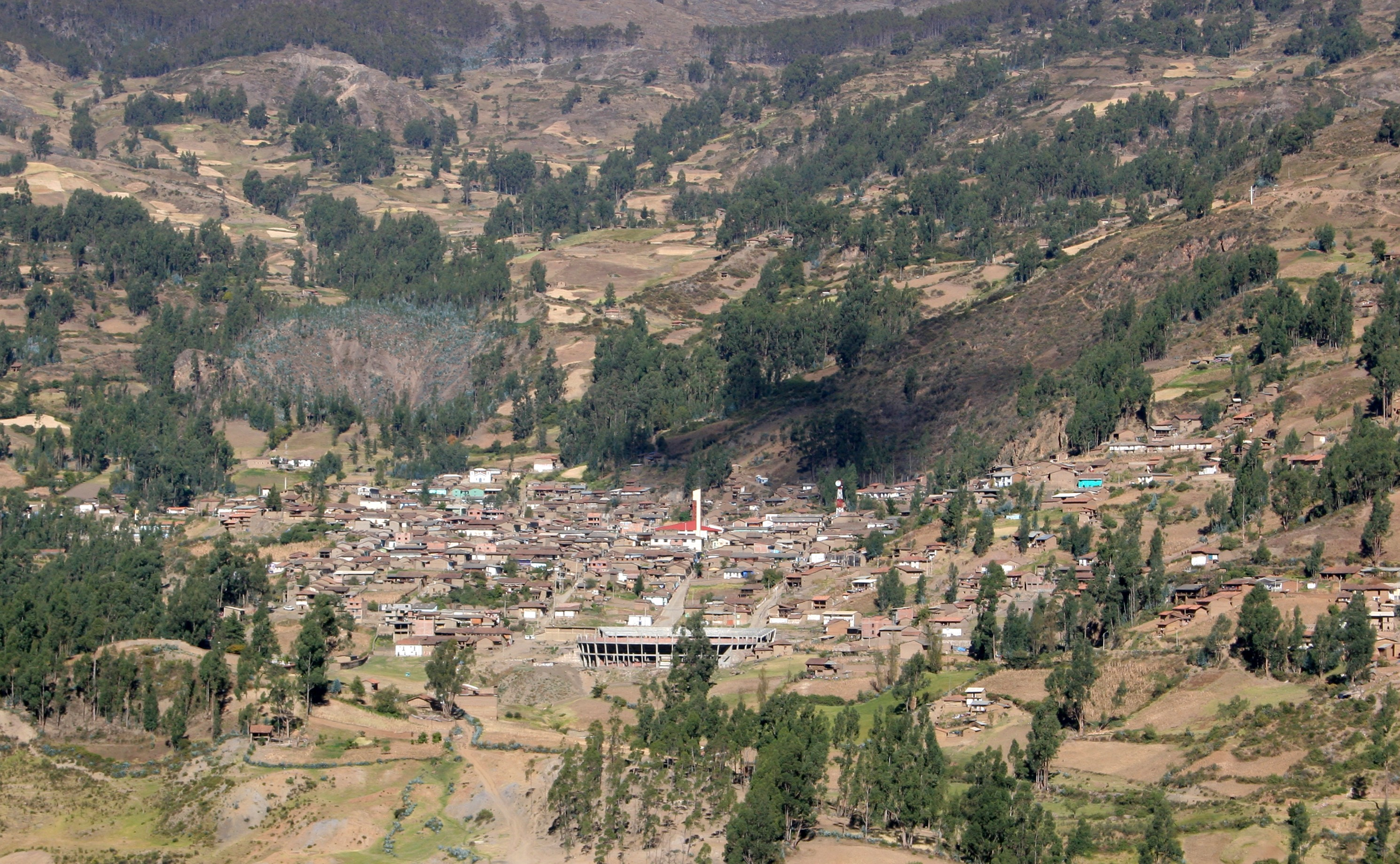

- Location within Peru
- Coordinates: 9°22′08″S 77°14′13″W
- Country: Peru
- Region: Ancash
- Province: Huari
- District: Huari
- Founded: 1572

Government
  - Mayor: Luis Alberto Sanchez
- Elevation: 3,149 m (10,331 ft)

Population (2018)
  - Total: 9,700

Huari is a small town in the Ancash Region in central Peru. It is the capital of the Huari Province. The town is situated on the eastern slope of the Andean mountain range known as the Cordillera Blanca. The economy of the province is primarily agricultural, with at least half the population engaged in subsistence horticulture, raising crops such as potatoes, sweet potatoes, other native tubers, quinoa, maize, wheat, barley, tomatoes, peppers, and various vegetables. Many residential households also raise a few animals, including goats, sheep, pigs, occasionally cattle, guinea pigs (cuy), rabbits, chickens, and ducks. Much of the trade in this rural area is conducted through barter.

Huari is connected to the electric grid, and in 2005, some of the surrounding villages were just beginning to be connected to the grid.

== History ==
=== Huari in the year 1965 ===
In the mid-1960s electricity was locally generated by a small hydroelectric plant. The plant supplied AC power from dusk to dawn; at dawn, the natural-stream water was diverted back into the water pipes that supplied potable water until dusk. Electricity and running water were available to less than a hundred Huari businesses, government offices, private residences, and the public school; as well as the Diocese of the (Roman Catholic) Bishop of Huari, and less than two dozen streetlights.

Several streets—mostly no wider than four meters—were cobbled and maintained for vehicular traffic. There were no concrete or asphalted streets, although many streets had raised cobbled sidewalks.

The drive from Huari westward to the Pan-American Highway during fair weather required six to eight hours on packed-earth and graveled roads until arriving at the asphalt-paved Pan-American Highway on the Pacific coast near the town of Comas. Crossing the Cordillera Blanca was facilitated by a one-lane tunnel, approximately 800 meters in length. This tunnel was a 5-meter cylindrical tube that had been blasted and cut through rock. The ceiling and walls were unfinished, and year-round water seepage at numerous places kept the rough but generally level one-lane roadway constantly muddy and covered with puddles. Crossing this generally east-west highway about halfway between the Cordillera Blanca and the Cordillera Blanca is the north-south highway between the Ancash capital, Huaraz, and the large ancient town of Recuay. From Huari, the city of Huaraz was a motor-vehicle trip of about four hours; the distance from Huari to Recuay was somewhat less.
