= Pucagaga Punta =

Mountain in Peru

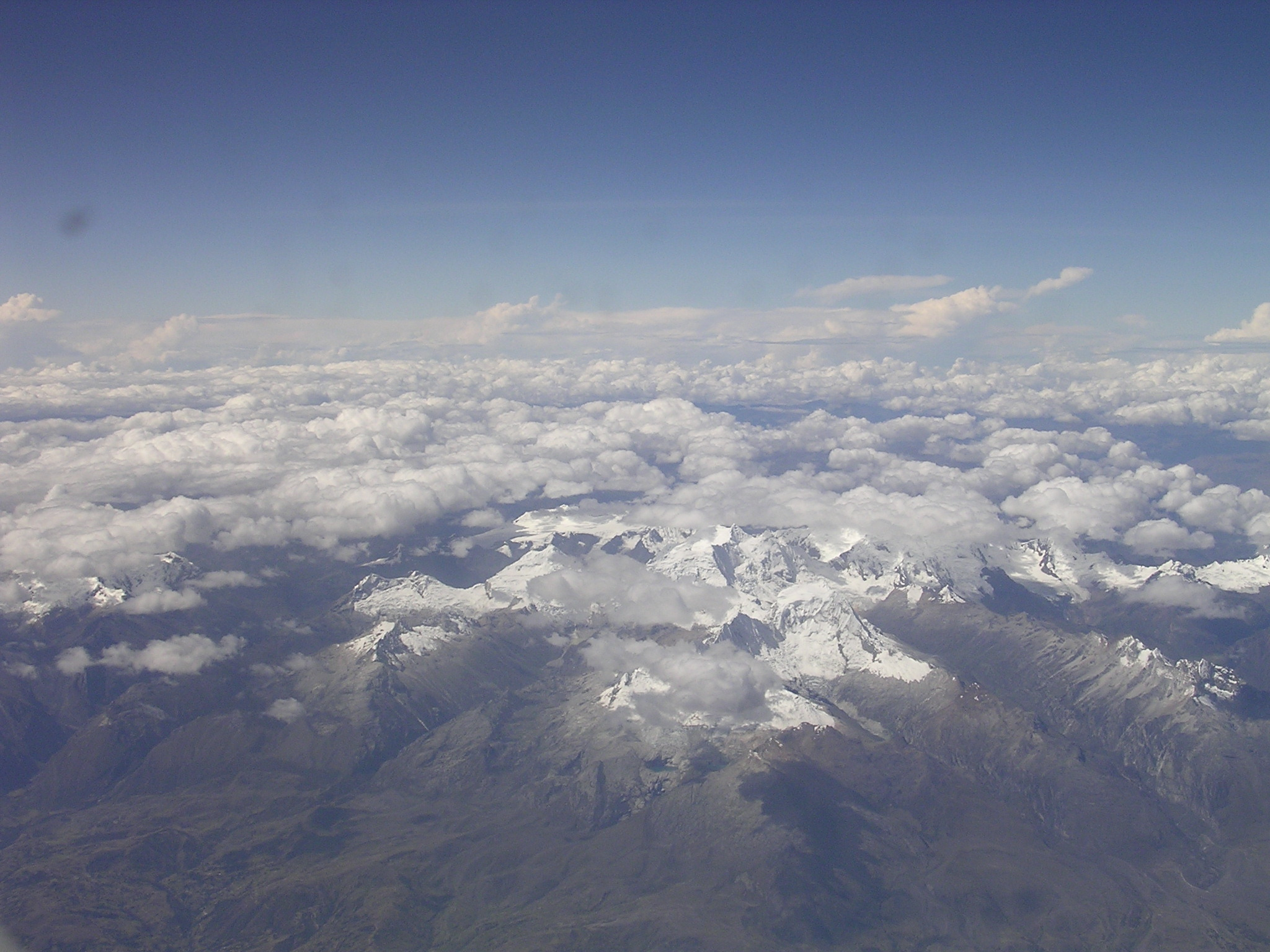
- Cordillera Blanca as seen from the west with Pucagaga Punta and Churup (lower-right)

Highest point
- Elevation: 5,461 m (17,917 ft)
- Coordinates: 9°27′20″S 77°24′14″W

Geography
- Location within Peru
- Location: Peru, Ancash Region
- Parent range: Andes, Cordillera Blanca

Pucagaga Punta or Pucagaga (possibly from Quechua puka red, qaqa rock, "red rock"; Spanish punta peak; ridge; first, before, in front of) is a mountain in the Cordillera Blanca in the Andes of Peru, 5,461 metres (17,917 ft) high. It is situated in the Ancash Region, Huaraz Province, Independencia District, northeast of Huaraz. Pucagaga lies south of Ranrapalca, next to Churup, northeast of it.
