= Rima Rima =

Mountain in Peru

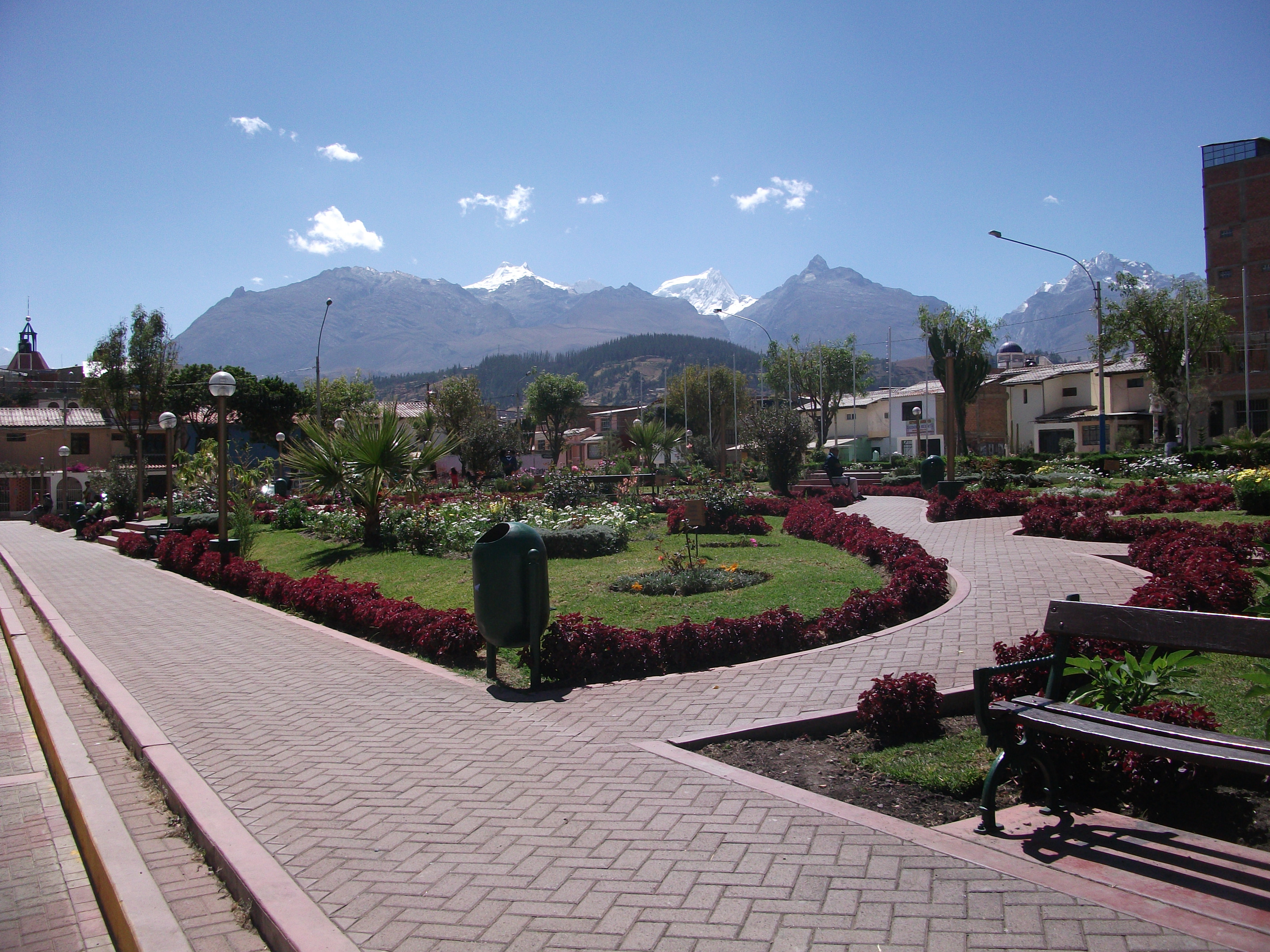
- Wallunarahu and Ranrapallqa (both snow-covered), Rima Rima and Churup (on the right) as seen from Huaraz

Highest point
- Elevation: 5,248 m (17,218 ft)
- Coordinates: 9°26′48″S 77°26′18″W

Geography
- Location within Peru
- Location: Peru, Ancash Region
- Parent range: Andes, Cordillera Blanca

Rima Rima (Quechua rima speaking, rima rima a flower (Ranunculus weberbaueri syn. Krapfia weberbaueri)), is a 5,248-metre-high (17,218 ft) mountain in the Cordillera Blanca in the Andes of Peru. It is situated in the Ancash Region, Huaraz Province, Independencia District, northeast of Huaraz (Waras). Rima Rima lies southeast of Wallunarahu, on the ridge southwest of Ranrapallqa.

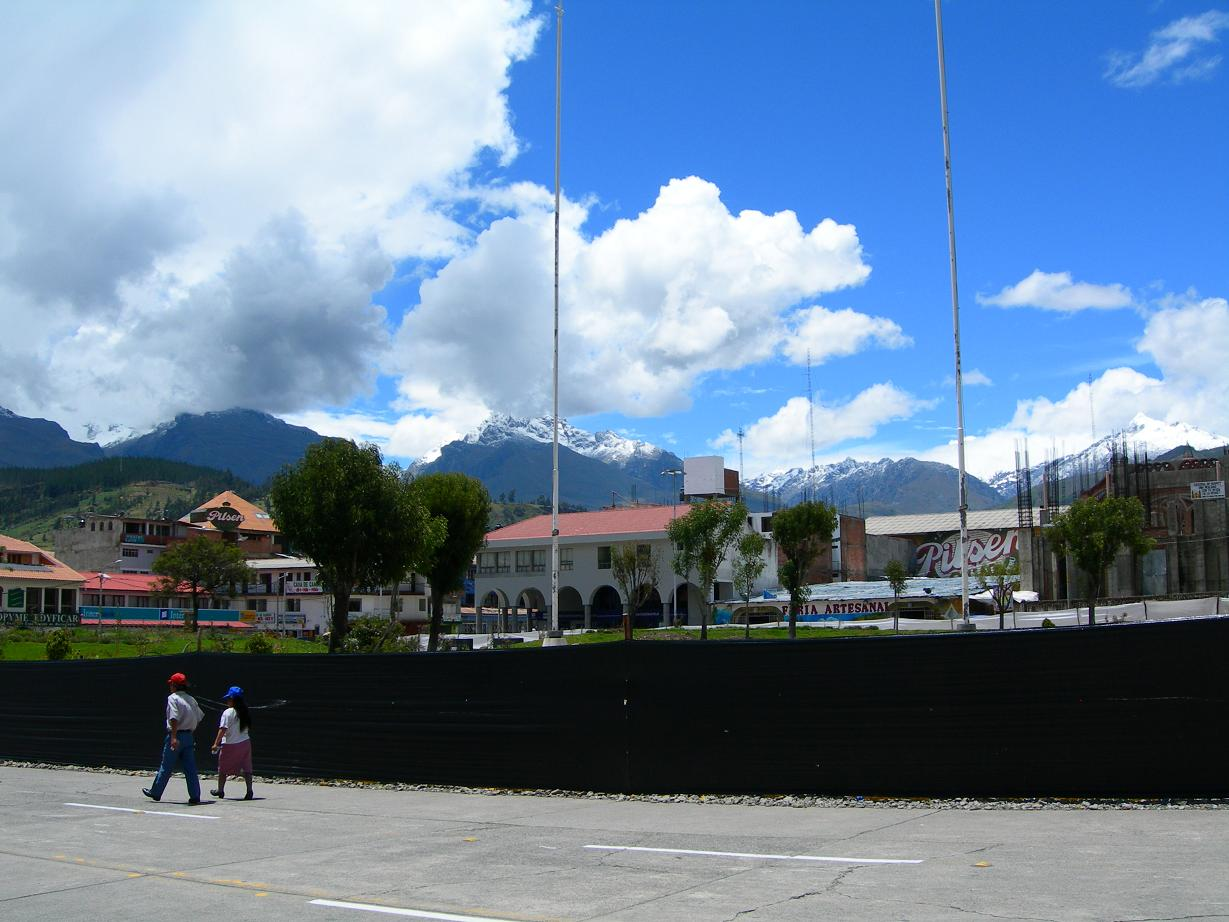
Ranrapallqa (in the distance), Rima Rima, Churup (middle, left), Qullapaqu and Wamashrahu as seen from Huaraz

== See also ==
- Churup
- Wamashrahu
