= Churup =

Mountain in Peru

- Tsurup
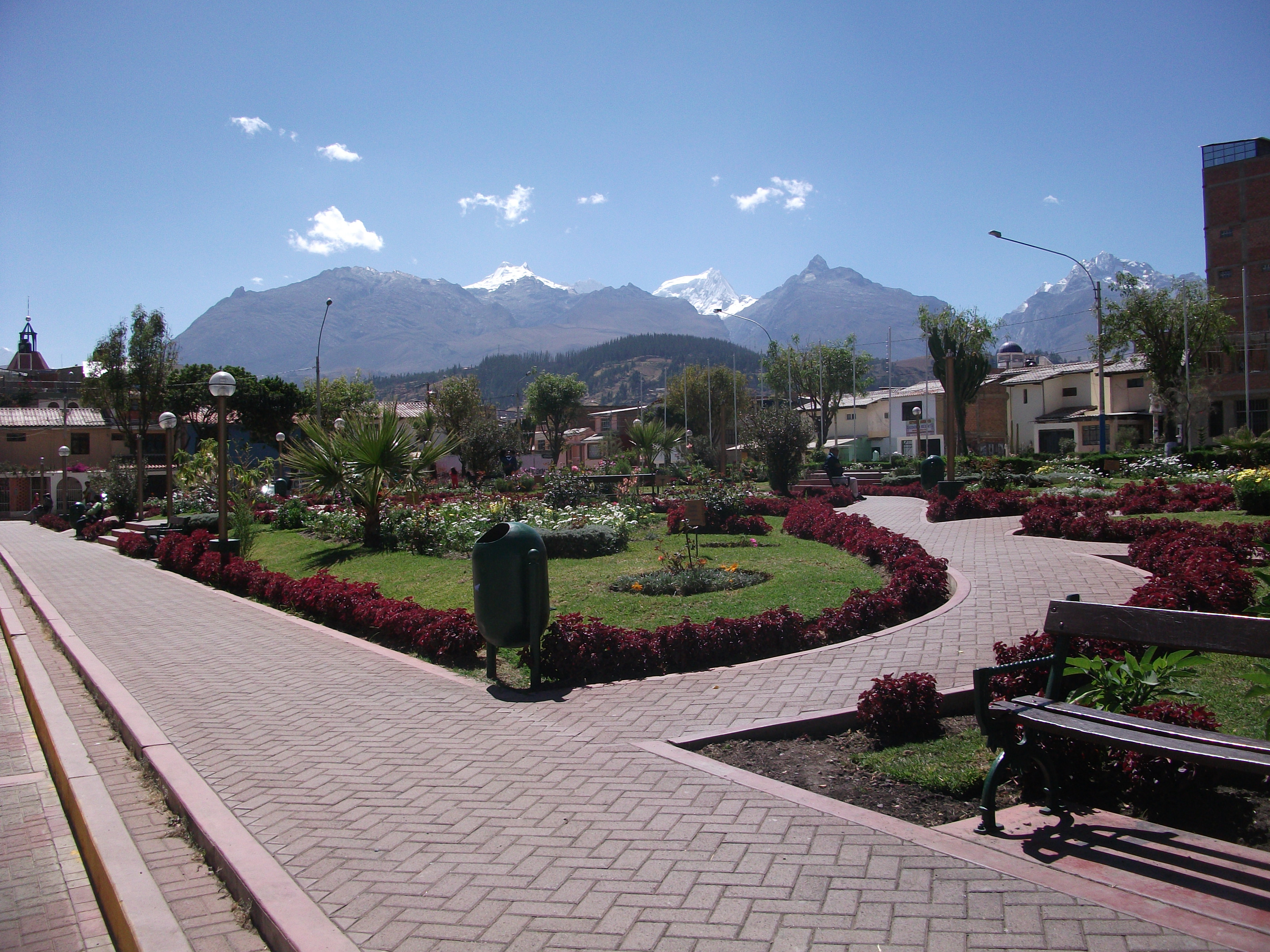
- Vallunaraju and Ranrapalca (both snow-covered), Rima Rima and Churup (on the right) as seen from Huaraz

Highest point
- Elevation: 5,493 m (18,022 ft)
- Coordinates: 9°28′09″S 77°24′57″W

Geography
- Location within Peru
- Location: Peru, Ancash Region
- Parent range: Andes, Cordillera Blanca

Climbing
- First ascent: 1-1954 via N.W. side: S. rock face-1962: S.W. face-1972: Variant S.W. face direct-1982: S.W. face (new route)-1983

Churup or Tsurup (possibly from Ancash Quechua) is a mountain in the Cordillera Blanca in the Andes of Peru, about 5,495 metres (18,028 ft) high. It is situated in the Ancash Region, Huaraz Province, Independencia District, north-east of Huaraz. Churup is situated south of the mountain Ranrapalca, between the Rima Rima in the north-west and Collapaco and Huamashraju in the south-east, at the entrance to the Quilcayhuanca valley. Lake Churup lies at the foot of the mountain.

== Gallery ==
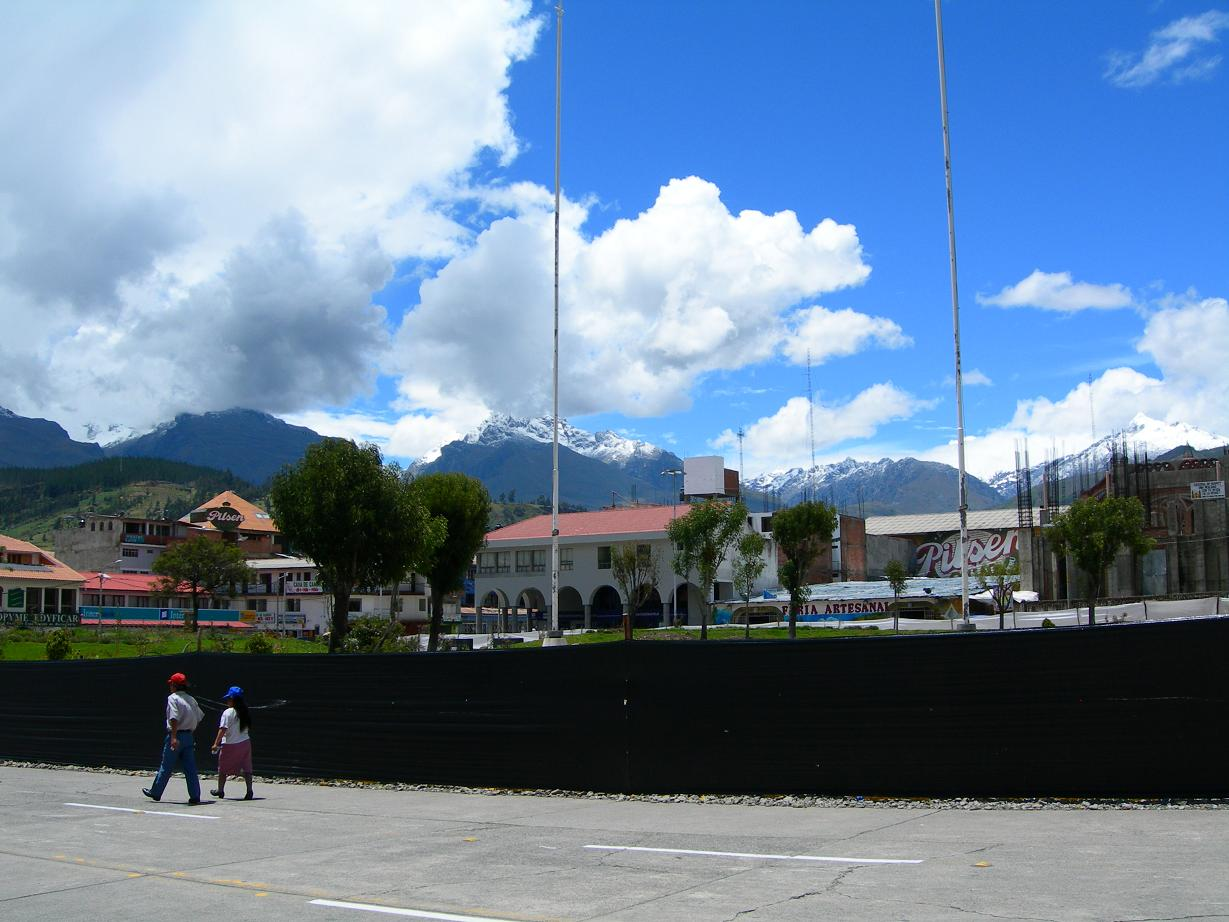
Ranrapalca (in the distance), Rima Rima, Churup (middle, left), Collapaco and Huamashraju as seen from Huaraz

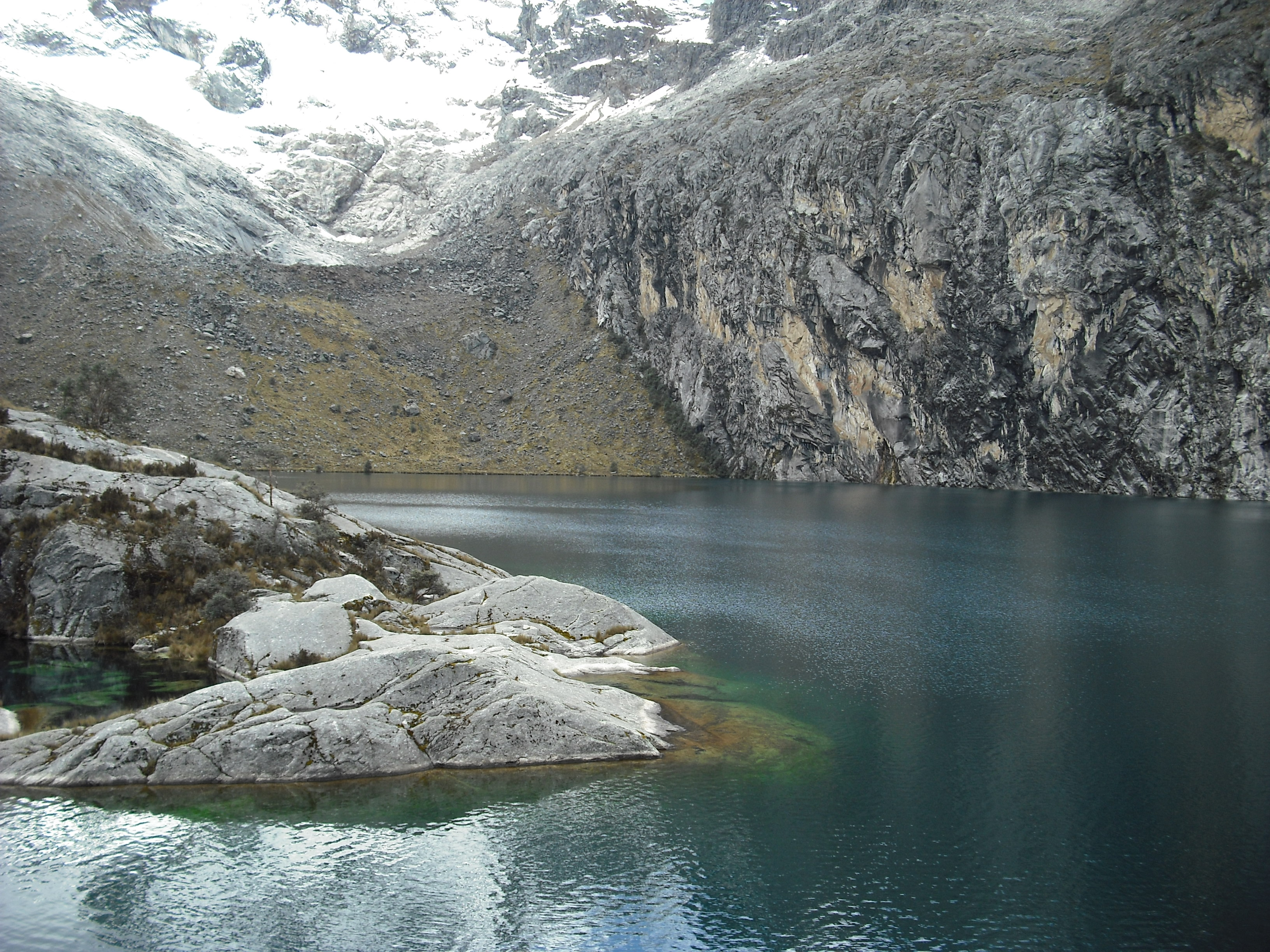
Churup Lake at the foot of the mountain

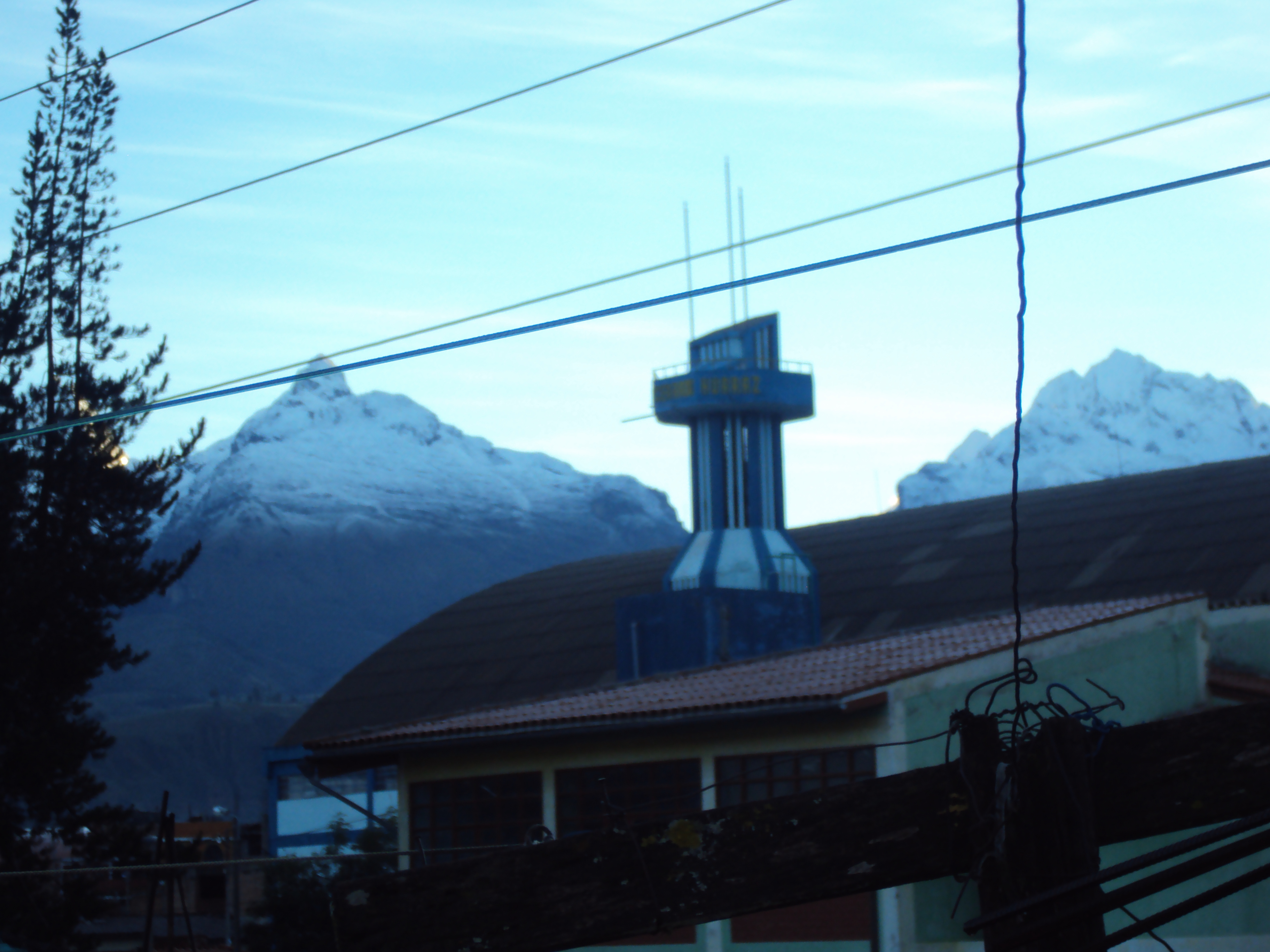
The mountains Rima Rima and Churup as seen from Huaraz
