= Huamashraju =

Mountain in Peru

- Yanahuacra, Rajo Colta
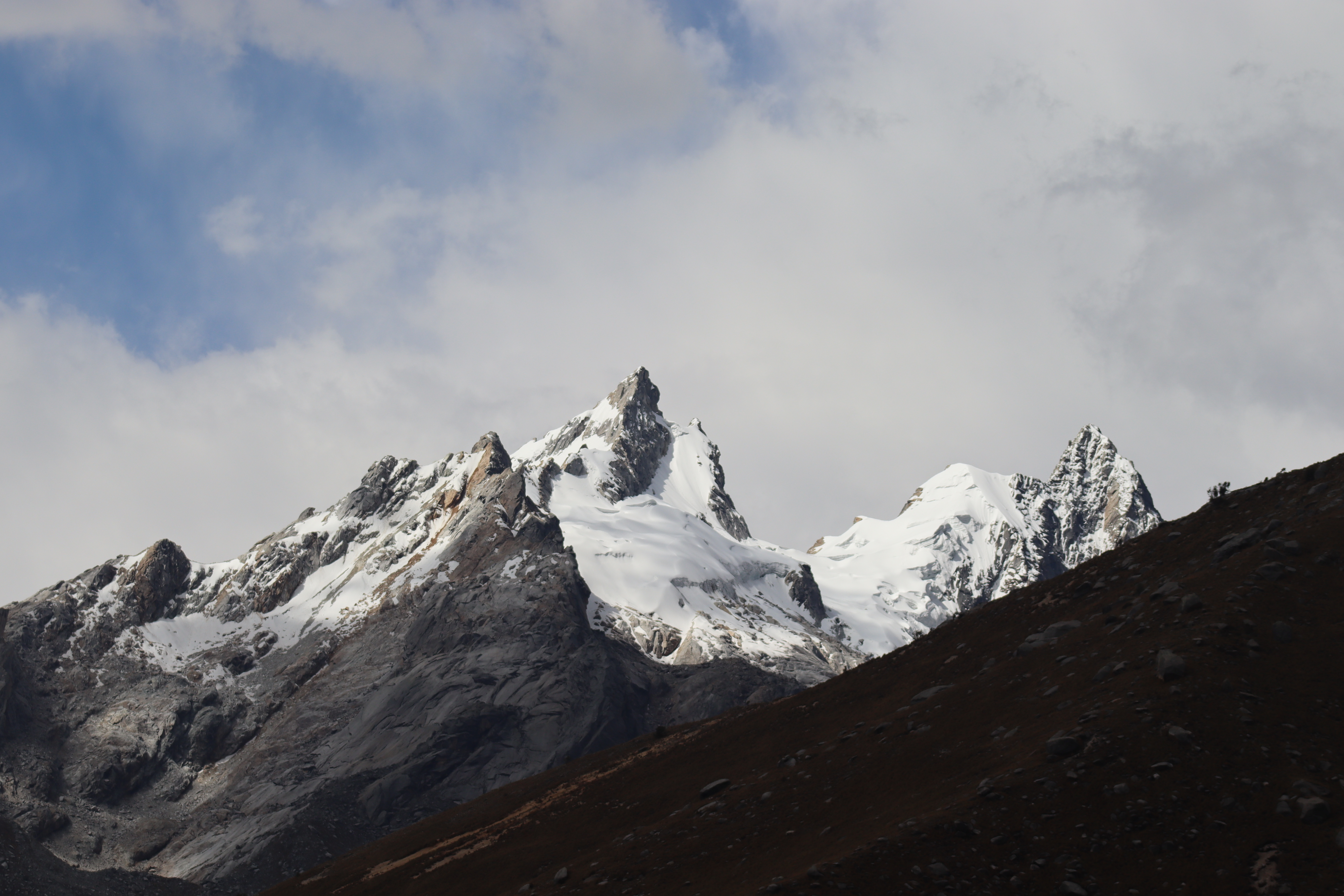
- Huamashraju, as seen from the west

Highest point
- Elevation: 5,434 m (17,828 ft)
- Coordinates: 9°31′30″S 77°23′06″W

Geography
- Location within Peru
- Location: Peru, Ancash Region
- Parent range: Andes, Cordillera Blanca

Climbing
- First ascent: 1954, J. Cabana and A. Soriano

Huamashraju, Wamashraju (possibly from Quechua rahu snow, ice, mountain with snow), Yanahuacra (possibly from Quechua yana black, waqra horn, "black horn") or Rajo Colta is a mountain in the Cordillera Blanca in the Andes of Peru, about 5,434 metres (17,828 ft) high. It is situated in the Ancash Region, Huaraz Province, Huaraz District. Huamashraju lies east of the town of Huaraz, west of Huantsán and northwest of Shacsha and Cashan.

== Gallery ==
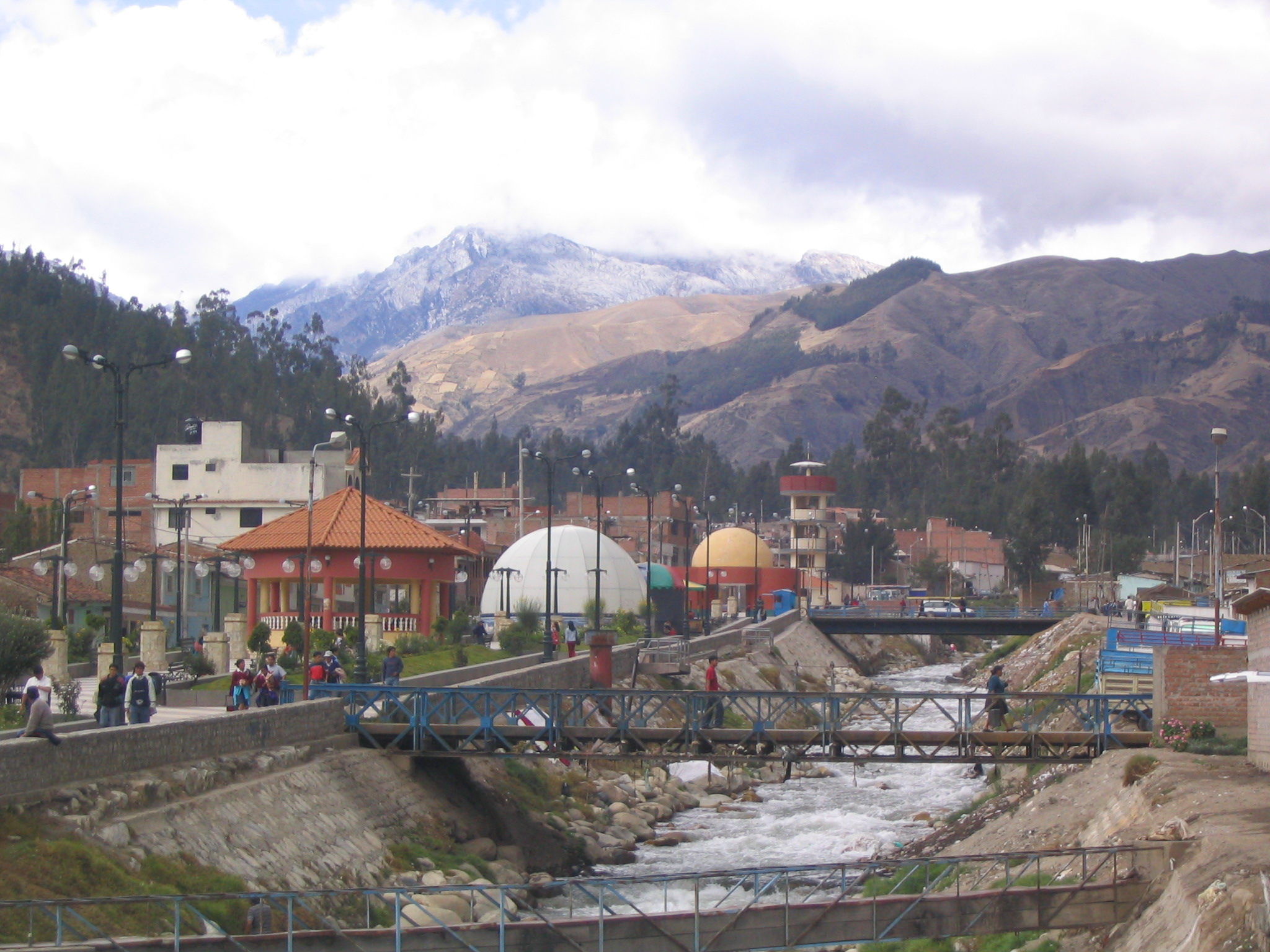
Huamashraju as seen from Huaraz

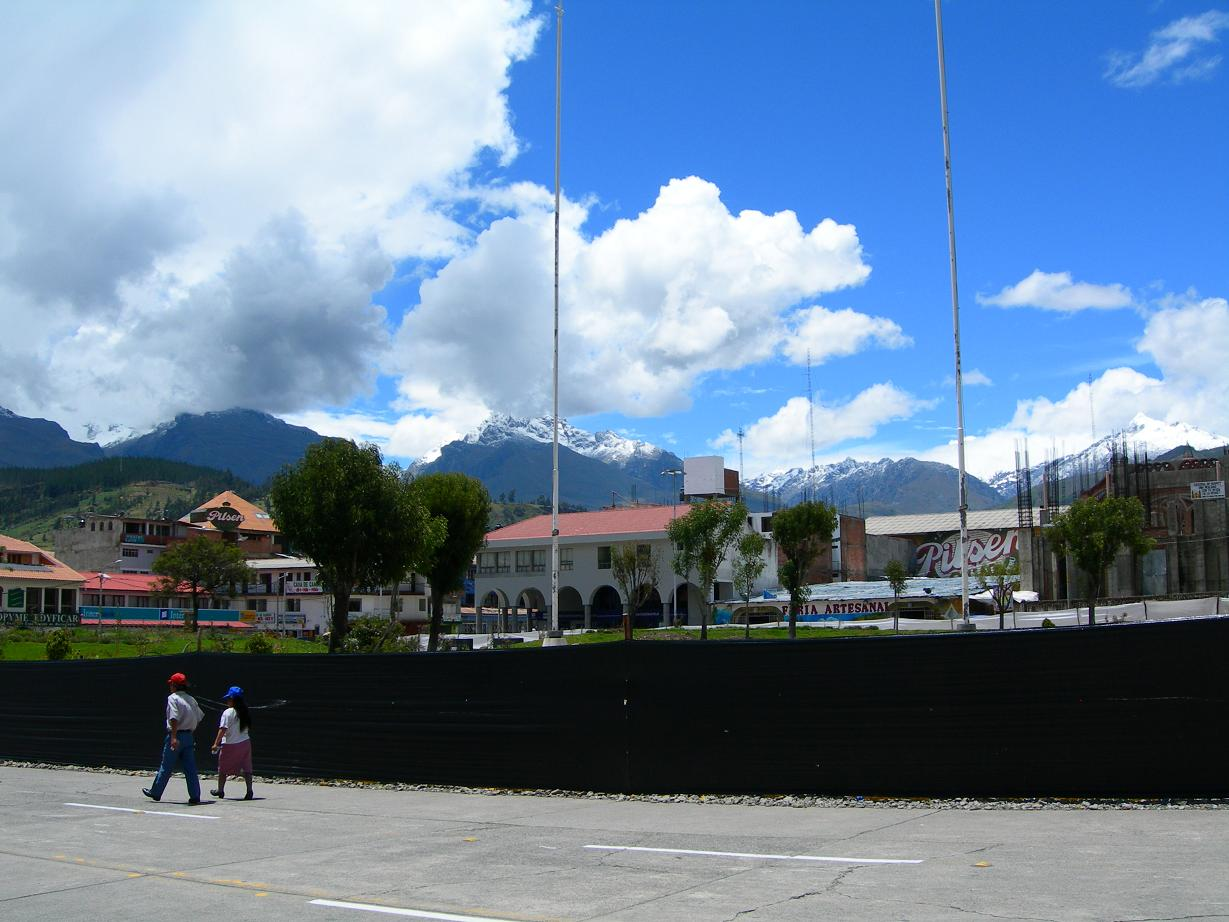
Ranrapalca (in the distance), Rima Rima, Churup (middle, left), Collapaco and Huamashraju as seen from Huaraz

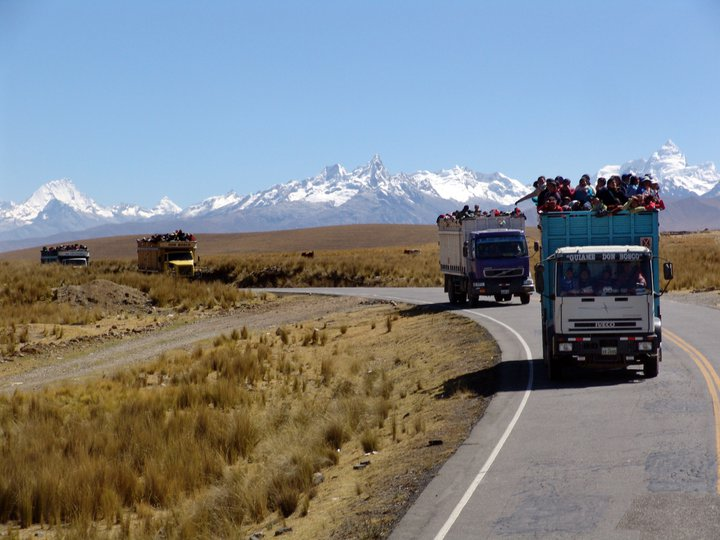
Ranrapalca (on the left), Huamashraju, Cashan, Shacsha (center) and Huantsán (on the right) as seen from the southwest

== See also ==
- Churup
- Rima Rima
