= Vallunaraju =

Mountain in Peru

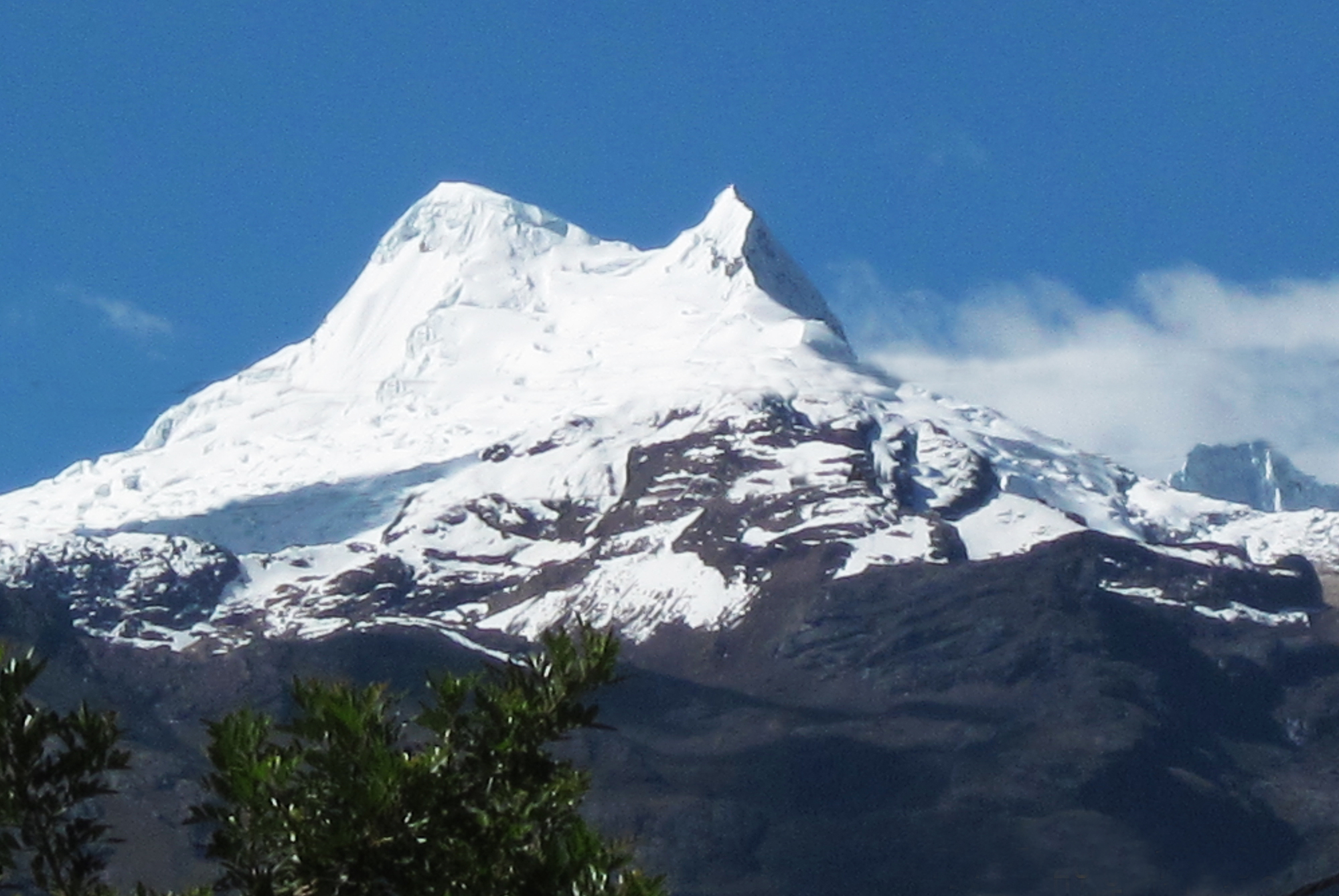
- Vallunaraju

Highest point
- Elevation: 5,686 m (18,655 ft)
- Prominence: 136 m (446 ft)
- Coordinates: 9°25′20″S 77°27′23″W

Geography
- Location within Peru
- Location: Ancash, Peru
- Parent range: Andes, Cordillera Blanca

Climbing
- First ascent: 1949, A. and M. Szepessy

Vallunaraju or Wallunaraju (possibly from Ancash Quechua walluy to cut, wallu earless, someone whose ears are amputated -na a nominalising suffix, Quechua rahu snow, ice, mountain with snow,) is a mountain in the Cordillera Blanca in the Andes of Peru, about 5,686 metres (18,655 ft) high and located in Huaraz Province, Ancash. Vallunaraju lies south west of Ranrapalca and Ocshapalca.

== Images ==
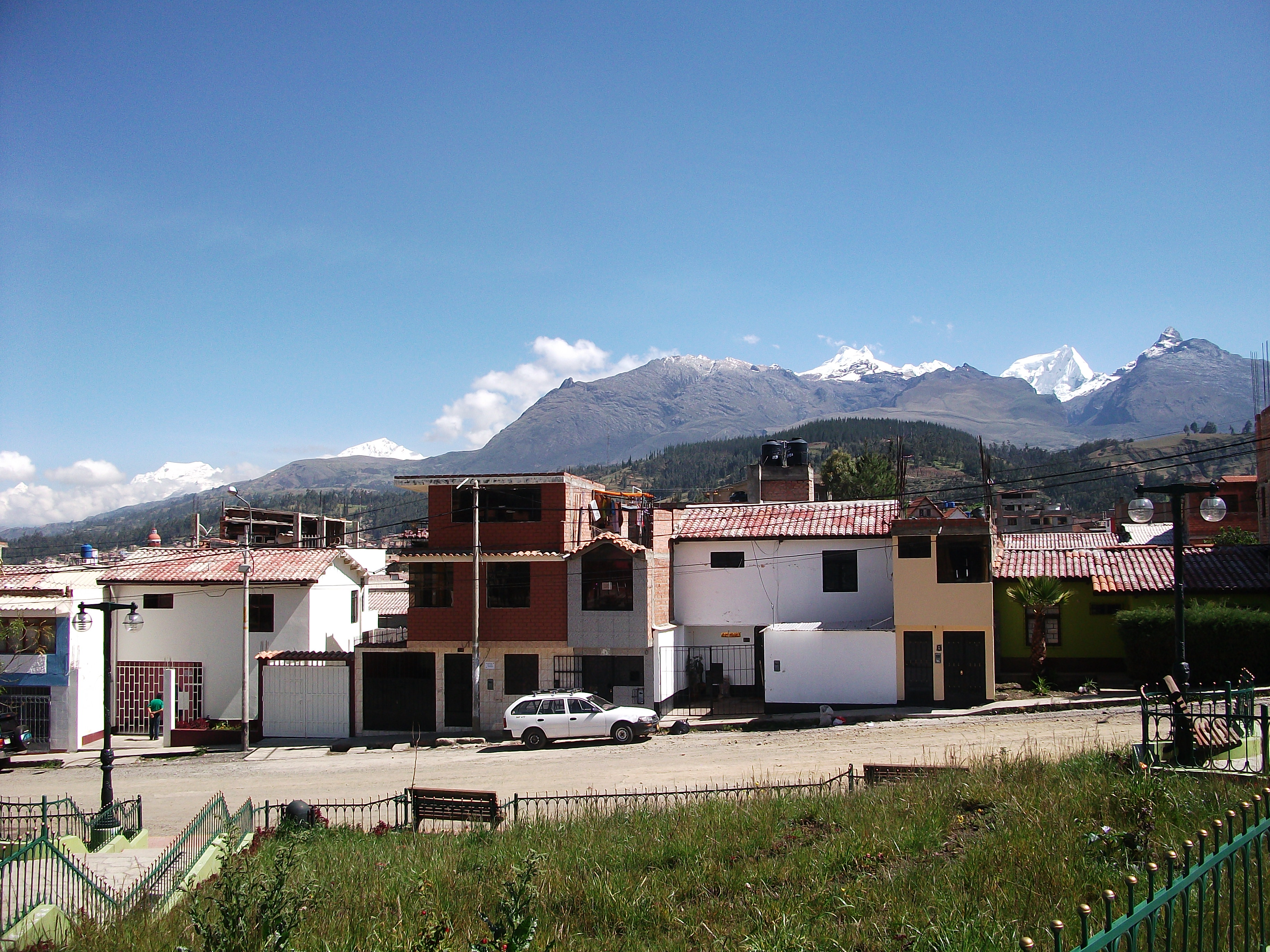
Vallunaraju, Ocshapalca, Ranrapalca and Rima Rima as seen from Huaraz.

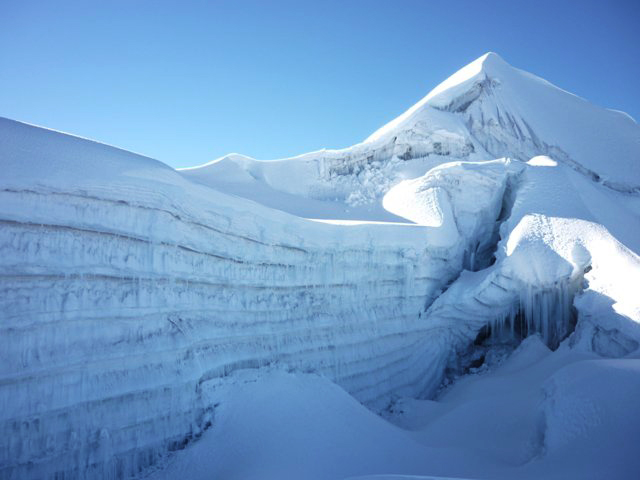
Vallunaraju

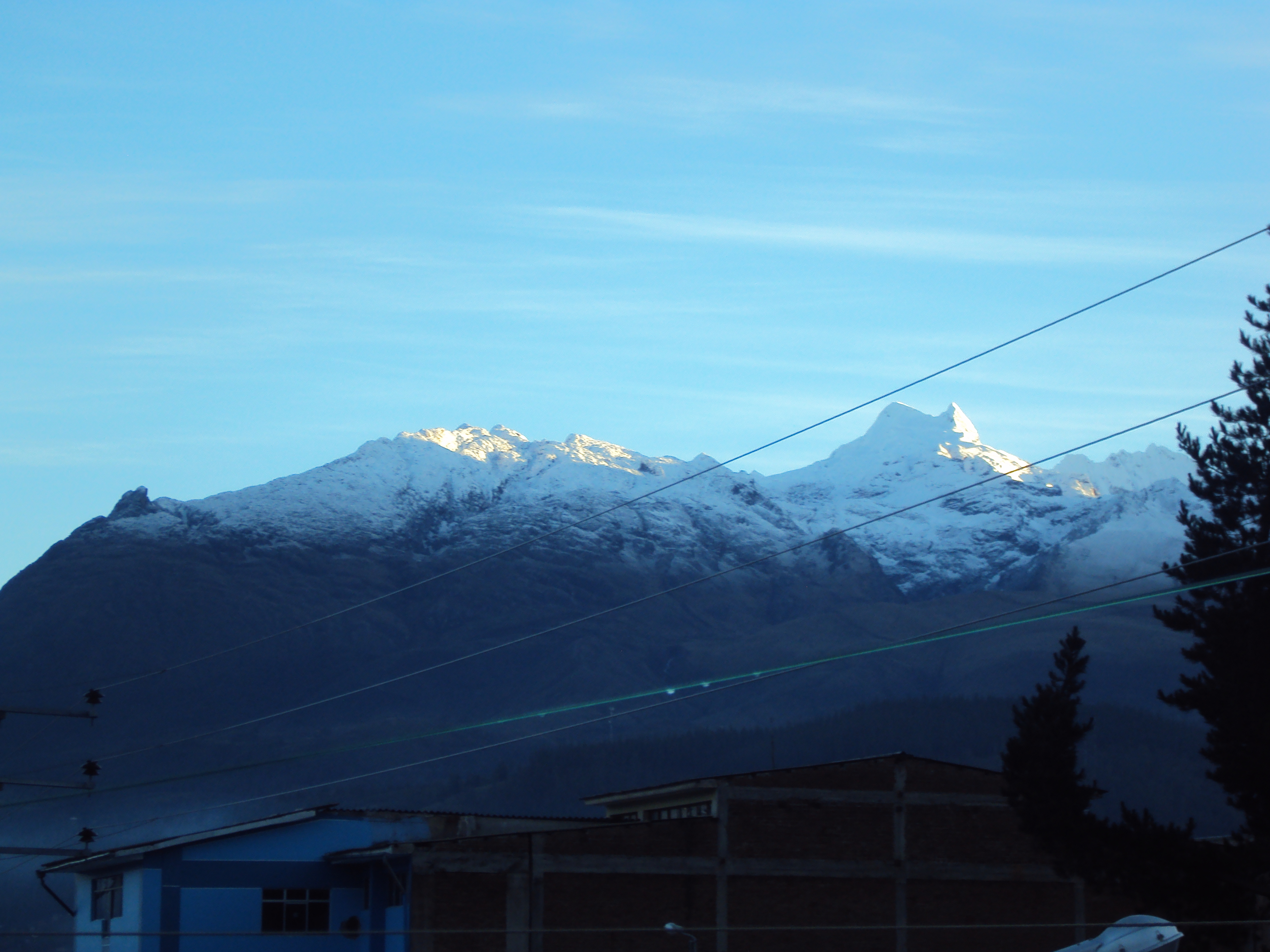
Vallunaraju (on the right) as seen from Huaraz
