= Huaraz =

Huaraz San Sebastián de Huaraz
- City
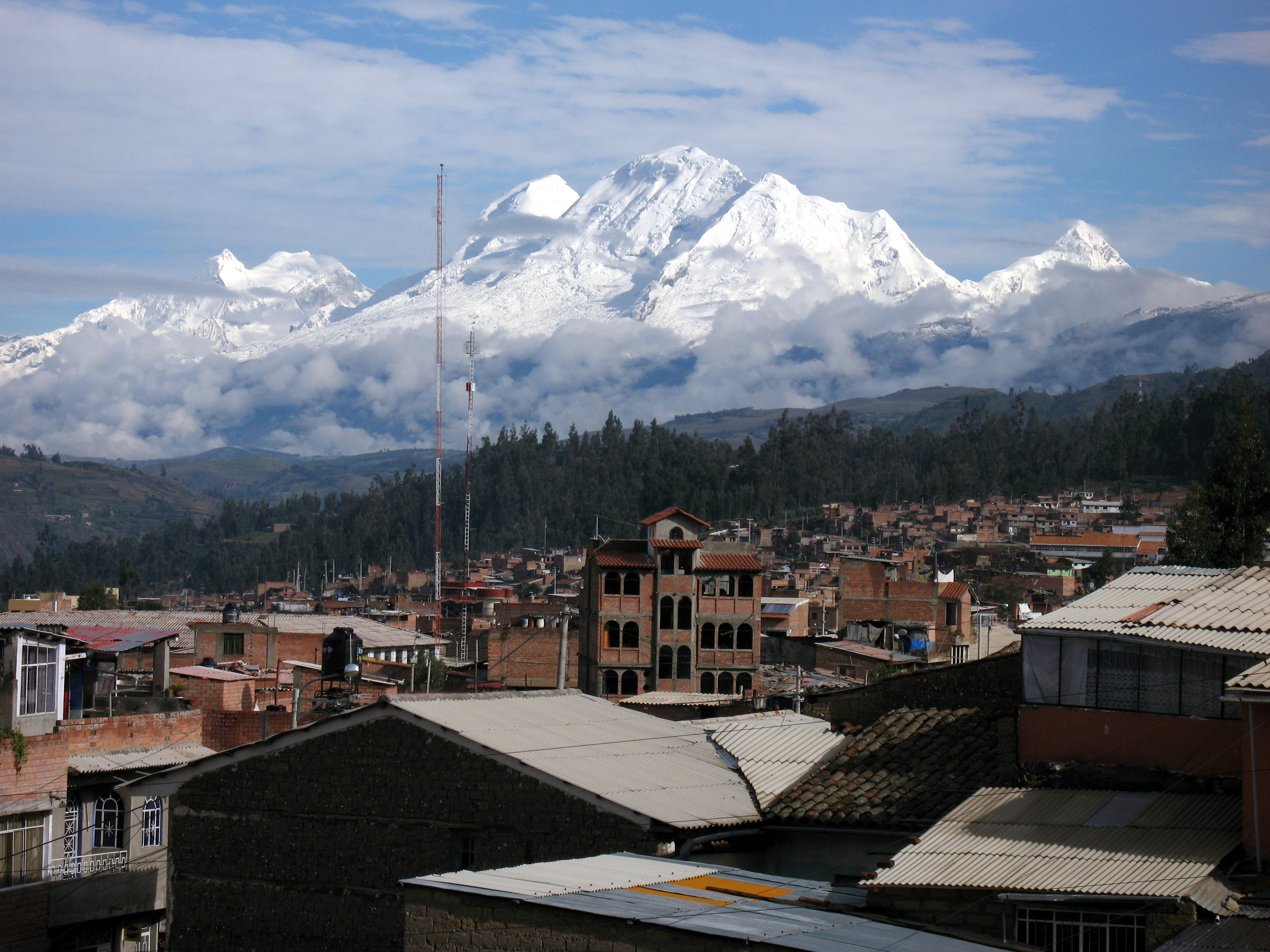
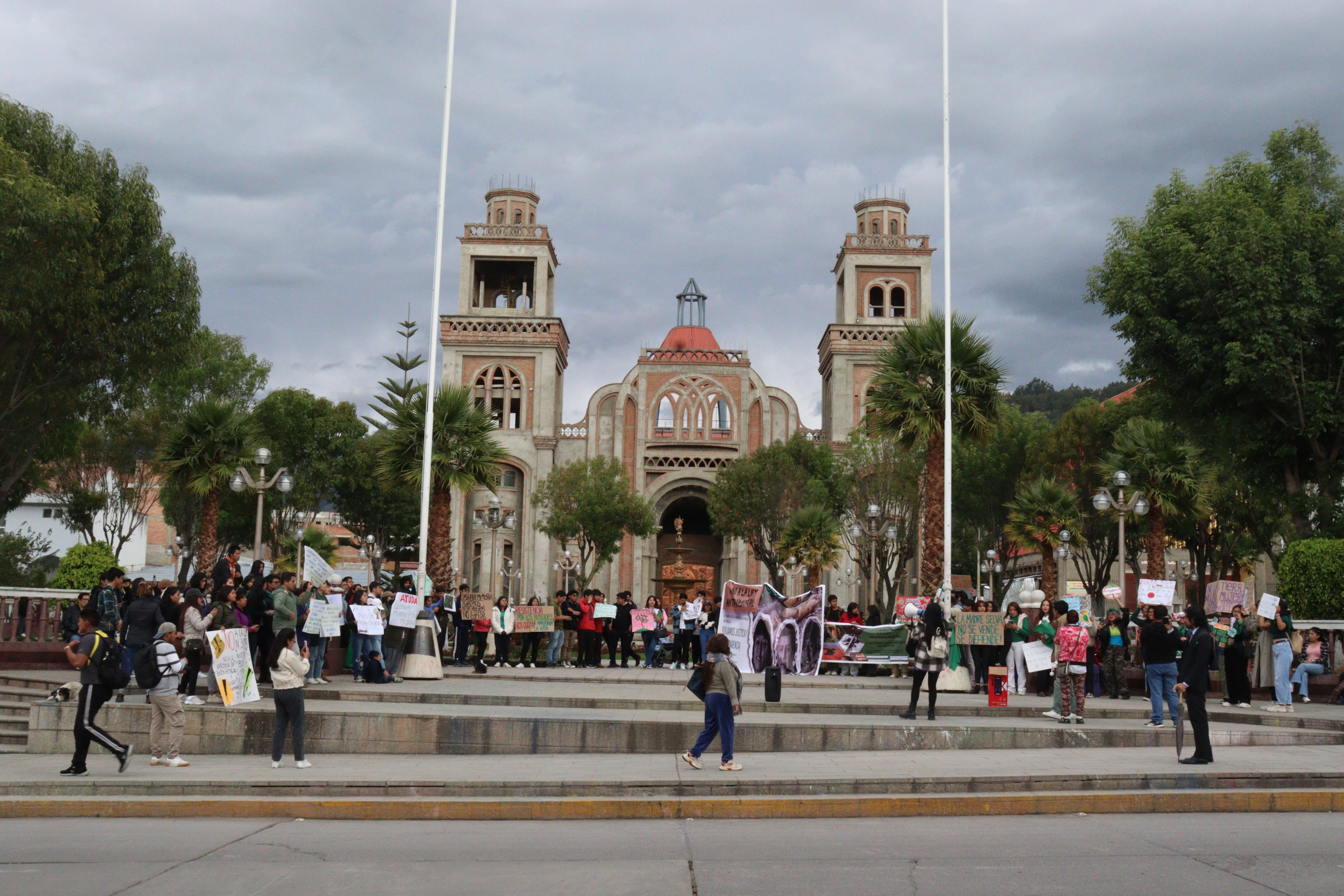
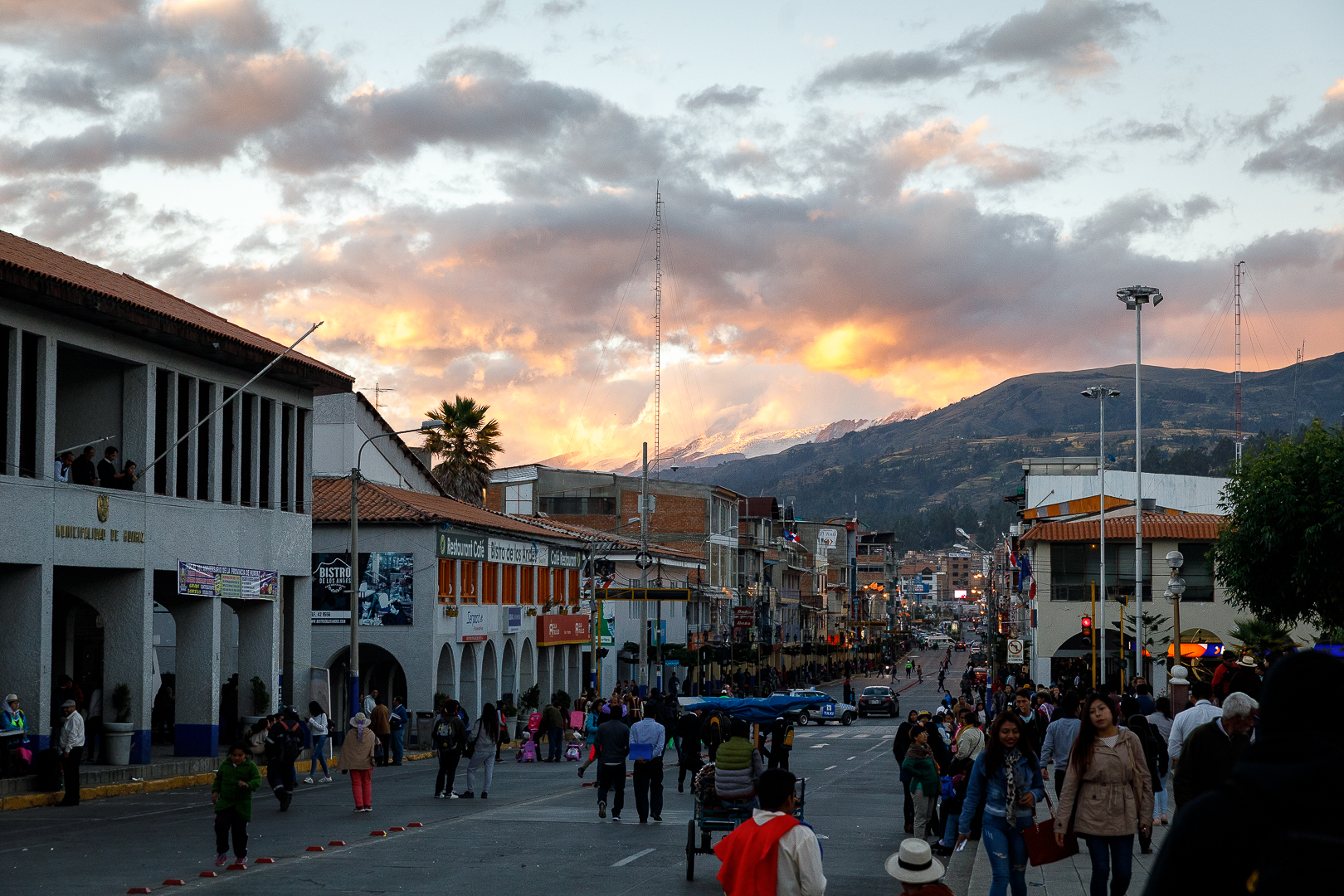
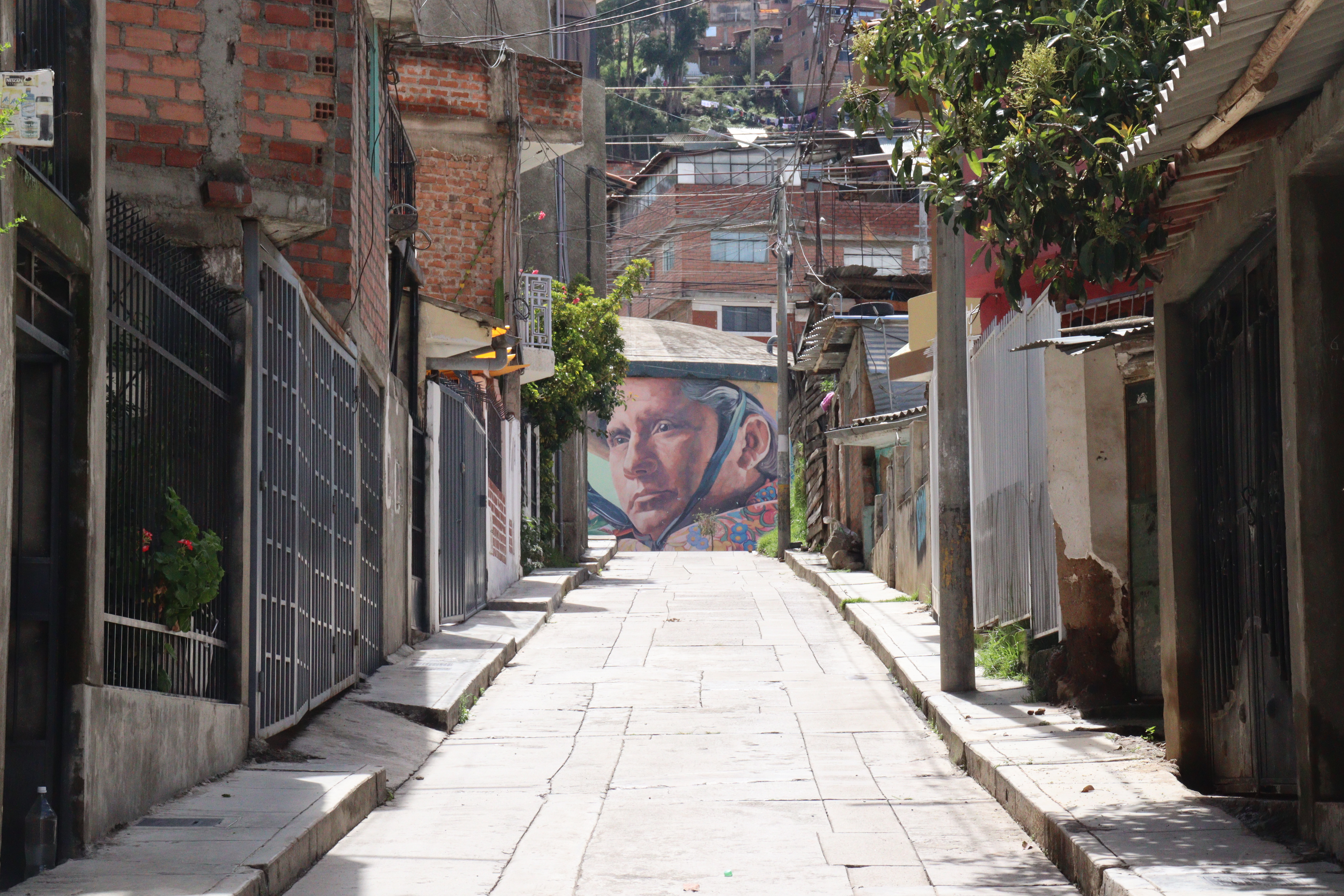
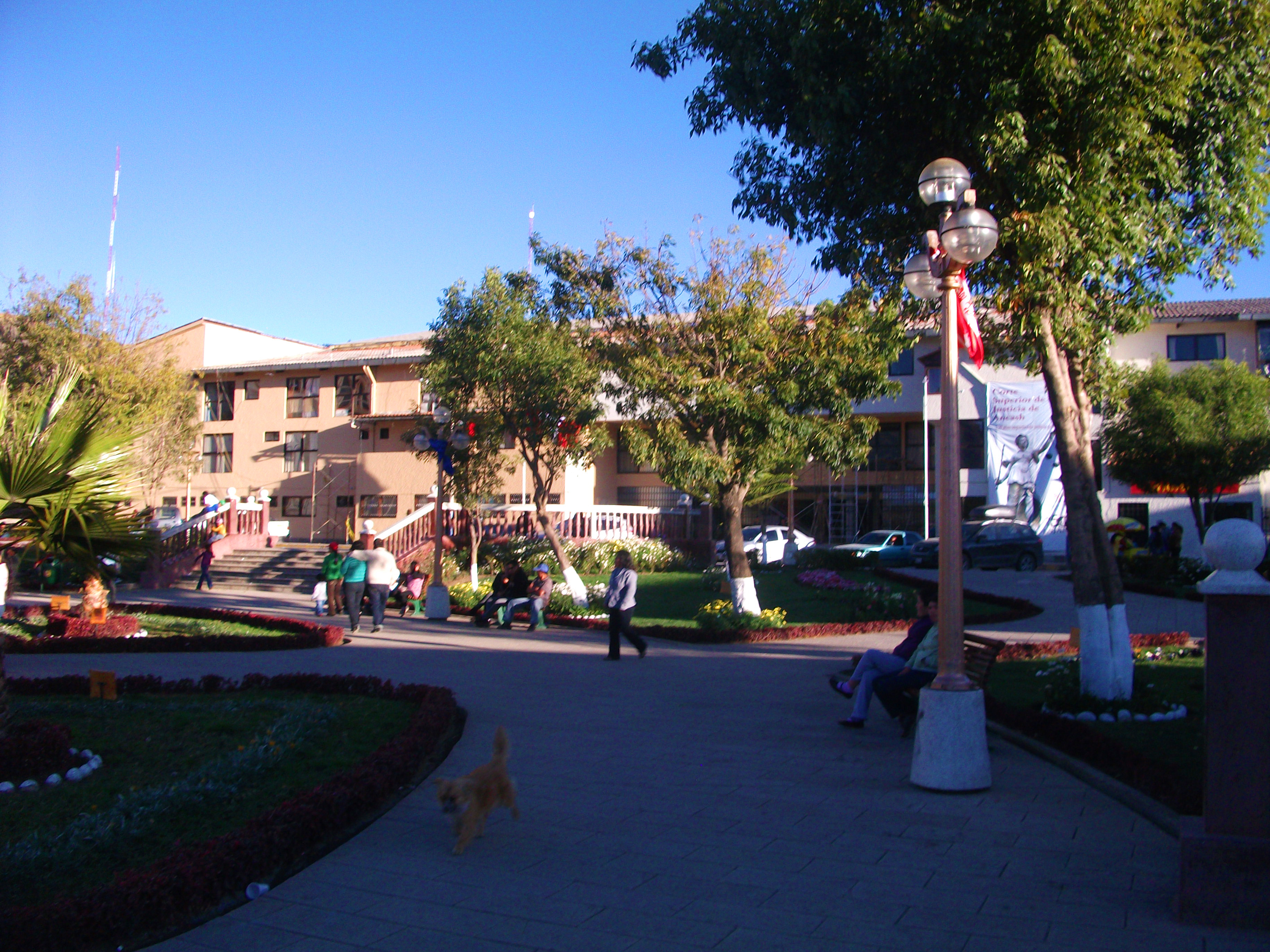
- Top: White mountain range, Second left: Cathedral and Plaza de Armas Second right: Sunset Third left: Murals in Independencia district Third right: Justice palace

- Flag Coat of arms
- Motto(s): The noble and generous City, Capital of International Friendship, Natural Paradise of the World
- Location within Peru
- Coordinates: 9°32′S 77°32′W
- Country: Peru
- Region: Ancash
- Province: Huaraz
- Founded: 20 January 1574

Government
  - Type: Democracy
  - Mayor: Eliseo Rori Mautino Ángeles (2019–2022)

Area
  - Total: 370.03 km^{2} (142.87 sq mi)
- Elevation: 3,052 m (10,013 ft)

Population (2017 census)
  - Total: 118,836
  - Estimate (2015): 127,041
  - Density: 321.15/km^{2} (831.78/sq mi)
- Time zone: UTC-5 (PET)
  - Summer (DST): UTC-5 (PET)
- Area code: 43
- Website: www.munihuaraz.gob.pe

Huaraz ([waˈɾas]) (from Quechua: Waraq or Warash, "dawn"), formerly designated as San Sebastián de Huaraz, is a city in Peru. It is the capital of the Ancash Region (State of Ancash) and the seat of government of Huaraz Province. The urban area's population is distributed over the districts of Huaraz and Independencia. The city is located in the middle of the Callejon de Huaylas valley and on the right side of the Santa river. The city has an elevation of approximately 3050 meters above sea level. The built-up area covers 8 square kilometers and has a population of 120,000 inhabitants, making it the second largest city in the central Peruvian Andes after the city of Huancayo. It is the 22nd largest city in Peru. Huaraz is the seat of the province's Roman Catholic Bishop and the site of the cathedral.

Huaraz is the main financial and trade center of the Callejón de Huaylas and the main tourist destination of Ancash region. Moreover, it is one of the biggest towns in the Peruvian Andes. Huaraz is the main destinations for winter sports and adventure. Many visitors from around the world come to the city for practicing sports as climbing, hiking, mountain biking and snowboarding, and also to visit the glaciers and mountains of the Cordillera Blanca, mainly Mount Huascarán, which is considered the tallest mountain in the tropics, all of them located in Huascarán National Park which UNESCO declared a nature world heritage site in 1985.

The city was founded before the Inca Empire when humans settled around the valley of the Santa River and Qillqay. Its Spanish occupation occurred in 1574 as a Spanish-indigenous reducción. During the wars for the independence of Peru, the whole city supported the Liberating Army with food and guns, earning the city the title of "Noble and Generous City" granted by Simón Bolívar. In 1970, 95% of the city was destroyed by an earthquake that damaged much of Ancash Region. 25,000 people died. The city received much foreign assistance from many countries. For this reason the city was named a capital of International Friendship.

The main economic activities in the city are farming, commerce and tourism. Since Huaraz has tourist infrastructure supporting the Ancash Highlands, the city is the main point of arrival for practitioners of adventure sports and mountaineering. Along with the snowy peaks of the Cordillera Blanca, one can visit archaeological sites like Chavín de Huantar and the eastern highlands of Ancash, known as Conchucos.

== Etymology ==
The name of the city comes from the Quechua word "Waraq", which means "sunrise". The pre-Hispanic inhabitants of the area had a god called "Waraq quyllur", which means "morning star" or the planet Venus, because it is the star that is seen at sunrise.

== History ==
=== Pre-Columbian era ===
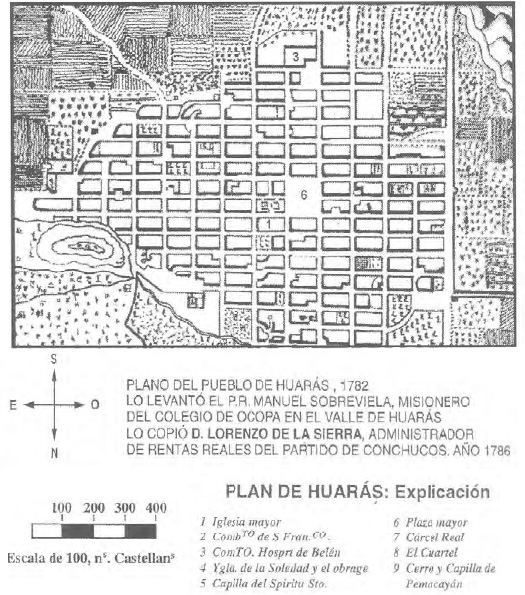
Map of Huaraz from 1782, indicating the location of the Pumacayan shrine

Human presence in the area dates back to around 10,000 B.C., when the inhabitants were hunters and gatherers. Evidence of this is found in the Guitarreros cave across from the town of Mancos. Over time, the area underwent significant changes with the development of agriculture in the zone of Vicuas and Villaqui.

During the Early Horizon epoch, the Chavín culture influenced the region and it has been proposed by that the ceremonial center located at Pumacayan hill had its beginnings during this period. During the Early Intermediate period, the Recuay culture emerged in the area. Following this, in the Middle Horizon, the area of Huaraz was conquered by the Wari culture, this empire built the archaeological rests of Wilcahuain and Waullac.

During the Late Intermediate Period, Huaraz was an important town in the kingdom of Huaylas or Wayllas prior to Inca occupation in the Late Horizon. During the reign of the ninth Inca ruler Pachacuti, the military leaders Capac Yupanqui and Tupac Inca Yupanqui waged a conquest war against the Huaylas and their allied neighbors as part of the Inca expansion efforts in the Chinchaysuyo. After the war, the kingdom was reconstituted a Inca hunu, divided into the two traditional moieties of hanan and hurin, with hurin being subordinate to hanan. Huaraz was the seat of the Hurin or Lower Huaylas moiety.

Following its incorporation into the Inca Empire, the Incas soon made architectural interventions at Pumacayan, which held the principal wak'a of the Huaylas people. This might explain why Pedro Cieza de León records two local versions about the origin of Pumacayan: one tracing it as a monument or fortress of the Inca to commemorate winning a “certain battle” and the other stating that it dates to far ancient times. Cieza refers to Pumacayan as a "large fortress" because it featured imposing walls that enclosed the buildings and considered it to be one of the most impressive complexes in Peru. However, almost all the constructions within Pumacayan were eventually dismantled for building materials in later centuries. Excavations conducted in 2003 suggest the administrative nature of Pumacayan during the time of the Incas.

As part of the integration efforts of the Tawantinsuyo, the Incas implemented a policy of marriages between Inca and Huaylas nobles. The daughters of the two kings of the Huaylas diarchy were given as secondary wives to the heir of the Emperor Tupac Inca Yupanqui, Huayna Capac. The ruler of Hurin Huaylas, Huacachillar Apo, gave his daughter, Añas Colque, who was taken to be educated as an Inca noble in Cusco. In her old age, Añas Colque ruled the Hurin Huaylas. From the marriage between the Emperor Huayna Capac and Añas Colque was born the influential aristocrat Paullo Inca, Paullo later collaborated with the Spanish and served as Sapa Inca during the early years following the Spanish conquest.

In 1533, while stationed in Cajamarca, Francisco Pizarro sent his brother, Hernando Pizarro, along with a small expeditionary party, to Pachacamac and back to collect part of Atahualpa's ransom, sponsored by the captive Inca himself. During the journey, Hernando provided the first description of the precolonial city of Huaraz, and he also noted the fertile green soil of the Callejón de Huaylas, along with its significant livestock in the highlands and the prosperous towns and villages.

"The next day, the captain [Hernando Pizarro] departed from that town; and through the valley, he went to dine in a large town called Guarax [Warash], with the Lord of Pumacapllai, where he and his Indians were well provided with food and people to carry the loads. This town is situated on a plain, with a river running alongside it."

=== Colonial era ===
Francisco Pizarro, known as the Spanish conquistador of Peru, in 1538 granted the right to collect taxes in the area within what is now the province of Huaraz to his subordinate Sebastián de Torres. Alonso de Santoyo founded on 20 January 1574 a Hispanic Indigenous reduction (Reducción Hispano Indígena) with the name of Pampa Huarás de San Sebastián, with 14 quarters. Later its political creation, dated on 12 February 1821, while General José de San Martín was staying in Huaura (city north from Lima) founded 4 Departments, including Huaylas as one of them, with its capital, the city of Caraz. Finally on 1857, it was split in two, giving birth to the new young province of Huaraz with its capital, the nowadays, City of Huaraz.

From the beginning the Spaniards began exploiting the mineral wealth of the region. Several deposits of metal ores were discovered: silver, lead, and tin, among others. Availability of these metals for mining and smelting locally was the primary attraction of the Callejón area to Spain. Hundreds of the native Quechua-speakers by the 1570s were laboring in the mines.

As in other areas of Spanish settlement in the Andean countries most agricultural works such as native irrigation canals and terraces were appropriated or destroyed by the colonial administrators. The Spaniards did not call their tactics slavery, though in fact the effects were the same. Disappearances and unexplained deaths were common for resistors. The entire population of some villages was forcibly marched long distances and resettled. To identify those who tried to return to their prior homes, the native peoples were required to wear distinctive clothing identifiable by areas or provinces. The Spanish patron or hacendado often chose for those people under his control a costume copied from his home region in Spain. These costumes are now a source of regional and national pride among many Andeans who identify with their native ancestry.

=== Contemporary times ===
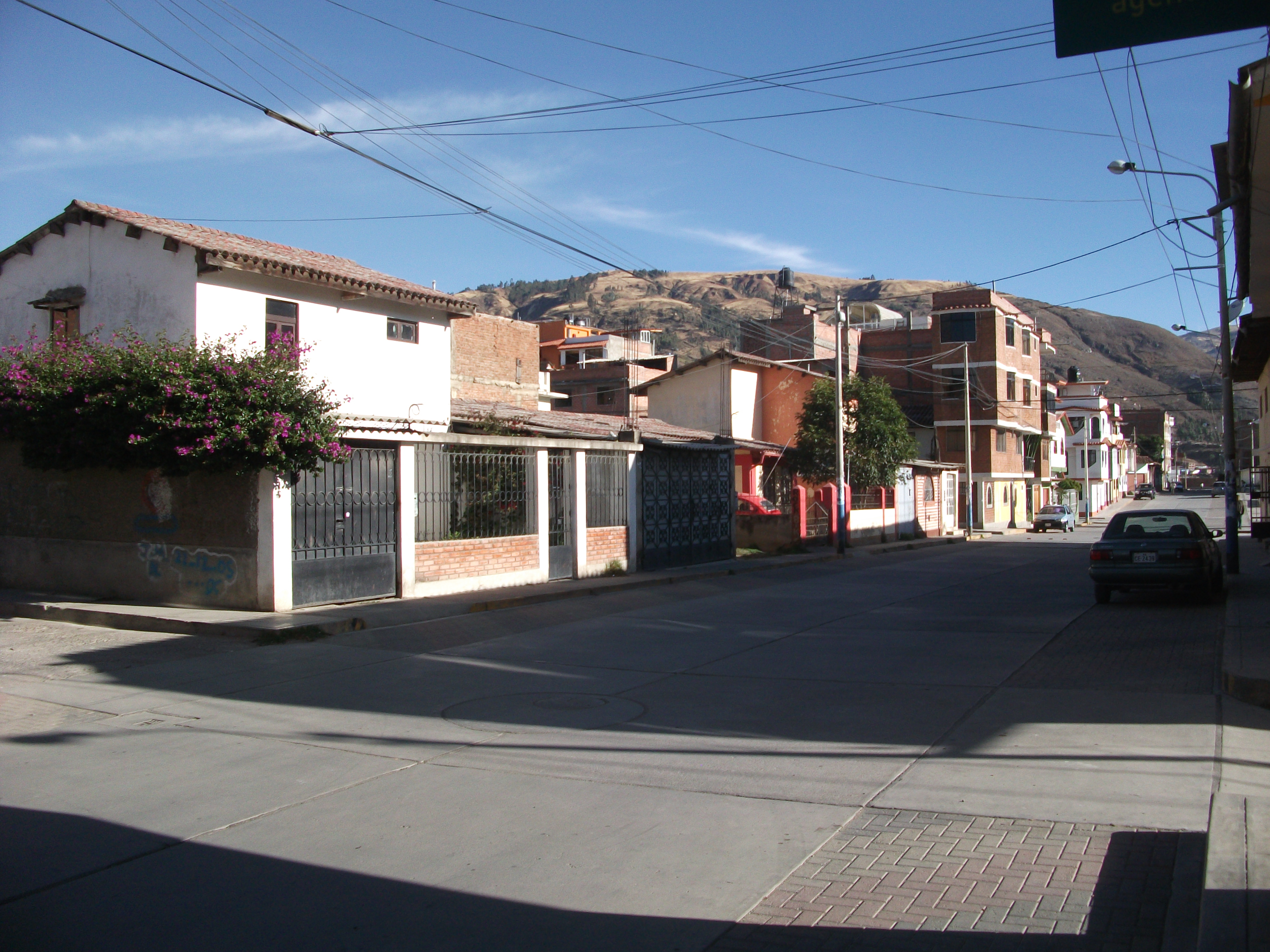
Modern neighbourhoods were built after 1970s earthquake

Much of the north side and a large part of the center of the city was destroyed in 1941 by floodwaters and avalanche debris because of a burst reservoir from Lake Palcacocha that was the city's municipal water supply. The reservoir dam was about 6 km (3.7 mi) east of the town and more than 200 meters elevation above it. The dam failed because of sudden overflow pressure from an avalanche of glacier ice probably caused by a localized tremor (earthquake). Within a few minutes the stream bed was filled with an avalanche of water, mud, boulders, and associated debris whose crest by the time it reached the city may have exceeded 15 meters height above the stream bed. In as few as four minutes after the dam burst the avalanche obliterated and covered the city's most modern suburb and destroyed most of the north half of the city. 4,000 died.

After the 1941 disaster the old reservoir dam was repaired but not replaced. Doubts about the safety of the dam were largely responsible for abandonment of that area for redevelopment. The creek valley upstream from the city in the mid-1960s exhibited scarred inner banks several meters higher than the normal water level. The scarring caused by the avalanche was increasingly higher above the stream bed on the creek valley walls nearer the reservoir. The scoured appearance of the creek valley indicated the mass and power of the avalanche gaining momentum as it crashed down the narrow valley, accumulating debris as it descended.

By 1965 fewer than a half dozen buildings had been rebuilt in the creek valley adjacent north of the city. The valley was still filled by as many as three meters of soil and debris deposited by the 1941 avalanche. Giant boulders lay about, some protruding as many as four meters above the 1965 creek bed level. Many boulders from the 1941 avalanche were strewn down to the confluence of the creek with the Santa River. Huaraz area residents who remembered the disaster of 1941 said in 1965 that the river itself was diverted by avalanche debris for some days until eroded away and carried downstream (northward), and there were boulders on the west bank that had come with the avalanche.

On 31 May 1970 the same reservoir dam burst during the Ancash earthquake, which had a moment magnitude of 7.9 and a maximum Mercalli intensity of VIII (Severe). Down the creek valley, again came an avalanche, eerily similar to that of 1941. In the prior four years or so, the suburb had begun to again be redeveloped: numerous residences were built atop the 1941 avalanche deposit within the at-risk creek valley. Within its duration of 45 seconds, virtually every structure of consequence in the city's center was destroyed. A few minutes later, the north half of the city, particularly in the creek valley, was obliterated by an avalanche of icy mud carrying boulders and other debris.

As many as 20,000 people were killed within the city; there were reported only 91 survivors within the city itself. The historic structures along the narrow streets, particularly the big adobe casonas (large houses) roofed with ceramic tiles, were reduced to rubble. The main square was evident by the dearth of rubble; the city was rebuilt around it. Where once stood the old casonas and their high-walled compounds now there are smaller buildings. The narrow streets had been deathtraps during the quake; the post-1970 city design has wider, more modern streets.

== Geography ==
=== Location ===
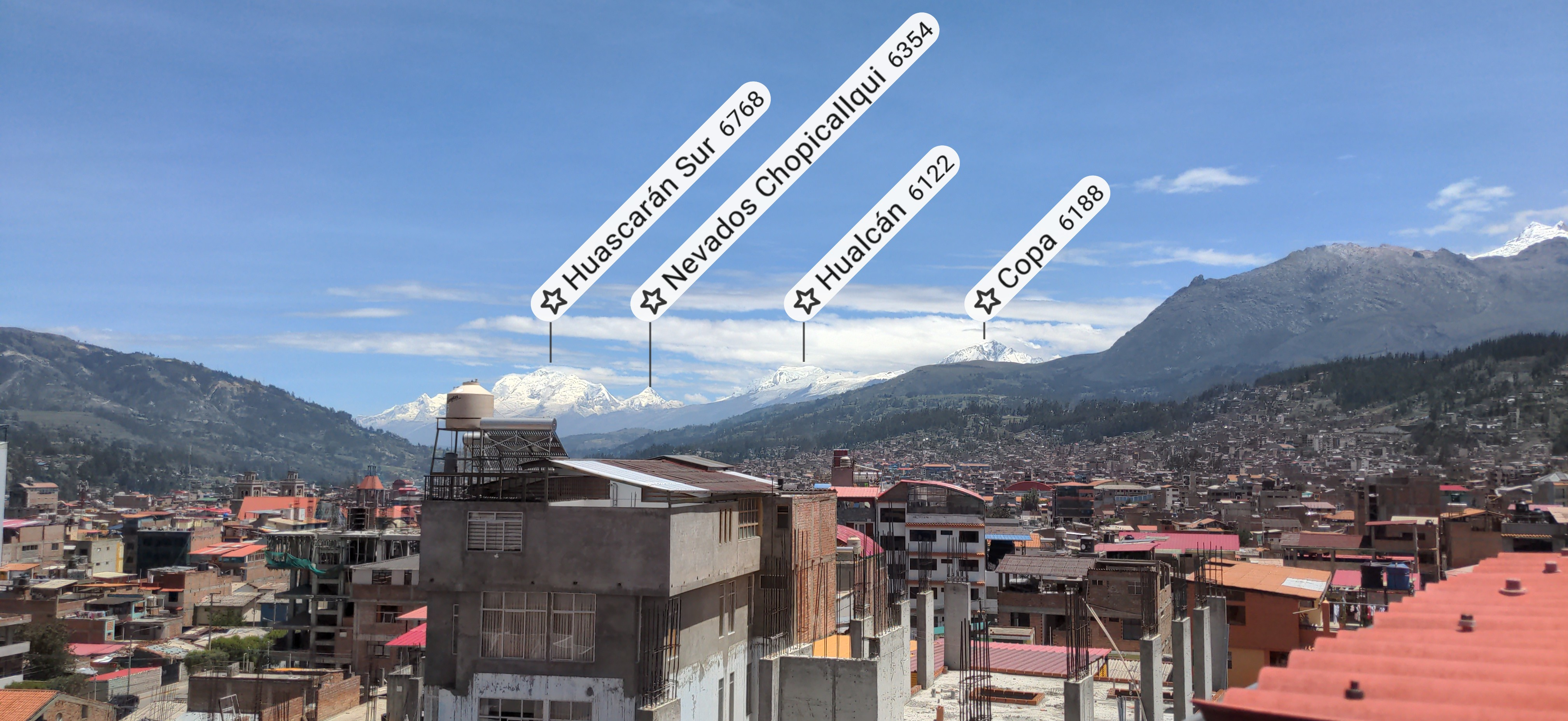
View from a rooftop in Huaraz to the north, showing the snowy peaks of the Cordillera Blanca

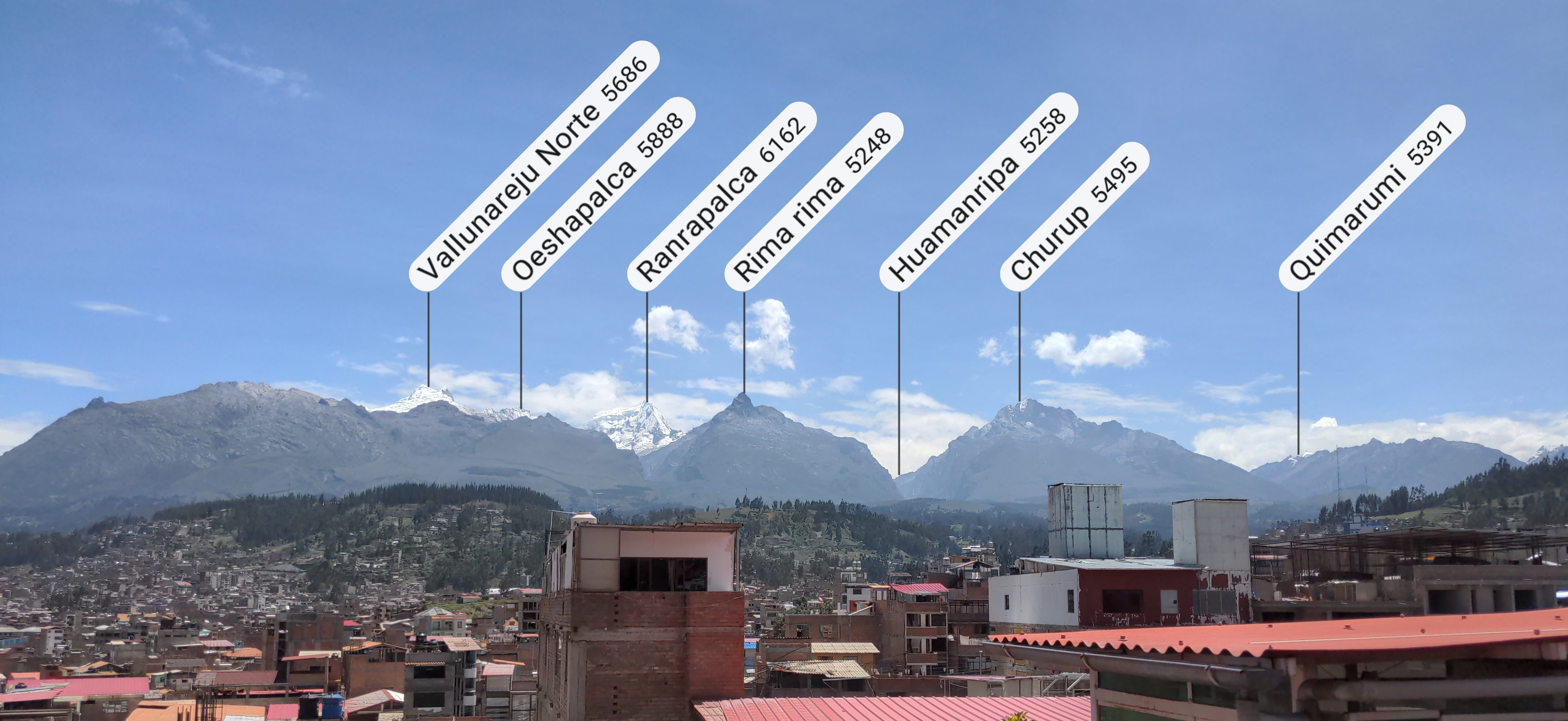
View to the north-east over Huaraz to the peaks of the Cordillera Blanca

Huaraz is in north-central Peru, about 420 km north of Lima, and at an altitude of 3,052 metres (10,013 ft). It is the largest population center in the agriculturally important Callejón de Huaylas valley. The Callejón (in Spanish roughly meaning large valley or corridor) is a north–south valley bounded on the east by the Cordillera Blanca (permanent white snowcaps and glaciers) and on the west by the Cordillera Negra (no permanent snowcapped peaks or glaciers, hence black). The Cordillera Blanca includes Huascarán, the highest mountain in Peru at 6,768 metres (22,205 ft) and the third highest in the Western Hemisphere. Huascarán and the adjacent peak Huandoy in fair weather are clearly visible from Huaraz.

The Santa River flows north through Huaraz. It is not commercially navigable but has always furnished the city with good water. The river is a rocky-bottom narrow stream of glacier-fed cold water that flows generally west of center in the Callejón, running north to the valley's north end. There it rushes downward through the narrow Cañón del Pato (Duck Canyon), turns westward at the town of Huallanca, and continues to the coast where it enters the Pacific Ocean south of the city of Chimbote. The Santa River is the traditional western boundary of Huaraz, although part of the city's population has lived on the west bank there for as long as two centuries.

The nominal north boundary of Huaraz is along a westward flowing creek that empties into the Santa River. The creek, whose watershed is the westward facing nearby foothills and slopes of the Cordillera Blanca, has twice since 1940 been the channel of devastating earthquake-precipitated floods (see below).

The most recent devastating flood and avalanche along this creek bed was a result of the 1970 earthquake. The avalanche of 1941 had filled the creek valley with debris, covering the new suburb on the city's north edge. The 1970 avalanche and floodwaters down this creek valley destroyed the city's north-side subdivision, which had been partially rebuilt by the late 1960s. The 1970 avalanche debris also created a temporary natural dam across the Santa River, which caused flooding throughout much of the city. The quake damaged almost all the city's major buildings. Over the next few days the city was devastated by flooding from both the creek and the river and by water-borne earthquake debris.

=== Orography ===
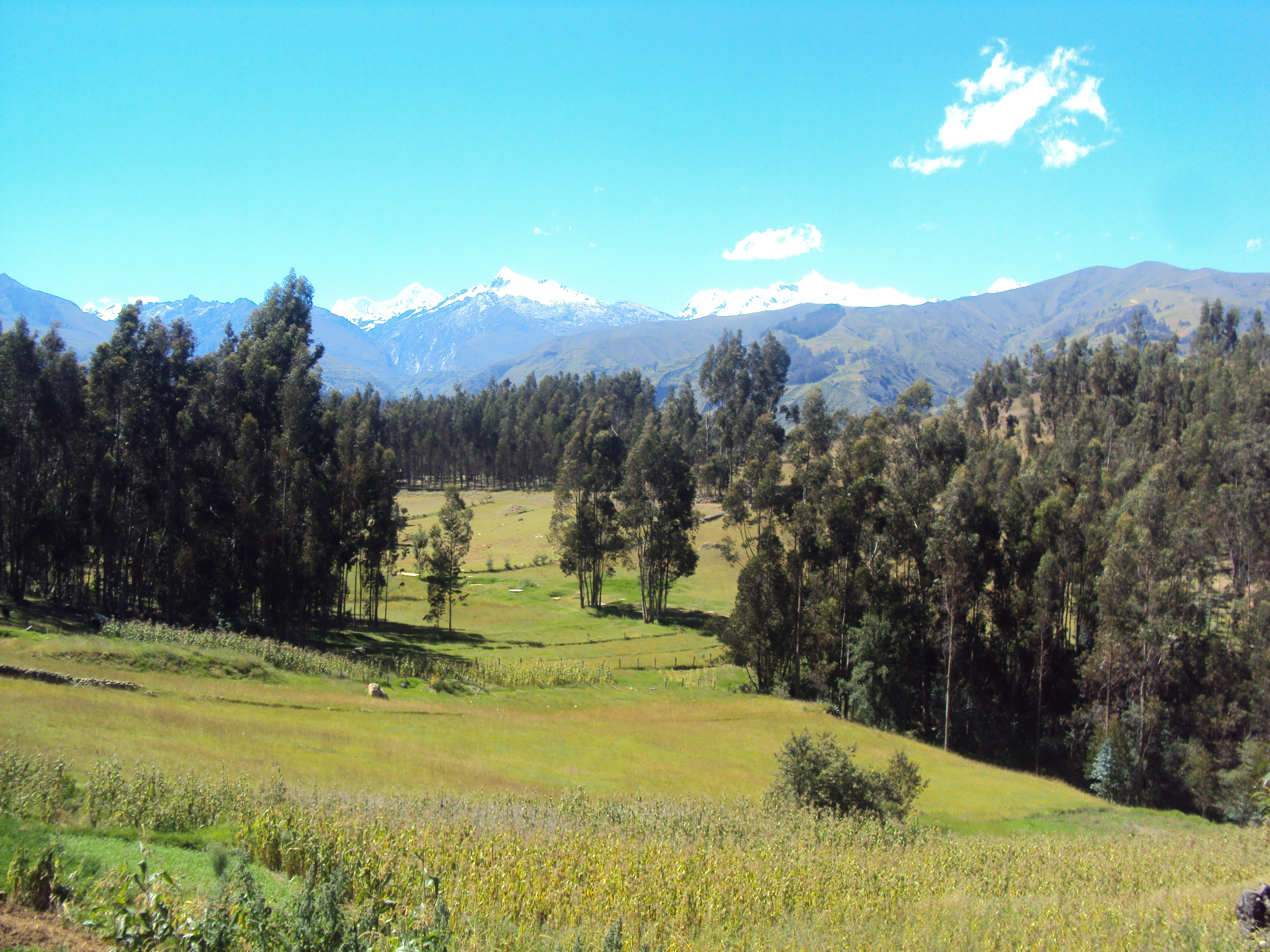
Huaraz is surrounded by prairies and forests in the middle of the valley.

The urban area of Huaraz is located at the Santa River basin. The environment of the city is characteristic of an Andean valley. Huaraz is located in the Callejón de Huaylas valley, surrounded by the Cordillera Blanca and Cordillera Negra as its system mountains. The main river is the Santa, which crosses the city from south to north, and also the Qillqay river that crosses the urban area from east to west, flowing to the Santa river.

The territory surrounding Huaraz is heterogeneous, mountainous and rough; because of that its slopes have gradients varying between 2% and 25% in the central zone and 15% and 45% in the outskirts.

=== Layout ===
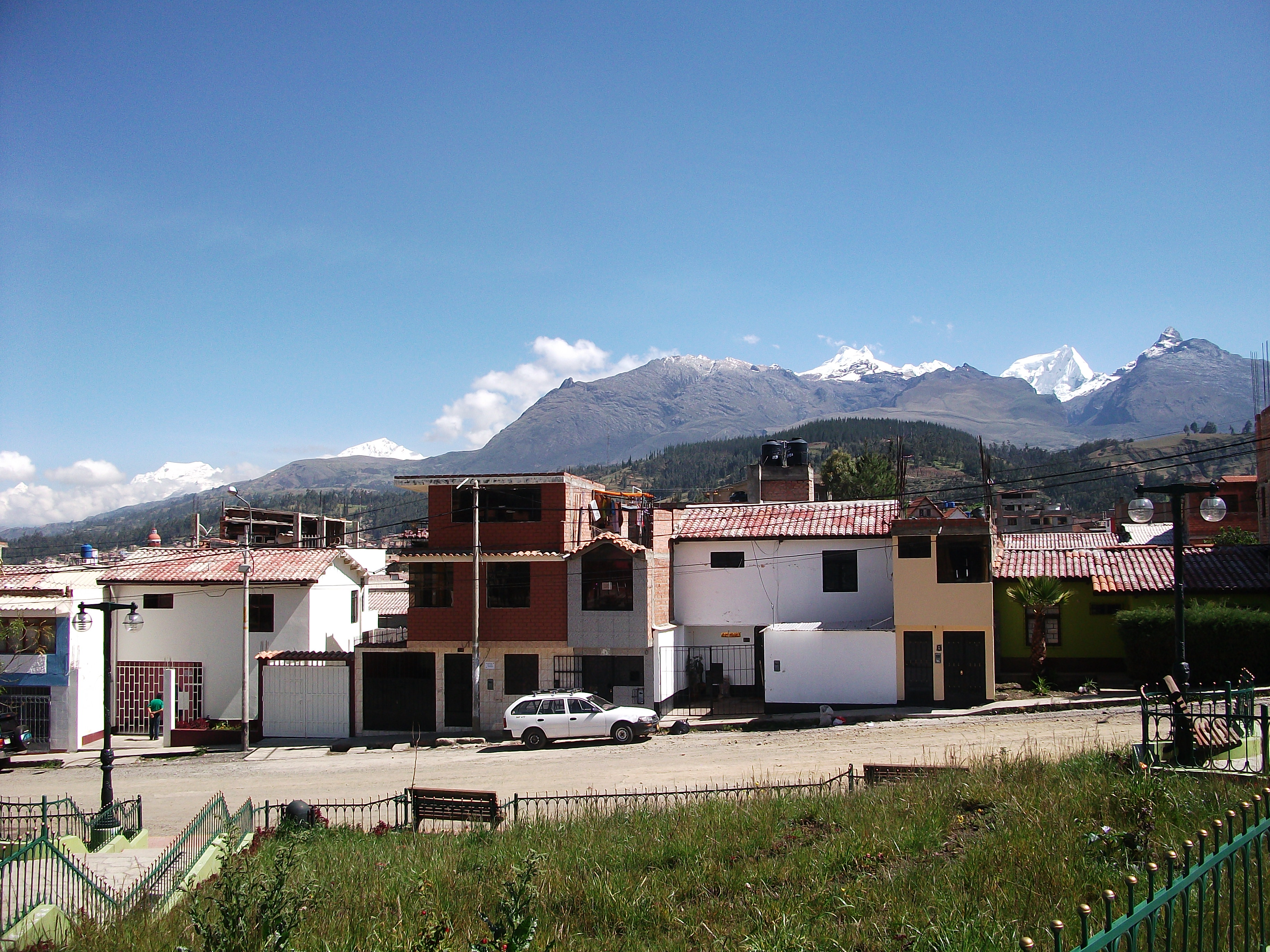
La Soledad neighbourhood in the central district

Huaraz in its beginning had an architecture composed of circular houses, after that, they were demolished in order to build square houses and narrow streets on a grid plan. The main square used to be wide and was signed at downtown, it was surrounded by the Big Cathedral, the city hall, the jail, the governor in colonial times established his residence in Huaraz, for that reason the city was elevated to the category of region capital.

Of the quiet, silent, old city with big mansions made of mud and gabled-roofs with narrow streets, only José Olaya street remains. It was declared a national heritage site, because the 1970s earthquake destroyed 95% of the city and all the traditional and colonial architecture disappeared, except Olaya Street, robbing the city of its traditional identity.

The grid plan of Huaraz has changed and disappeared the original composition of four neighbourhoods, as La Soledad (downtown), Belén, Huarupampa and San Francisco.

For its rebuilding after the earthquake, the government had to demolish the damaged houses. After that, the city was planned with a modern physiognomy like wide streets and avenues with central gardens. Colonial architecture doesn't exist, it was modernized in its own Andean style of gabled roofs. The city has a modern and planned design, made for Gunther-Seminario Company. Despite that the city grows in a disorganized way. On the other hand, the city had a great commercial movement, and high-quality tourist services. Nevertheless, the rapid urbanization resulted in irregular neighbourhoods.

The city grew in a longitudinal way from north to south, Only in central downtown there are buildings with more than 3 or 4 floors. Many of the buildings were modified, in order to rent apartments and lofts.

=== Neighborhoods ===
The metropolitan area is composed of two districts, Huaraz and Independencia. These are also divided into neighborhoods and settlements, and they also are divided in two or more parts. the majority of neighborhoods are located in Huaraz District, especially the traditional areas like La Soledad, Belén, Huarupampa and San Francisco, that are surrounding the downtown, and its residents are in 60% the traditional citizens of Huaraz. This neighbourhoods, are in great part from middle class. On the other hand, surrounding these areas, there are other settlements that have developed without planning. In the District of Independencia there are other middle- and upper-class neighborhoods. Centenario is the most extensive area in the city. At this area many rural migrants has established developing informal neighbourhoods. The tendency of city's growing is on the north-east part of the city. In north direction has developed areas of recent creation, especially for people searching an ecological area for establish.

=== Climate ===
Huaraz has a warm moderated weather of tropical mountain. It is sunny and dry during the morning and cold past the evening, with temperatures between 11 and 17 °C and maximum temperatures that can exceed 21 °C. During the rainy season, from December to March, rainfall can be between 500 mm and 1000 mm. The dry season, spanning from April to November, is also known as "Andean summer".

Climate data for Huaraz (Santiago Antunez De Mayolo), elevation 3,079 m (10,102 ft), (1991–2020)
Month	Jan	Feb	Mar	Apr	May	Jun	Jul	Aug	Sep	Oct	Nov	Dec	Year
Mean daily maximum °C (°F)	22.2 (72.0)	21.8 (71.2)	21.5 (70.7)	22.1 (71.8)	22.7 (72.9)	23.0 (73.4)	23.4 (74.1)	24.2 (75.6)	24.3 (75.7)	23.6 (74.5)	23.0 (73.4)	22.1 (71.8)	22.8 (73.1)
Mean daily minimum °C (°F)	8.2 (46.8)	8.4 (47.1)	8.6 (47.5)	8.2 (46.8)	6.8 (44.2)	5.0 (41.0)	4.3 (39.7)	4.7 (40.5)	6.1 (43.0)	7.2 (45.0)	7.0 (44.6)	7.8 (46.0)	6.9 (44.4)
Average precipitation mm (inches)	100.7 (3.96)	124.4 (4.90)	150.9 (5.94)	94.1 (3.70)	33.5 (1.32)	3.8 (0.15)	2.5 (0.10)	2.5 (0.10)	20.0 (0.79)	66.5 (2.62)	69.9 (2.75)	133.7 (5.26)	802.5 (31.59)
Source: National Meteorology and Hydrology Service of Peru

== Demographics ==
According to the 2017 Peru Census, the Huaraz metropolitan area has a population of 118,836. After the earthquake that the city suffered in 1970, fifty percent of people in the city died. Nonetheless, the city was rebuilt and attracted internal migrants, especially from rural areas in the region. During the decade of the 1990s, the Pierina gold mine was established in the region, attracting people from other parts of the country to settle in the city.

The official language in the city is Spanish, which is spoken for the majority of Huaraz's residents. A minority of people speaks Quechua, especially in rural areas where it is more predominant.

Historical population

Year	Pop.	±%
1961	20,345	—
1972	31,382	+54.2%
1981	44,883	+43.0%
1993	66,888	+49.0%

Year	Pop.	±%
2002	93,268	+39.4%
2007	119,447	+28.1%
2011	131,377	+10.0%
2017	118,836	−9.5%

Source: INEI

== Economy ==
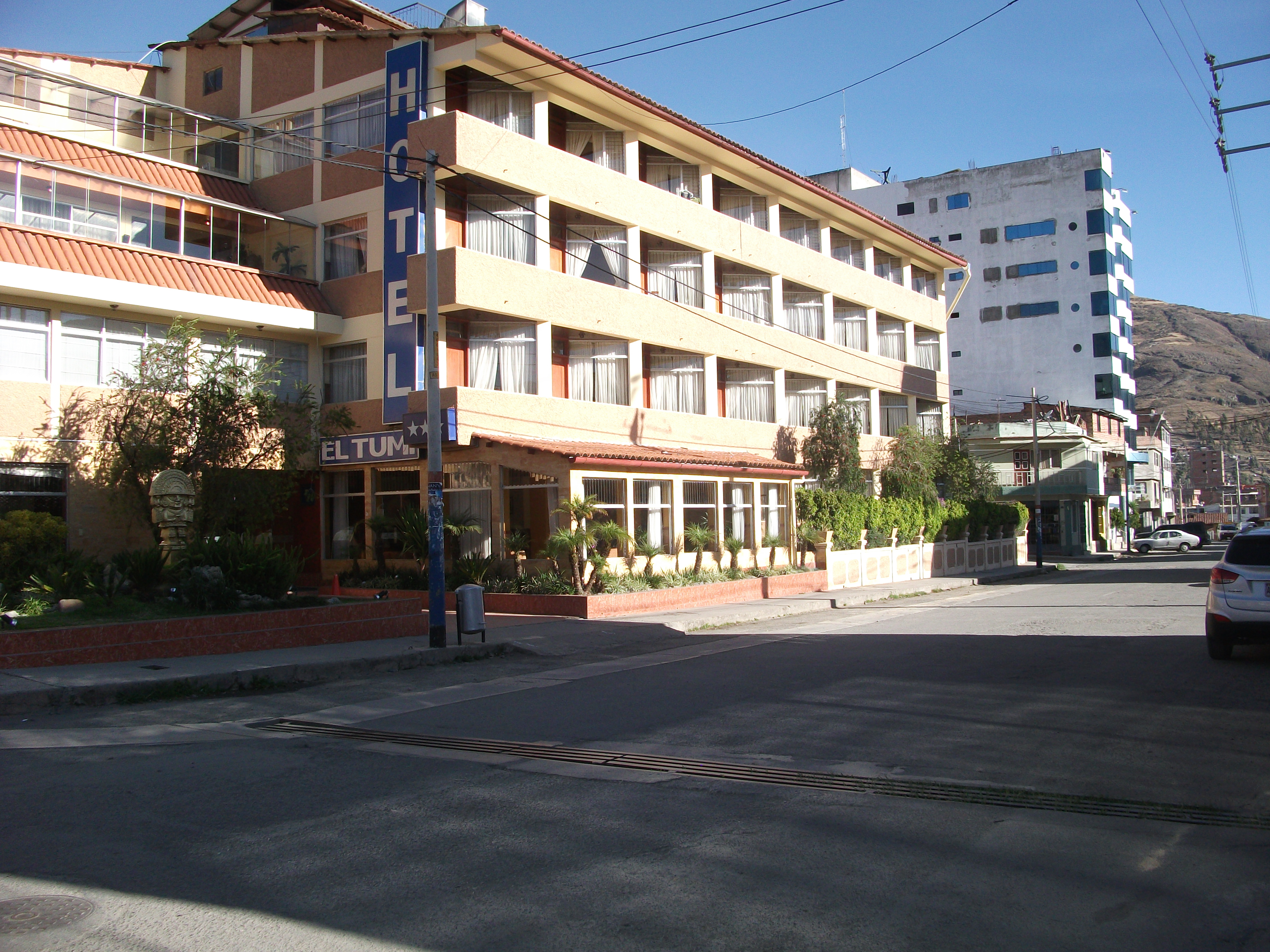
Hotels at Huaraz downtown.

Presently, mining is the main economic activity. Since the foundation of Pierina gold mine in 1996, for the Canadian company Barrick Gold Corporation. Industry is composed of medium and small companies dedicated to food industry, as the elaboration of soft drinks, beer, cheeses and milk derivates, and this activity occupies a 13% of the economically active population. Also exist companies dedicated to the building and housing industry. Those kind of companies are spread by different parts of the metropolitan area and Callejón de Huaylas basin.

Fifty percent of economical active population is dedicated to commerce and is service-oriented. Since the 1990s, have been increasing the number of small and medium companies, as a result, of the economical crisis and in order to survive the index of unemployment. Is important to notice that the laboral force of the small managements which impulse other activities as tourism and handicrafts industry. Moreover, Huaraz have ever been the center of business, commerce, and finances in the Callejón de Huaylas and the Andean part of Ancash, as if the city is the main supplier industry of farming products in the Region.

Despite tourism always was the main economic activity, for that reason Huaraz is one of the main tourist destinations of Peru, receiving every year 200,000 visitors between Peruvian and foreigners. Huaraz as main city of the region, has the majority of tourist services like good-quality hotels, restaurants, and pubs. Visitors are expected to visit the Huascarán National Park, also known as the biggest glacier in the tropics, and other historical sites as Chavín de Huantar.

== Sports and recreation ==
Soccer is one of the most played sports in the city. There are many soccer fields in the city, located in the various neighbourhoods. Basketball and volleyball are also played, especially popular among women.

Adventure sports and mountaineering are also popular in the city, especially among young people and tourists. Adventure sports include trekking, rock climbing, trail running and mountain biking. Small half day walks to Rataquenua viewpoint and Pukaventana hills are also common.

=== Sports ===
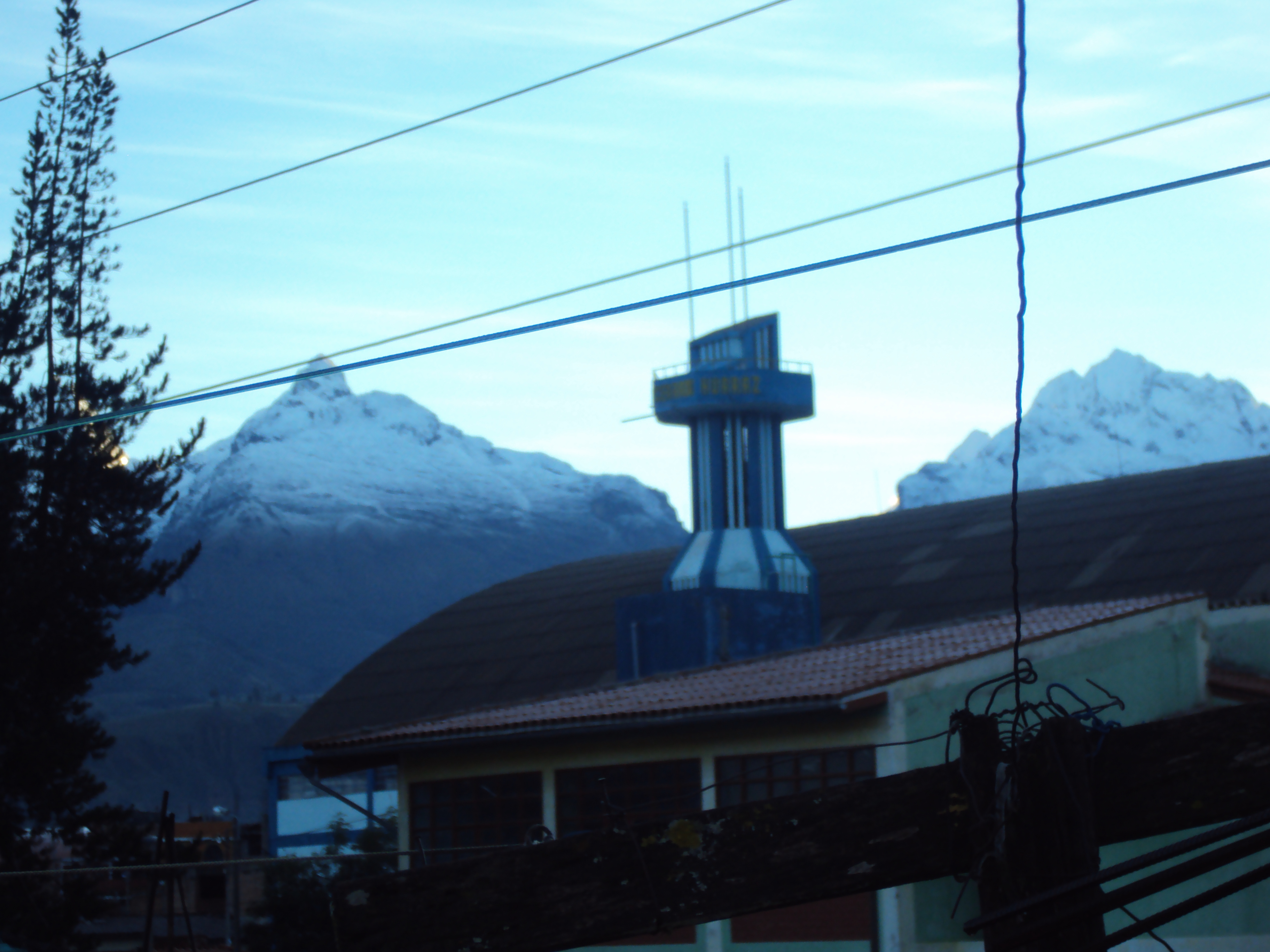
Coliseum of Huaraz. The snowy peaks of Rima Rima and Churup can be seen in the background.

As in all of Peru, soccer is the most popular sport in Huaraz. The Rosas Pampa Stadium is the main site for soccer tournaments like the Peruvian Soccer League. This stadium has a capacity for 20,000 people. The most representative soccer team in the city is Sport Ancash, the only Huaraz team to participate in Peruvian first division soccer league from 2005 to 2009.

== Transportation ==
=== Roads ===
Huaraz is connected to the Pacific coast by three highways. One goes generally westward, another goes south then west, and the other goes north then west. All three roads go from the Andes down into the desert coastal region.

The westward route rises into the Cordillera Negra, crests at about 4000 m (ca. 13,100 ft), then winds downward in altitude to the coastal city of Casma on the Pan American Highway. (Casma is the largest population center between the cities of Lima and Chimbote.)

The southward route from Huaraz goes about 40 km toward the town of Recuay, where it turns west. It rises to about 4,300 m (ca. 14,000 ft) where it crests the south part of the Cordillera Negra. From there the narrow winding highway in a distance of about 80 km (ca. 60 miles) descends to the town of Huarmey (south of Casma) on the coast. Here it connects with the Pan-American Highway (187 km north of Lima).

The northward route going north from Huaraz follows the Rio Santa to the north end of the Callejón de Huaylas, where it branches into two. The minor branch goes steeply westward up to the ancient town of Huaylas and then northwestward down to the coast. The main highway goes north beside the Cañón del Pato through a dozen one-lane tunnels, precipitously descends several thousand meters by switch-backs and hairpin curves on the one-lane rocky roadway, and arrives at the town of Huallanca. Here there is a connection with the Santa Railway. The highway again splits. The most heavily traveled fork continues generally west to the coastal city of Chimbote where it connects with the Pan-American Highway. The other fork goes from Huallanca northward and upward into the northern Peruvian Andes.

Travel by vehicle via any of the three highway routes from Huaraz to the coast generally requires seven to eight hours to either Lima or Chimbote.

=== Public transportation ===
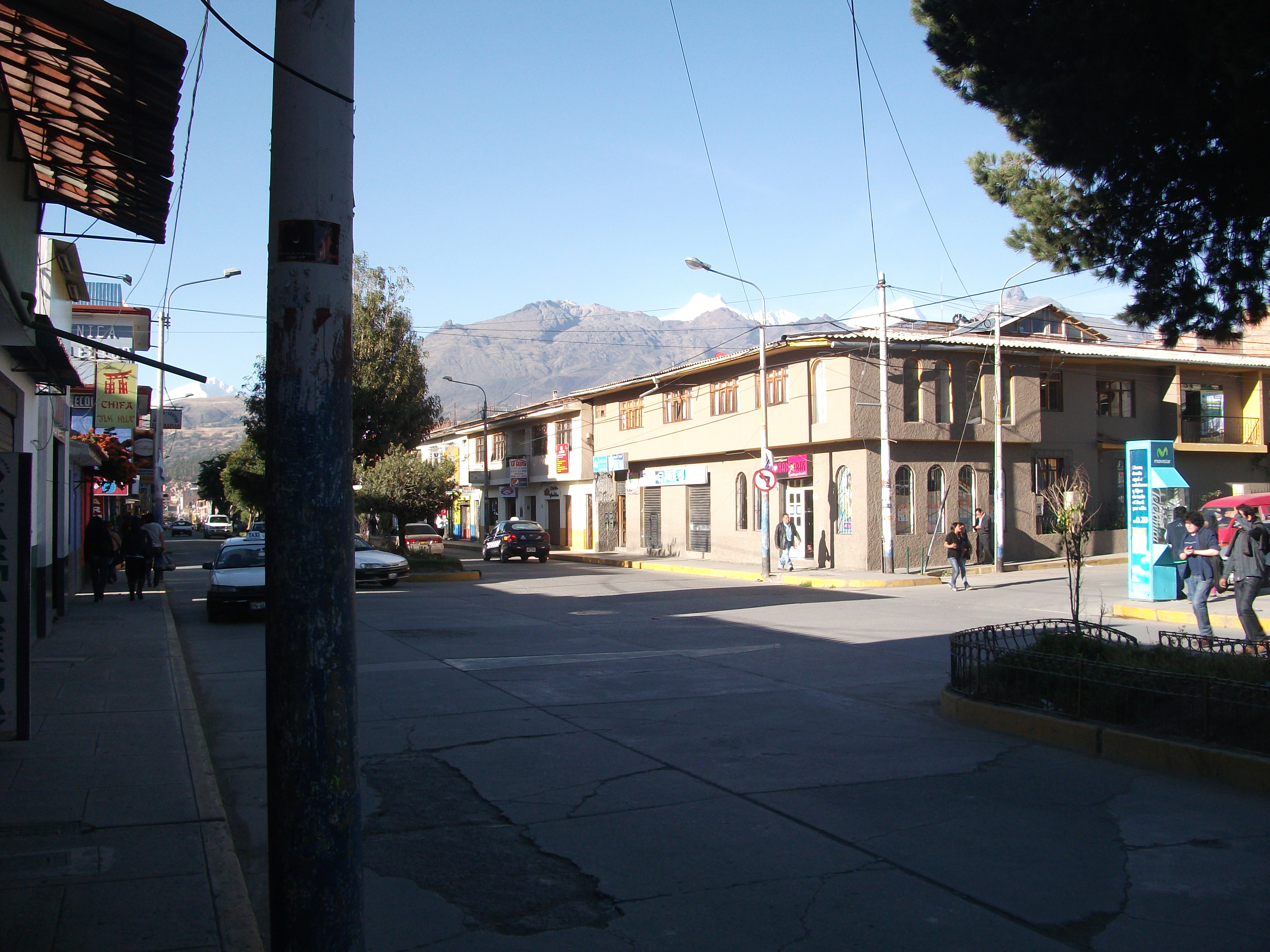
Luzuriaga Avenue

Huaraz's mass transit is operated by private companies authorized by city hall and the transportation secretary of Peru. The system includes vans and buses, that has organized routes but in an informal way. People commute on them or in their private cars. Taxis can be taken at designated stops, and in comparison to another big Peruvian cities, is cheaper but depending on the distance the price can increase. Also there are colectivos (commuter taxis) that have routes similar to buses and can be shared with other passengers in comparison to taxis.

=== Air transportation ===
Less than 40 minutes drive north from Huaraz lies the Comandante FAP Germán Arias Graziani Airport located in the village of Anta; the airfield serves small planes from the two largest mining companies in the region.

== Tourism ==
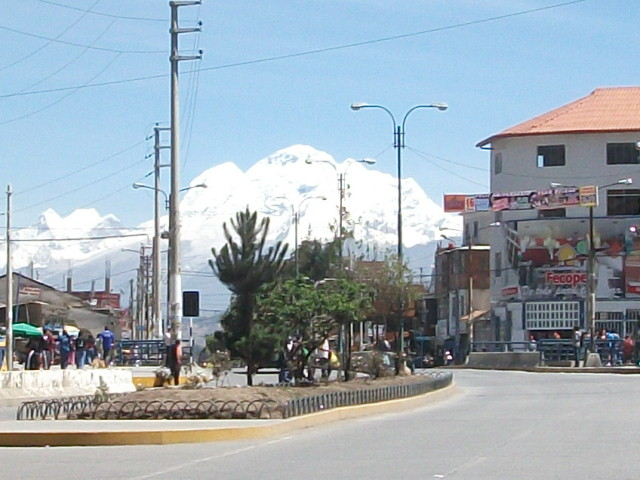
Huascaran Mountain seen from Huaraz

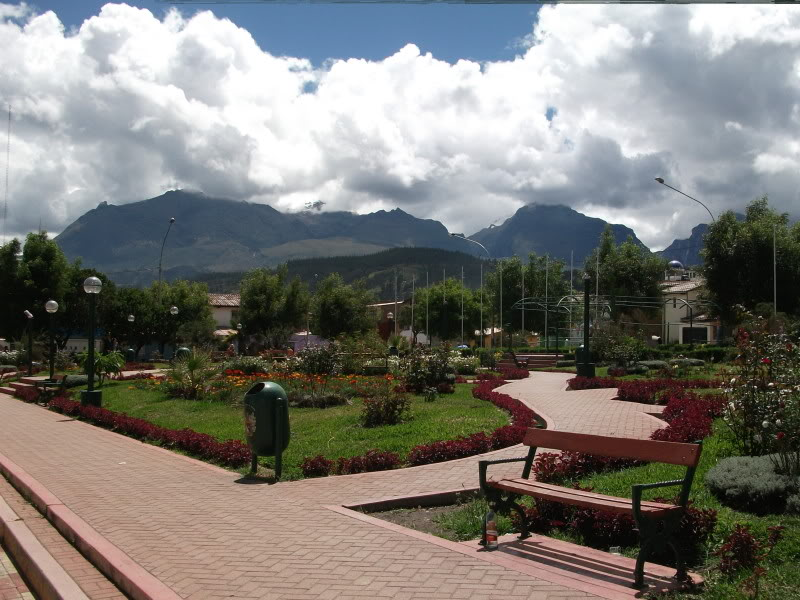
Park of International Friendship

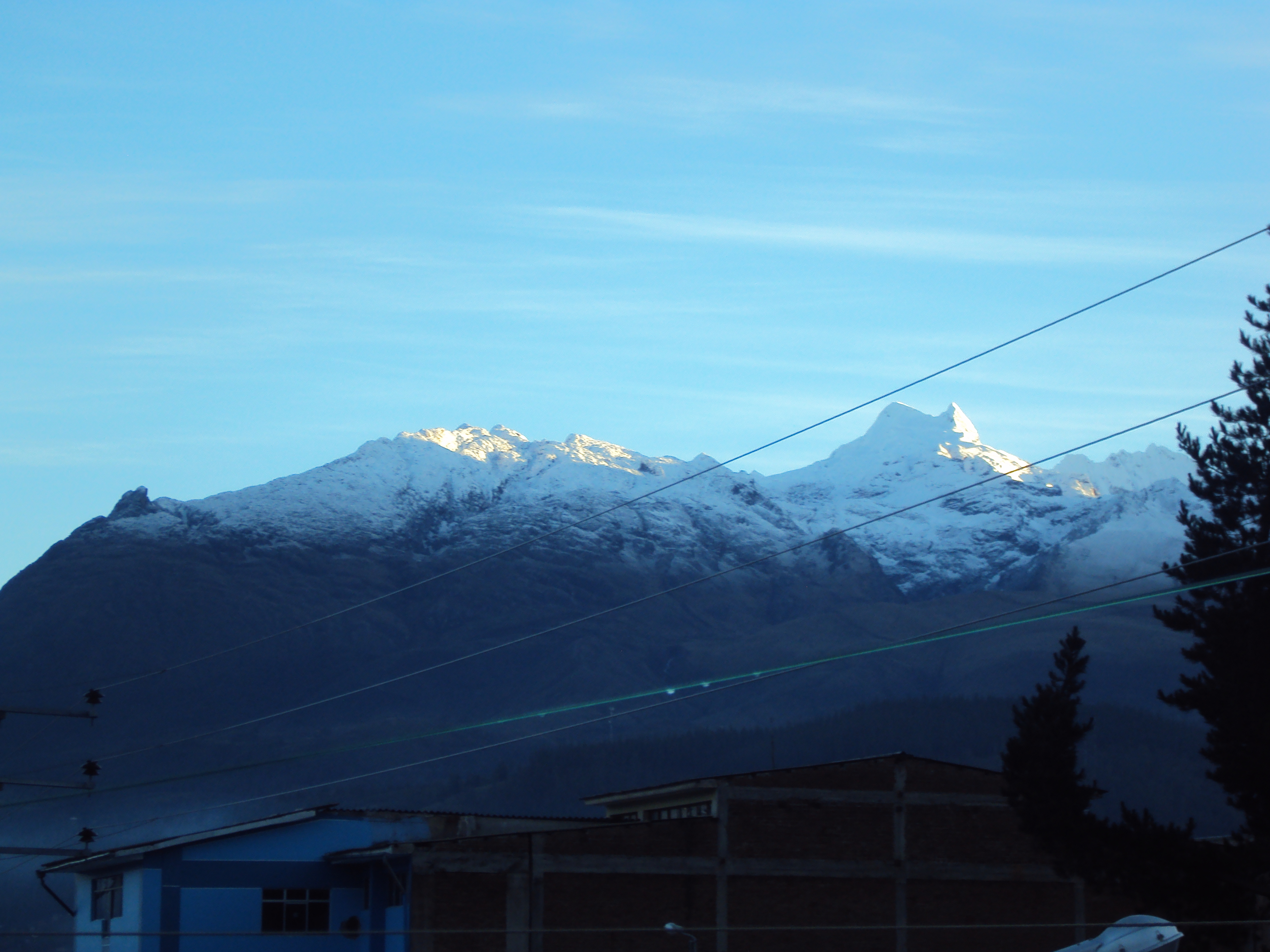
Snow peaks in Cordillera Blanca

In the city, prairies, forests and snow peaks can be seen from the urban center. But inside Huaraz, there are some tourist sites to visit. At La Soledad, there is the Lord of Soledad Chapel, which contains crucified Christ, that was founded during colony times. Also there are pre-Hispanic ruins, 3 miles from the city in Wilcahuain, where there are stone palaces of Wari culture. Other ruins are located 1 mile from Huaraz in Waullac, surrounded by big prairies with views of snow peaks and mountains.

At downtown across from the Plaza de Armas (main Square) is located the Museum of Ancash, which contains a lot of value pieces of the Recuay culture, and in this museum there is the Monolithic Park, which is considered one of the largest in America.

8 miles north from Huaraz, the Monterrey Baths are located, which contain hot springs with medicinal properties, and also is an ecological place surrounded by forests, where there are lodges and some upscales hotels.

Huaraz is the touristic operation center of the region, drawing thousands of visitors that practice adventure and winter sports. Also, Huascarán National Park, which is considered a biosphere reserve, is a destination for tourists.

The peaks of the region have for many decades been the testing grounds for mountain climbers anticipating future expeditions into the Himalayas. Huaraz is a base for expeditions into the Cordillera Blanca and the Huayhuash mountain range south of the Callejón del Huaylas.

In the streets surrounding the farmers' market, the paraditas (street markets) of local sellers offer handicraft products such as ponchos, alpaca textiles (carpets, sweaters, etc.); jewelry made of locally mined tin, copper, and silver; cuarteados (a typical dessert from the nearby town of Caraz made by mixing manjarblanco and fruit cake); boxes of manjarblanco, butter, cheese, honey, smoked and salty hams, jerky (Quechua charqui), etc.

Huaraz is known as the 'Switzerland of the South' because of the mountain peaks that are visible from the city centre.

Pre-Inca trail trekking is most popular in the region, featured by its stone paved trail that leads to Chavin, and also uses llamas for packing while on trekking.

== Culture ==
=== Museum and the arts ===
Huaraz is home to some museums. Across from Main Square is located the Archaeological Museum of Ancash. This museum presents three levels divided in four rooms, and in each one, there is an exhibition of cultural manifestations made by the different human groups have inhabited the Ancash Region. At this museum there is the Monolithic Park, that is considered the biggest stone park in South America.

Huaraz also is home of the Cultural Center of Huaraz that became a new arts hub. It opened in 2012 and it is considered one of the biggest theaters of Peru.

=== Cuisine ===
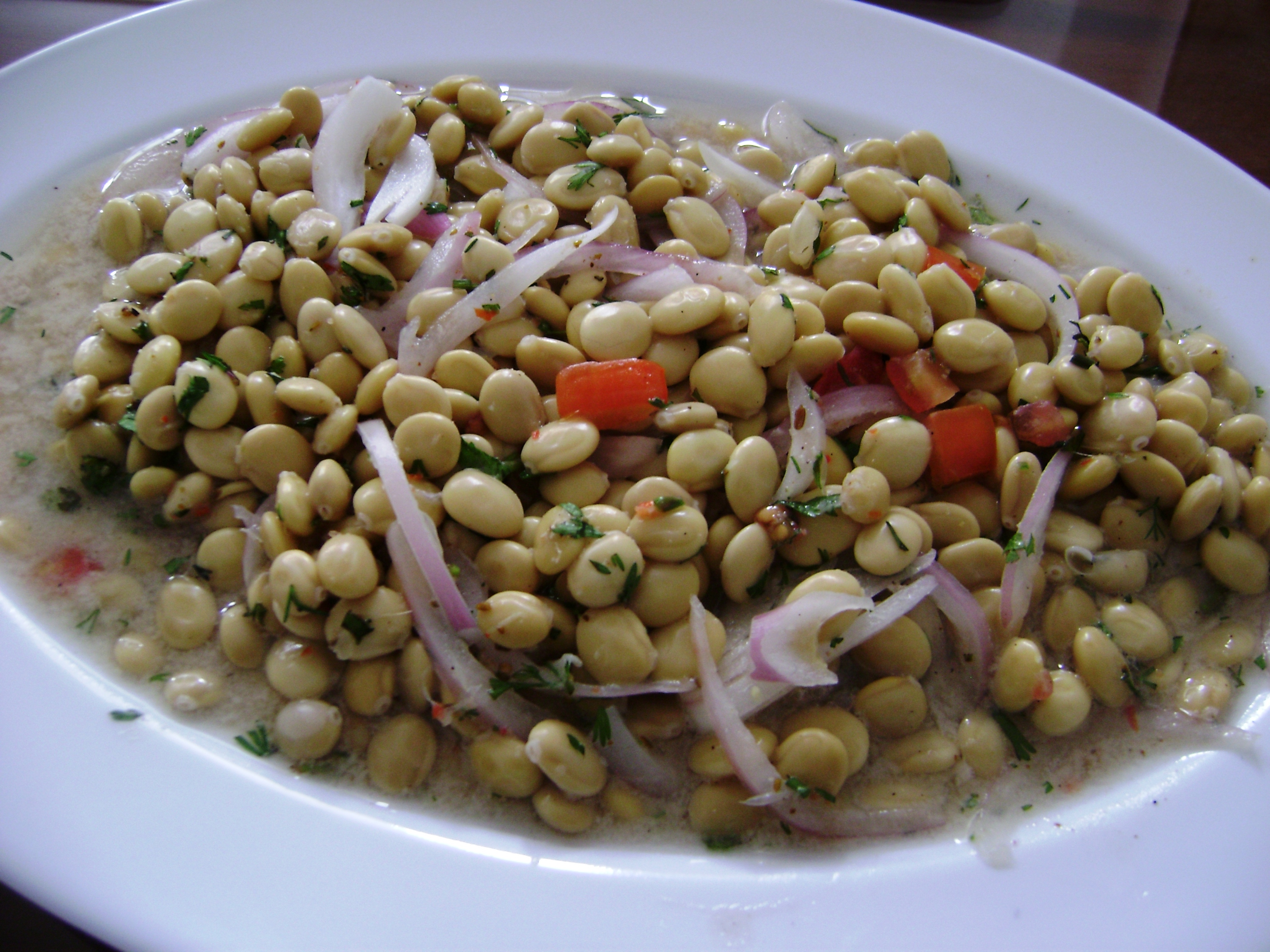
Ceviche de chochos, a popular dish in Huaraz based on beans of Lupinus mutabilis, onions, ají and lemon juice

The cuisine of Huaraz is considered to be one of the most recognized in the Peruvian Andes. Among the most popular dishes are Picante de Cuy (a roasted guinea pig in a sauce of red spices, served with boiled potatoes), Llunca de gallina (a chicken soup prepared with boiled wheat and yellow spices), Charqui de Chancho and res (roasted pork and beef salted and dried), Pachamanca (a dish prepared on the ground with hot stones, made of different kind of meats as beef, chicken, pork with baked corn and potatoes), Pataska (a hot soup, made with boiled corn and pork or beef skin), Ceviche de Chocho (raw fish marinated in lemon juice served with chocho, a typical legume), and Jamón Huaracino (salty and dried ham). There are some desserts like Api de Calabaza (sweet cream made of mashed pumpkin) and beverages, such as Chicha de Jora (sour yellow corn).

== Media ==
Huaraz has many local newspapers and three local television channels that run in the early morning. Most media organizations are located around the main square in the Municipality of Huaraz and share information during the day. Governmental information comes from the office Imagen. There are many printing companies, most of which specialize in business cards and leaflets. You can find them crossing the bridge towards Centenario or on Gamarra Street. The national post service, can be found on the Plaza de Armas. Channel three and thirteen are the local TV channels that operate in the morning.

== Newspapers ==
Most national newspapers as El Comercio, Peru 21 and Correo can be purchased early in the morning as those are flown in from Lima. Among the newspapers published in the city of Huaraz; one is Diario Ya, another newspaper is Prensa Regional.

== English language newspaper ==
Since the beginning of April 2012, Huaraz also had a free English language newspaper called The Huaraz Telegraph, read by students of the language schools and tourists. The newspaper covered the story of a missing Canadian backpacker, Jesse Galganov.

== See also ==
- Huamashraju
- Huaraz District
- Ocshapalca
- Pucaranra
- Rima Rima
- Shacsha
- Tocllaraju
- Vallunaraju
