= Ranrapalca =

Mountain in Peru

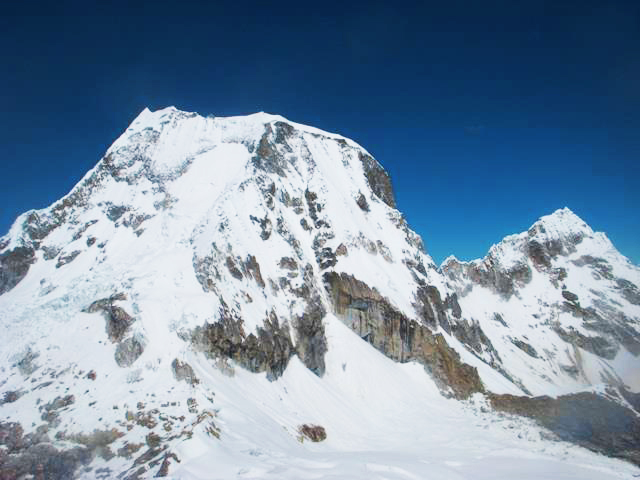
- Ranrapalca (on the left) and Ocshapalca (on the right) as seen from the north-east (near the Ishinca glacier)

Highest point
- Elevation: 6,162 m (20,217 ft)
- Prominence: 2,909 m (9,544 ft)
- Parent peak: Chinchey
- Coordinates: 9°24′39.27″S 077°25′00.12″W

Geography
- Location within Peru
- Location: Ancash, Peru
- Parent range: Andes, Cordillera Blanca

Climbing
- First ascent: Northeast ridge 06/25/1939 - Hans Schweizer, Karl Schmid, Siegfried Rohrer and Walter Brecht (Germany)

Ranrapalca (possibly from Quechua ranra stony, pallqa bifurcation, division into two parts) is a mountain in the Cordillera Blanca range in the Andes of Peru. It has an elevation of 6,162 m (20,217 ft). It is located in the region of Ancash, east of Ocshapalca. Its territory is within Huascarán National Park, province of Huaraz, within the territory of the local communes Independencia and Tarica.

== Climbing ==
The northeast ridge (normal route) is of intermediate difficulty (rated D range according to the International French Adjectival System). It consists in climbing a steep, rocky ridge from the Ranrapallqa-Ischinca col to the summit snowfields and 6,000 m and then traverse south of the knife edge summit. An easier variant of the normal route consists in avoiding the northeast ridge. From the Ranrapallqa-Ischinca col the summit snowfields can be reached climbing the easy snow slopes on the left of the ridge but this route, albeit slightly easier is more exposed to seracs and loose rocks. Many other routes exist, some of them quite difficult (such as the east ridge and south face, both rated TD+).

== First Ascent ==
Ranrapalca was first climbed by Hans Schweizer, Karl Schmid, Siegfried Rohrer and Walter Brecht (Germany) 25 June 1939.

== Elevation ==
Other data from available digital elevation models: SRTM 6132 metres, ASTER 6108 metres and TanDEM-X 6067 metres. The height of the nearest key col is 3253 meters, leading to a topographic prominence of 2909 meters. Ranrapalca is considered a Mountain Sub-System according to the Dominance System and its dominance is 47.21%. Its parent peak is Chinchey and the Topographic isolation is 10 kilometers.

== Images ==
Ocshapalca (on the left) and Ranrapalca (on the right), the Llaca Glacier and the Llaca Lake

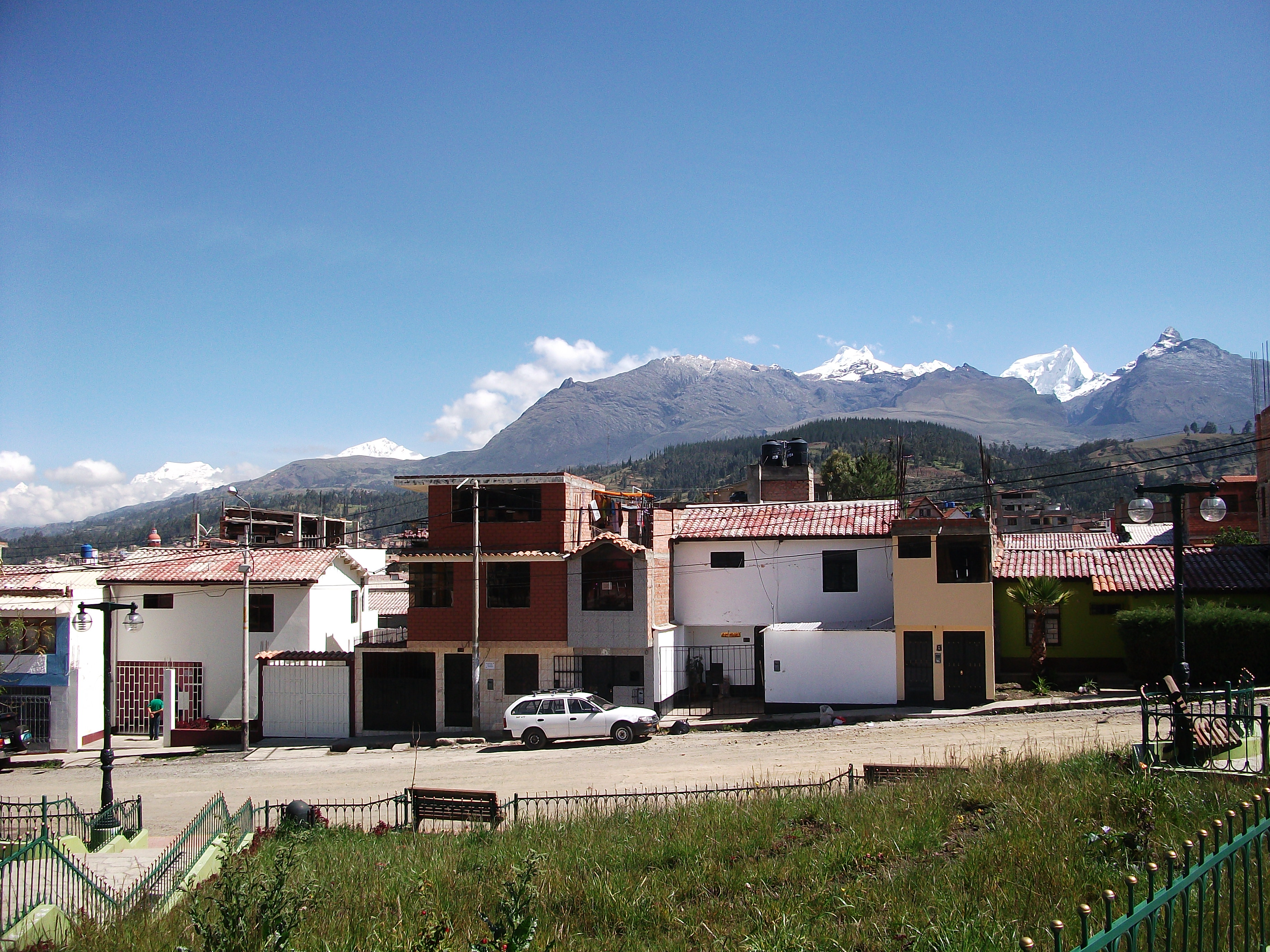
Vallunaraju, Ocshapalca, Ranrapalca (the snow-covered mountains on the right) as seen from Huaraz
