= Wallqaqucha =

Lake in the Cordillera Blanca, Peru

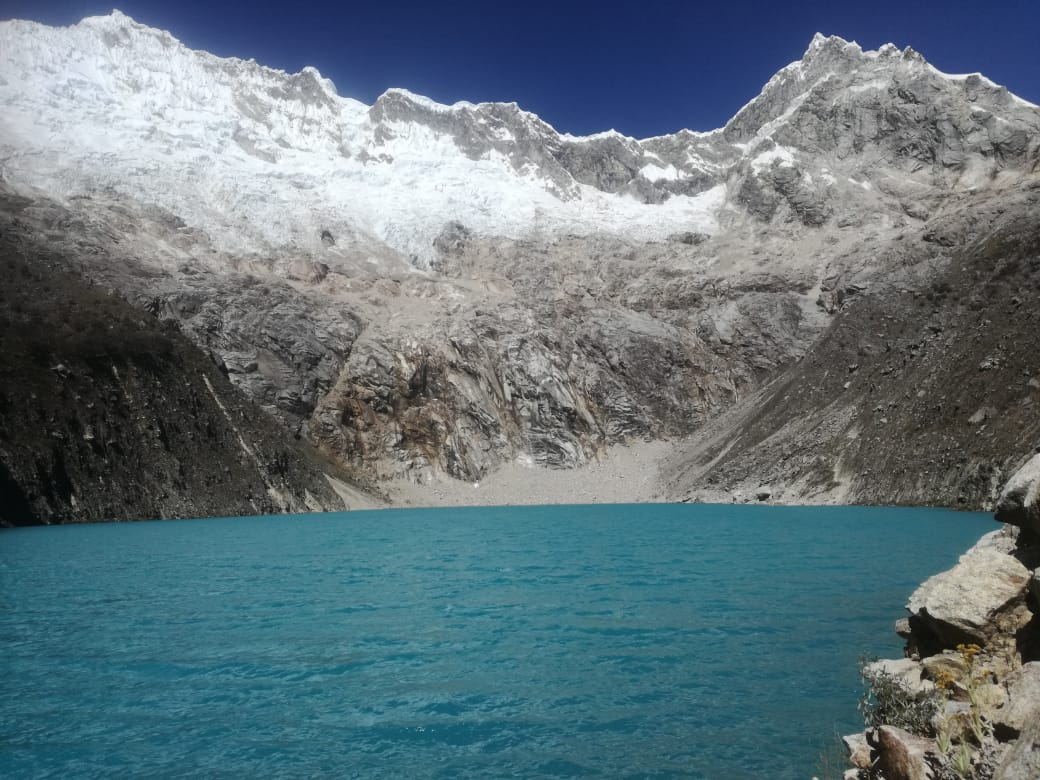

- Location within Peru
- Location: Peru; Ancash Region
- Coordinates: 9°09′43″S 77°32′38″W
- Surface area: 0.163066 km^{2} (163,066 m^{2})
- Surface elevation: 4,355 m (14,288 ft)

Wallqaqucha (Quechua wallqa collar, qucha lake, "collar lake", also spelled Huallcacocha) is a lake in the Cordillera Blanca in the Andes of Peru. It is situated at a height of 4,355 m (14,288 ft) comprising an area of 0.163066 km^{2} (163,066 m^{2}). It is located in the Ancash Region, Carhuaz Province, Shilla District, northwest of Wallqan. Wallqaqucha lies at the feet of Chiqllarahu, northeast and north of Awkishqucha and Chiqllaqucha.
