= Vicos =

Mountain in Peru

- Paccharuri
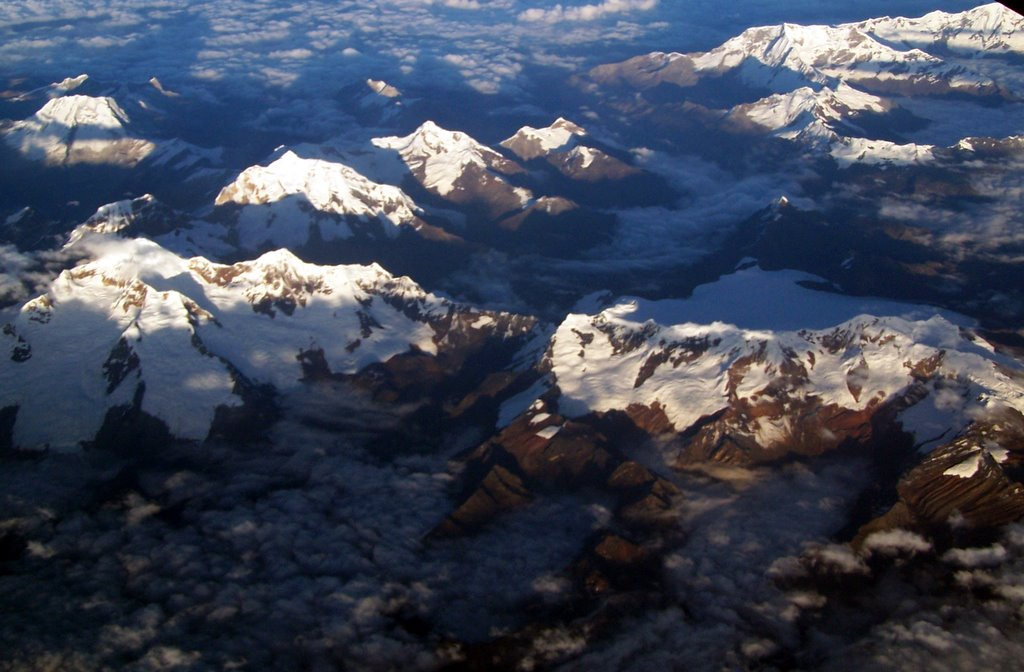
- Aerial view of the Cordillera Blanca as seen from the east with Paccharuri in the upper part of the image (center-right)

Highest point
- Elevation: 5,315 m (17,438 ft)
- Coordinates: 9°17′34″S 77°29′13″W

Geography
- Location within Peru
- Location: Ancash, Peru
- Parent range: Andes, Cordillera Blanca

Climbing
- First ascent: 1952 Alberto Morales Arnap, A. Gamarra, J. Mariategui, J. Torres, L. Vidal

Vicos or Paccharuri (possibly from Ancash Quechua paqtsa waterfall, ruri inside; valley or little river) is a 5,315 m (17,438 ft) high mountain in the Cordillera Blanca in the Andes of Peru. It is situated in the Ancash Region, Carhuaz Province, Marcara District. Paccharuri lies in the Huascarán National Park, southwest of Copa and southeast of Lake Lejiacocha.
