= Chequiacocha (Ancash) =

Lake in Peru

- Location within Peru
- Location: Peru; Ancash Region
- Coordinates: 9°11′05″S 77°32′44″W

Chequiacocha (possibly from Quechua chiqlla green, qucha lake, "green lake") is a lake in Peru located in the Ancash Region, Carhuaz Province, Shilla District. Chequiacocha is situated at the very end of the Auquiscocha ravine, between the mountain Chequiaraju in the northwest and the Hualcán in the southeast, south of Huallcacocha and northeast of Auquiscocha.
