= Lake Auquiscocha =

Lake in Áncash, Peru

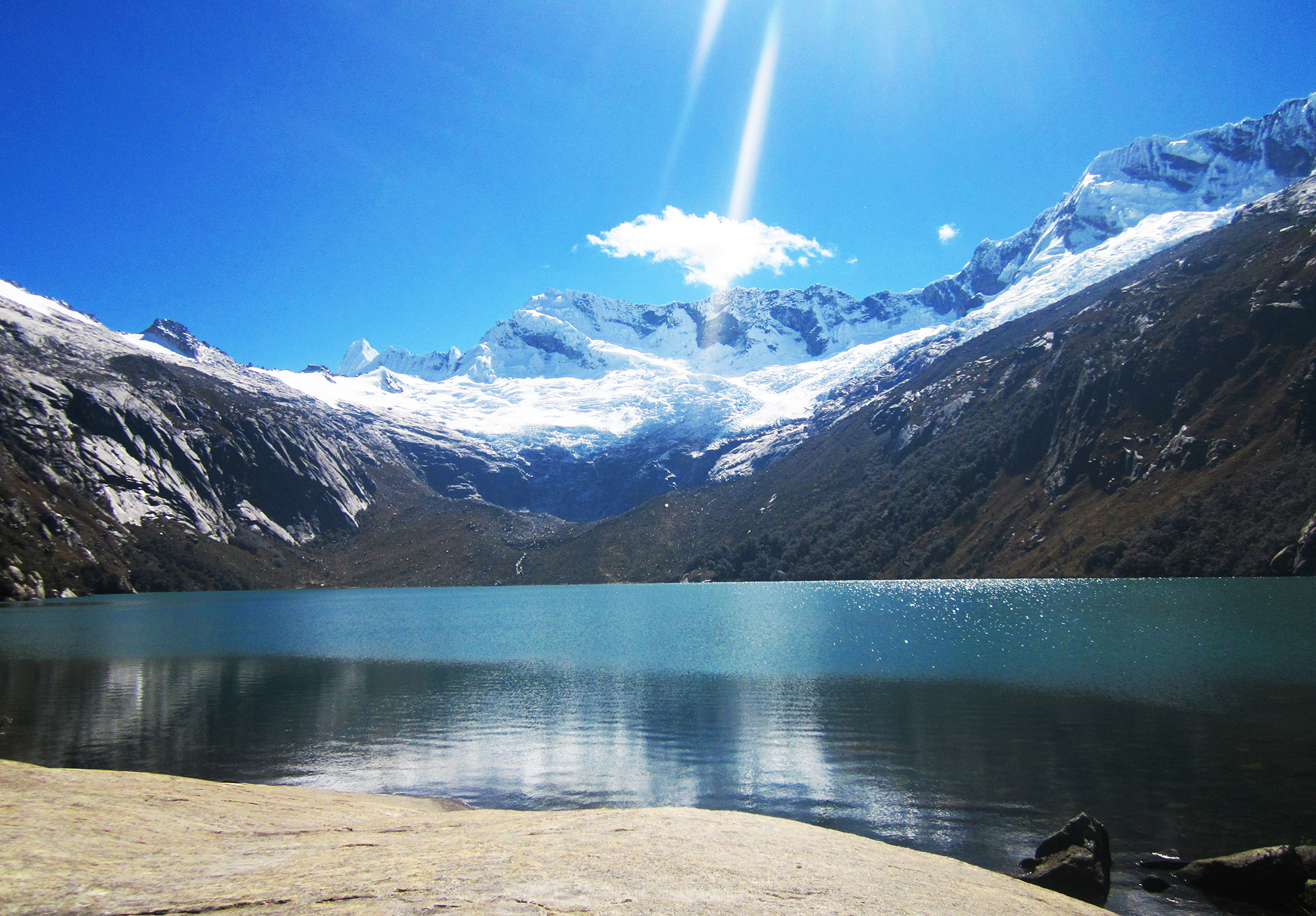
- Auquiscocha and the Chajiaco glacier

- Location within Peru
- Location: Peru; Ancash
- Coordinates: 9°11′35″S 77°33′24″W
- Surface elevation: 4,303 m (14,117 ft)

Lake Auquiscocha or Auquishcocha (both possibly from Wanka Quechua awkish to water, to irrigate; to give to drink, Quechua awki prince; a mythical figure of the Andean culture, qucha lake) is a lake in the Cordillera Blanca in the Andes of Peru located in the Ancash Region, Carhuaz Province, Shilla District. It is situated at a height of about 4,303 metres (14,117 ft). Auquiscocha lies at the foot of Chequiaraju in the north and Hualcán in the southeast, southwest of Lake Chequiacocha.
