= Legiamayo River =

Legiamayo
- Etymology: Quechua

Location
- Country: Peru
- Region: Ancash Region

Physical characteristics
- Mouth: Santa River

Legiamayo or Lejiamayu (possibly from Quechua lliklla a rectangular shoulder cloth, mayu river) is a river in Peru located in the Ancash Region, Carhuaz Province, Marcará District. It originates in the Cordillera Blanca west of mount Copa, near Lake Lejiacocha. It is a tributary of the Marcará River, which in turn is a tributary of the Santa River.
