= Chiqllaqucha =

Chiqllaqucha may refer to:

- Chiqllaqucha, Ancash
- Chiqllaqucha, Junín
