= Carhuaz =

- Town
- Flag Seal

- Location within Peru
- Coordinates: 9°16′53″S 77°38′47″W
- Country: Peru
- Region: Ancash Region
- Province: Carhuaz Province

Carhuaz, Peru is the capital of the province of Carhuaz. It is located in the Ancash Region, Carhuaz Province, Carhuaz District.

== Geography ==
It is situated at 34 km from Huaraz, at 2,688 msnm. Its temperature average is from 12 to 14 degrees Celsius. Near this city, the hot springs of Monterrey and the airport of Anta are located.

== History ==
Carhuaz was created by law 7951 of December 14, 1934. It is similar to those of the other cities of the Callejón de Huaylas. Its name derives from qarwash which means yellow, that is to say, the color of the retama flowers (broom flowers) that covers the hills that are contiguous to the city.

From its main square, the snow-capped mountain Wallqan (6,126 m) can be seen. This mountain is known as the second Waskaran. The city displays a Hispanic and colonial style, keeping its old casonas.

The zone, located in the right margin of the Santa river, has a moderate and agreeable climate. It also has abundant agricultural products, especially fragrant fruits. In the surroundings, there are propitious places for hunting tarukas, partridges and viscachas, as well as for fishing trout.

At 8 km to the south of Carhuaz the village Marcará is located from where a road of 4 km departs. This road leads to the mineral-medicinal fountains of Chancos which has been dubbed "the Fountain of Youth". Other hot springs are the ones from La Merced and La Providencia.

== Climate ==
Climate data for Carhuaz (Anta), elevation 2,748 m (9,016 ft)
Month	Jan	Feb	Mar	Apr	May	Jun	Jul	Aug	Sep	Oct	Nov	Dec	Year
Mean daily maximum °C (°F)	23.4 (74.1)	22.8 (73.0)	22.9 (73.2)	23.4 (74.1)	24.1 (75.4)	24.0 (75.2)	24.1 (75.4)	24.2 (75.6)	24.5 (76.1)	24.5 (76.1)	24.6 (76.3)	24.1 (75.4)	23.9 (75.0)
Mean daily minimum °C (°F)	8.5 (47.3)	8.7 (47.7)	9.0 (48.2)	8.6 (47.5)	6.7 (44.1)	5.2 (41.4)	4.1 (39.4)	4.8 (40.6)	6.1 (43.0)	7.1 (44.8)	7.9 (46.2)	8.3 (46.9)	7.1 (44.8)
Average precipitation mm (inches)	105.5 (4.15)	140.8 (5.54)	136.2 (5.36)	48.6 (1.91)	18.0 (0.71)	5.6 (0.22)	0.6 (0.02)	5.1 (0.20)	31.1 (1.22)	47.4 (1.87)	66.5 (2.62)	71.3 (2.81)	676.7 (26.63)
Source: Pontificia Universidad Católica del Perú

== See also ==
- Ancash Region
- Carhuaz Province
