= Chiquiacocha (Junín) =

Lake in Junín, Peru

- Location within Peru
- Location: Peru; Junín Region
- Coordinates: 11°06′33″S 75°54′43″W

Chiquiacocha (possibly from Quechua chiqlla green, qucha lake, "green lake") is a lake in Peru located in the Junín Region, Junín Province, Junín District. Chiquiacocha lies east of Lake Junin and south of the lake Alcacocha.
