= Pariahuanca District =

Pariahuanca District may refer to:

- Pariahuanca District, Carhuaz
- Pariahuanca District, Huancayo
