= Junín District =

Coordinates: 11.1595°S 75.9924°W

Junín
- District
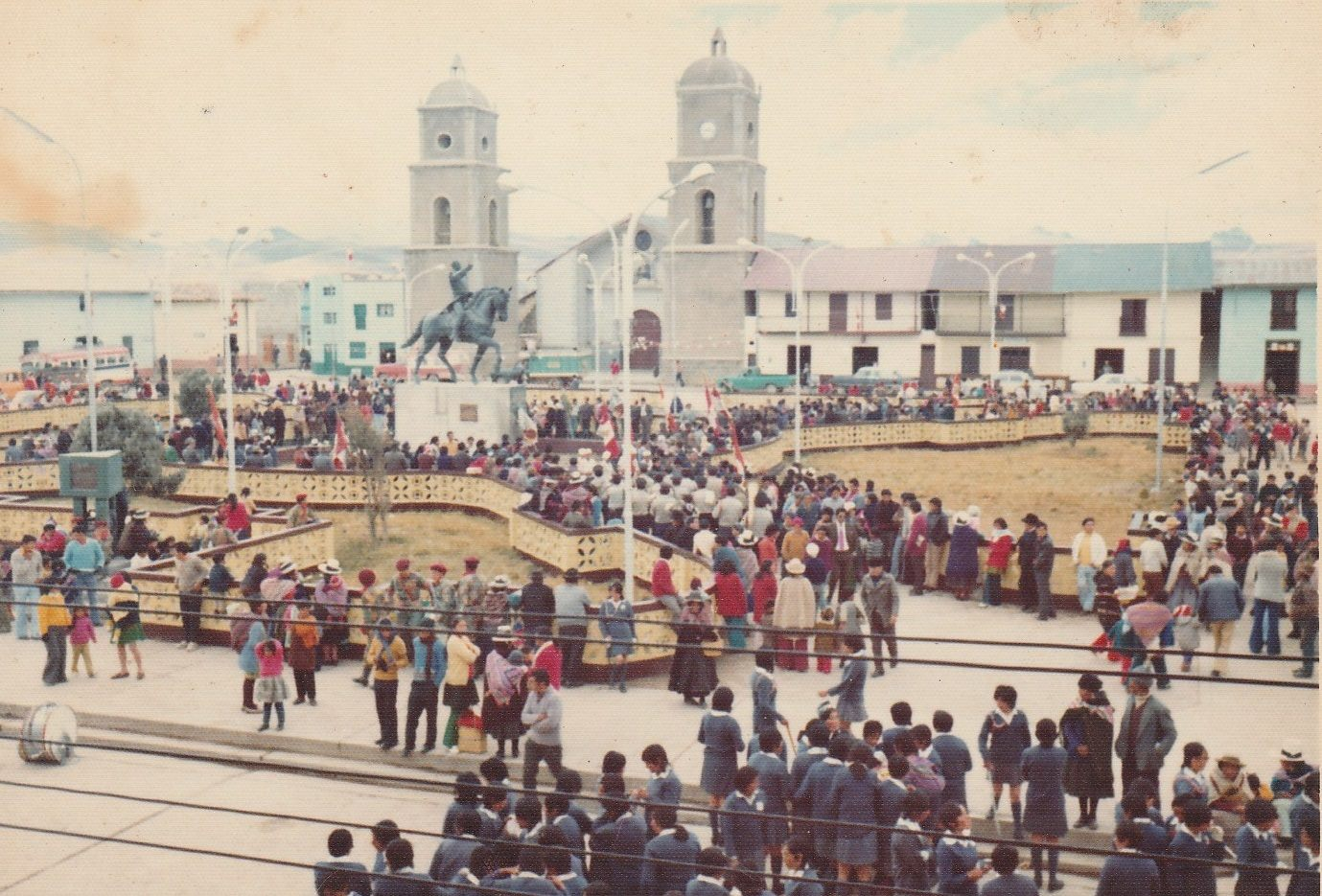

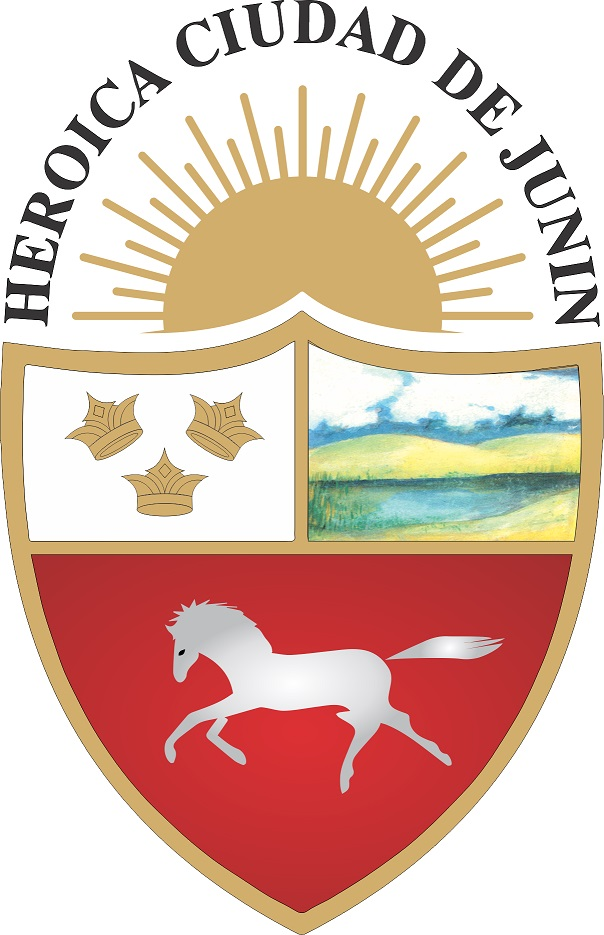
- Coat of arms
- Interactive map of Junín
- Country: Peru
- Region: Junín
- Province: Junín
- Capital: Junín

Government
  - Mayor: Jorge Luis Tejada

Area
  - Total: 883.8 km^{2} (341.2 sq mi)
- Elevation: 4,107 m (13,474 ft)

Population (2017)
  - Total: 10,976
  - Density: 12.42/km^{2} (32.17/sq mi)
- Time zone: UTC-5 (PET)
- UBIGEO: 120501

Junín District is one of four districts of the Junín Province in Peru.

== Geography ==
One of the highest peaks of the district is Wamanripa at approximately 4,600 m (15,100 ft). Other mountains are listed below:

- Allqupa Markan
- Anta Qucha
- Chunta
- Hatun Umash
- Huch'uy Mach'ay
- Jiris Mach'ay
- Kancha Wayin
- Kapilla Mach'ay
- Kiwyu
- Kuntur Kancha
- Llaksa Llaksa
- Marka Qucha
- Pata Wayi
- Punta Kancha
- Phiruru Rumi
- Qarwa Kancha
- Qarwaq
- Qiwlla
- Saqra Wayin
- Sillu Qaqa
- Tuna Kancha
- T'inti Mach'ay
- Waman Tanka
- Wanq'ur
- Waqrash
- Warmi Wañusqa
- Waychu Wachanan
- Wisq'a Mach'ay
- Yuraq Chaka
- Yuraq Kancha

== Climate ==
Climate data for Junin, elevation 4,101 m (13,455 ft), (1991–2020)
Month	Jan	Feb	Mar	Apr	May	Jun	Jul	Aug	Sep	Oct	Nov	Dec	Year
Mean daily maximum °C (°F)	12.6 (54.7)	12.3 (54.1)	12.2 (54.0)	12.6 (54.7)	13.0 (55.4)	12.9 (55.2)	12.9 (55.2)	13.5 (56.3)	13.1 (55.6)	13.1 (55.6)	13.6 (56.5)	12.7 (54.9)	12.9 (55.2)
Mean daily minimum °C (°F)	2.5 (36.5)	2.7 (36.9)	2.8 (37.0)	1.3 (34.3)	−0.3 (31.5)	−2.6 (27.3)	−3.9 (25.0)	−3.3 (26.1)	−1.1 (30.0)	0.4 (32.7)	0.6 (33.1)	1.8 (35.2)	0.1 (32.1)
Average precipitation mm (inches)	138.7 (5.46)	147.7 (5.81)	121.2 (4.77)	64.9 (2.56)	39.4 (1.55)	14.8 (0.58)	14.2 (0.56)	14.1 (0.56)	40.1 (1.58)	82.4 (3.24)	75.3 (2.96)	136.6 (5.38)	889.4 (35.01)
Source: National Meteorology and Hydrology Service of Peru

== See also ==
- Allqaqucha
- Antaqucha
- Chiqllaqucha
- Lake Junin
- Waqraqucha
