= Copa (mountain) =

Mountain in Peru

- Copa Grande, Pamparaju, Chucushcaraju or Carhuacatac
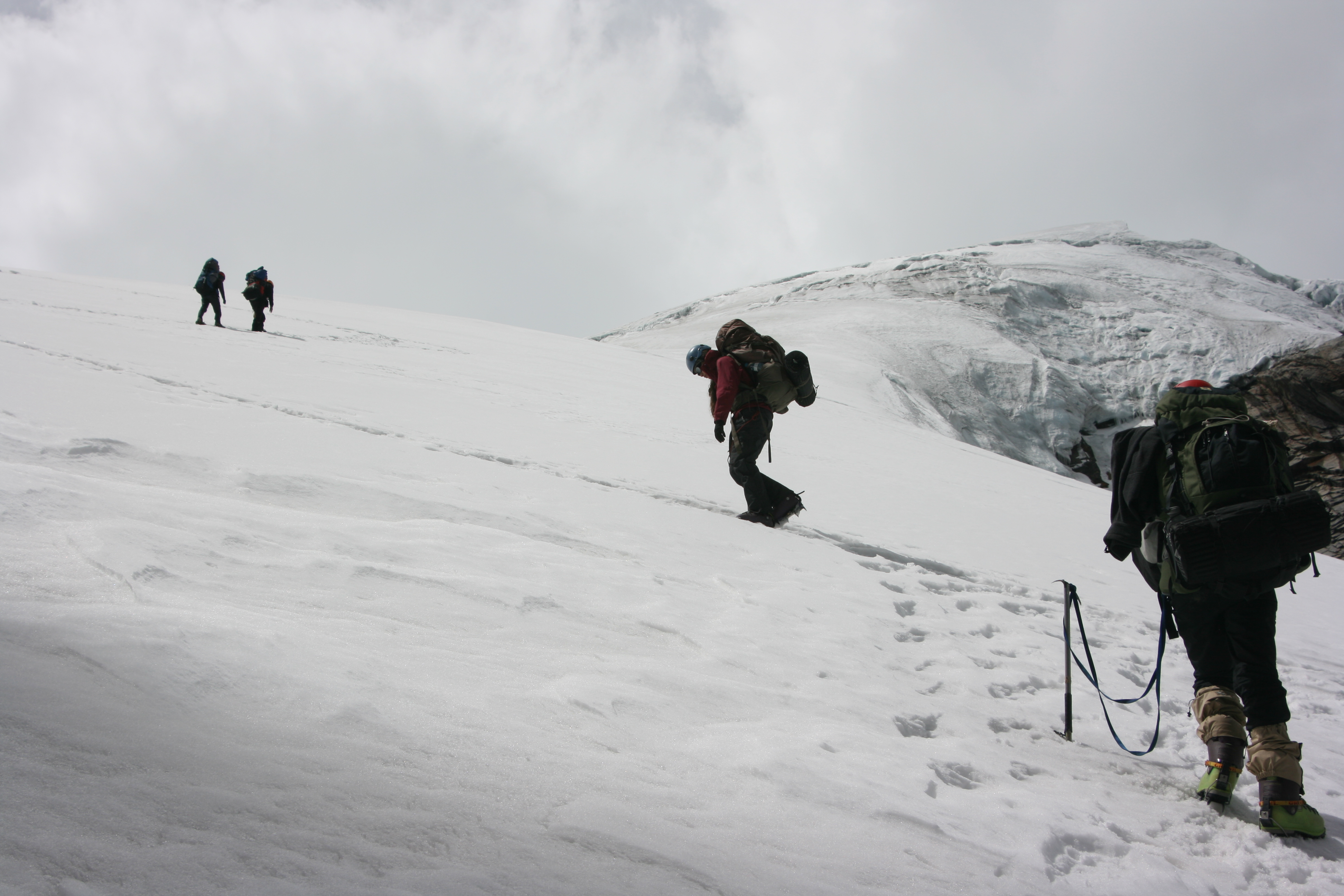

Highest point
- Elevation: 6,188 m (20,302 ft)
- Prominence: 2,907 m (9,537 ft)
- Parent peak: Hualcan
- Coordinates: 9°16′12.68″S 077°28′51.24″W

Geography
- Location within Peru
- Parent range: Cordillera Blanca, Andes

Climbing
- First ascent: 09/26/1932 - Erwin Hein and Erwin Schneider (Austria)

Nevado Copa (possibly from qupa, a Quechua word for the mineral turquoise and the turquoise color) is a mountain in the Andes of Peru whose summit reaches about 6,188 metres (20,302 ft) above sea level. It is situated in the Ancash Region, Asunción Province, Chacas District, and in the Carhuaz Province, Marcará District, south-east of Hualcán. Its territory is within the Peruvian protection area of Huascarán National Park and is part of the Cordillera Blanca.

Lake Allicocha lies south-east of Copa while Lake Lejiacocha is located to the south-west of the mountain. Legiamayo River originates from Mount Copa, in the area nearby Lake Lejiacocha.

== Alternative names ==
Copa is also named Chucushcaraju (possibly from Quechua chukuy to make someone put a headdress on / crouch, bend down, -sqa a suffix, rahu snow, ice, mountain with snow, "headdressed mountain with snow" or "crouched mountain with snow"), Pamparaju (possibly from Quechua pampa a large plain, "plain mountain with snow") or Carhuacatac (possibly from Quechua qarwa leaf worm, larva of a beetle / pale / yellowish / golden, qataq someone who covers someone or something with a blanket, t'aqaq sower).

== First Ascent ==
Copa was first climbed by Erwin Hein and Erwin Schneider (Austria) 26 September 1932.

== Elevation ==
Other data from available digital elevation models: SRTM yields 6130 metres, ASTER 6139 metres and TanDEM-X 6089 metres. The height of the nearest key col is 3253 meters, leading to a topographic prominence of 2907 meters. Copa is considered a Mountain Sub-System according to the Dominance System and its dominance is 47.19%. Its parent peak is Hualcán and the Topographic isolation is 8.6 kilometers.
