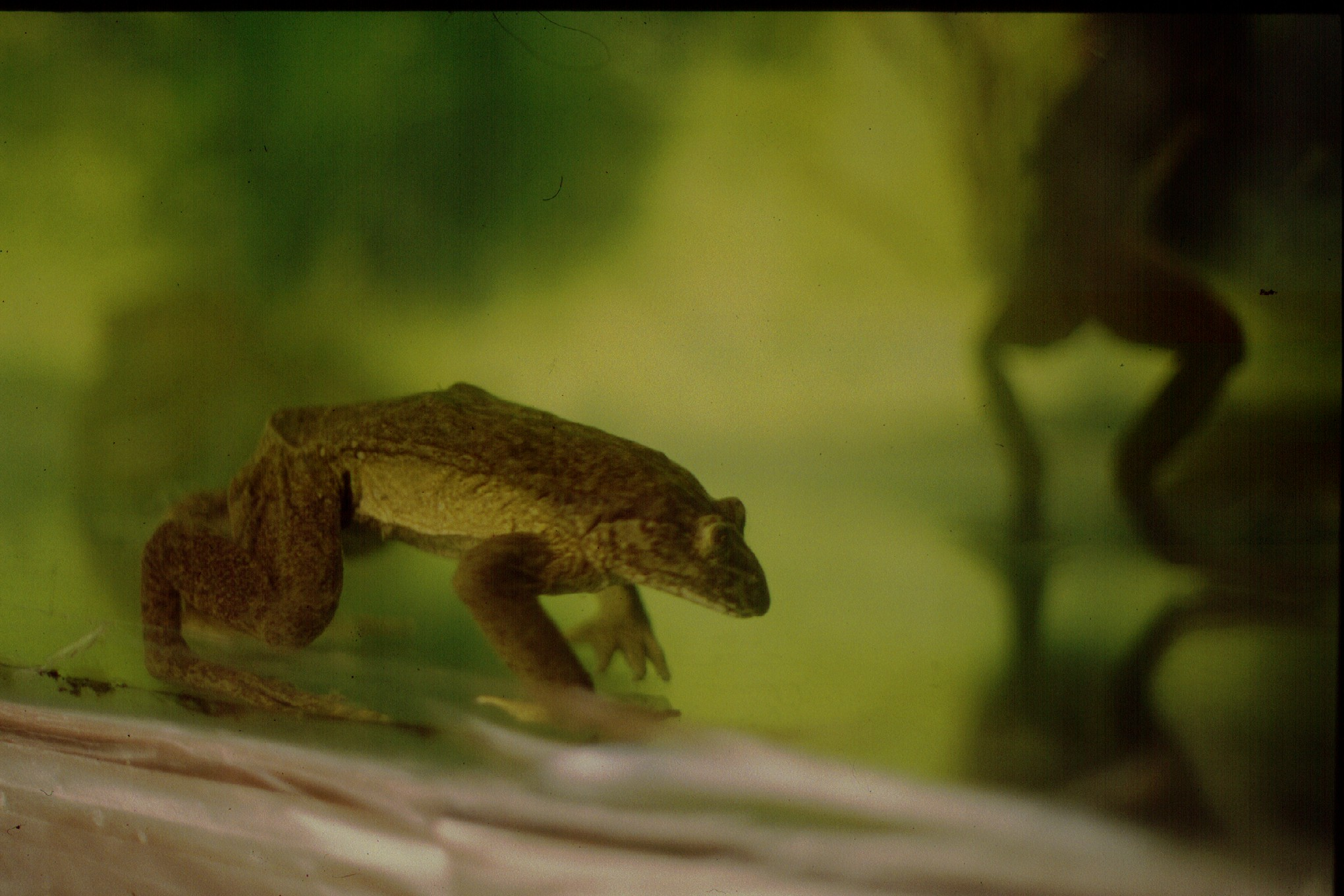
- Lake Junin frog in captivity

Conservation status
- Endangered (IUCN 3.1)

Scientific classification
- Kingdom: Animalia
- Phylum: Chordata
- Class: Amphibia
- Order: Anura
- Family: Telmatobiidae
- Genus: Telmatobius
- Species: T. macrostomus

Binomial name
- Telmatobius macrostomus (Peters, 1873)

Synonyms
- Batrachophrynus microphtalmus Werner, 1901; Batrachophrynus macrostomus Peters, 1873

= Telmatobius macrostomus =

Species of amphibian

Telmatobius macrostomus, also known as the Lake Junin (giant) frog or Andes smooth frog, is a very large and endangered species of frog in the family Telmatobiidae. This completely aquatic frog is endemic to lakes and associated waters at altitudes of 4,000–4,600 m (13,100–15,100 ft) in the Andes of Junín and Pasco in central Peru. It has been introduced to slow-moving parts of the upper Mantaro River, although it is unclear if this population still persists.

Together with the closely related Amable Maria frog (T. brachydactylus), it is sometimes placed in the genus Batrachophrynus.

== Ecology and appearance ==
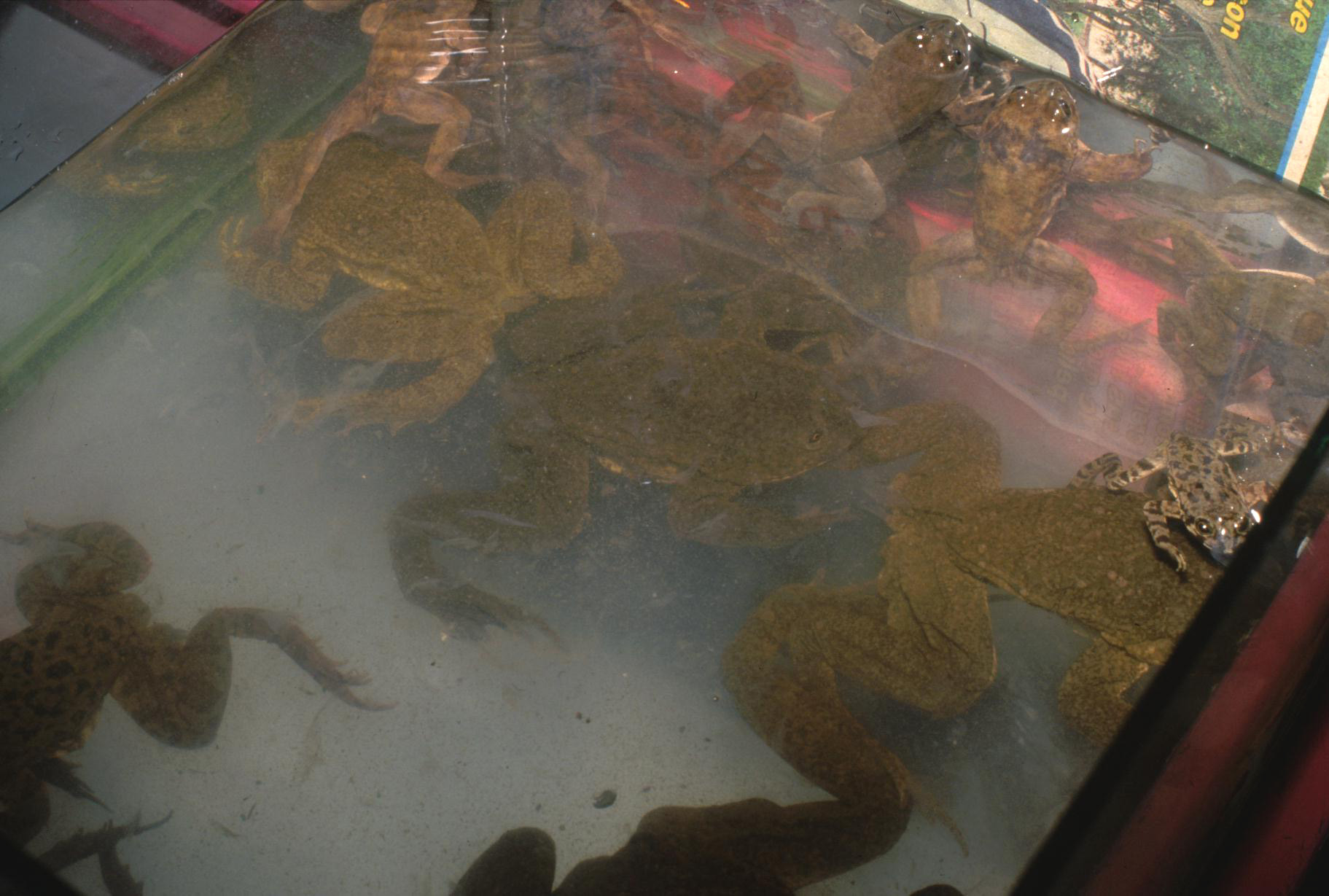
Lake Junin frog

T. macrostomus is completely aquatic, and restricted to lakes (notably Lake Junín) and waters that are directly connected to them like rivers, streams and canals. It has also been introduced to the upper part of the Mantaro River, but it is unclear if this population persists. It is found both in large marshy lakes and smaller deep lakes. This smooth-skinned, dark brownish frog generally ranges from shallow water to a depth of 12 m (39 ft), but prefers places with extensive aquatic vegetation and 1–5 m (3–16 ft) deep. In its native habitat the water temperature typically is between 7 and 17 °C (45–63 °F). Captives have been kept in aquariums for more than 5 years at around 20 °C (68 °F). It feeds on aquatic snails (especially Physidae), amphipods, aquatic insects (especially Baetidae mayfly larvae) and small fish.

T. macrostomus is among the largest frogs in the world and the largest exclusively aquatic frog, a title sometimes incorrectly awarded to its somewhat smaller relative, the Titicaca water frog (T. culeus). T. macrostomus measures up to 30 cm (12 in) in snout–vent length, and 70 cm (28 in) in total length including outstretched legs. It can weigh up to about 2 kg (4.5 lb), and the hindlegs alone can surpass 40 cm (16 in) in length. Very large individuals are rare; most adults have a snout–vent length of 12.4–17.3 cm (4.9–6.8 in) and weigh less than 0.5 kg (1.1 lb). Females grow larger than males. The tadpoles also grow very large, up to about 20 cm (8 in) in length.

== Conservation and threats ==
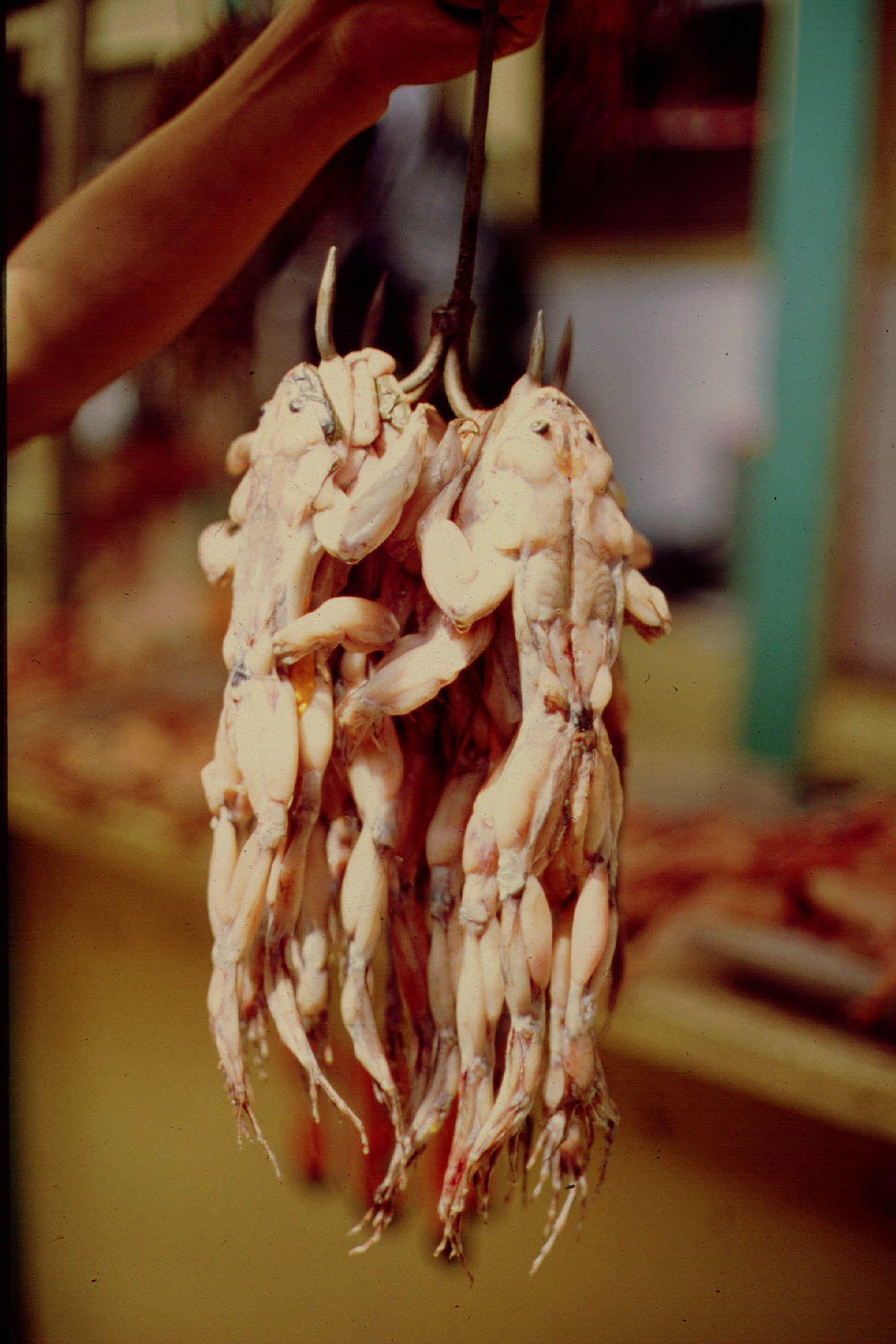
Lake Junin frogs sold for food

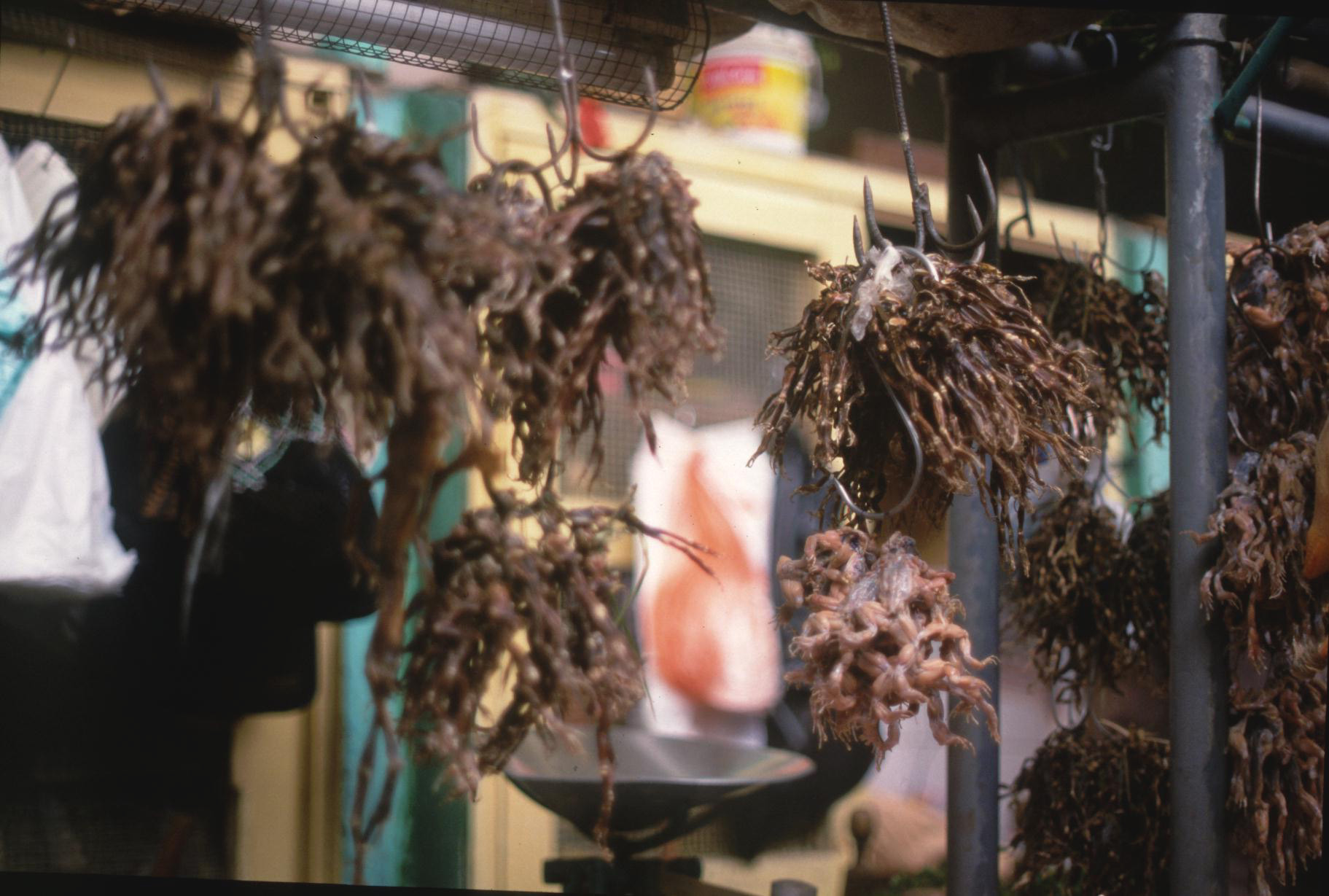
Dried aquatic frogs

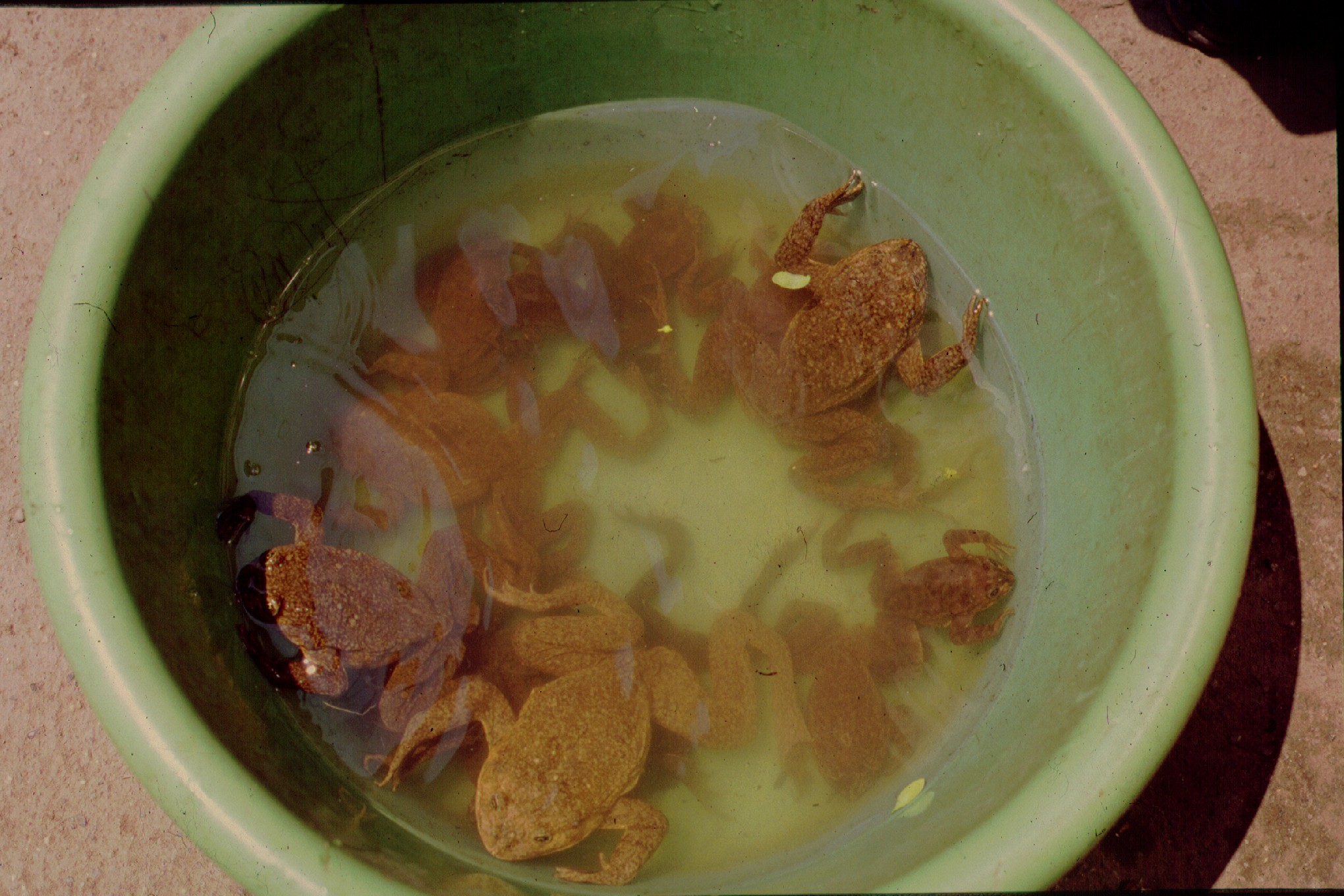
Lake Junin frog being sold in the Huancayo market

Once common, this frog is now rare and considered endangered by the IUCN. During a survey in 2012 it was only found at about 10% of the visited sites and in low densities, leading to the suggestion of recognizing it as critically endangered. The primary threats to the species are capture for human consumption, predation by introduced trout, pollution from mining, agriculture and human waste, and water fluctuations caused by the Upamayo Dam. These factors have also contributed to the decline of the native Orestias pupfish, historically an important part of the diet of the frog, but not recorded in a recent study of its diet. Although not yet detected in T. macrostomus, some of its relatives have strongly declined due to diseases like chytridiomycosis and Ranavirus. Mass deaths have occurred in T. macrostomus, with a particular large one in 1996, but the reason for this is unknown.

Much of its range is within reserves, but protection is insufficient. Local and national groups, partially funded internationally, have started monitoring and conservation projects for this species, and education for the people living in its range. In 2008, an experimental captive breeding program was initiated at two centers at Lake Junin and it resulted in a few thousand tadpoles, but this project ceased in 2012. Following progress and success with the captive breeding program for the related Titicaca water frog, it is planned to expand it to the Junin species at Huachipa Zoo in Lima.

== See also ==
- Goliath frog (Conraua goliath) – the world's largest frog from Africa
- Helmeted water toad (Calyptocephalella gayi) – a very large aquatic to semi-aquatic species from Chile
