= Lake Lejiacocha =

Lake in Peru

- Location within Peru
- Location: Peru; Ancash Region
- Coordinates: 9°17′09″S 77°30′20″W
- Surface elevation: 4,706 m (15,440 ft)

Lejiacocha (possibly from Quechua lliklla a rectangular shoulder cloth, qucha lake,) is a lake in the Cordillera Blanca in the Andes of Peru at 4,706 metres (15,440 ft) of elevation. It is located in Marcará District, Carhuaz Province, Ancash. Lejiacocha lies south-west of mount Copa.

Legiamayo River originates nearby the lake.
