= Tinco District =

Tinco Tinku
- District
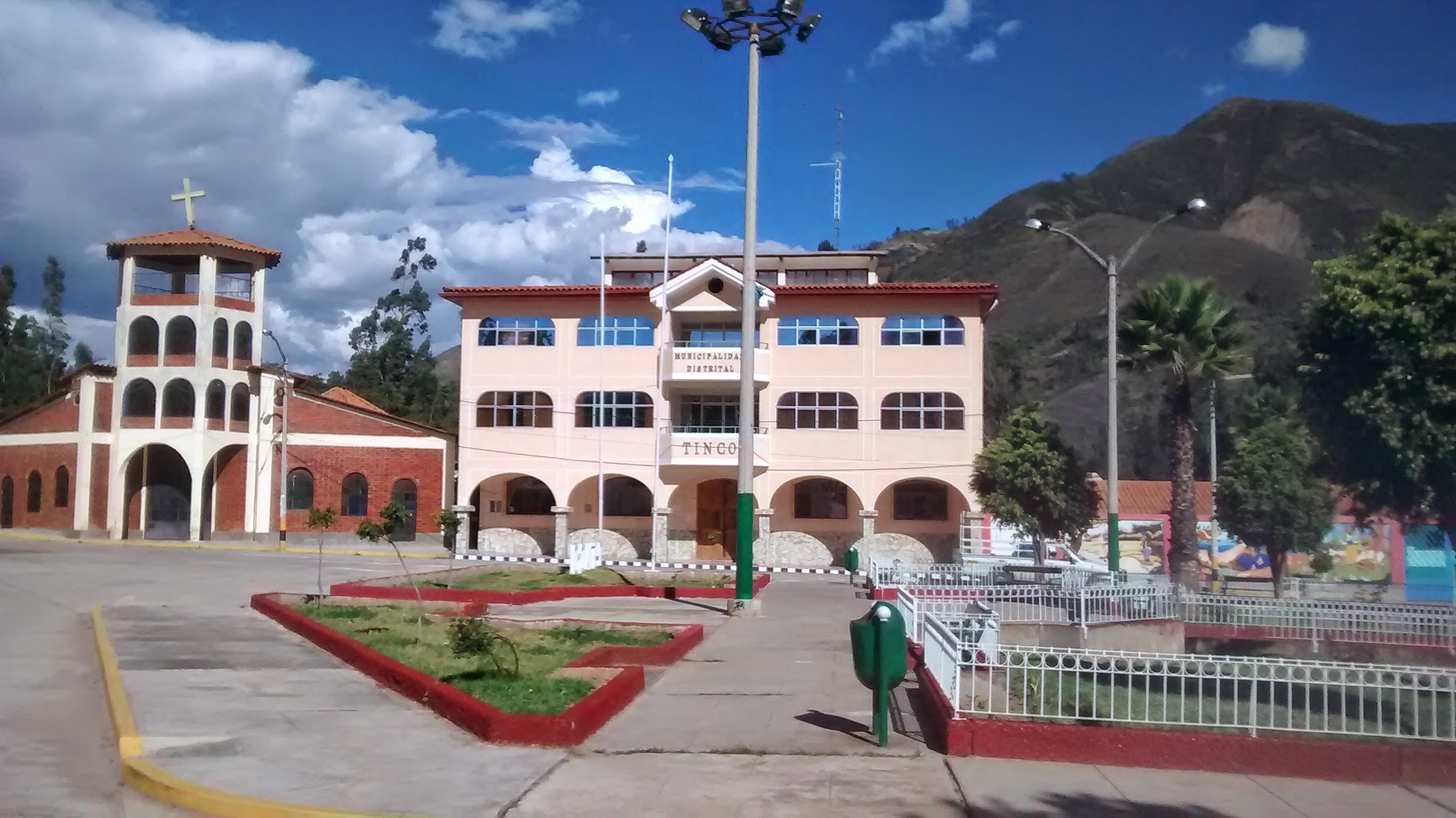
- Tinco

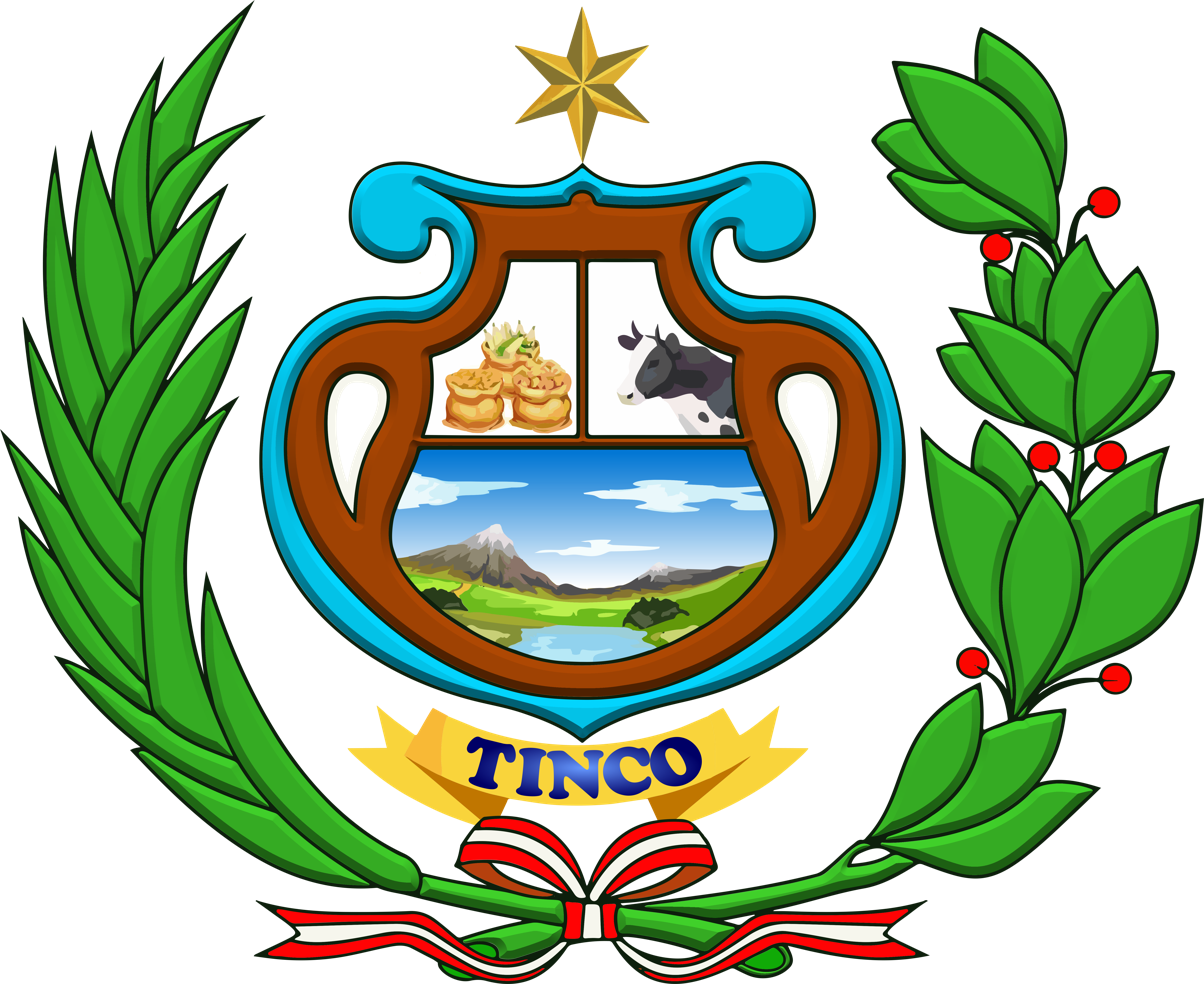
- Flag Coat of arms

- Location within Peru
- Coordinates: 9°16′14.56″S 77°40′40.22″W
- Country: Peru
- Region: Ancash
- Province: Carhuaz
- Founded: September 30, 1941
- Capital: Tinco

Government
  - Mayor: Agripino Rusbany Cochachin Minaya (2019-2022)

Area
  - Total: 15.44 km^{2} (5.96 sq mi)
- Elevation: 2,588 m (8,491 ft)

Population (2005 census)
  - Total: 3,145
  - Density: 203.7/km^{2} (527.6/sq mi)
- Time zone: UTC-5 (PET)
- UBIGEO: 020610

Tinco District is one of eleven districts of the province Carhuaz in Peru.
