= Yanaqucha (Junín) =

Lake in the Junin Province of Peru

- Location within Peru
- Location: Junín Region, Junín Province, Carhuamayo District
- Coordinates: 10°51′40″S 75°59′25″W
- Basin countries: Peru

Yanaqucha (Quechua yana black, very dark, qucha lake, "black lake", hispanicized spelling Yanacocha) is a lake in the north of the Carhuamayo District, north of the mountain Yanahirka (Quechua for "black mountain", hispanicized Yanajirca) in Junín Province, Junín Region, Peru.

== See also ==
- List of lakes in Peru
