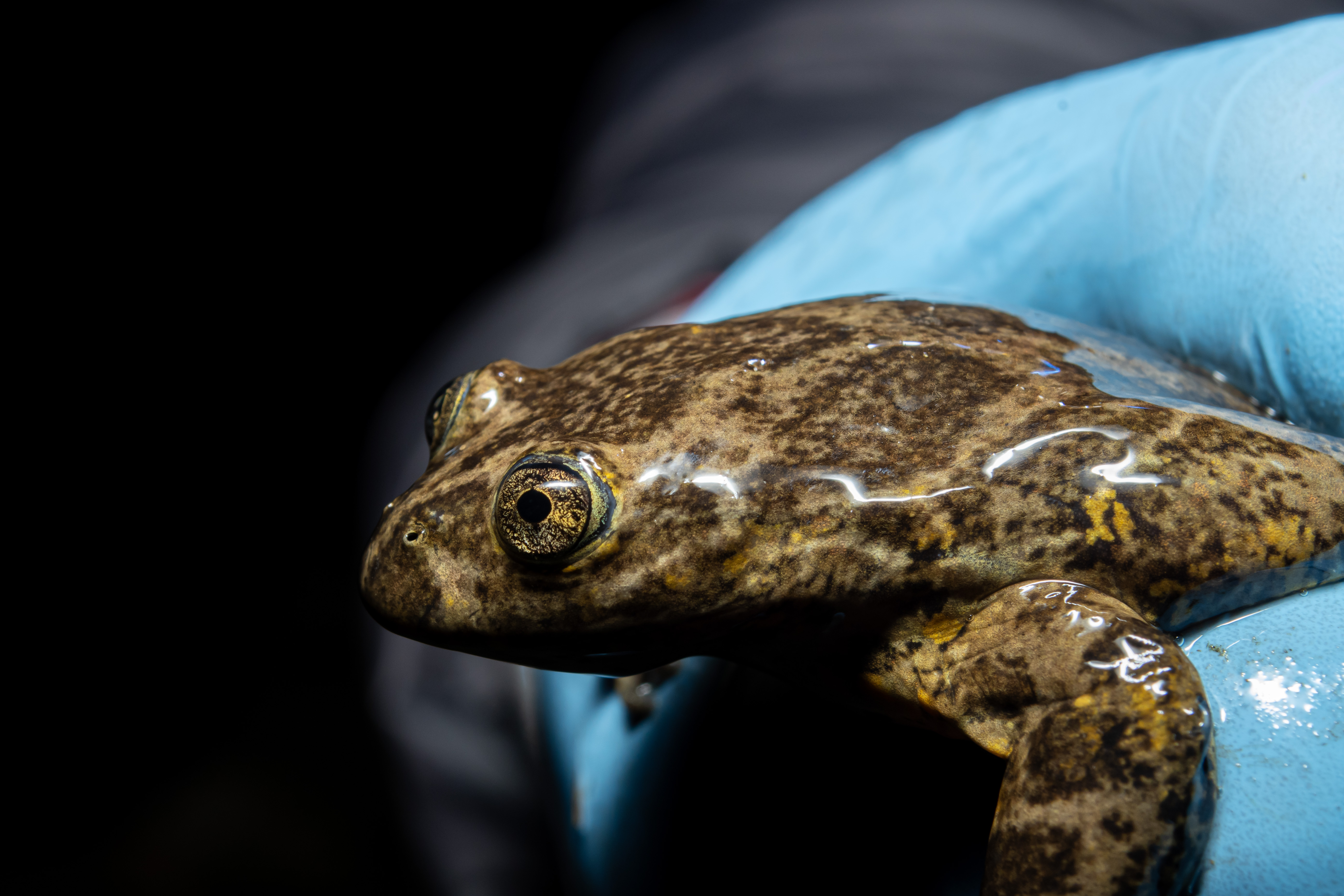

Conservation status
- Endangered (IUCN 3.1)

Scientific classification
- Kingdom: Animalia
- Phylum: Chordata
- Class: Amphibia
- Order: Anura
- Family: Telmatobiidae
- Genus: Telmatobius
- Species: T. brachydactylus

Binomial name
- Telmatobius brachydactylus (Peters, 1873)

Synonyms
- Batrachophrynus brachydactylus Peters, 1873

= Telmatobius brachydactylus =

Species of amphibian

Telmatobius brachydactylus, the Junín riparian frog or Amable Maria frog, is an endangered species of frog in the family Telmatobiidae.

== Body ==
Although a fairly large species with a typical snout-vent length of 5.8–7.3 cm (2.3–2.9 in) and weight of 25–55 g (0.88–1.94 oz), it is significantly smaller than the closely related and equally threatened Lake Junin frog (T. macrostomus). These two are sometimes placed in the genus Batrachophrynus.

== Habitat ==
This highly aquatic frog is endemic to tributaries of Lake Junín (not in the lake itself) in central Peru and to other nearby waterways, where it is found at altitudes of 4,000–6,000 m (13,000–20,000 ft). This frog reproduces through larval development.

Scientists have seen the frog in Junin National Reserve.

== Threats ==
Both the IUCN and organizations within Peru classify this frog as endangered. Principal threats include habitat loss in favor of human resource collection and agriculture, pollution, climate change, and predation by introduced species, such as trout. People allow livestock to drink and graze in and around the streams where the frog lives, which disrupts vegetation. Frogs that live in canals are threatened by the cleaning processes, which include plant removal, that keep the canals navigable. Scientists note that this frog is captured for human consumption and consider overexploitation a possible threat, but this has yet to be confirmed. Scientists also consider the fungal disease chytridiomycosis a possible threat, but they have yet to detect the fungus Batrachochytrium dendrobatidis on this species.

This species has been monitored by the High-Andean Frog Conservation through Capacity-Building Program, funded through the USAID Small Project Assistant Grant program.
