= Amashca District =

Coordinates: 9°13′59″S 77°39′00″W

Amashca
- District
- Interactive map of Amashca
- Country: Peru
- Region: Ancash
- Province: Carhuaz
- Founded: December 14, 1941
- Capital: Amashca

Government
  - Mayor: Leoncio Jaime Cadillo Chapeton

Area
  - Total: 11.99 km^{2} (4.63 sq mi)
- Elevation: 2,850 m (9,350 ft)

Population (2005 census)
  - Total: 1,745
  - Density: 145.5/km^{2} (376.9/sq mi)
- Time zone: UTC-5 (PET)
- UBIGEO: 020603

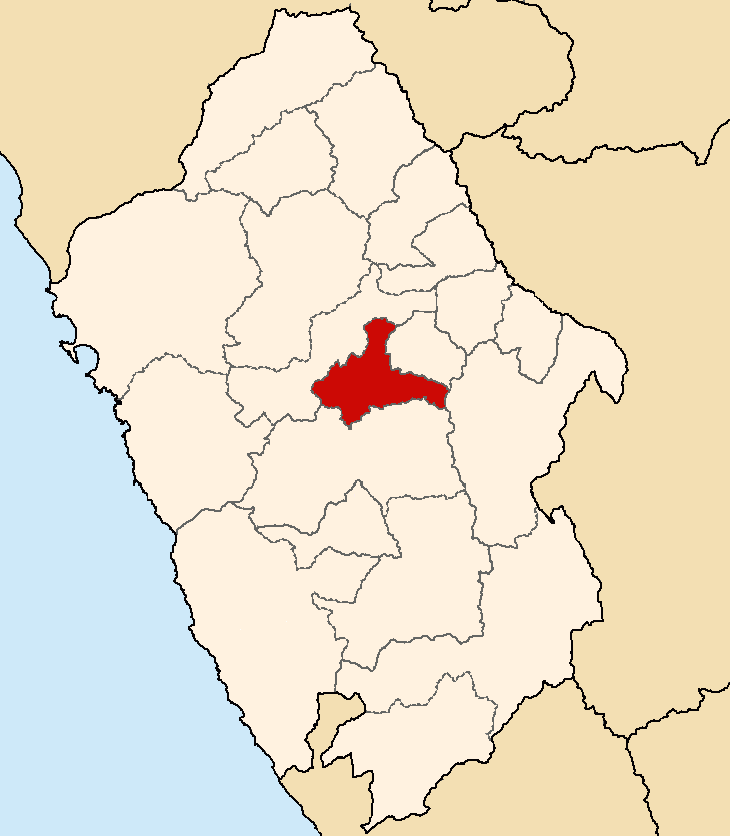
Location of the province Carhuaz in the Ancash region in Peru

Amashca District is one of eleven districts of the Carhuaz Province in Peru.

== Ethnic groups ==
The people in the district are mainly indigenous citizens of Quechua descent. Quechua is the language which the majority of the population (87.56%) learnt to speak in childhood, 12.25% of the residents started speaking using the Spanish language (2007 Peru Census).

== See also ==
- Ancash Quechua
