= Yungar District =

Coordinates: 9°22′01″S 77°36′00″W

Yungar
- District
- Interactive map of Yungar
- Country: Peru
- Region: Ancash
- Province: Carhuaz
- Founded: November 22, 1868
- Capital: Yungar

Government
  - Mayor: Julio Constantino Robles Ramirez

Area
  - Total: 46.43 km^{2} (17.93 sq mi)
- Elevation: 2,828 m (9,278 ft)

Population (2005 census)
  - Total: 3,181
  - Density: 68.51/km^{2} (177.4/sq mi)
- Time zone: UTC-5 (PET)
- UBIGEO: 020611
- Website: www.muniyungar.gob.pe

Yungar District is one of eleven districts of the province Carhuaz in Peru.

== Ethnic groups ==
The people in the district are mainly indigenous citizens of Quechua descent. Quechua is the language which the majority of the population (80.11%) learnt to speak in childhood, 19.73% of the residents started speaking using the Spanish language (2007 Peru Census).

== See also ==
- Ancash Quechua
