= Lake Allicocha =

Lake in Peru

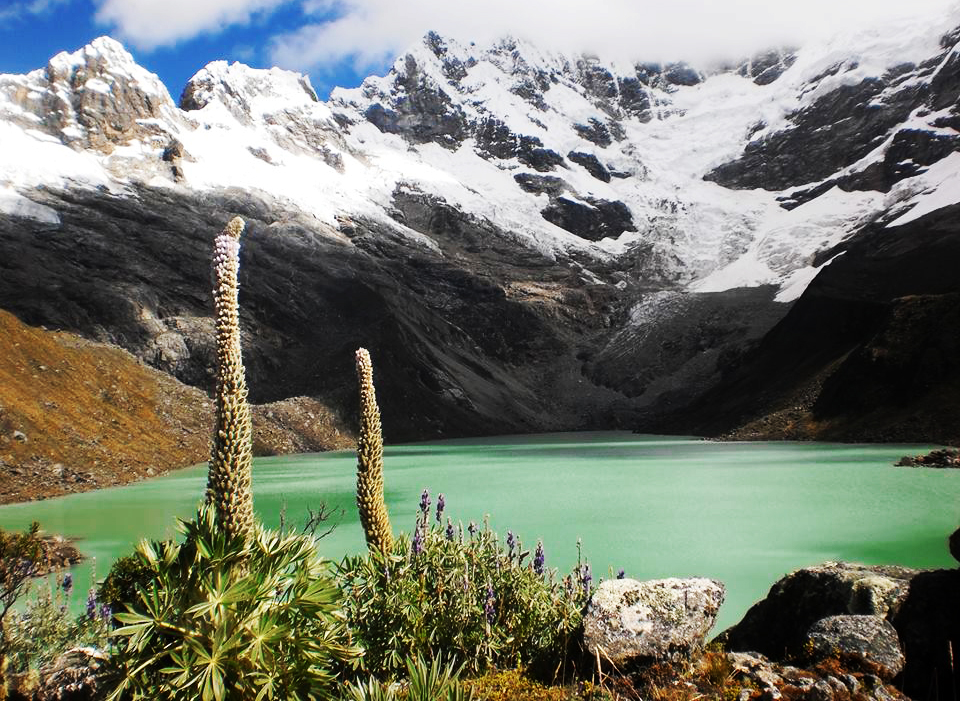
- Lake Allicocha

- Location within Peru
- Location: Ancash, Peru
- Coordinates: 9°15′03″S 77°27′33″W
- Max. length: 204 m (669 ft)
- Max. width: 113 m (371 ft)
- Surface elevation: 4,543 m (14,905 ft)

Lake Allicocha (possibly from Quechua alli good, sane, qucha lake, "good lake" or "sane lake") is a lake in the Cordillera Blanca in the Andes of Peru located in the Ancash Region, Asunción Province, Chacas District; at a height of 4,543 metres (14,905 ft), 204 m long and 113 m at its widest point. Lake Allicocha lies southwest of Copa.

The shore of the lake is covered with quenual trees (Polylepis sp.) and shrubs and herbs like: ichu (Jarava ichu), shunqu shunqu (Stangea erikae), botoncillo (Werneria dactylophylla), lleqllish qora (Werneria nubigena), warqu (Austrocylindropuntia flocossa), rima rima (Krapfia weberbaueri) and taulli macho (Lupinus weberbaueri).
