= Acopampa District =

Coordinates: 9°16′59″S 77°36′00″W

Acopampa Aqupampa
- District
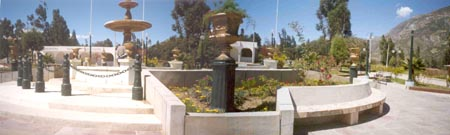
- Acobamba
- Interactive map of Acopampa; Aqupampa
- Country: Peru
- Region: Ancash
- Province: Carhuaz
- Founded: December 5, 1941
- Capital: Acopampa

Government
  - Mayor: Julian Victor Chavez Graza

Area
  - Total: 14.17 km^{2} (5.47 sq mi)
- Elevation: 2,725 m (8,940 ft)

Population (2005 census)
  - Total: 2,338
  - Density: 165.0/km^{2} (427.3/sq mi)
- Time zone: UTC-5 (PET)
- UBIGEO: 020602

Acopampa or Aqupampa (Quechua aqu sand, pampa large plain, "sand plain") is one of eleven districts of the province of Carhuaz in Peru.

== Ethnic groups ==
The people in the district are mainly indigenous citizens of Quechua descent. Quechua is the language which the majority of the population (54.21%) learnt to speak in childhood, 44.90% of the residents started speaking using the Spanish language (2007 Peru Census).

== See also ==
- Ancash Quechua
