= Anta District, Carhuaz =

Anta District
- District
- Location within Peru
- Coordinates: 9°15′S 78°03′W
- Country: Peru
- Region: Ancash
- Province: Carhuaz
- Founded: November 28, 1910
- Capital: Anta

Government
  - Mayor: Miguel Oswaldo Antunez Castillo

Area
  - Total: 40.77 km^{2} (15.74 sq mi)
- Elevation: 2,791 m (9,157 ft)

Population (2005 census)
  - Total: 2,424
  - Density: 59.46/km^{2} (154.0/sq mi)
- Time zone: UTC-5 (PET)
- UBIGEO: 020604

Anta (Quechua for "copper") is one of eleven districts of Carhuaz Province in Peru.

== Ethnic groups ==
The people in the district are mainly indigenous citizens of Quechua descent. Quechua is the language which the majority of the population (67.24%) learnt to speak in childhood, 32.53% of the residents started speaking using the Spanish language (2007 Peru Census).

== See also ==
- Ancash Quechua
