= Comandante FAP Germán Arias Graziani Airport =

Airport in Peru

Comandante FAP Germán Arias Graziani Airport Anta-Huaraz/Huascaran Airport
- German Arias Graziani Airport in 2026
- IATA: ATA; ICAO: SPHZ

Summary
- Airport type: Public
- Operator: ADP
- Serves: Huaraz
- Location: Anta, Peru
- Elevation AMSL: 9,097 ft (2,773 m)
- Coordinates: 9°20′50″S 77°35′55″W

Map
- Location of the airport in Peru

Runways
Direction	Length		Surface
Direction	m	ft	Surface
16/34	3,050	10,007	Asphalt
- Sources: GCM Google Maps

Comandante FAP Germán Arias Graziani Airport (IATA: ATA, ICAO: SPHZ) is a regional airport serving the city of Huaraz, Ancash Region, Peru. The airport is in the Santa River valley, 20 kilometres (12 mi) northwest of Huaraz, at the village of Anta. Since July 2024, the airport reopened its operations to commercial flights, after the improvement of the terminal and the runway, receiving daily flights operated by LATAM Airlines to the city of Lima.

The Anta-Huaraz non-directional beacon (ident: ATA) is located on the field.

== Airlines and destinations ==
Airlines	Destinations
LATAM Perú	Lima

== Transport ==
The airport is accessible by road from Huaraz in a 40-minute drive.

The terminal has an airport shuttle service operated by Aeroexpreso to the center of the city of Huaraz.

== See also ==
- Transport in Peru
- List of airports in Peru
