= Junín, Peru =

City in Peru

Coordinates: 11°09′S 75°59′W

Junín
- City
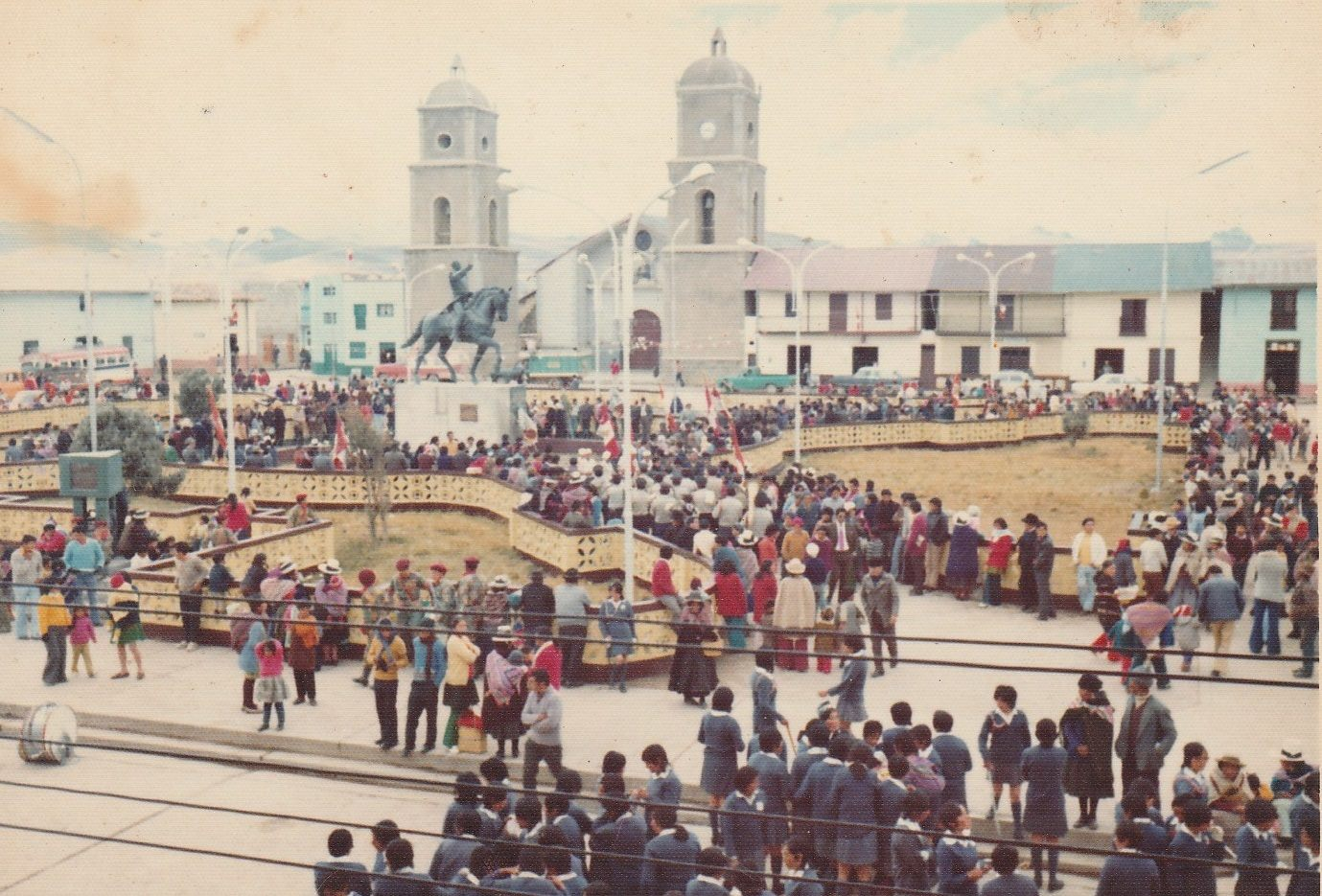

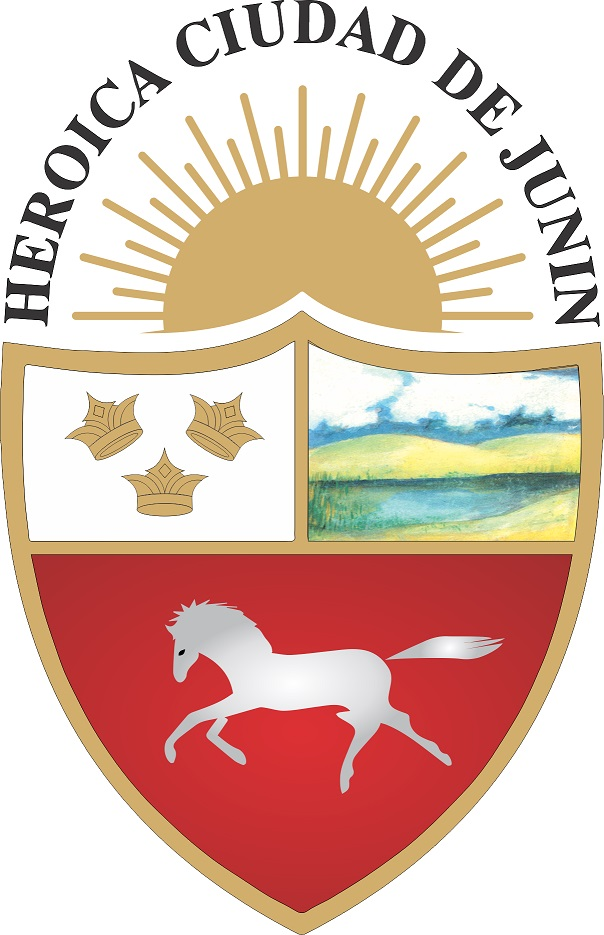
- Seal
- Nickname: Heroica Ciudad de Junín (Heroic City of Junín)
- Interactive map of Junín
- Country: Peru
- Region: Junín
- Province: Junín
- District: Junín

Government
  - Mayor: Jorge Luis Tejeda Pucuhuaranga
- Elevation: 4,107 m (13,474 ft)

Population (2017)
  - Total: 10,976
- Time zone: UTC-5 (PET)

Junín is a city in Central Peru, capital of the Junín Province in the Department of Junín. It is located on the southern shore of Lake Junín, at an elevation of 4,107 m (13,474 ft). It was founded as Town of Kings in 1539 and elevated to city level by the Law No. 9834, on October 27, 1943, during the presidency of Manuel Prado Ugarteche.

Raúl Pacheco and Gladys Tejeda, both Olympic marathon runners, were born here.

== Climate ==
Climate data for Junin, elevation 4,101 m (13,455 ft), (1991–2020)
Month	Jan	Feb	Mar	Apr	May	Jun	Jul	Aug	Sep	Oct	Nov	Dec	Year
Mean daily maximum °C (°F)	12.6 (54.7)	12.3 (54.1)	12.2 (54.0)	12.6 (54.7)	13.0 (55.4)	12.9 (55.2)	12.9 (55.2)	13.5 (56.3)	13.1 (55.6)	13.1 (55.6)	13.6 (56.5)	12.7 (54.9)	12.9 (55.2)
Mean daily minimum °C (°F)	2.5 (36.5)	2.7 (36.9)	2.8 (37.0)	1.3 (34.3)	−0.3 (31.5)	−2.6 (27.3)	−3.9 (25.0)	−3.3 (26.1)	−1.1 (30.0)	0.4 (32.7)	0.6 (33.1)	1.8 (35.2)	0.1 (32.1)
Average precipitation mm (inches)	138.7 (5.46)	147.7 (5.81)	121.2 (4.77)	64.9 (2.56)	39.4 (1.55)	14.8 (0.58)	14.2 (0.56)	14.1 (0.56)	40.1 (1.58)	82.4 (3.24)	75.3 (2.96)	136.6 (5.38)	889.4 (35.01)
Source: National Meteorology and Hydrology Service of Peru
