= Waqraqucha (Junín) =

Lake in Peru

- Location within Peru
- Location: Junín Region, Junín Province
- Coordinates: 11°16′35″S 76°09′41.1″W
- Basin countries: Peru

Waqraqucha Dam
- Location within Peru

Dam and spillways
- Height: 6.5 m (21 ft)

Power Station
- Operator: Electroperu

Waqraqucha (Quechua waqra horn, qucha lake, lagoon, "horn lake", hispanicized names Huacracocha, Laguna Huacra) is a lake in Peru located in the Junín Region, Junín Province, Junín District. It belongs to the watershed of the Mantaro River.

In 2000 the Waqraqucha dam was erected at the western end of the lake at 11°16′29.7″S 76°02′14.9″W. It is 6.5 m (21 ft) high. It is operated by Electroperu.
