= Anta, Ancash =

Anta Anta
- Location within Peru
- Coordinates: 09°22′00″S 77°36′00″W
- Country: Peru
- Region: Ancash Region
- Province: Carhuaz Province
- District: Anta District
- Elevation: 2,600 m (8,500 ft)
- Time zone: UTC-5 (PET)
  - Summer (DST): not observed

Anta is a small village in Anta District, Carhuaz Province, Ancash Region, Peru. It is the district's capital, and lies 9.1 km to the north of the village of Quillo.

== Transportation ==
The village is home to the airport serving the regional capital of Huaraz, Huaraz Province, which is on the Santa River 23 kilometres (14 mi) to the southeast. Comandante FAP Germán Arias Graziani Airport is north of the village and has scheduled service from domestic carrier LC Perú to the international airport in Lima, the national capital. Following the May 31, 1970, earthquake and the resulting avalanche, the airport was created by the U.S. Air Force in June 1970. It was decided that the dirt road going through Anta would be the best site for possible landings so Ssgt Richard Eubanks and Sgt Leonard Holmes (both Combat Controllers) deployed to Anta and began work to convert that dirt road into a runway that would eventually become the Anta Airport.

In the aftermath of the May 31, 1970, earthquake, the 39th Tactical Airlift Squadron on rotational duty at Howard AFB, Canal Zone sent C-130's to Lima to support the relief efforts. Upon arriving at Lima Colonel Beckett (the squadron commander), Ssgt Eubanks and Sgt Holmes, Mrs. Consuelo de Velasco (Peru's first lady) and US Ambassador Taylor Belcher flew over the disaster area to survey the damage and determine the best method to reach the area.

The 39th Tactical Airlift Squadron published this booklet about the mission;

https://photos.google.com/u/1/share/AF1QipNwWLfxDkpQfTATU1MOX_O8PohU2JpGUFp9bBe3IOVBwSSHAB2VPUNrDsyB6jxlzQ?key=UkNsX0F5anVOTl9nY3hPamtxM0RXanhSSFpCREJ3
