= Antacocha (Junín) =

Lake in Junin Province, Peru

- Location within Peru
- Location: Junín Region, Junín Province, Junín District
- Coordinates: 11°01′29″S 75°56′42″W
- Basin countries: Peru
- Surface elevation: 4,247 m (13,934 ft)

Antacocha (possibly from Quechua anta copper, qucha lake, "copper lake") is a lake in Peru located in the Junín Region, Junín Province, Junín District. It lies east of Lake Junin and northwest of Alcacocha at an elevation of 4,247 metres (13,934 ft)

== See also ==
- List of lakes in Peru
