= Ondores District =

Coordinates: 11.0870°S 76.1481°W

Ondores
- District
- Interactive map of Ondores
- Country: Peru
- Region: Junín
- Province: Junín
- Founded: November 27, 1944
- Capital: Ondores

Government
  - Mayor: Dario Valerio Apelo

Area
  - Total: 254.46 km^{2} (98.25 sq mi)
- Elevation: 4,100 m (13,500 ft)

Population (2005 census)
  - Total: 1,984
  - Density: 7.797/km^{2} (20.19/sq mi)
- Time zone: UTC-5 (PET)
- UBIGEO: 120503

Ondores District is one of four districts of the province Junín in Peru.

== See also ==
- Upamayu Dam
