= Junín province =

Coordinates: 11°09′S 75°59′W

Junín
- Province
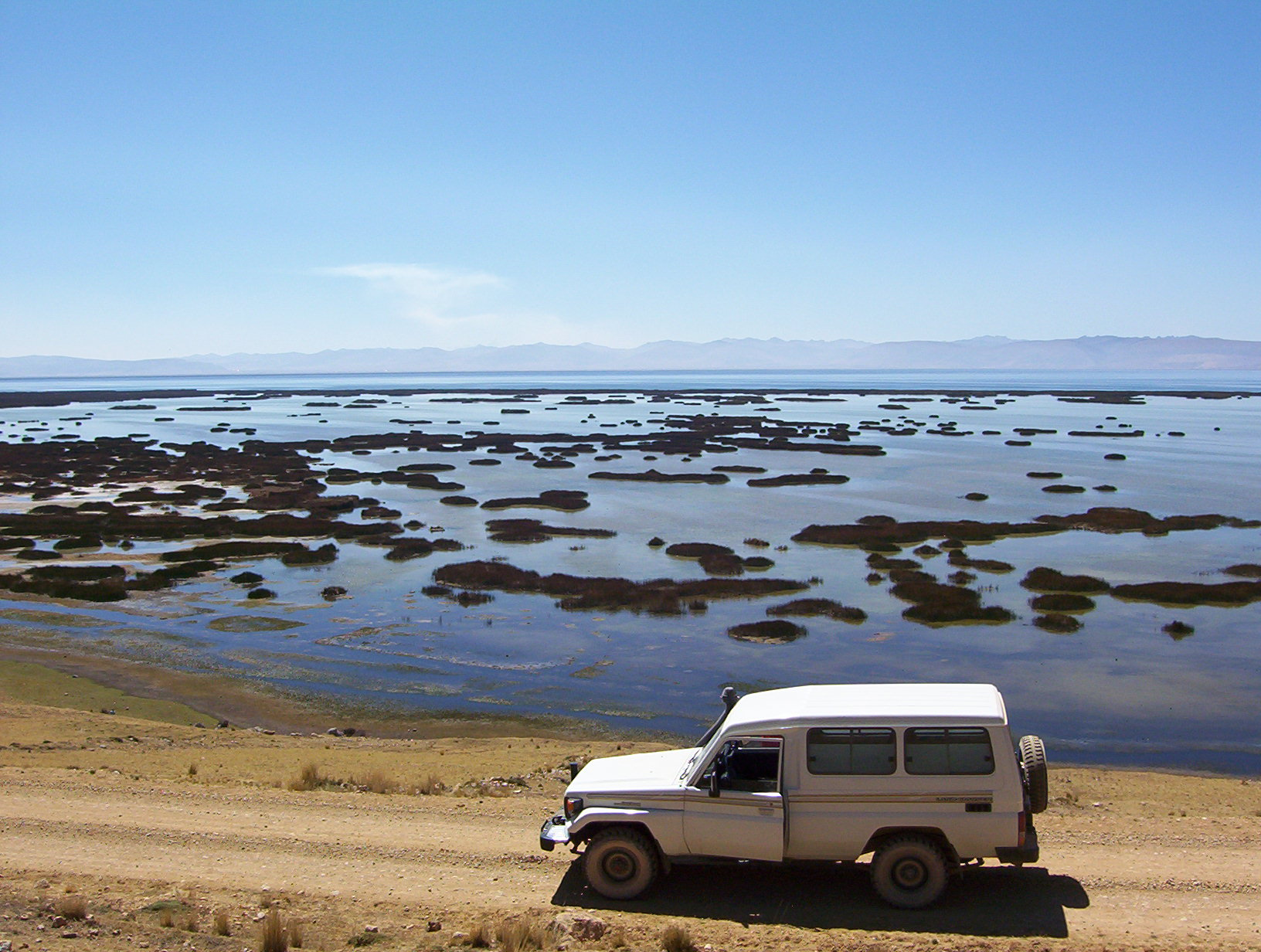
- Junín Lake

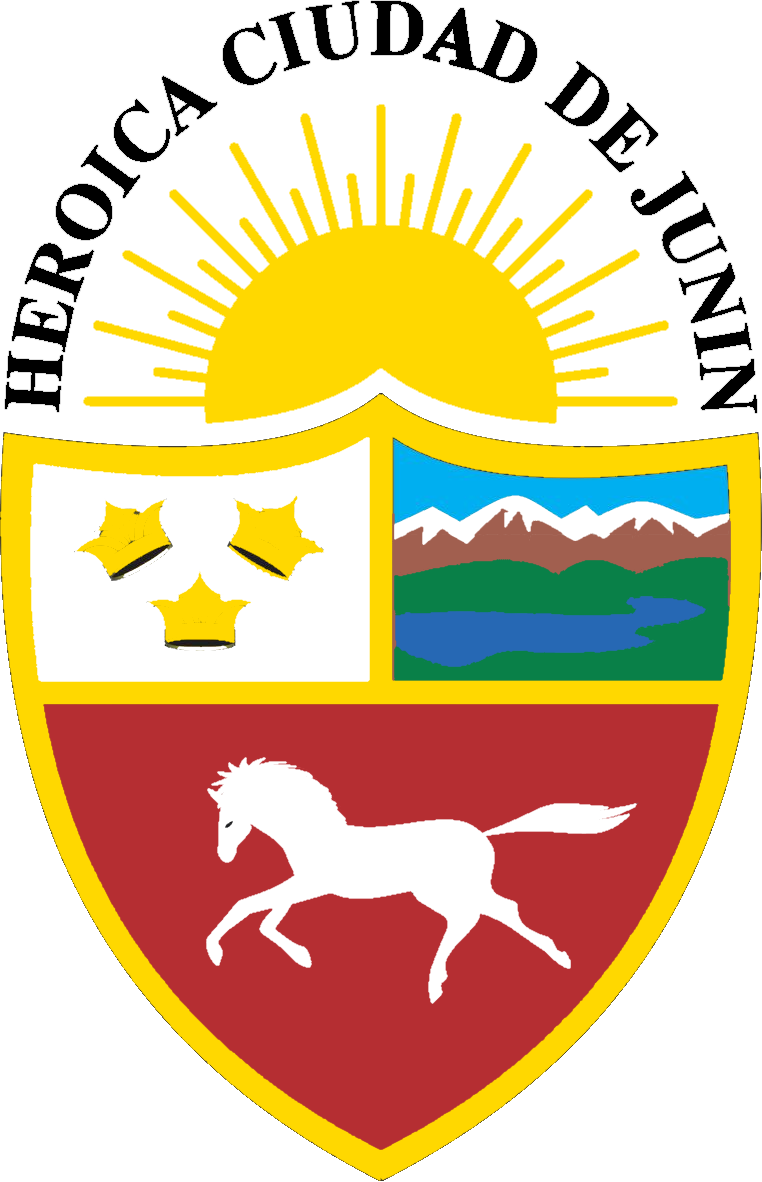
- Coat of arms

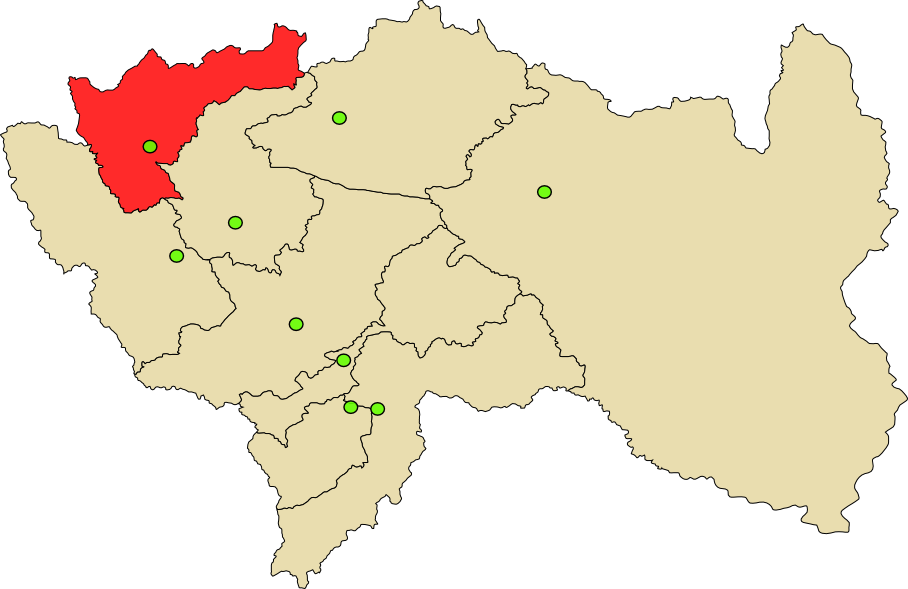
- Location of Junín in the Junín Region
- Country: Peru
- Region: Junín
- Capital: Junín

Government
  - Mayor: Jorge Luis Tejeda Pucuhuaranga

Area
  - Total: 2,360.07 km^{2} (911.23 sq mi)

Population
  - Total: 23,133
  - Density: 9.8018/km^{2} (25.387/sq mi)

Junín is a province in northwestern Junín Region, in the central highlands of Peru. Its capital is the city of Junín.

== Geography ==
The territory of the province is mountainous and it includes Lake Junin which is the largest lake entirely on Peruvian territory, and the second-largest lake in the country after Lake Titicaca. Some of the most important rivers are the Mantaro and the Ullkumayu (Ulcomayo).

== Boundaries ==
The province borders the province of Tarma on the southeast, the province of Yauli on the southwest, and the Pasco Region provinces of Pasco on the north and northwest, and Oxapampa on the northeast.

== Political division ==
The province of Junín is divided into four districts (Spanish: distritos, singular: distrito), each of which is headed by a mayor (alcalde):

- Junín in the south
- Carhuamayo in the north
- Ondores in the west
- Ulcumayo in the east

== Floods ==
Flooding caused by heavy rains has often caused river to overflow, triggering floods. Recent floods include those in 2019 and 2021.

== See also ==
- Antaqucha
- Allqaqucha
- Chacamarca Historical Sanctuary
- Chiqllaqucha
- Upamayu Dam
- Waqraqucha
- Yanaqucha
