= Ataquero District =

Coordinates: 9°15′00″S 77°43′01″W

Ataquero
- District
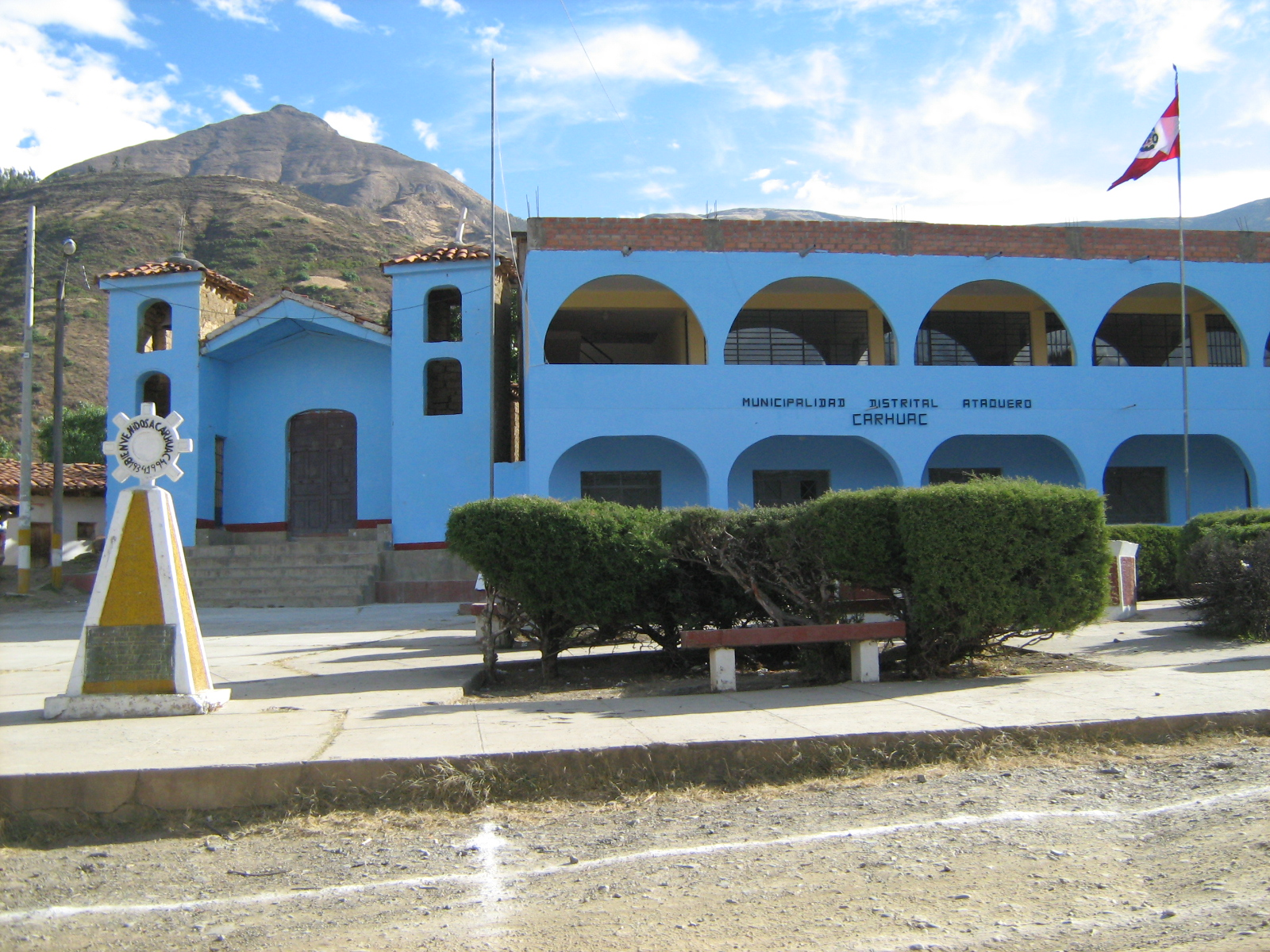
- Interactive map of Ataquero
- Country: Peru
- Region: Ancash
- Province: Carhuaz
- Founded: December 14, 1934
- Capital: Carhuac

Government
  - Mayor: Fermín Jaime Gutiérrez Mendoza (2019–2022)

Area
  - Total: 47.22 km^{2} (18.23 sq mi)
- Elevation: 2,719 m (8,921 ft)

Population (2017)
  - Total: 1,469
  - Density: 31.11/km^{2} (80.57/sq mi)
- Time zone: UTC-5 (PET)
- UBIGEO: 020605

Ataquero District is one of eleven districts of the Carhuaz Province in Peru.

== Ethnic groups ==
The people in the district are mainly indigenous citizens of Quechua descent. Quechua is the language which the majority of the population (87.77%) learnt to speak in childhood, 12.16% of the residents started speaking using the Spanish language (2007 Peru Census).

== See also ==
- Ancash Quechua
