= Ulcumayo District =

Coordinates: 10.9676°S 75.8787°W

Ulcumayo Ullqu Mayu
- District
- Interactive map of Ulcumayo
- Country: Peru
- Region: Junín
- Province: Junín
- Founded: October 26, 1926
- Capital: Ulcumayo

Government
  - Mayor: Edson Fernando Huamali Paita

Area
  - Total: 1,002.13 km^{2} (386.92 sq mi)
- Elevation: 3,600 m (11,800 ft)

Population (2005 census)
  - Total: 8,927
  - Density: 8.908/km^{2} (23.07/sq mi)
- Time zone: UTC-5 (PET)
- UBIGEO: 120504

Ulcumayo (from local Quechua Ullqu Mayu or Ullqumayu, "male river") is one of four districts of the Junín Province in Peru.

== Geography ==
One of the highest peaks of the district is Ullqu Mayu at approximately 4,800 m (15,700 ft). Other mountains are listed below:

- Anta P'itiq
- Añil Qucha Punta
- Awki Punta
- Challwa Qucha
- Hatun Pampa
- Hatun Punta
- Hatun Q'asa
- Hatun Raqra
- Kapilla Mach'ay
- Kushuru Punta
- Khuchi Wañusqa
- Llañu Pampa
- Mach'ayniyuq
- Maraq Chupan
- Marka Punta
- Maswa Pata
- Misa Pata
- Nina Marka
- Ñawin Punta
- Pakay Tampu
- Parya Kancha
- Pichana
- Pirwa
- Puka Qucha
- Putaqa
- Qanchis Qucha
- Qucha Pata
- Quqanniyuq
- Q'ara Kancha
- Rikachakuna
- Silla Pata
- Sima Qucha
- Suyru Qucha
- Tanka Chuku
- Tawrin
- Tuku P'ukun
- Ututu
- Warkhu
- Yana Punta
- Yuraq Qaqa

The Ullqu Mayu is the most important river of the district.
