= Pariahuanca District, Carhuaz =

Coordinates: 9°22′01″S 77°34′59″W

Pariahuanca Paryawanka
- District
- Interactive map of Pariahuanca
- Country: Peru
- Region: Ancash
- Province: Carhuaz
- Founded: October 6, 1905
- Capital: Pariahuanca

Government
  - Mayor: Zenobio Gregorio Mendez Aguirre

Area
  - Total: 11.74 km^{2} (4.53 sq mi)
- Elevation: 2,811 m (9,222 ft)

Population (2017)
  - Total: 1,381
  - Density: 117.6/km^{2} (304.7/sq mi)
- Time zone: UTC-5 (PET)
- UBIGEO: 020607

Pariahuanca District is one of eleven districts of the Carhuaz Province in Peru.

== Ethnic groups ==
The people in the district are mainly indigenous citizens of Quechua descent. Quechua is the language which the majority of the population (72.88%) learnt to speak in childhood, 26.98% of the residents started speaking using the Spanish language (2007 Peru Census).

== See also ==
- Ancash Quechua
