= Upamayo Dam =

- Location within Peru
- Country: Peru
- Location: Junín Region, Pasco Region
- Coordinates: 10°55′22″S 76°16′39″W
- Status: Operational
- Opening date: 1936

Dam and spillways
- Impounds: Upamayo River
- Height: 10 m (33 ft)
- Length: 96 m (315 ft)

Reservoir
- Total capacity: 556,000,000 m^{3} (451,000 acre⋅ft)

The Upamayo Dam (possibly from Quechua upa calm, silent; mute, mayu river) is a dam at Lake Junin, the largest lake entirely in Peru. It is located on the border of the Junín Region, Junín Province, Ondores District, and the Pasco Region, Pasco Province, Vicco District.

The dam was erected in 1936. It is 10 m (33 ft) high and 96 m (105 yd) long. It is operated by Centromín Perú. The reservoir has a capacity of 556,000,000 m^{3} (451,000 acre⋅ft).
