= Lake Junin =

Lake in Peru

- Chinchaycocha
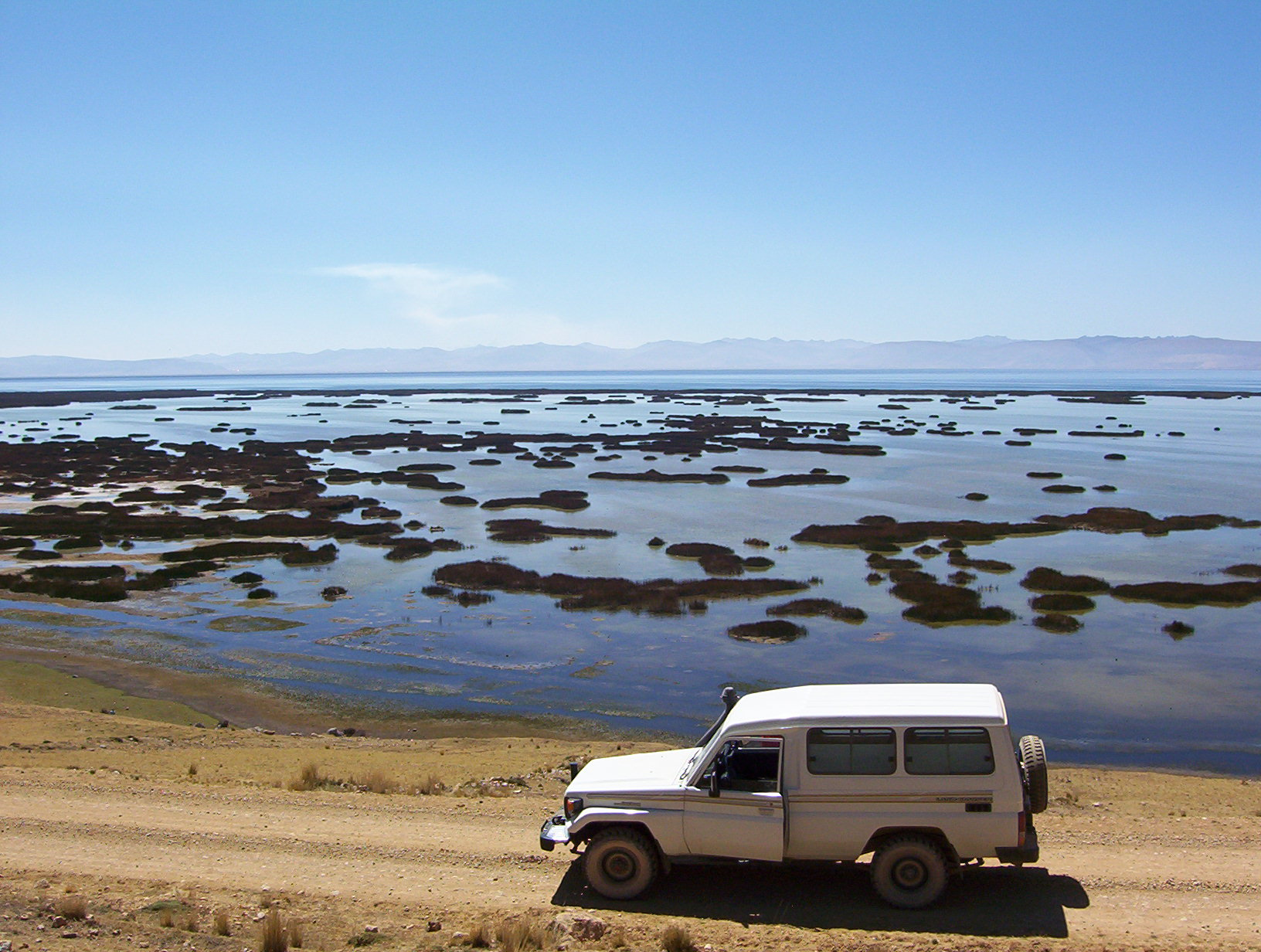

- Location within Peru
- Coordinates: 11°01′S 76°07′W
- Primary outflows: Upamayu-Mantaro River
- Basin countries: Peru
- Surface area: 529.88 km^{2} (204.59 mi^{2})
- Max. depth: 12 m (39 ft)
- Surface elevation: 4,082.7 m (13,395 ft)

Lake Junin (IPA: [xuˈnin]; Spanish Lago Junín, named after the nearby town of Junin) or Chinchaycocha (possibly from Quechua chincha, chinchay north, northern, chinchay ocelot, qucha lake, lagoon, "northern lake" or "ocelot lake") is the largest lake entirely within Peruvian territory. Even though Lake Titicaca has a much larger area, its eastern half is located on Bolivian territory. Lake Junin is an important birdwatching destination in the country.

== Geography ==
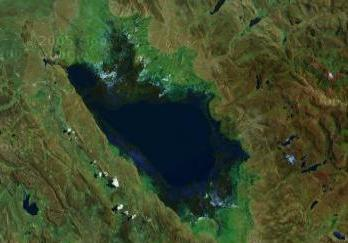
Lake Junin in a satellite image.

Lake Junin is located in the Andean highlands of central Peru. Most of the lake is in the Junin Province of the Junin Region, but its northwestern tip belongs to the Pasco Province of the Pasco Region. The surface elevation of the lake is located at 4,082.7 m (13,395 ft) above sea level.

The lake is on the upper reaches of the Mantaro River within the Amazon basin. There is a hydroelectric power station which regulates the water level of the lake at the outflow of the lake, through the Upamayo Dam. In years of abundant rains, fluctuations in the water level are moderate, but in years of drought water level may drop 1.5–2 m (4.9–6.6 ft) leaving extensive areas exposed. The deepest part of the lake, which is located about 10 kilometres (6.2 mi) off Huayre, is 12 m (39 ft) deep.

The headwaters of streams flowing into Lake Junin have been named as the "most distant" source of the Amazon River, one of the three places proposed as the "true" source of the Amazon.

== Pollution ==
Since 1933 there has been an inflow of mining residues into the lake, which has adversely affected the fish and bird fauna in parts of the lake. Sewage coming from the towns of Junin and Carhuamayo also pollutes the lake. These types of pollution are contributing to the natural eutrophication process of this wetland.

== Fauna and flora ==
Lake Junin is home to three endemic birds that all are seriously threatened: the Junin rail (Laterallus (jamaicensis) tuerosi), the Junin grebe (Podiceps taczanowskii) and the Junin white-tufted grebe (Rollandia rolland morrisoni). Two endangered species of frogs in the genus Telmatobius are restricted to the vicinity of the lake, although only one of these, the entirely aquatic Lake Junin frog (T. macrostomus), is found in the lake itself, whereas the Amable Maria frog (T. brachydactylus) is found nearby. Three Orestias pupfish, O. empyraeus, O. gymnota and O. polonorum, and the catfish Trichomycterus oroyae are endemic to the lake basin and its vicinity (including associated streams, rivers and smaller lakes).

Lake Junin is surrounded by emergent vegetation, which in some places can reach 6 km (3.7 mi) wide and become so dense that it is impenetrable. The fish fauna is abundant but consists of few species, including introduced species. The introduced trout have been implicated in the decline of the endemic frogs.

== See also ==
- Antaqucha
- Allqaqucha
