= Carhuaz District =

Coordinates: 9°04′01″S 77°49′01″W

Carhuaz Qarwa
- District
- Flag Coat of arms
- Interactive map of Carhuaz
- Country: Peru
- Region: Ancash
- Province: Carhuaz
- Capital: Carhuaz

Government
  - Mayor: Oscar Roosevelt Cerna Gomez

Area
  - Total: 194.62 km^{2} (75.14 sq mi)
- Elevation: 2,638 m (8,655 ft)

Population (2005 census)
  - Total: 13,615
  - Density: 69.957/km^{2} (181.19/sq mi)
- Time zone: UTC-5 (PET)
- UBIGEO: 020601

Carhuaz District is one of eleven districts of the Carhuaz Province in the Ancash Region of Peru. Its seat is Carhuaz.

== Ethnic groups ==
The people in the district are mainly indigenous citizens of Quechua descent. Quechua is the language which the majority of the population (67.23%) learnt to speak in childhood, 32.60% of the residents started speaking using the Spanish language (2007 Peru Census).

== See also ==
- Ancash Quechua
