= Chequiaraju =

Mountain in Peru

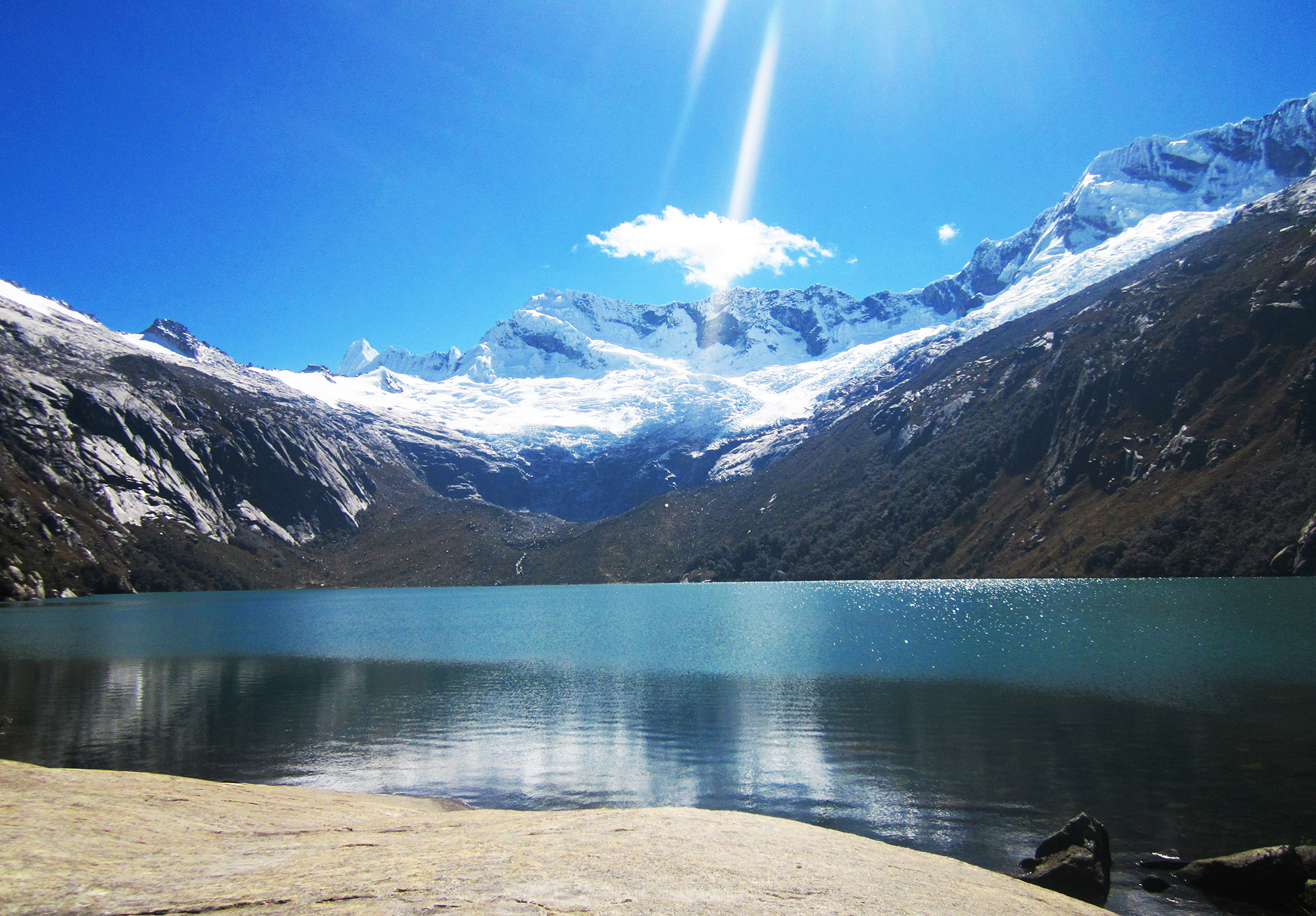

Highest point
- Elevation: 5,286 m (17,343 ft)
- Coordinates: 9°10′19″S 77°33′29″W

Geography
- Location within Peru
- Location: Ancash, Peru
- Parent range: Andes, Cordillera Blanca

Climbing
- First ascent: 1-1958 via N. side: E. side-1960: S.W. ridge-1971: S. side-1977: W. ridge & traverse over P.5130 to Pariaqaqa-1977.

Chequiaraju, Chequiarajo, or Checquiacraju (possibly from Quechua, chiqlla green, rahu snow, ice, mountain with snow) is a mountain in the Cordillera Blanca in the Andes of Peru, about 5,286 metres (17,343 ft) high. It is situated in the Ancash Region, Carhuaz Province, Shilla District. Chequiaraju lies northwest of Hualcán and the lake Chiqllaqucha.
