= Lake Alcacocha (Junín) =

Lake in Junín, Peru

- Location within Peru
- Location: Peru; Junín Region
- Coordinates: 11°03′44″S 75°55′01″W
- Max. length: 3.16 km (1.96 mi)
- Max. width: 0.74 km (0.46 mi)
- Surface elevation: 4,359 m (14,301 ft)

Lake Alcacocha (possibly from Quechua allqa black-and-white qucha lake) is a lake in Peru located in the Junín Region, Junín Province, Junín District. It is situated at an elevation of about 4,349 metres (14,268 ft), about 3.16 km long and 0.74 km at its widest point. Alcacocha lies east of Lake Junín.

== See also ==
- Antaqucha
