= Carhuamayo District =

Coordinates: 10.9233°S 76.0565°W

Carhuamayo Qarwa Mayu
- District
- Interactive map of Carhuamayo
- Country: Peru
- Region: Junín
- Province: Junín
- Capital: Carhuamayo

Government
  - Mayor: Raul Pelayo Arias Arias

Area
  - Total: 219.68 km^{2} (84.82 sq mi)
- Elevation: 4,146 m (13,602 ft)

Population (2005 census)
  - Total: 8,061
  - Density: 36.69/km^{2} (95.04/sq mi)
- Time zone: UTC-5 (PET)
- UBIGEO: 120502

Carhuamayo (from Quechua Qarwa Mayu or Qarwamayu: qarwa yellowish, mayu river, "yellowish river") is one of four districts of the Junín Province in Peru.

== Geography ==
One of the highest peaks of the district is Yana Hirka at approximately 4,600 m (15,100 ft). Other mountains are listed below:

- Puka Shalla
- Rinri Uchku
- Runtunniyuq
- Sankhayuq
- Wanin Punta

== See also ==
- Yanaqucha
