= Hualcán =

Mountain in Peru

- Rajopaquinan
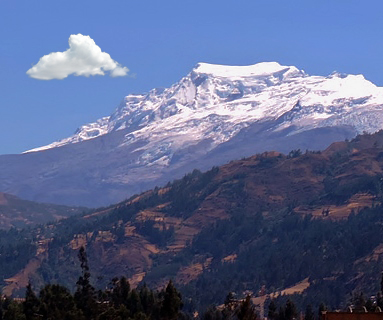

Highest point
- Elevation: 6,165 m (20,226 ft)
- Prominence: 2,912 m (9,554 ft)
- Parent peak: Huascaran
- Coordinates: 9°12′09.89″S 077°31′08.75″W

Geography
- Location within Peru
- Location: Ancash, Peru
- Parent range: Andes, Cordillera Blanca

Climbing
- First ascent: August 1939 via South Ridge by Karl Schmid and Siegfried Rohrer (Germany); S. flank-1979.

Hualcán (also called Rajopaquinan) (possibly from Quechua wallqa, walqa, -n a suffix) is a mountain in the Cordillera Blanca in the Andes of Peru, about 6,165 metres (20,226 ft) high. It is located in Ancash, between Chacas (in Asunción Province) and Carhuaz (Carhuaz Province) districts. Hualcán lies south-east of Chequiaraju. Its territory is within the Peruvian protection area of Huascarán National Park and it's on the border of two provinces: Asuncion and Carhuaz. Cities of Chacas and Carhuaz.

== First Ascent ==
Hualcan was first climbed by Karl Schmid and Siegfried Rohrer (Germany) in August 1939.

== Elevation ==
Other data from available digital elevation models: SRTM yields 6157 metres and ASTER 6157 metres. The height of the nearest key col is 3253 meters, leading to a topographic prominence of 2912 meters. Hualcan is considered a Mountain Sub-System according to the Dominance System and its dominance is 47.23%. Its parent peak is Huascaran Sur and the Topographic isolation is 13 kilometers.
