= Shilla District =

Coordinates: 9°13′59″S 77°40′01″W

Shilla
- District
- Coat of arms
- Interactive map of Shilla
- Country: Peru
- Region: Ancash
- Province: Carhuaz
- Founded: December 14, 1934
- Capital: Shilla

Government
  - Mayor: Vidal Orlando Collpa Leyva

Area
  - Total: 130.19 km^{2} (50.27 sq mi)
- Elevation: 3,910 m (12,830 ft)

Population (2017)
  - Total: 2,789
  - Density: 21.42/km^{2} (55.48/sq mi)
- Time zone: UTC-5 (PET)
- UBIGEO: 020609
- Website: munishilla.gob.pe

Shilla District is one of eleven districts of the Carhuaz Province in Peru.

== Ethnic groups ==
The people in the district are mainly indigenous citizens of Quechua descent. Quechua is the language which the majority of the population (96.48%) learnt to speak in childhood, 3.23% of the residents started speaking using the Spanish language (2007 Peru Census).

== See also ==
- Ancash Quechua
