= Carhuaz province =

Coordinates: 9.067°S 77.817°W

Carhuaz
- Province
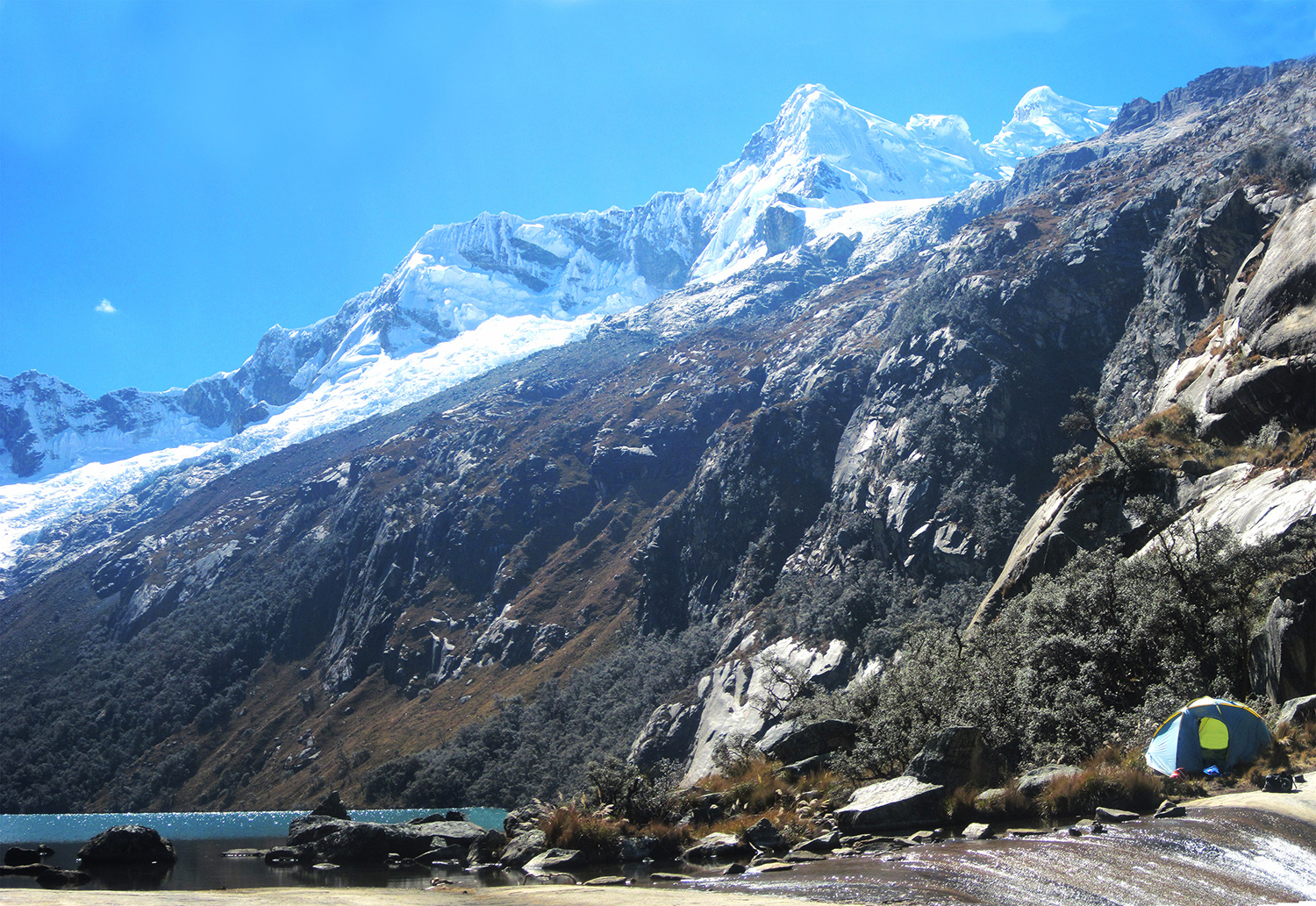
- Awkishqucha

- Flag Coat of arms

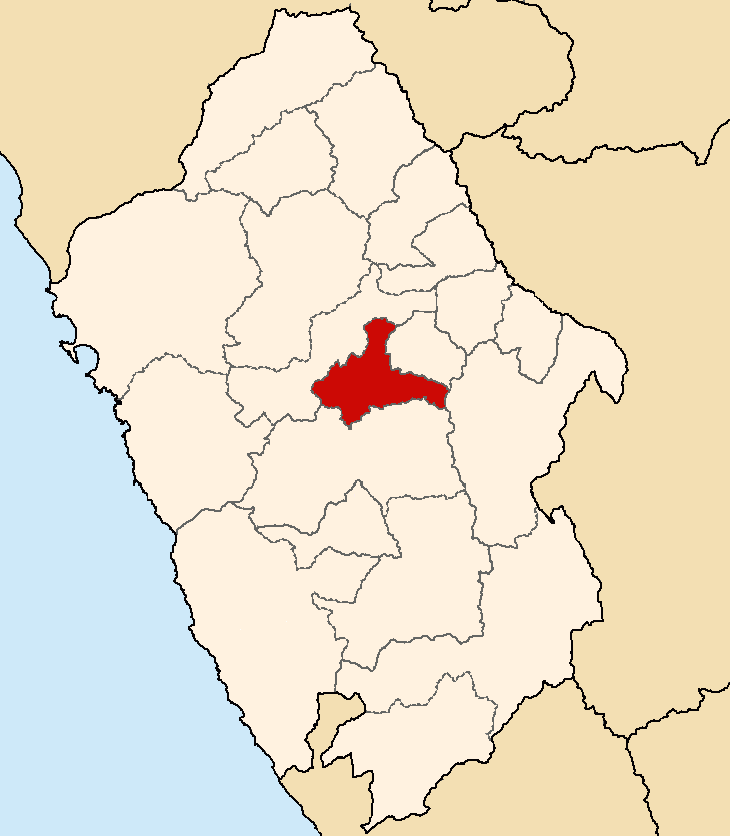
- Location of Carhuaz in the Ancash Region
- Country: Peru
- Region: Ancash
- Capital: Carhuaz

Government
  - Mayor: Pablo Pedro Julca Chávez (2019-2022)

Area
  - Total: 804 km^{2} (310 sq mi)

Population
  - Total: 45,184
  - Density: 56.2/km^{2} (146/sq mi)
- Website: www.municarhuaz.gob.pe

Carhuaz is one of twenty provinces in the Ancash Region of Peru.

== Geography ==
The Cordillera Blanca traverses the province. Waskaran, its highest elevation, lies on the border with the province of Yungay. Pallqarahu, Pukaranra, Qupa, Tuqllarahu, Wallqan and Yanarahu belong to the highest peaks of the province. Other mountains are listed below:

- Chiqllarahu
- Hatun Qiqa
- Hatun Qutu
- Kuntur Wayin
- Llika Mach'ay
- Minuyu
- Paqtsarahu
- Paqtsaruri
- Perlilla
- Pumapampa
- Qaqapampa
- Q'awa Qutu
- Rurichinchay
- Saywan Punta
- T'uruq Punta
- Uchpay
- Wamanripa
- Wantu Hirka
- Warmi Qucha
- Wathiya Qutu
- Wiñaq
- Yana Qucha
- Yana Qutu
- Yanarahu

== Political division ==
Carhuaz is divided into eleven districts:

- Acopampa
- Amashca
- Anta
- Ataquero
- Carhuaz
- Marcará
- Pariahuanca
- San Miguel de Aco
- Shilla
- Tinco
- Yungar

== Ethnic groups ==
The people in the province are mainly indigenous citizens of Quechua descent. Quechua is the language which the majority of the population (73.27%) learnt to speak in childhood, 26.47% of the residents started speaking using the Spanish language (2007 Peru Census).
