= Marcará District =

Coordinates: 9°16′59″S 77°36′00″W

Marcará
- District
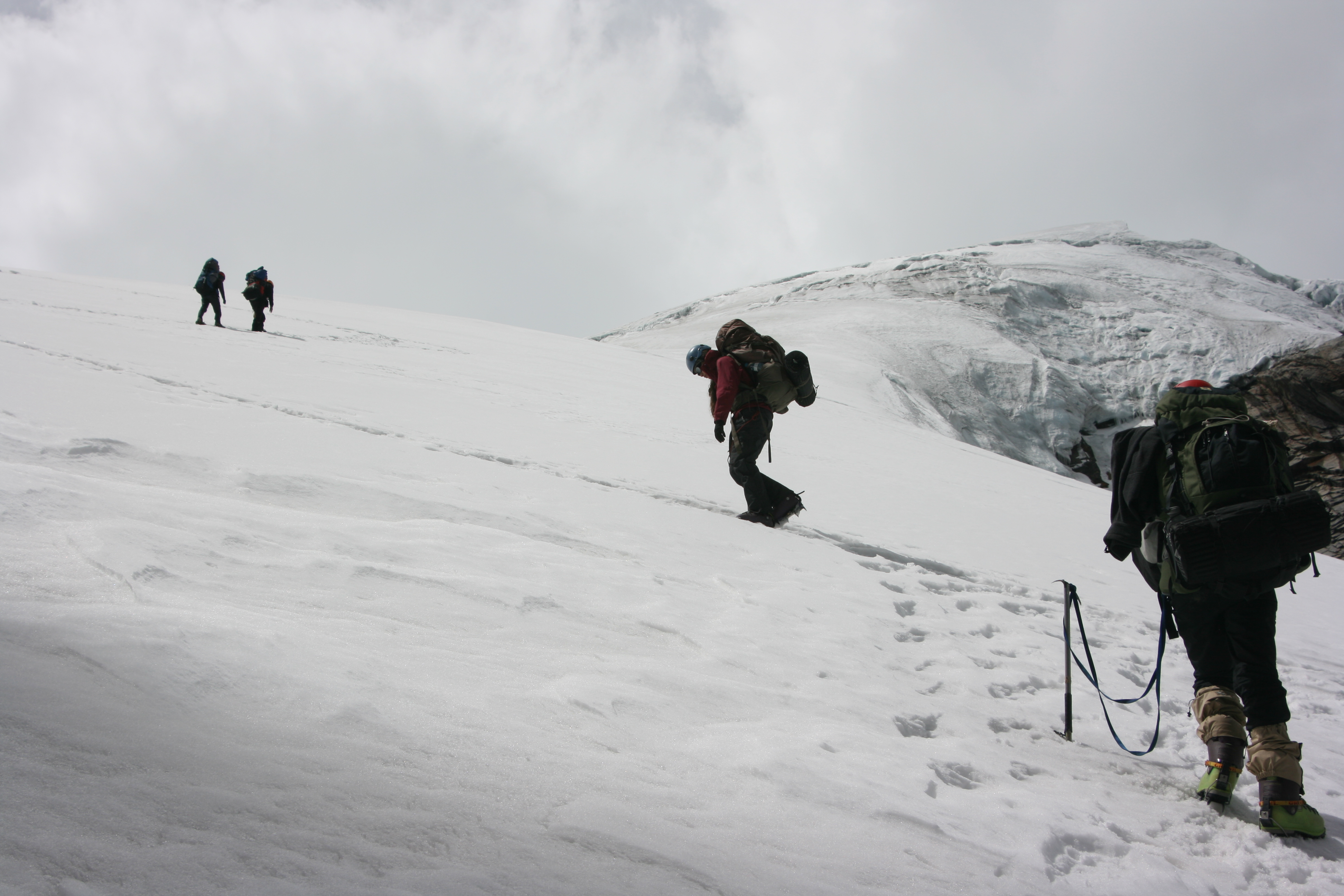
- Peru 2010
- Interactive map of Marcará
- Country: Peru
- Region: Ancash
- Province: Carhuaz
- Founded: October 6, 1905
- Capital: Marcará

Government
  - Mayor: Jorge Patricio Cruz Lazaro

Area
  - Total: 157.49 km^{2} (60.81 sq mi)
- Elevation: 2,726 m (8,944 ft)

Population (2005 census)
  - Total: 8,879
  - Density: 56.38/km^{2} (146.0/sq mi)
- Time zone: UTC-5 (PET)
- UBIGEO: 020606

Marcará District is one of eleven districts of the Carhuaz Province in Peru.

== Ethnic groups ==
The people in the district are mainly indigenous citizens of Quechua descent. Quechua is the language which the majority of the population (76.61%) learnt to speak in childhood, 23.08% of the residents started speaking using the Spanish language (2007 Peru Census).

== See also ==
- Ancash Quechua
