= Patarcocha (Ancash) =

Lake in Ancash Region, Peru

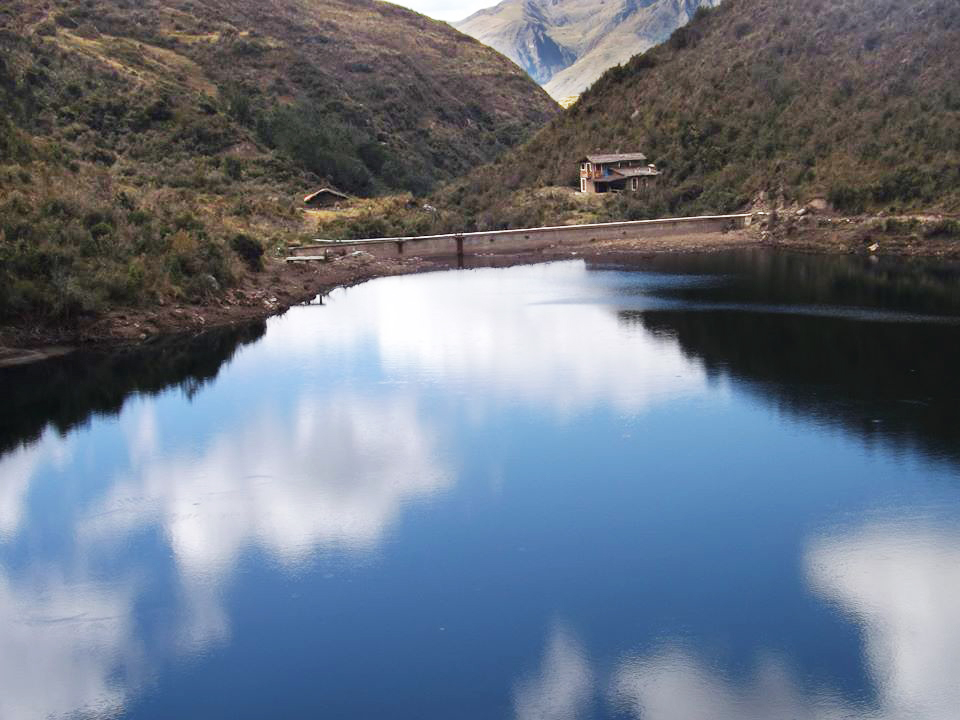

- Location within Peru
- Location: Peru; Ancash Region
- Coordinates: 9°12′40″S 77°21′30″W
- Max. length: 259 m (850 ft)
- Max. width: 147 m (482 ft)
- Surface elevation: 3,900 m (12,800 ft)

Patarcocha (possibly from Quechua qucha lake,) is a lake in the Cordillera Blanca in the Andes of Peru located in the Ancash Region, Asunción Province, Chacas District. It is situated at a height of 3,900 metres (12,795 ft), 259 m long and 147 m at its widest point. Patarcocha lies northwest of the lakes Yanacocha, Huegroncocha and Runtococha.

== See also ==
- Lauricocha
