= Chacas (disambiguation) =

Chacas can refer to a city and a district in Peru.

For the use of the term in a specific setting, see:

- Chacas for the town in Peru
- Chacas District for the district in the Asunción province in Ancash
