= Pomabamba (mountain) =

Mountain in Peru

- Rataquenua, Portachuelo
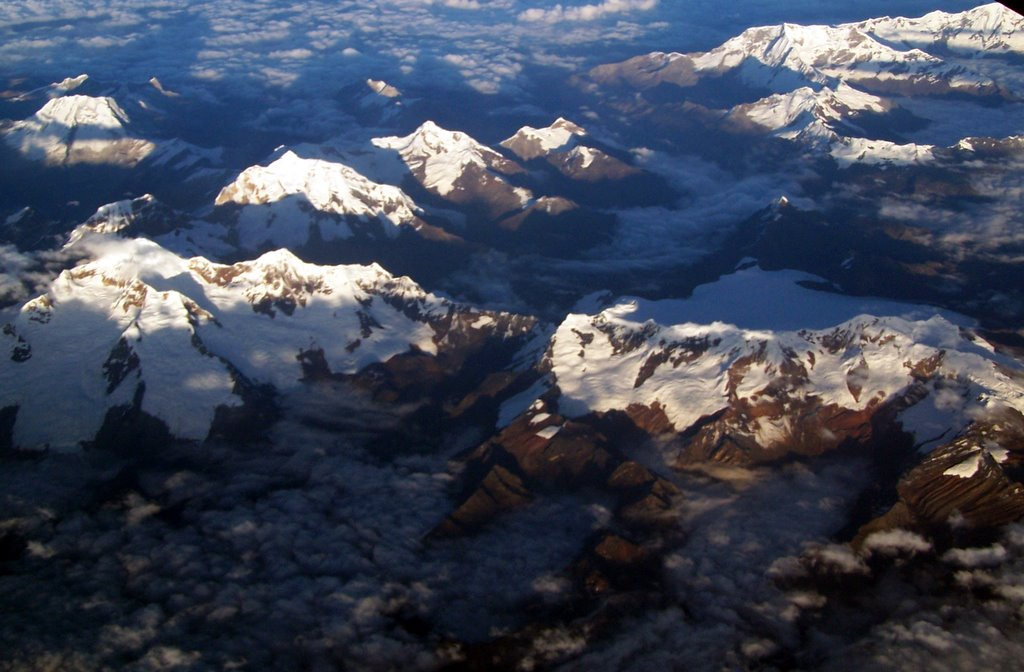
- Aerial view of the Cordillera Blanca as seen from the south-east with Perlilla (bottom right) and Pomabamba (above it)

Highest point
- Elevation: 5,300 m (17,400 ft)
- Coordinates: 9°17′33″S 77°22′16″W

Geography
- Location within Peru
- Location: Ancash, Peru
- Parent range: Andes, Cordillera Blanca

Pomabamba (possibly from Quechua puma cougar, puma, pampa a large plain, "cougar plain"), Rataquenua or Portachuelo is a mountain in the Cordillera Blanca in the Andes of Peru, of 5,336 metres (17,507 ft) high (other elevation cited is 5,340 metres (17,520 ft)). It is located between Asunción and Carhuaz provinces, in the region of Ancash. Pomabamba lies between Copa to the west and Perlilla to the east, southwest of lakes Yanaqucha, Paqarisha (Pagarisha) and Lawriqucha.
