= Chacas =

Town in Ancash, Peru

Coordinates: 9°15′S 77°22′W

San Martín de Chacas Chacas
- Town
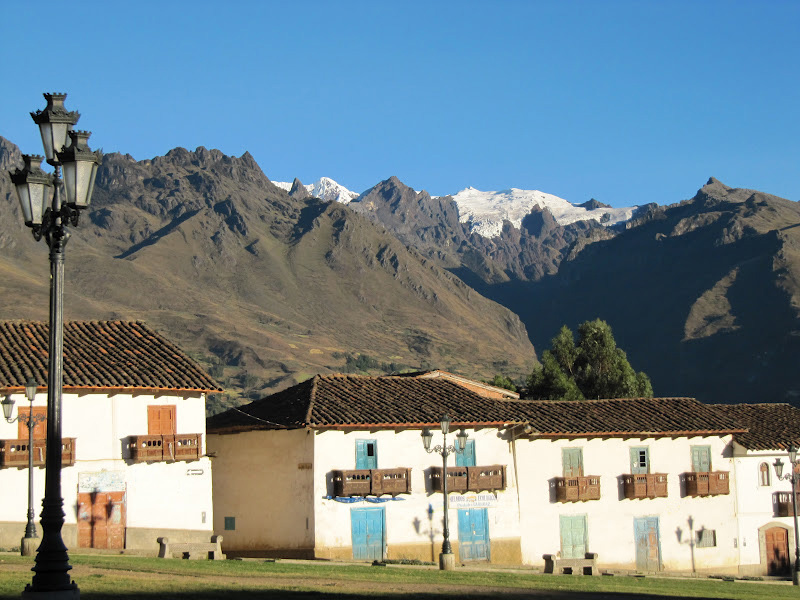
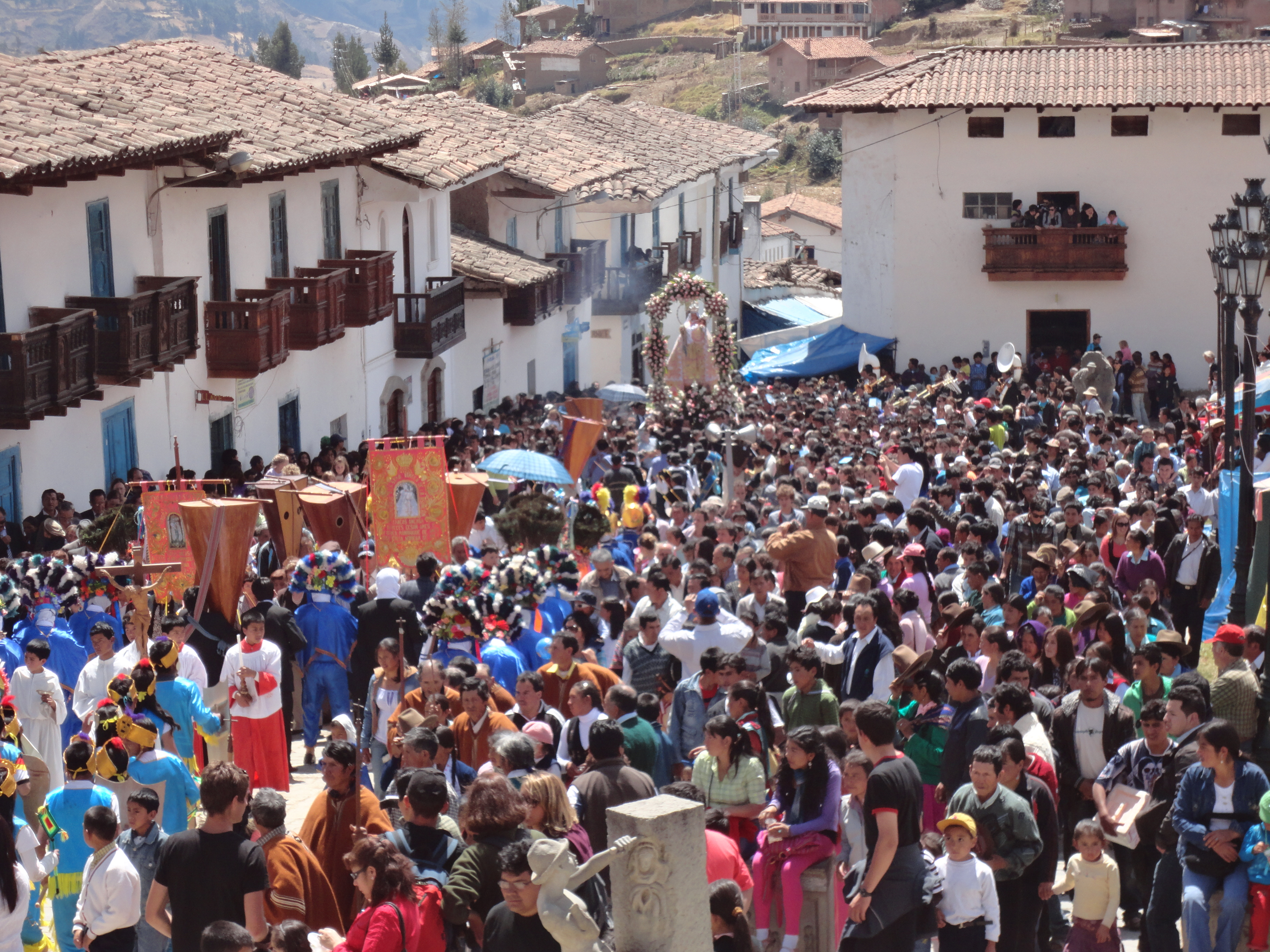
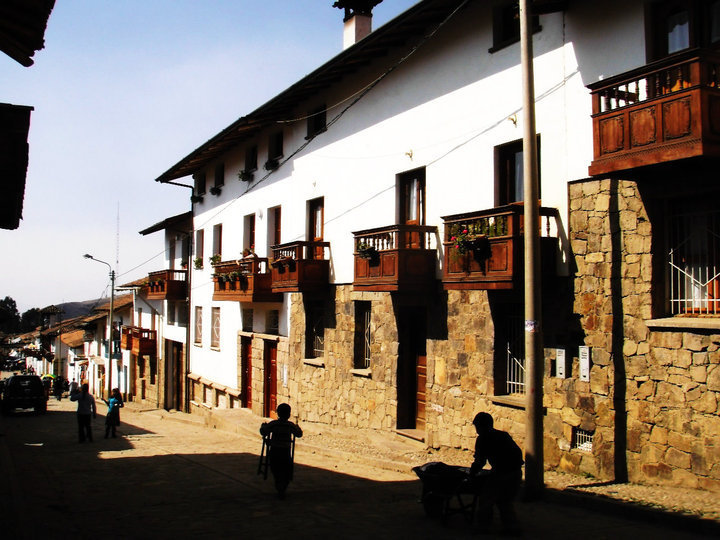
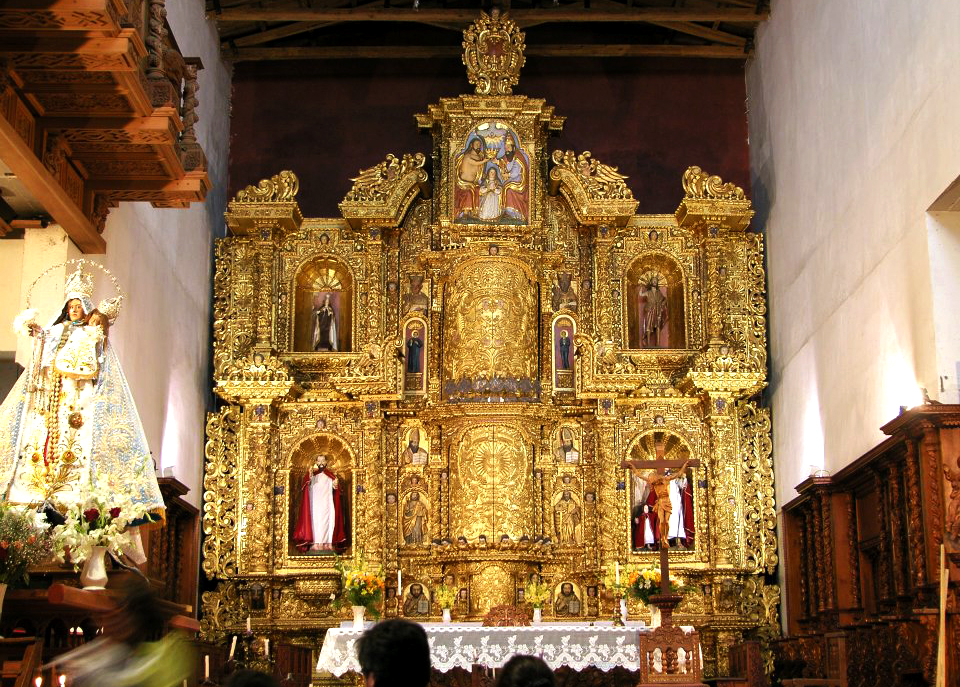
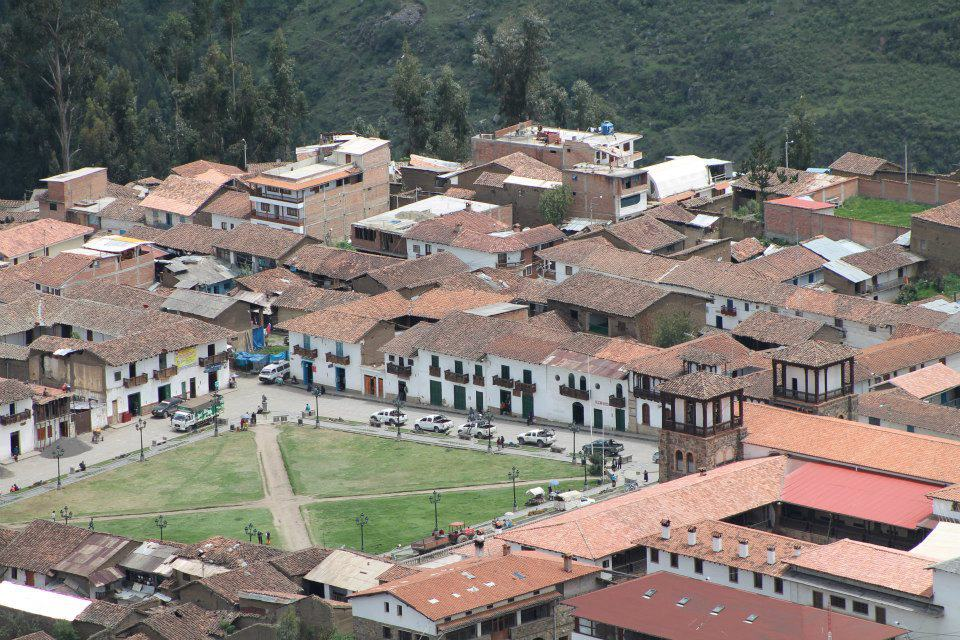
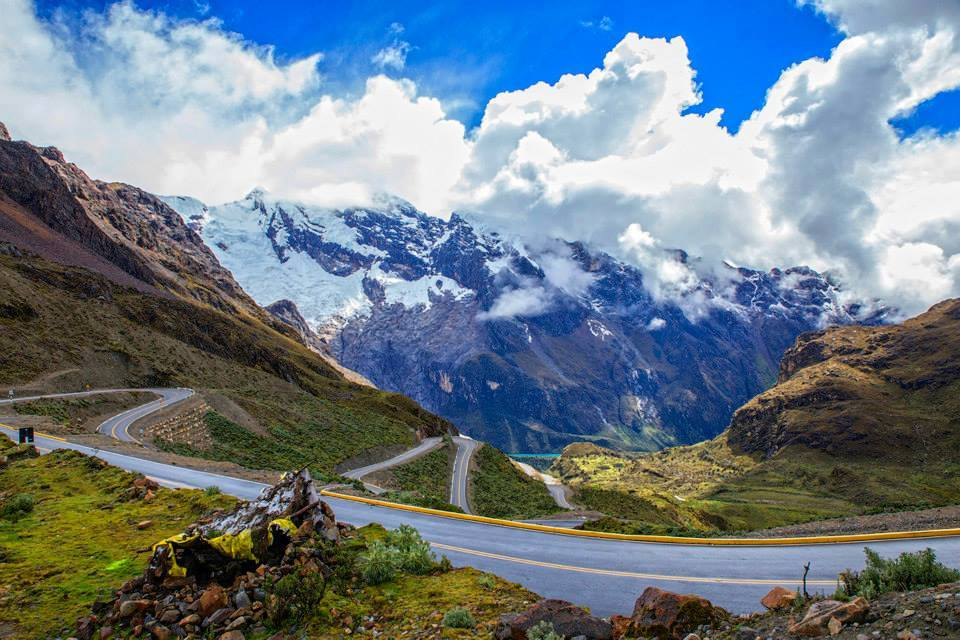
- From top, left to right: Chacas in 2012, procession of Mama Ashu, Italian houses of Lombard style, Baroque altarpiece of 1750, colonial houses and Camchas mountain, Route AN-107 with the snowy mountain Yanarraju.

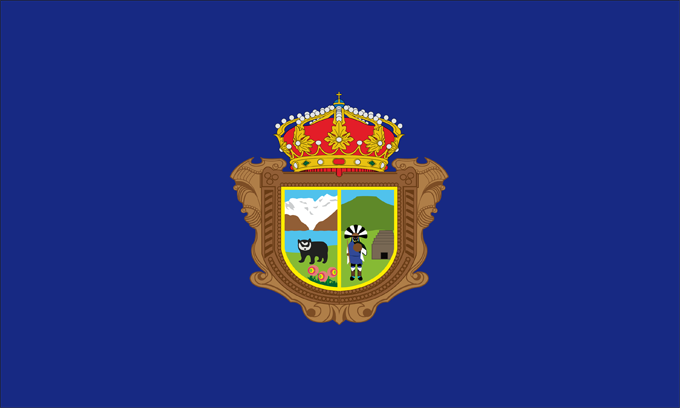
- Flag Seal
- Nickname: City of the stones
- Motto: Naturaleza, arte y fe para el mundo (Nature, art and faith for the world)
- Interactive map of San Martín de Chacas
- Country: Peru
- Region: Ancash
- Province: Asunción
- District: Chacas

Government
  - Mayor: Jesus Zaragoza Guzman (2019-2022)

Area
  - Total: 447.69 km^{2} (172.85 sq mi)
- Elevation: 3.359 m (11.02 ft)
- Website: www.munichacas.gob.pe

San Martín de Chacas is a Peruvian town, capital of the eponymous district and the Asunción Province, located in the east-central region of Ancash. It has an urban population of 2,082 located at 3,359 meters; and a district of 5,334 people. The district, located in the sub-basin of the Marañon River, has an area of 447.69 km^{2}, which represents 85% of the province.

Chacas was founded in the 1570s, but it is known that the territory now covered by the province to which it belongs, together with the provinces of Huari and Carlos Fermín Fitzcarrald, are the most remote evidence of human presence in the Eastern Sierra Ancash, represented by the findings of caves and rock shelters prior to the Chavin culture. The ethnic group that was present in this place after the fall of the Chavin culture was the lordship of Huari.

The city is characterized for having remained unchanged over the original Andean-Andalusian architecture, with narrow streets, houses adorned with double water carved balconies and gates, made by craftsmen Don Bosco, whom Fr. Ugo de Censi, Operation Mato Grosso (with Chacas as a hub) and Italian residents for thirty years, took charge of rebuilding the shrine Mama Ashu and restoration of the baroque altarpiece dating from the 17th century. There is now developing artwork for export to Europe and the United States, in addition to the unique stained glass factory in South America, having played an essiental role in the development of the city.

During the festivities in honor of the Assumption of the Virgin Mary, the bullfight and the Race To Tapes are held in the main square; has Mozo Danza ritual dance, Dance Cultural Heritage of the Nation and the Provincial Museum exhibits an extensive collection of pre-Columbian pieces.

== Toponymy ==
There are two versions about the meaning of the name:

- It comes from the Quechua word chaka that can be translated into Spanish as a bridge, for it is based on the argument that all roads in and out of people always crossing bridges.
- It comes from the Quechua word chaga meaning Atalaya, on the basis that Chacas imedia of more than 6 pirushtus.

== Geography ==
=== Location ===
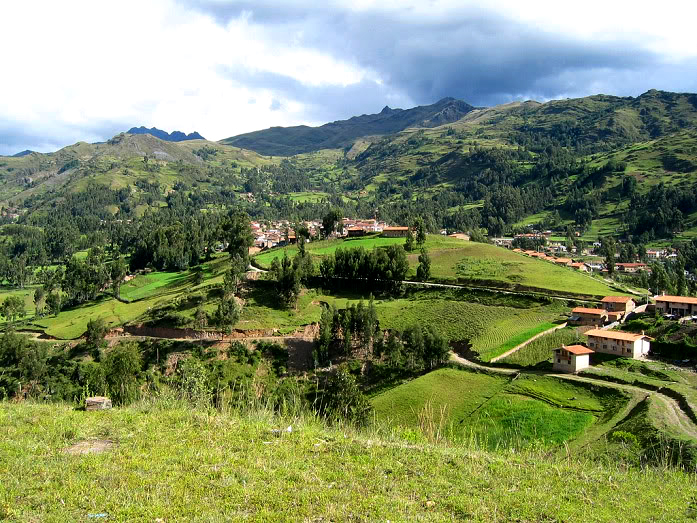
Chacas includes moderately steep hills of related agricultural uses.

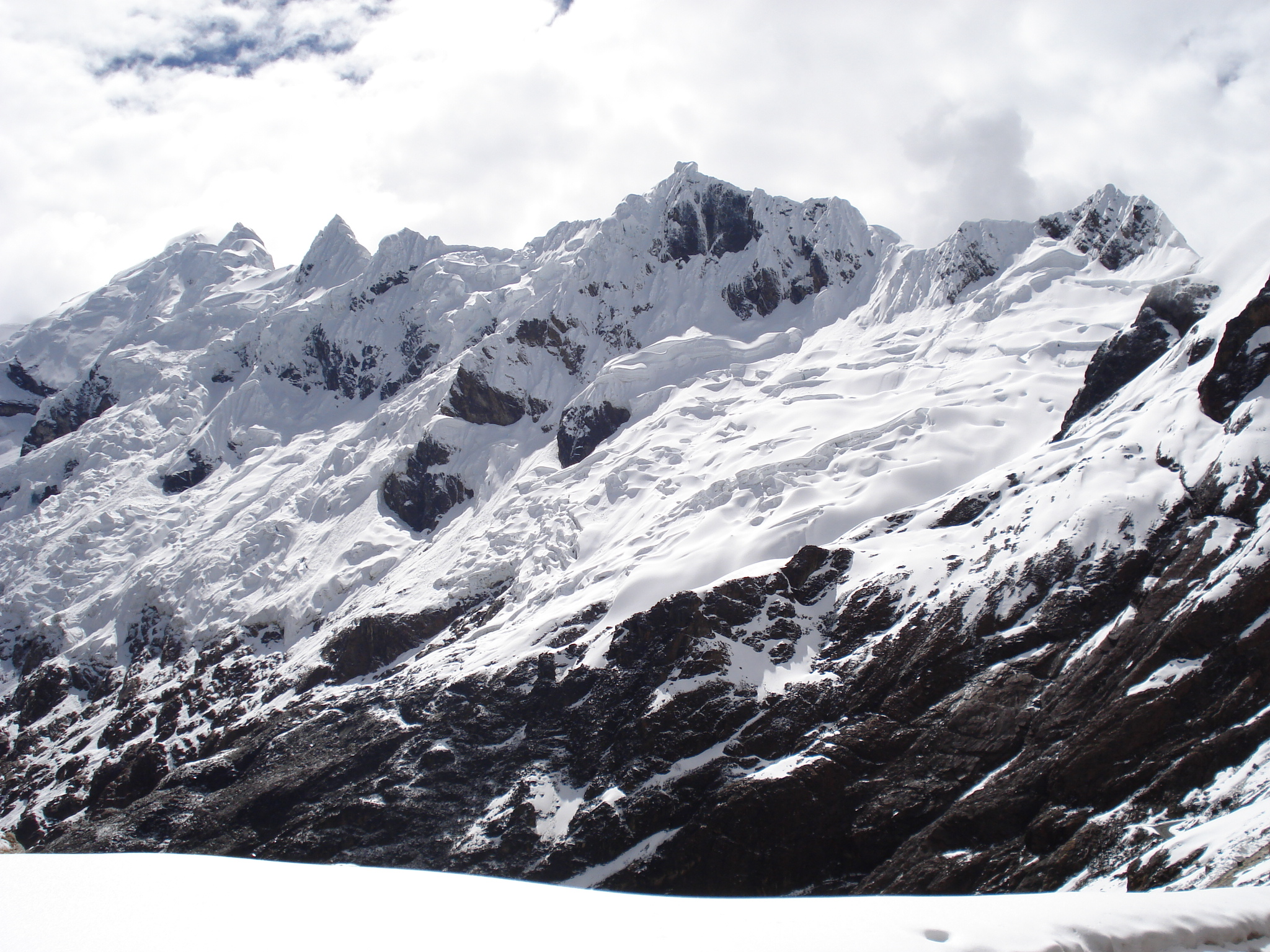
The south peak of Yanarahu which makes a natural border between the provinces Carhuaz and Asunción

Chacas district is located in the eastern slope of the White Mountains in the buffer zone of the Huascarán National Park. According to Javier Pulgar Vidal, the district includes the altitudinal Quechua, Suni or Jalca and Janca, and its elevation ranges from 2,800 meters in Upakasha, to 6,173 meters in the mountain Copa North. Chacas center is in the Quechua zone, where wheat ( Triticum spp.) and other cereals are grown.

It is bordered to the northwest, west and southwest by the Carhuaz Province, to the north by the Acochaca District, to the northeast and east by the Carlos Fermín Fitzcarrald Province and to the southeast by the Huari Province.

=== Terrain ===
The town Chacas is located on a plateau consisting mostly of undulating dacite, rising from its lowest point in the town of Chucpin to 3000 m to 3560 m above sea level in Cochas. The terrain around this plateau, as in the province, is very rugged and mountainous. The terrain elevations are higher up on the west bank of the district to share the White Mountains with Carhuaz. The highest peaks are the Perlilla (5,586 m), located to the south east, Wakuy with 4,702 meters to the west and Copa (6,173 m).

=== Hydrography ===
The district hydrographic network consists of a set of rivers and streams that wash many geographical areas, and completing a map of water resources for the district, both for human consumption and for irrigation. As for the rivers, there are two main running through the district from south to north: The Gun River, which rises on the slopes of Perlilla S, and Chakapata river, which rises on the slopes of the Ulta W. These channels are fed by 35 streams along its route to its junction Puruytumaq where the river takes the name of Aquchaka.

The most important streams are used by towns to ensure water supplies for irrigation and human consumption are: to the east, Rayan, west and south the Camchas the Juitush.

The district has 32 lakes, only one has been dammed for the purpose of human consumption, Patarqucha. The major gaps are: Libron and Cancaraca west, south, and Patarqucha Pagarisha, east Wakuyqucha and Ventanilla.

=== Climate ===
The district area has a diverse range of microclimate. These will vary according to altitude, latitude and other factors. Because of its location (puna low) and being close to tropical, presents a stark contrast of temperatures 24 hours a day. For example, on a clear day (July) temperatures range between 10 ° and 30 °Celsius, while night temperatures range from -3 ° to 10 °Celsius.

== History ==
=== Beginnings ===
According to the theory of Julio C. Tello, the first settlers of this region were the Waris, from Central America arrived by way of the jungle and populated the South American continent.

=== Chavin influence ===
There is evidence that Chavín has been the cultural center of Wari in the north, as was Tiwanaku in the south. Therefore, the Chavin culture in those times influenced throughout Ancash. The disintegration of the powerful Wari empire, different nations united by raza, language, customs, religion, organized themselves into kingdoms was a time of war between these groups, which turned into surrender in small towns to large estates, so formed the nation of the Conchucos, composed of numerous tribes in the territory now occupied by the provinces Huari, Antonio Raimondi, Fitzcarraldo, Asunción, Pomabamba, Mariscal Luzuriaga, Sihuas, Corongo, Pallasca.

=== Recuay and Pashash ===
Between the years 100 to 1000 AD, Pashash culture developed in the northern Sierra de Ancash (Cabana) and projected towards the center and south of the same department. It is called Recuay culture (Pashash-Recuay) the late development of Pashash culture (500-1000 AD), it is noteworthy that before being hit by Pashash-Recuay, already living in those places small agricultural towns of rural life and manufacturing ceramics simple.

=== Inca Period ===
Between the years 1000 to 1470 was the time of the stately formations late late or regional states, which also had demonstrations in the territories of the province Asunción today. Chacas (provincial capital) was one of the lordships of the kingdom of Conchucos (on the eastern slopes of the Cordillera Blanca), which flourished until the Inca domination. Inca domination was between 1460 and 1533. The kingdoms of Huaylas (western slope of the Cordillera Blanca) and were incorporated into Tawantinsuyu Conchucos, after a bloody invasion of the Inca Pachacuti, mission fulfilled his brother, General Qhapaq Yupanqui. That process of domination was incomplete, though it lasted 80 years, the Spanish set foot on this REGON when cuzqueñización process still was not finished. For this reason the Inca institutions not lay deep roots in the soil conchucano as illustrated by the Fr. Santiago Márquez. The abundance of pirushtus, which are defensive constructions parte4s raised in the higher hills, witnessed by the existence of antagonistic groups living and warring between themselves. There is evidence that the Incas failed to fully impose their culture, which explains differences in custom, religion and language of Ancash with respect to Cuzco.

=== Colonial Period ===
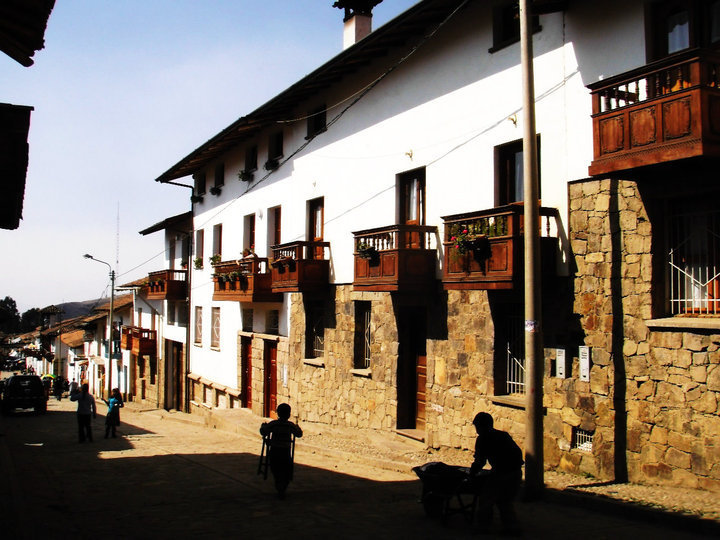
Balconies renewed by Italian Don Bosco artists in Jirón Lima

The founding of the town was entrusted to the evangelizers of the Order of San Agustín Hernando García, Alfonso Espinoza, the captain and advance of Huánuco, Alonso de Santoyo y Valverde and the encomendero of Icho Huari: Diego de Álvarez. The founding act took place in April 1572, during the festive month of San Martín I, who would be the patron saint of the town located in the domains of the huari curaca Francisco Tocto de Chagastunán San José de Mushuqmarka: Founded in 1716, it was the largest mill of the present territory of Asunción for 60 years, owned by Captain Juan Tafur mining of Cordova, which operated mines of Caxavilca, Kellayruna, Chucpin, Huiro and others founded the chaplaincy of Mushuqmarka in 1718, before Don Gabriel Mechado de Castro, chief justice and lieutenant-general of the province of Conchucos, awarding of the said goods grinding mill metals to their alfalfa and grain mill mol.

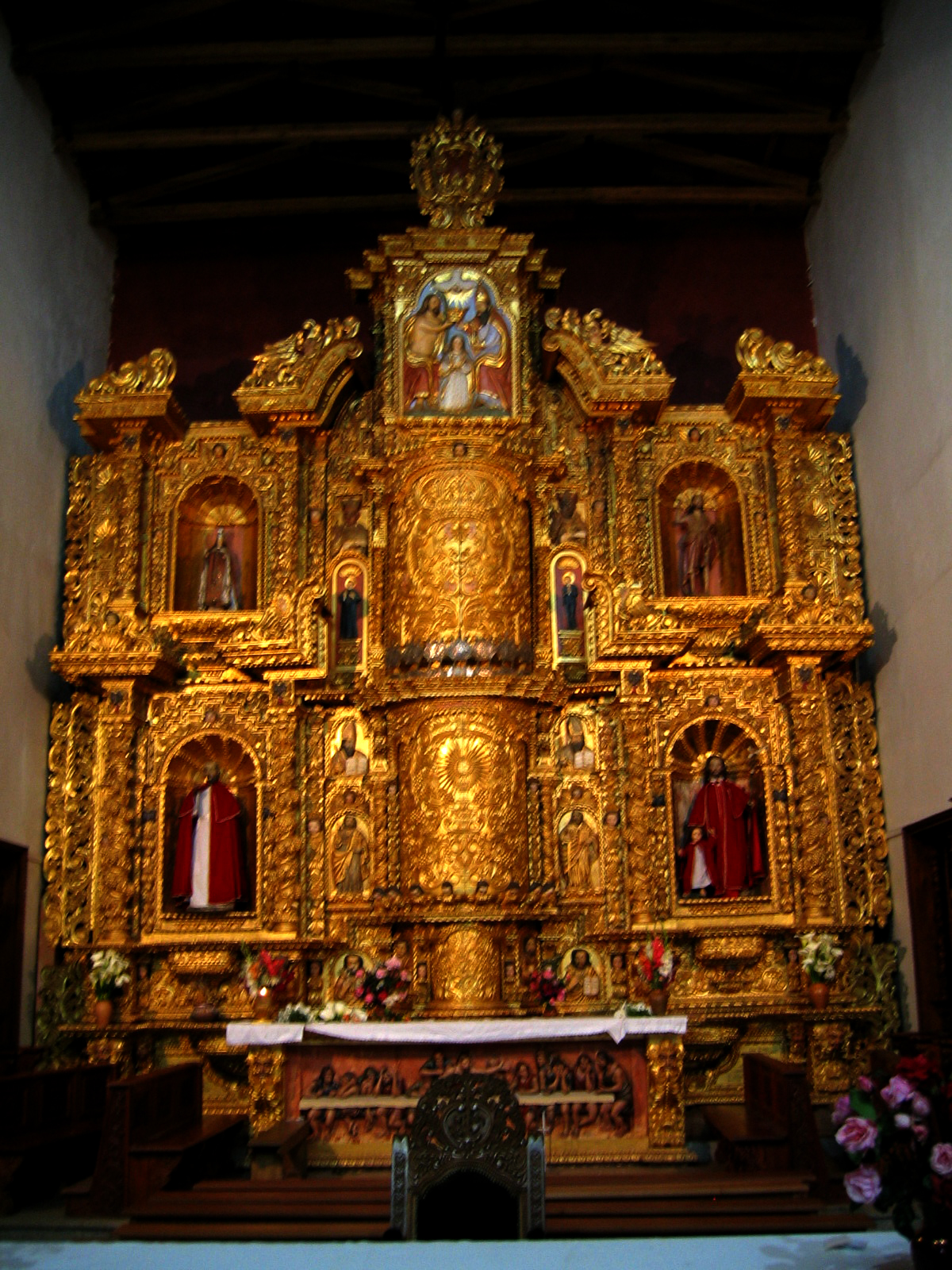
In his will, Juan Tafur of Cordova ordered to be built an altar in the Church of Chacas to move to the virgin of his chaplaincy in Mushojmarca.

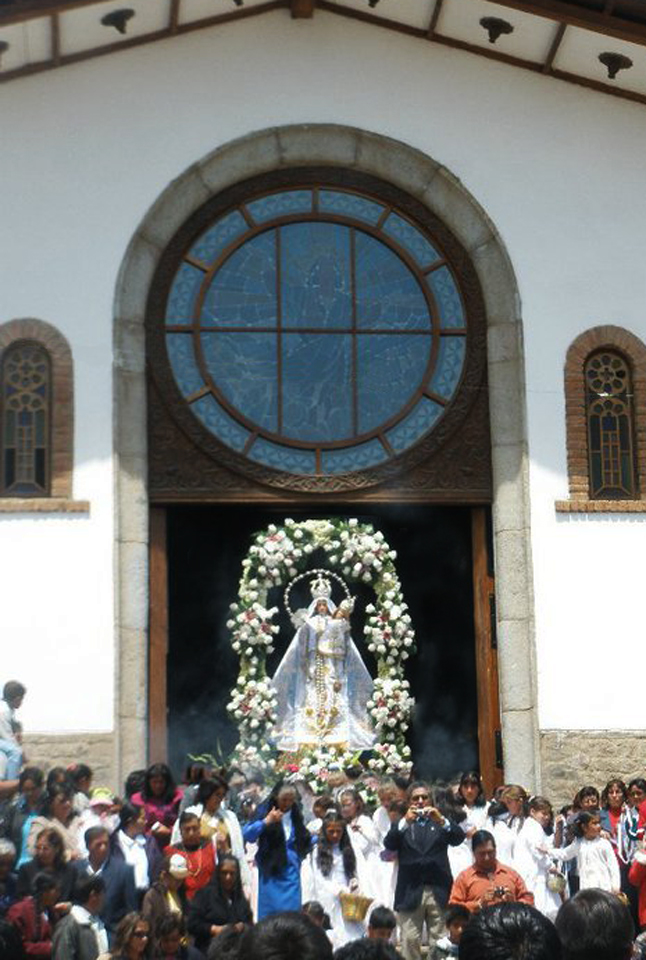
Our Virgin of Assumption remained in the ingenio Mushojmarca of the 1700.

The Chacas temple was built on the oldest and most important ceremonial center or huaca in the territory, one of the native shrines (pirushtus) of pre-Inca origin that served as a sacred place for the cult of the huanca Piedra de Chacas —This idol remained in its original location until the middle of the 20th century. Three meters below the level of the church and the cemetery, on a sloping terrain, the main square was laid out with 100 Spanish rods per side (83 meters), the four main streets and the blocks, thus forming a checkerboard urbanization. The buildings that surrounded the main square were built and occupied by the first native families arriving from Chagastunán and Macuash. The Spanish members of the clergy and the viceregal institutions settled in the cloister of the temple, while the viceregal institutions such as the town hall, the school and the prison were built in the plaza.

=== Independence ===
During the process of independence of Peru, Chacas contributed a considerable number of men to the ranks of the liberating armies, among these it is worth highlighting the actions of the Chacasino priest Tadeo Gómez Alvarado,43 who fulfilled ecclesiastical functions in Huarmey, who joined a guerrilla group. on horseback under the command of the Aijino priest Gabino Uribe, to rescue a patriotic contingent from the hands of rebellious royalist prisoners in Huarmey, they were reached and surrendered in Huayan, Uribe's regiment triumphantly entered Huaraz, on April 30, 1821.

=== Republican period ===
In mid-1825, during the government of Simón Bolívar, the old curates or parishes of Conchucos were elevated to districts, thus the district of Chacas was born as part of the province of Huari.49. In 1837, Francisco Aráoz de La Madrid, Argentine hero of the Independence of Peru, who, already retired from military life, held the position of Governor of the province of Conchucos, died in Chacas.

On January 2, 1857, when Ramón Castilla was president of Peru, the district of Chacas (created in 1825) was officially recognized by law during the National Convention of Peru (1855–1857), José Gálvez Egúsquiza was president of that assembly.

The zenith of mining activity began in the 1860s, in a commercial context conditioned by the high demand for metals in European and American industries, which led numerous foreign investors to settle in this area of Áncash. Italian, English, French, German and Croatian businessmen undertook various activities, mining being one of the most important. In 1875, the Pompey and El Vesubio mining companies were founded, the largest and most modern in Chacas and the province of Huari. They exploited gold, silver, lead, copper and zinc from the heights of the Cordillera Blanca.

=== Ugo de Censi ===
In 1976, priest Ugo de Censi, Italian missionary and founder of Operation Mato Grosso, a social cooperation organization made up of young Italians who collaborated with disadvantaged populations in Brazil, settled in the town. The religious noted the inequality gap between some residents, landowners and mining businessmen and the rural population, who lived in extreme poverty and abandoned their lands to migrate to cities in search of better opportunities. Moved, he founded the Don Bosco Workshop School in 1978, for the poorest children and orphans in the district.

== S. XXI ==
After 2 years of work, in August 2013 the paving of the modern AN-107 departmental route was inaugurated, the result of 12 years of efforts. The highway includes the second highest vehicular tunnel in the world: the Punta Olímpica tunnel, the work reduces the travel time to Huaraz from 7 hours to only 3 hours.

In October 2023, the town received the distinction as one of the “Best Tourism Villages in the World” (Best Tourism Villages) in its 2023-2024 edition. Chavín de Huántar, Paucartambo, Pozuzo and Taquile were also selected by the World Tourism Organization (UNWTO), after passing a strict evaluation that considered nine areas. This is the case of: Cultural and natural resources; Promotion and conservation of cultural resources; Economic sustainability; Social sustainability; Environmental sustainability, Tourism development and value chain integration, Governance and prioritization of tourism; Infrastructure and connectivity; and Health and Safety

== Tourism ==
The provincial municipality of Asunción has a collection of ceramics, sculpture and other ancient artifacts of approximately 400 pieces; which is considered one of the largest in Áncash. Thanks to the inter-institutional support of the Italian commune of Milan, the parish of Chacas and the municipality, the Chacas Archeology Museum exhibits about thirty pieces. In the district there are more than 100 archaeological remains, 32 of them are declared as Cultural Heritage.

== Folklore ==
=== Dances ===
The types of dance practiced in the province are varied, here are some:

- Anti (Antiruna)
- Corpus Dance Dance or Porter (declared a National Cultural Heritage)
- Shaqsha
- Wari
- Paso Wankillas
- Palla
- Bold
- Atawallpa
- Pizarros
- Llallu.

=== Celebrations ===
==== Festivities in honor of Mama Ashu ====
The main festival is the August 15 for "Mama Ashu" (cult devoted to Virgin of the Assumption).
