= Chacas District =

Coordinates: 8°52′59″S 78°10′01″W

Chacas
- District
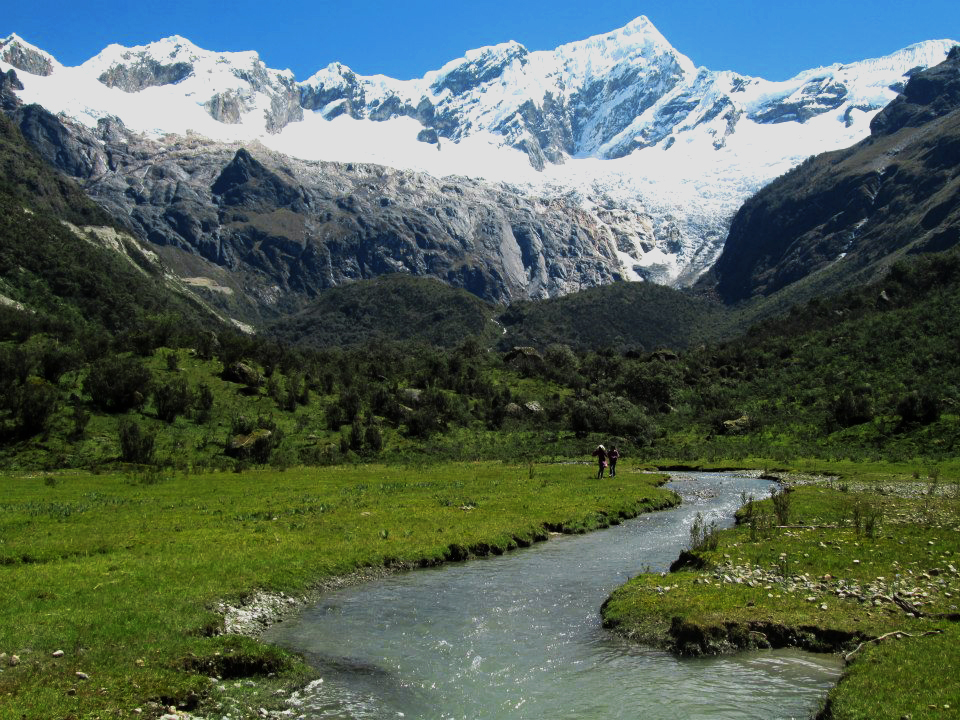
- Putaqa River with Yanarahu in the background
- Interactive map of Chacas
- Country: Peru
- Region: Ancash
- Province: Asunción
- Founded: 1820
- Capital: Chacas

Government
  - Mayor: Jesus Zaragoza Guzman (2019-2022)

Area
  - Total: 447.69 km^{2} (172.85 sq mi)
- Elevation: 3,359 m (11,020 ft)

Population (2017)
  - Total: 4,563
  - Density: 10.19/km^{2} (26.40/sq mi)
- Time zone: UTC-5 (PET)
- UBIGEO: 020401

Chacas is a district of the province Asunción in the Ancash Region of Peru. Its seat is Chacas.

== Geography ==
The Cordillera Blanca traverses the district. Some of the highest peaks of the district are Wallqan and Yanarahu. Other mountains are listed below:

- Artisayuq
- Kanchas
- Palla Hirka
- Paqtsarahu
- Pumapampa
- Qaqapampa
- Qupa
- Qupap
- Tarush Kancha
- Tarush Wachanan
- Yawina

== Ethnic groups ==
The people in the district are mainly indigenous citizens of Quechua descent. Quechua is the language which the majority of the population (72.01%) learnt to speak in childhood, 26.42% of the residents started speaking Spanish (2007 Peru Census).

== See also ==
- Alliqucha
- Ancash Quechua
- Lawriqucha
- Paryaqucha
- Pataqucha
- Runtuqucha
- Waqramarka
- Yanaqucha
- Yanarahu Lake
