= Patarcocha =

Patarcocha is the name of two lakes in Peru:

- Lake Patarcocha, Huánuco Region
- Patarcocha (Ancash), Ancash Region
