= Yanarraju Lake =

Lake in Peru

- Laguna Yanarraju
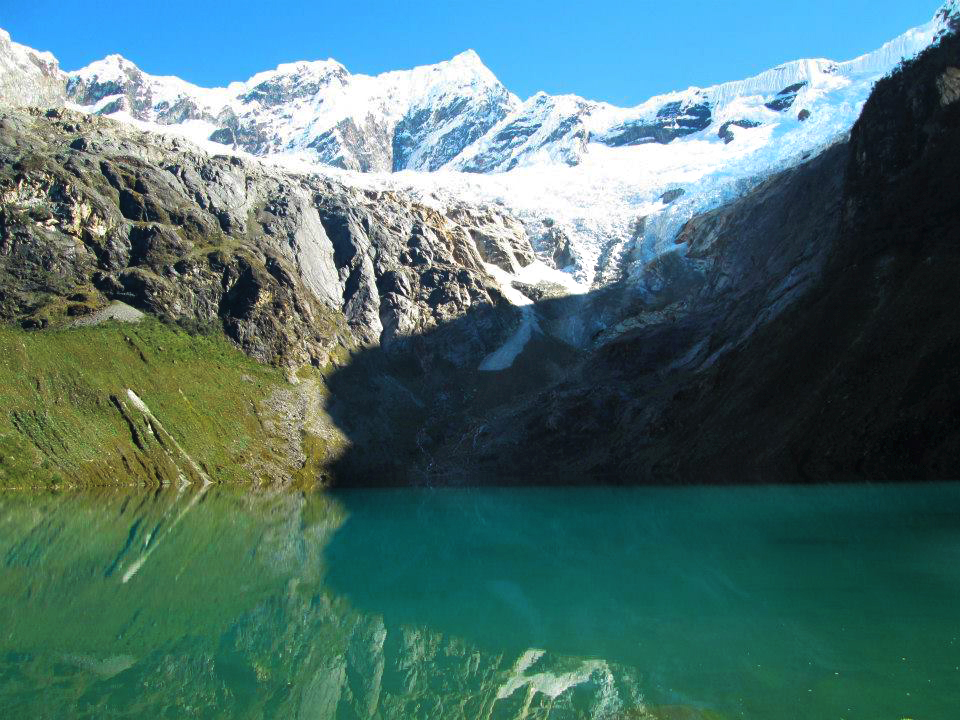
- Yanarraju Lake in front of the mountain Contrahierbas

- Location within Peru Location within South America
- Interactive map of Yanarraju Lake
- Location: Peru; Ancash Region
- Coordinates: 9°07′58″S 77°29′02″W

Yanarraju Lake (possibly from Quechua yana black, rahu snow, ice, mountain with snow, "black snow peak") is a lake in the Cordillera Blanca in the Andes of Peru located in the Ancash Region, Asunción Province, Chacas District. It lies near Contrahierbas.

== See also ==
- Huajramarca
