= Huegroncocha =

Lake in the Andes of Peru

- Location within Peru
- Location: Peru; Ancash Region
- Coordinates: 9°14′29″S 77°20′52″W
- Max. length: 393 m (1,289 ft)
- Max. width: 120 m (390 ft)
- Surface elevation: 4,250 m (13,940 ft)

Huegroncocha (possibly from in the Quechua spelling Wiqrunqucha; wiqru twisted, bent, -n a suffix, qucha lake,) is a lake in the Cordillera Blanca in the Andes of Peru located in the Ancash Region, Asunción Province, Chacas District. It is situated at a height of 4,250 metres (13,944 ft), 393 metres (1,289 ft) long and 120 metres (394 ft) wide at its widest point. Huegroncocha lies north of the lake Yanacocha and west of the lake Runtococha.
