= Lake Pariacocha =

Lake in Peru

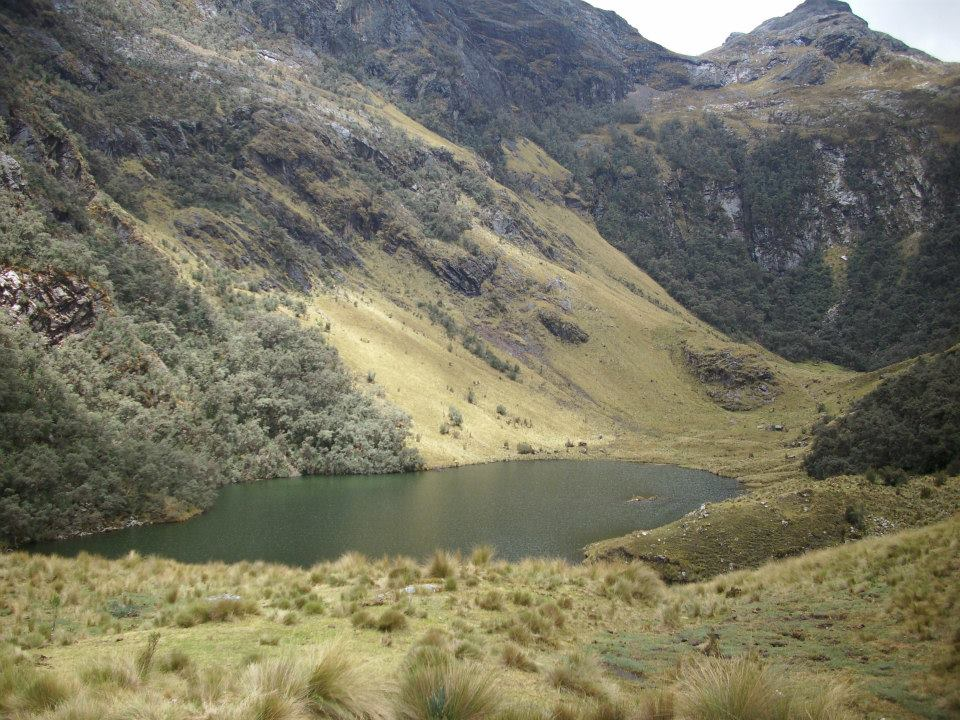

- Location within Peru
- Location: Peru; Ancash Region
- Coordinates: 9°10′18″S 77°18′38″W

Lake Pariacocha (possibly from Quechua parya reddish, copper or sparrow, qucha lake) is a lake in the eastern part of the Cordillera Blanca in the Andes of Peru. It is located in the Ancash Region, Asunción Province, Chacas District.
