= Ugo De Censi =

Italian-Peruvian Salesian priest

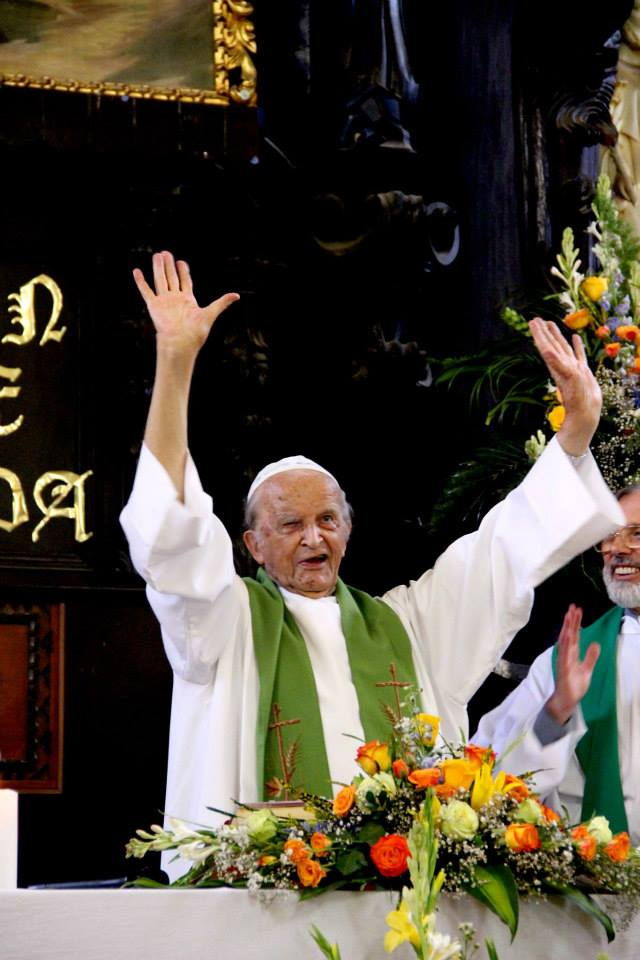
Ugo De Censi (1924-2018) in 2013

Ugo De Censi Scarafoni (January 26, 1924, in Polaggia – December 2, 2018, in Lima) was an Italian Salesian priest, Peruvian citizen, and the founder of Operazione Mato Grosso (Operation Mato Grosso). He served as the parish priest of San Martin Pope Chacas, Ancash, Asunción, Peru, from 1976 until his death.

== Biography ==
Ugo De Censi was born on January 26, 1924, in Polaggia, Berbenno di Valtellina, Italy. From a humble family, he is the second of six siblings born from the marriage between Vincenzo Scarafoni and Orsola. At the age of nine years, he was enrolled with his brother Ferruccio to a Salesian College in a neighboring province, across the river Adda. That's where they decided to become Salesians.

In 1940 his father went to World War II and his mother died. Ugo was hospitalized for several years at the Santa Corona hospital near Genoa because of Pott's disease. Then, during a pilgrimage to Lourdes, it is said his conditions improved dramatically and he completed his studies and graduated in theology and political science to be ordained a priest on March 8, 1951.

A very important part of his life was when he stayed at the Salesian house in Arese, where he worked for nearly twenty years. In 1965 he participated in the XIX chapter of the Salesian and he met Pedro Melesi who was the Salesian ambassador for Latin America. Melesi told De Censi of the difficult situation he worked in at Poxoreo, Brazil, and De Censi invited him to stay at his Arese house. In the summer of 1966, De Censi and other volunteers went to give a hand to Melesi, and in the following year they built a youth centre there.

Due to the success of his mission, De Censi established the Operazione Mato Grosso (named after the state in which Poxoreo is). For a decade De Censi followed his fellow volunteers across the Atlantic Ocean, from Italy to South America. He moved to Peru, in Chacas, so he could give more concrete help to the inhabitants.

In 1979 he founded the first school for wood carving, dedicated to Don Bosco, who recruits children based on their poverty and good will. The school lasts for five years and grants room and board and education. Because of the success of these schools, De Censi also created some for girls.

He also built a hospital thanks to the money raised by the Operazione Mato Grosso, and was helped by the Archdiocese of Milan to complete a home for the elderly in Pomallucay which was inaugurated by Carlo Maria Martini.
