= Paccharaju =

Mountain in Peru

- Rocotuyo - Rayococha
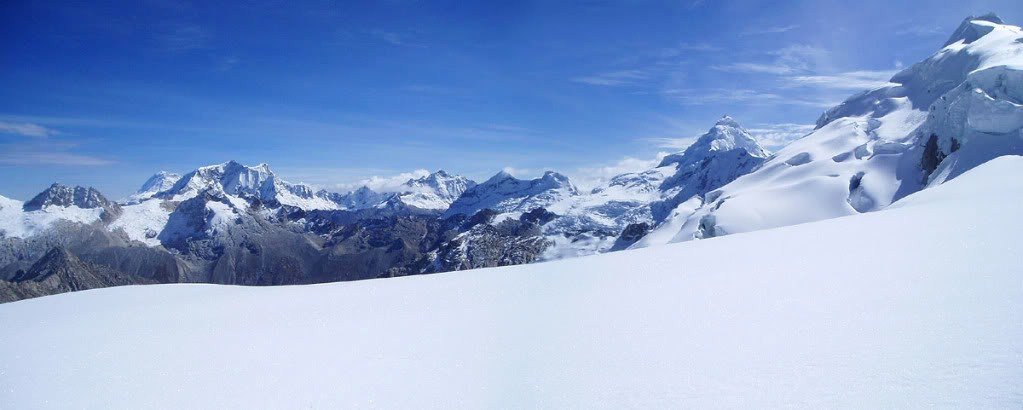
- Paccharaju (center) as seen from the south

Highest point
- Elevation: 5,749 m (18,862 ft)
- Coordinates: 9°16′33″S 77°25′57″W

Geography
- Location within Peru
- Location: Ancash, Peru
- Parent range: Andes, Cordillera Blanca

Paccharaju (possibly from Ancash Quechua paqtsa waterfall, rahu snow mountain, "waterfall snow peak") is a mountain of 5,744 m (18,845 ft) (or 5,749 m (18,862 ft)) of elevation in the Cordillera Blanca in the Andes of Peru. In other maps it is shown as comprising two peaks: Rocotuyo (possibly from Quechua rukutu, ruqutu a plant (Capsicum pubescens), -yuq a suffix to indicate ownership, "the one with the rukutu") of 5,749 m (18,862 ft) and Rayococha (or Bayoraju) of 5,460 m (17,913 ft). It is located between the provinces of Asunción Province and Carhuaz, in Ancash; southwest of mount Tarush Kancha, inside Huascarán National Park.

Rocotuyo (also named Paccharuri) is a lake at 9°16′53″S 77°27′12″W south of the mountain.
