= Copap =

Mountain in Peru

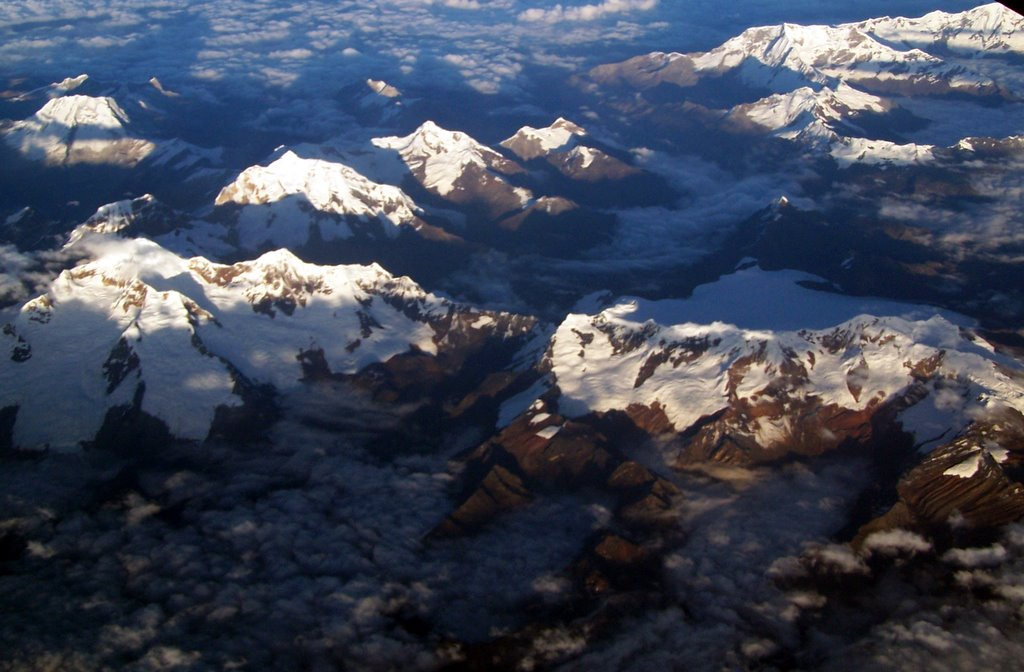
- Copap (center-right) as seen from above

Highest point
- Elevation: 5,570 m (18,270 ft)
- Listing: List of mountains in the Andes
- Coordinates: 9°17′S 77°20′W

Geography
- Location within Peru
- Location: Peru
- Parent range: Andes, Cordillera Blanca

Copap (possibly from Quechua qupa the mineral turquoise and the turquoise color, -p a suffix,) is a mountain in the Cordillera Blanca in the Andes of Peru whose summit reaches about 5,570 metres (18,274 ft) or 5,579 metres (18,304 ft) above sea level depending on the source. It is located in Chacas District, Asunción Province, Ancash; in the same massif as Perlilla which belongs to the glacial system of Copap.

In 1998, it was reported to have the longest glacier in the Cordillera Blanca range (7 kilometres (4 mi)).

== See also ==
- Yanacocha
