= Tarushcancha =

Mountain in Peru

- Chaqchipuncu
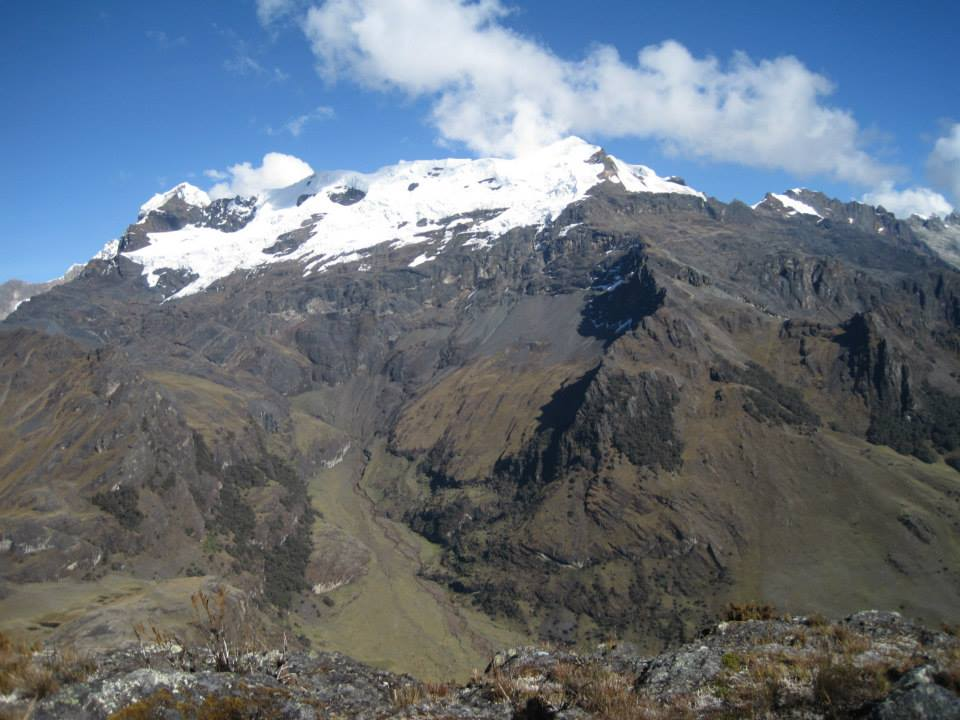

Highest point
- Elevation: 5,345 m (17,536 ft)
- Coordinates: 9°15′45″S 77°24′09″W

Geography
- Location within Peru
- Location: Peru, Ancash Region
- Parent range: Andes, Cordillera Blanca

Tarushcancha (Ancash Quechua taruka, tarush deer, kancha corral, "deer corral") or Chaqchipuncu is a 5,345-metre-high (17,536 ft) mountain in the Cordillera Blanca in the Andes of Peru. It is situated in the Ancash Region, Asunción Province, Chacas District. Tarushcancha lies in Huascarán National Park, northeast of Atlante and southeast of Yacuihuarmi.

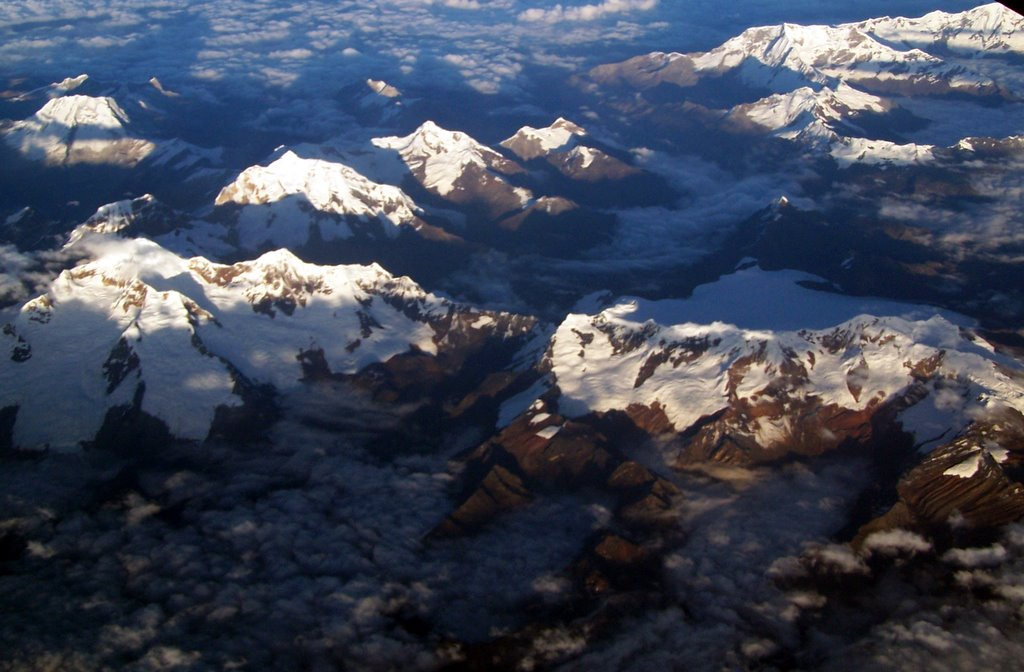
Aerial view of the Cordillera Blanca as seen from the east with Tarush Kancha in the upper right part of the image
