= Runtococha =

Lake in Peru

- Location within Peru
- Location: Peru; Ancash Region
- Coordinates: 9°14′24″S 77°20′36″W
- Max. length: 325 m (1,066 ft)
- Max. width: 234 m (768 ft)
- Surface elevation: 4,386 m (14,390 ft)

Runtococha (possibly from in the Quechua spelling Runtuqucha; runtu egg, qucha lake, "egg lake", hispanicized spelling Runtococha) is a lake in the Cordillera Blanca in the Andes of Peru located in the Ancash Region, Asunción Province, Chacas District. It is situated at a height of 4,386 metres (14,390 ft), 325 m long and 234 m at its widest point. Runtococha lies northeast of the lake Yanacocha and east of the lake Huegroncocha.
