= Acochaca District =

Coordinates: 8°31′59″S 77°52′59″W

Acochaca Aquchaka
- District
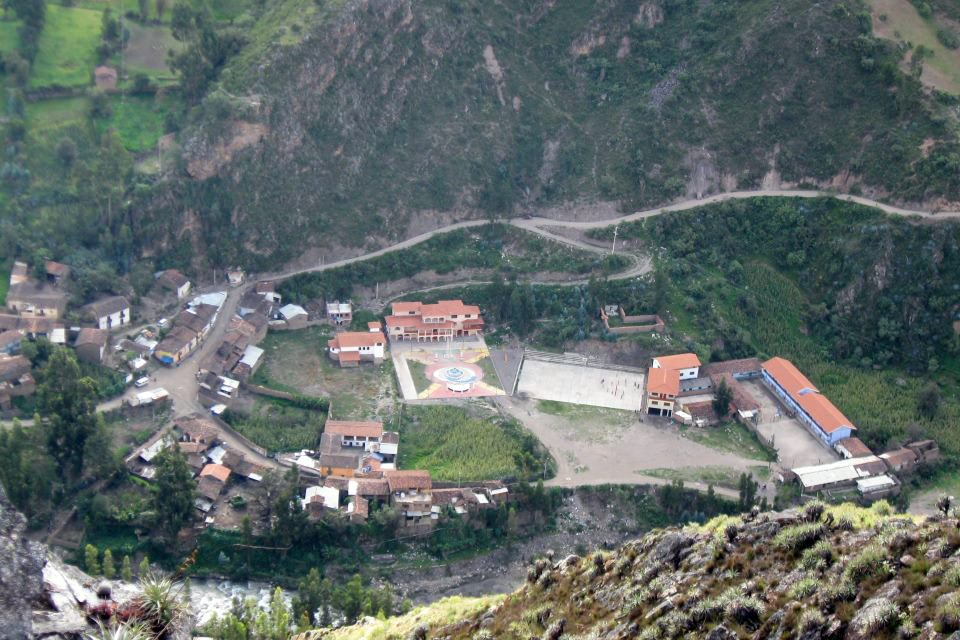

- Coat of arms
- Interactive map of Acochaca
- Country: Peru
- Region: Ancash
- Province: Asunción
- Founded: December 30, 1983
- Capital: Acochaca

Government
  - Mayor: Edgar Benedicto Arce Ramirez

Area
  - Total: 80.97 km^{2} (31.26 sq mi)
- Elevation: 3,350 m (10,990 ft)

Population (2005 census)
  - Total: 4,079
  - Density: 50.38/km^{2} (130.5/sq mi)
- Time zone: UTC-5 (PET)
- UBIGEO: 020402
- Website: muniacochaca.gob.pe

Acochaca or Aquchaka (Quechua aqu sand, chaka bridge, "sand bridge") is one of two districts of the province Asunción in Peru.

== Ethnic groups ==
The people in the district are mainly indigenous citizens of Quechua descent. Quechua is the language which the majority of the population (92.67%) learnt to speak in childhood, 6.99% of the residents started speaking using the Spanish language (2007 Peru Census).

== See also ==
- Ancash Quechua
