= Perlilla =

Mountain in Peru

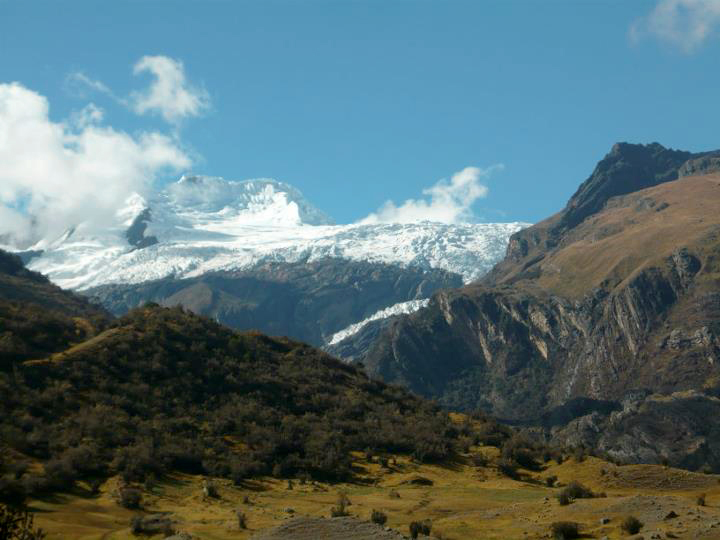
- View of Perlilla N

Highest point
- Elevation: 5,587 m (18,330 ft)
- Coordinates: 9°18′16″S 77°19′7″W

Geography
- Location within Peru
- Location: Ancash Region, Asunción, Carhuaz, Huari
- Parent range: Cordillera Blanca

Geology
- Rock age: Tertiary
- Mountain type: granite

Climbing
- First ascent: July 14, 1966
- Easiest route: North glacier

Perlilla is a mountain of 5587 m in the Cordillera Blanca range, a part of the Peruvian Andes. It lies within the provinces of Asunción, Carhuaz and Huari. Its eastern summit (5,587) is located in the Huari Province.

The peak was climbed for the first time on July 14, 1966, by M. Ishinabe, A. Kurihara, A. Miyahara, S. Ooe and T. Suzuki).

== Features ==
Perlilla has an area a bit greater than 30 km², 90% of its surface is accessible without much difficulty from the town of Chacas. The 14 km² of snow surface at its northern part are suitable for the practice of winter sports because the slopes do not exceed 50°.

Due to its latitude (9 ° 18'16 "S) so close to the equator, could be considered the ski center at higher altitudes closer to Ecuador, surpassing the Chacaltaya Bolivian track for its vast area of 3000 snowfall hectares and its enormous potential for the development of winter sports.

The beauty of its surroundings comprises the following natural attractions:

- Yanaqucha
- Paqarisha Lake
- Ventanilla Lake
- Quebrada Honda
- Quebrada Ashnuwana
- Juytush River

== Gallery ==
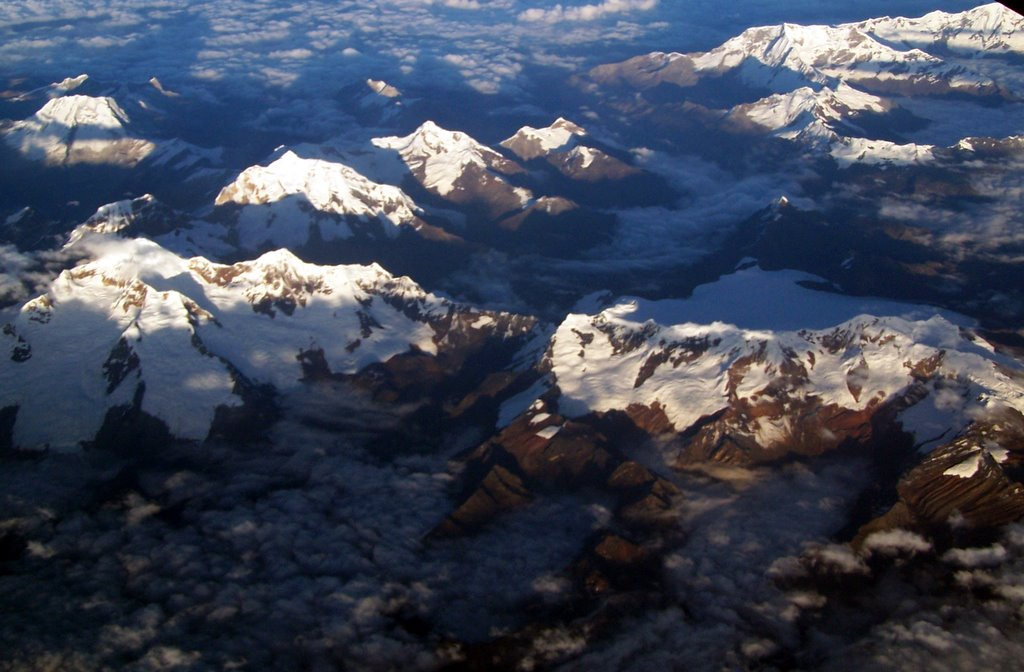
Aerial view of Mount Perlilla, south-east (bottom right)

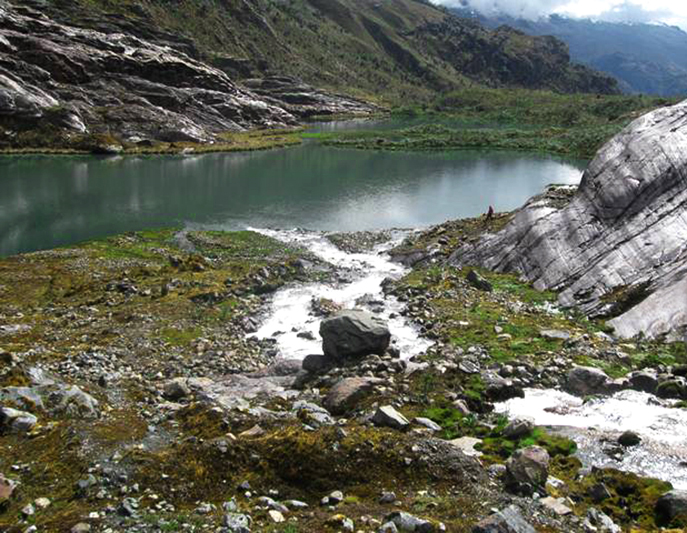
Paqarisha Lake, in the foothills of Mount Perlilla

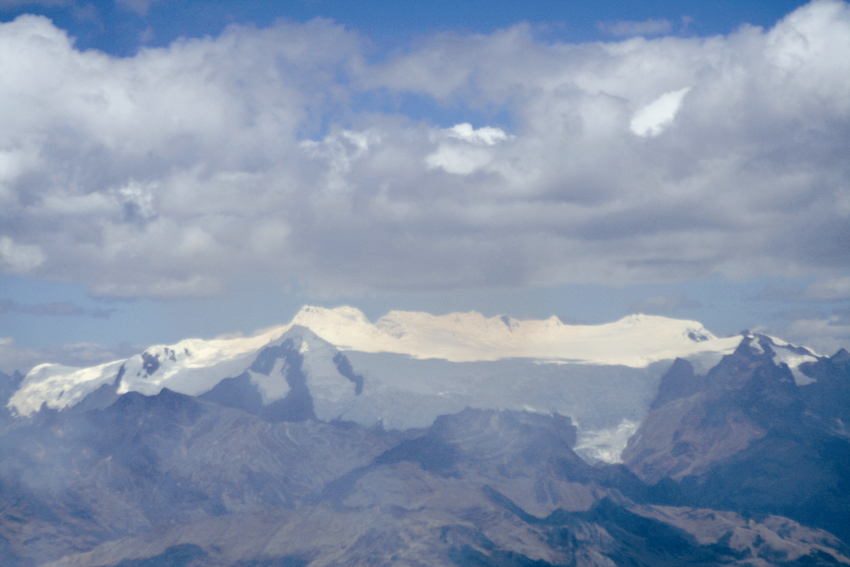
Mount Perlilla

== See also ==
- Copap
