= Huacramarca =

Archaeological site in Peru

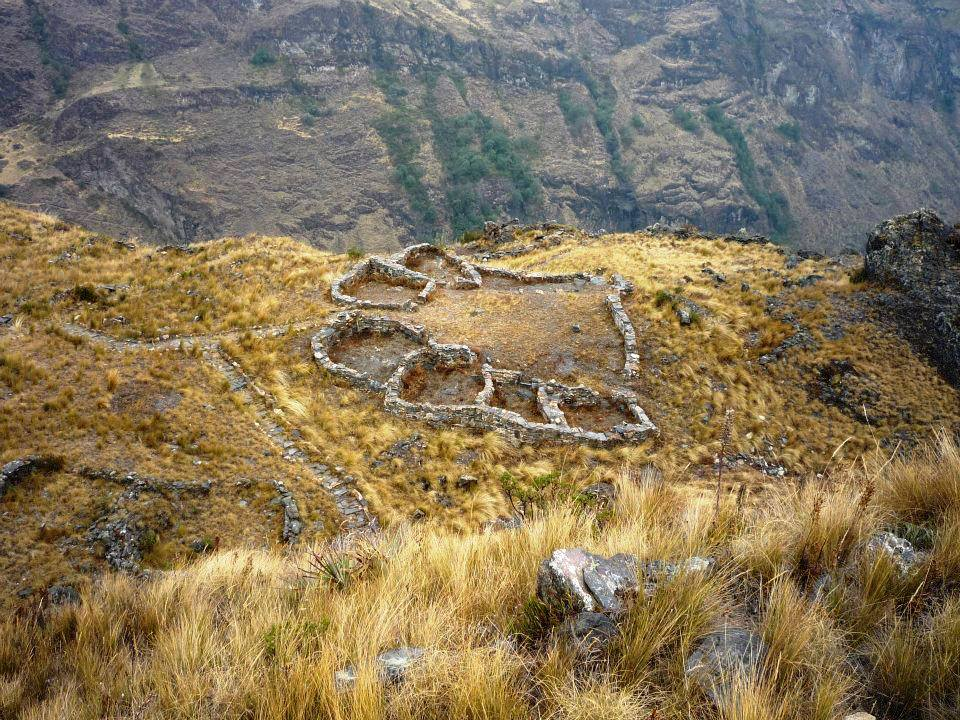
- View of Huacramarca.

- Location within Peru
- 9.1754411°S 77.4332291°W
- Location: Peru
- Region: Ancash

Site notes
- Elevation: 4,150 metres (13,615 ft).

Huacramarca or Waqramarka (possibly from Quechua waqra horn, marka village) is an archaeological site on a mountain of the same name in Peru. Huacramarca lies southeast of Contrahierbas, near the village Huallin (located in the Ancash Region, Asunción Province, Chacas District). The ruins are situated on top of the mountain Huacramarca at an elevation of 4,150 metres (13,615 ft).

== Images ==
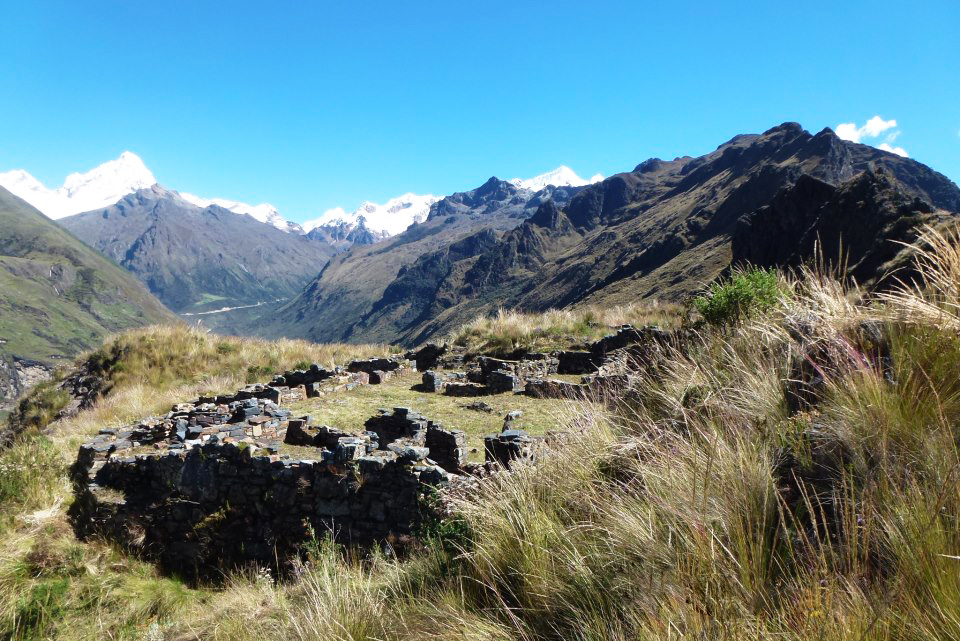
Huacramarca with the Cordillera Blanca and the mountains Hualcán and Contrahierbas in the background
