= Lauricocha (Ancash) =

Lake in Peru

- Location within Peru
- Location: Peru; Ancash Region
- Coordinates: 9°17′09″S 77°21′34″W
- Max. length: 561 m (1,841 ft)
- Max. width: 204 m (669 ft)
- Surface elevation: 4,550 m (14,930 ft)

Lauricocha (possibly from in the Quechua spelling Lawriqucha;lawri bluish, Quechua qucha lake, lagoon, "bluish lake") is a lake in the Cordillera Blanca in the Andes of Peru. It is located in the Ancash Region, Asunción Province, Chacas District. Lauricocha lies south-west of the lake Yanacocha, south of Paqarisha Lake and north-east of the mountain Pomabamba.
