= Yanacocha (Asunción) =

Lake in Peru

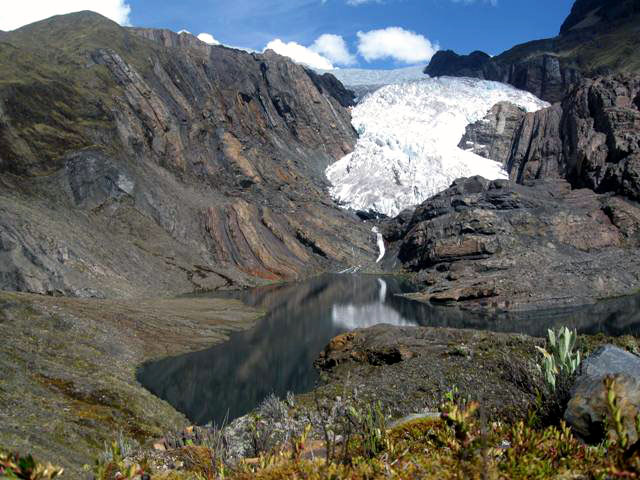

- Location within Peru
- Location: Peru; Ancash Region
- Coordinates: 9°16′05″S 77°21′00″W
- Max. length: 470 m (1,540 ft)
- Max. width: 161 m (528 ft)
- Surface elevation: 4,250 m (13,940 ft)

Yanacocha (possibly from in the Quechua spelling Yanaqucha; yana black, very dark, qucha lake, "black lake") is a lake in the Cordillera Blanca in the Andes of Peru located in Chacas District, Asunción Province, Ancash Region. It is situated at a height of about 4,250 metres (13,944 ft), about 470 m long and 161 m at its widest point. Yanacocha lies north-west of the mountain Perlilla, north-east of the mountain Pomabamba, south-west of the lakes Huegroncocha and Runtococha and north-east of the lakes Lauricocha and Paqarisha.

== See also ==
- Copap
