= Contrahierbas =

Mountain in Peru

- Yanarraju, Ruricocha
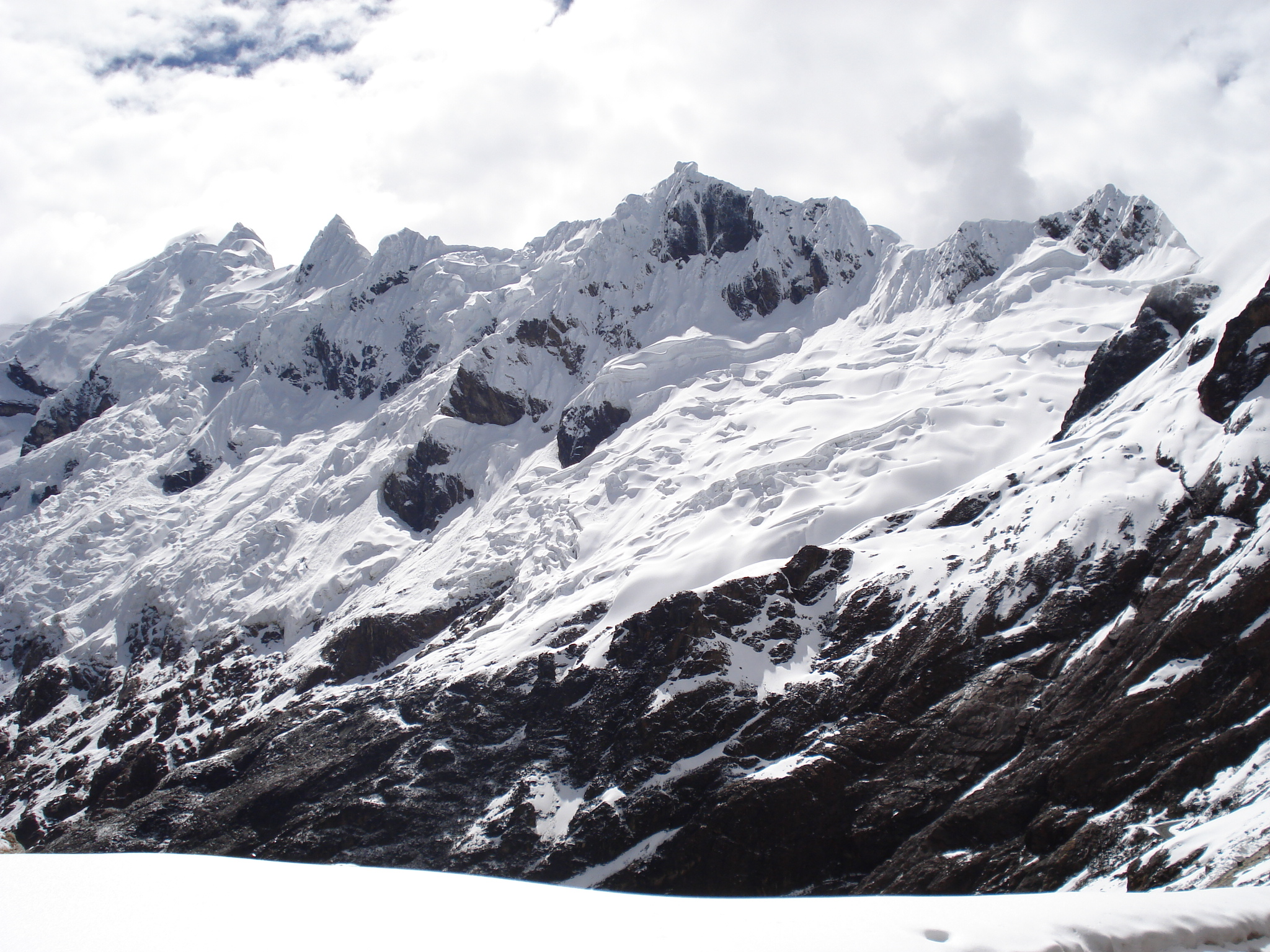

Highest point
- Elevation: 5,954 m (19,534 ft)
- Coordinates: 9°06′22″S 77°29′25″W

Geography
- Location within Peru
- Location: Ancash, Peru
- Parent range: Andes, Cordillera Blanca

Contrahierbas, also called Yanarraju (possibly from Quechua yana black, rahu snow, ice, mountain with snow) or Ruricocha (possibly from Quechua ruri inside, Ancash Quechua ruri interior; inside; deep; valley or little river; qucha lake), is a mountain in the Cordillera Blanca in the Andes of Peru, about 5,954 metres (19,534 ft) high. It is situated in the Ancash Region in the provinces Asunción, Carhuaz and Yungay. Contrahierbas is located inside Huascarán National Park, northeast of Hualcán.

== See also ==
- Quishuar (archaeological site)
- Huacramarca
- Yanarraju Lake
