= Asunción province =

Coordinates: 9°09′33″S 77°21′51″W

Asunción
- Province
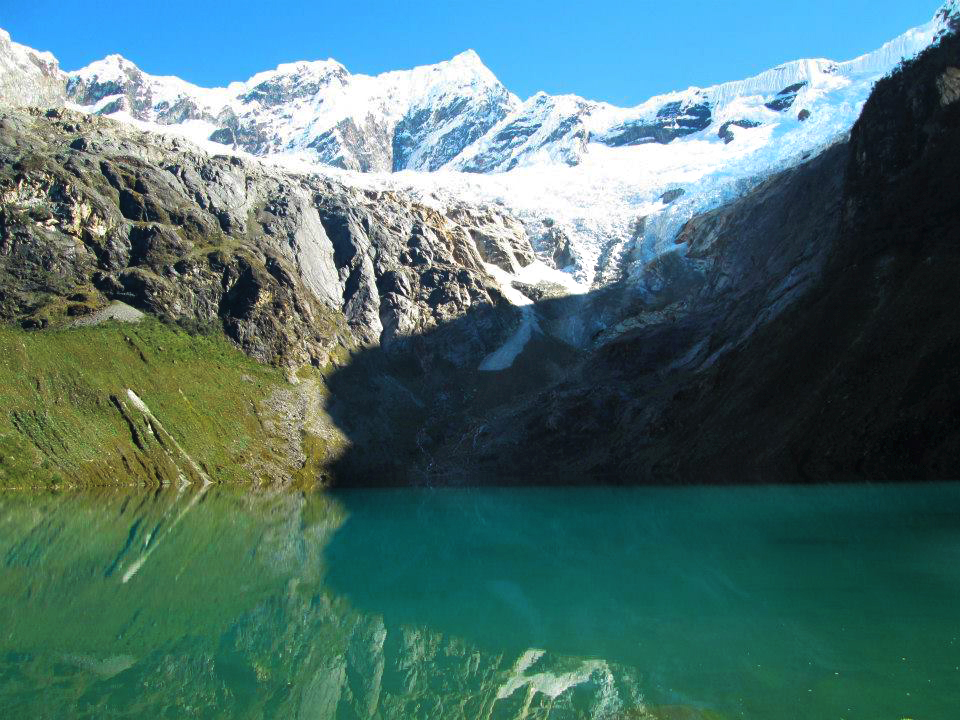
- Yanarahu Lake

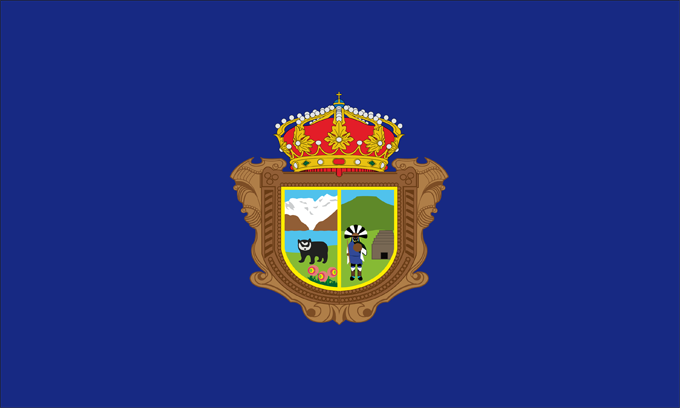
- Flag Coat of arms

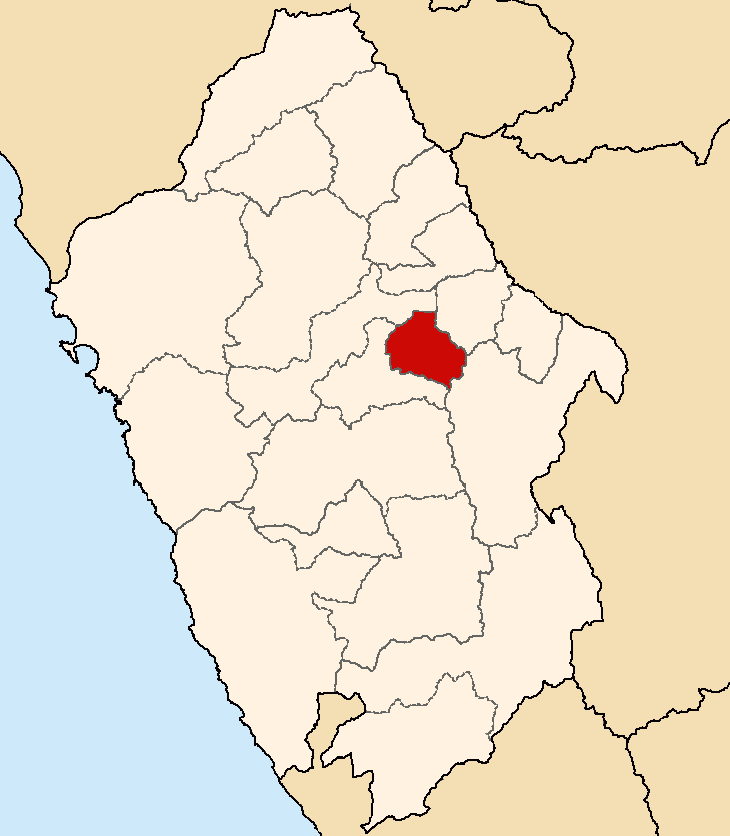
- Location of Asunción in the Ancash Region
- Country: Peru
- Region: Ancash
- Founded: 1983
- Capital: Chacas

Government
  - Mayor: Jesus Zaragoza Guzman (2019–2022)

Area
  - Total: 529 km^{2} (204 sq mi)

Population
  - Total: 7,378
  - Density: 13.9/km^{2} (36.1/sq mi)
- Website: www.munichacas.gob.pe

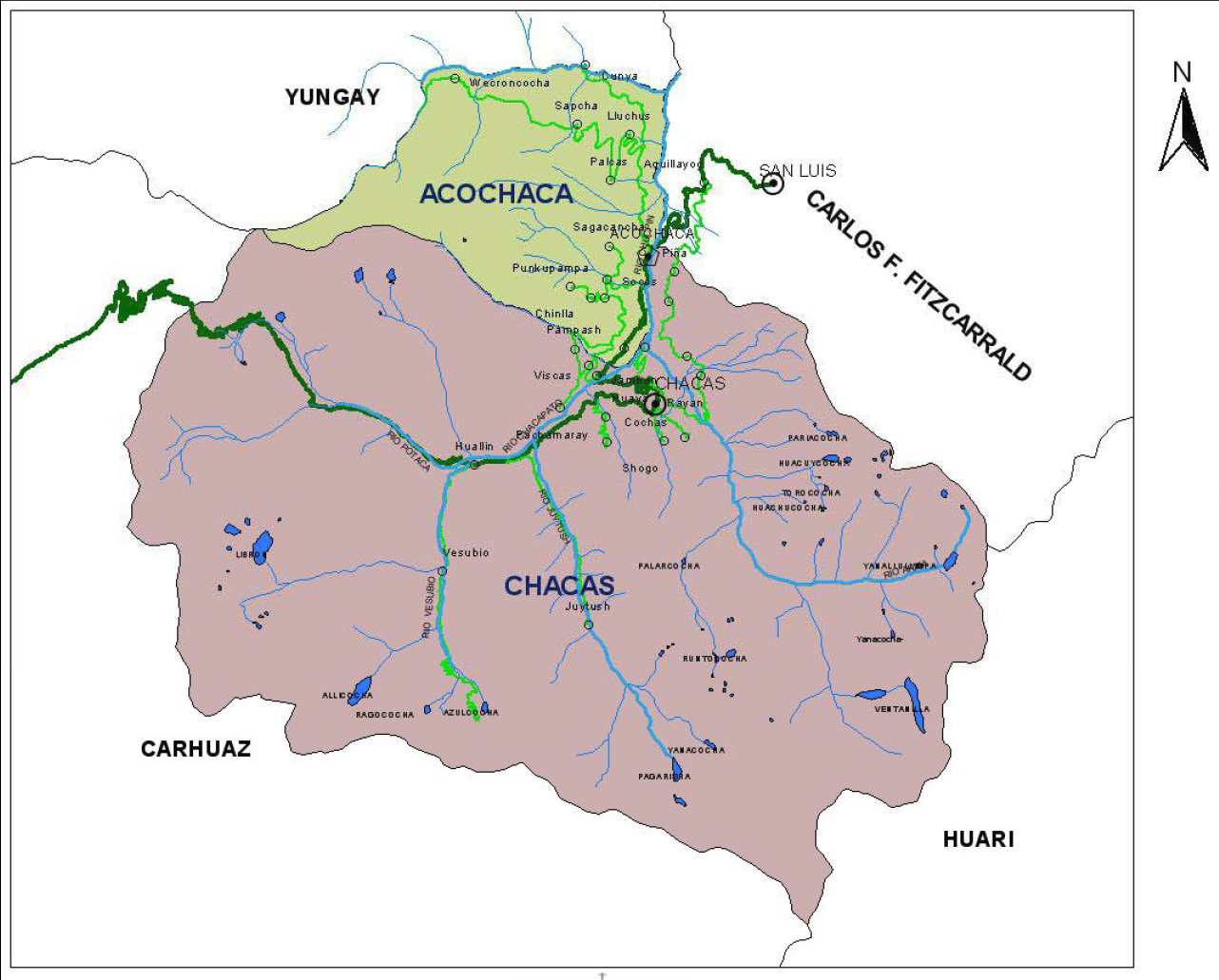
Political map of the province of Asunción

Asunción is one of the 20 provinces of the Ancash Region in Peru. One of the smallest provinces of the region, it is located in the heart of the region's central highlands, on the eastern slopes of the Cordillera Blanca, in the eastern area of the Ancash Region at a distance of 121 km from the city of Huaraz, the capital of the region, and 521 km from the city of Lima. Chacas, the capital of the province, is located about 3,350 m high in the midst of extremely rugged terrain.

The province is bounded to the north by the province of Yungay, to the east by the provinces of Carlos Fermín Fitzcarrald and Huari, and to the south and west by the province of Carhuaz.

== Political division ==
Asunción is divided into two districts, Acochaca and Chacas.

== Geography ==
The province of Asunción has a land area of 528.66 km² which represents 1.47% of the territory of the Ancash Region. The district of Chacas has an area of 447.69 km² which represents 85% of the province; the district of Acochaca has an area of 80.97 km², equivalent to 15% of the province.

According to Javier Pulgar Vidal, Asunción has the following natural regions:

- Quechua: ranges from its lowest point, which is in the course of the river in the district Acochaca waters north to 2,500 m and the climate is generally temperate semi, thus characterized by having large plots of fruit trees in the vicinity of Acochaca.

The provincial capital is located in Chacas the top of this region at 3,359 m. The climate is more varied, from intense heat during periods of drought to a biting cold, with rainy and chilly winds at night in June and July, so by the influence of the circulating Suni region.

- Suni or Jalca: located on the eastern slope of the Cordillera Blanca, from 3,500 m to 4,000 m. The relief is generally steep, although there are some stretches of a plain called pampa, as in the path to Patarqucha, Juytush, Camchas Cruz Pampa and other places. Its soil is conducive to the cultivation of potatoes and other tubers. Typical plants of this region are kiswar, elderberry, cantuta, quinoa, beans, tawri.
- Janca: begins at a height of 4,800 m. Asunción has the privilege of sharing the Cordillera Blanca in its eastern slope with peaks above 5,000 m in the province.

In this geographical context, Asunción offers a microclimate for other media, cold during the southern summer rainfall (November to March), although the rains usually extend to other stations for being here in the Sierra north near the jalcas, days of intense solar heat during the months of May, June, July, August and mid September.

The province consists sloping land that are part of the Andean flanks delimiting with other provinces and are of rugged topography, the soils are moderately deep to shallow, medium to low fertility, with both coarse fragments in the profile and on the surface thereof, are highly erodible. The normal topography is undulating, of slopes ranging from gentle to steep in some areas (especially in the upper parts of Chacas) has plenty of stones on the surface and are of variable shape. The soils are of residual-colluvial parent material which are igneous rocks; grained diorite and shale. Within the area are three different physiographic landscapes: rivers, hills and mountains, the same that characterize the Asunción Province.

- Landscape fluvial: Formed by recent deposits left by the action of the main rivers and smaller tributaries that exist in the area, the terraced landscape is typified by short, narrow configuration, flat, with slopes of less than 15°; brings good soils agricultural potential, which are the best land, but of small size, this feature is presented in the lower (north) of Chaco and almost all the territory it occupies Acochaca district.
- Hilly landscape: It is characterized by wavy surfaces of varying height and located primarily in the higher altitudes. It includes mild to moderately steep hills of agricultural and related uses mostly devoted to grazing. Characterization corresponding to Chacas District.
- Mountainous landscape: It is the largest, consists of sloping land which is part of the Andean slopes bounding the province (especially Carhuaz) and are of rugged topography, the soils are moderately deep to shallow, low fertility and are highly erodible.

Some of the highest peaks of the province are Wallqan and Yanarahu. Other mountains are listed below:

- Artisayuq
- Chawpi Hirka
- Kanchas
- Palta Hirka
- Paqtsarahu
- Perlilla
- Puka Allpa
- Pumapampa
- Qaqapampa
- Qupa
- Qupap
- Tarush Kancha
- Tarush Wachanan
- Tayan Qucha
- Uturunku
- Waychu Hirka
- Yakuy Warmi
- Yawina

== Gallery ==
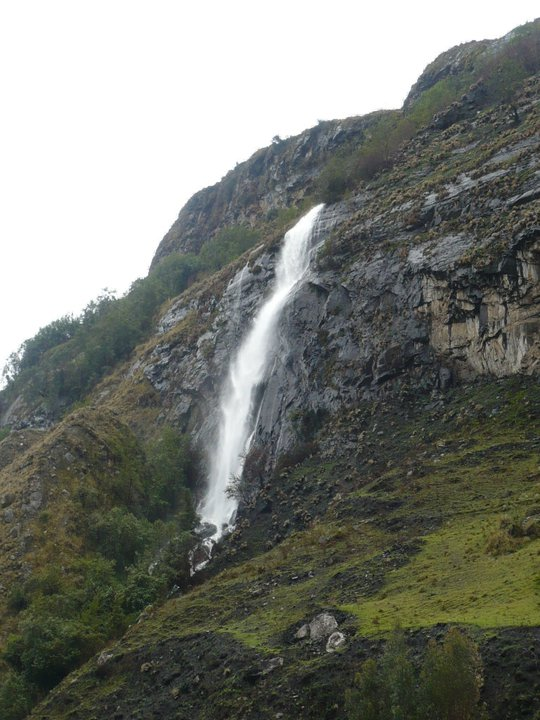
Waqramarka waterfall, 12 km west of Chacas, especially to practice canyoning and abseiling

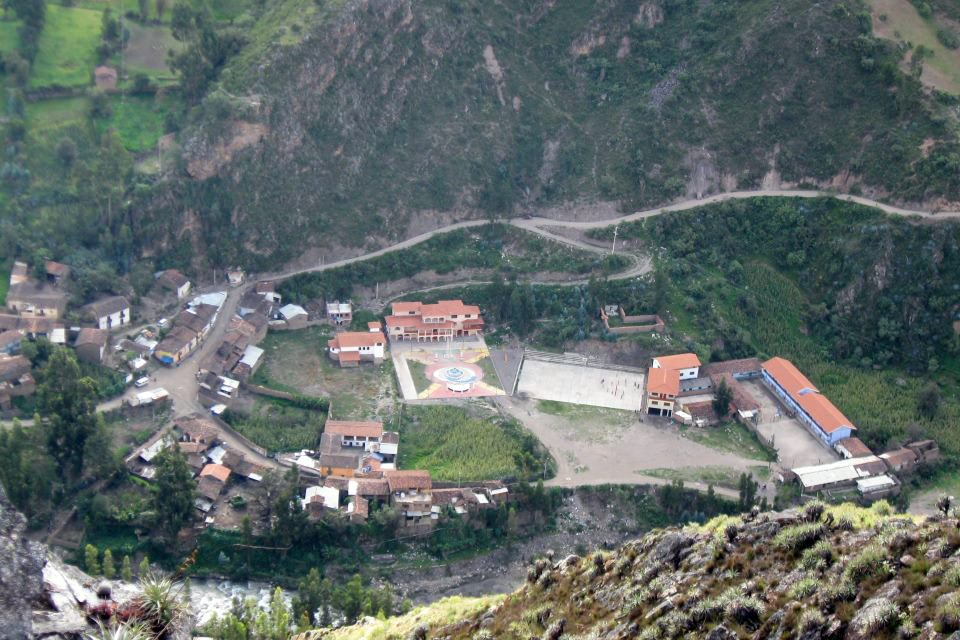
Acochaca (Aquchaka)

== See also ==
- Paryaqucha
- Runtuqucha
- Waqramarka
- Wiqrunqucha
- Yanaqucha
- Yanarahu Lake
