= List of first ascents in the Cordillera Blanca =

The following list summarizes notable first ascents of mountains and peaks in the Cordillera Blanca in the Andes of Ancash, Peru, in chronological order.

| Date | Peak | Height (m) | Height (ft) | Route | Climbers | Nationality | Ref |
|---|---|---|---|---|---|---|---|
| 2 Sep 1908 | Huascaran N. | 6655 | 21,834 | | Annie Smith Peck, Gabriel Zumtaugwald and Rudolf Taugwalder | (Switzerland) (United States) | |
| 20 Jul 1932 | Huascaran S. | 6746 | 22,132 | Garganta and the NW-face | Franz Bernard, Phillip Borchers, Erwin Hein, Hermann Hoerlin, and Erwin Schneider | (Austria) (Germany) | |
| 3 Aug 1932 | Chopicalqui | 6345 | 20,846 | Southwest Ridge | Phillip Borchers, Erwin Hein, Hermann Hoerlin, and Erwin Schneider | (Austria) (Germany) | |
| 19 Aug 1932 | Artesonraju | 6025 | 19,767 | Northeast spur and North Ridge | Erwin Hein and Erwin Schneider | (Austria) (Germany) | |
| 12 Sep 1932 | Huandoy N. | 6395 | 20,866 | Southern Slopes | Erwin Hein and Erwin Schneider | (Austria) | |
| 17 Jul 1936 | Quitaraju | 6036 | 19,820 | West Ridge | Erwin Schneider and Arnold Awerzger | (Germany) | |
| 25 Jun 1939 | Ranrapalca | 6162 | 20,217 | Northeast ridge | Walter Brecht, Siegfried Rohrer, Karl Schmid y Hans Schweizer | (Germany) | |
| 31 Jul 1939 | Tocllaraju | 6034 | 19,797 | Northwest Ridge | Walter Brecht and Hans Schweizer | (Germany) | |
| Aug 1939 | Hualcán N. | 6122 | 20,085 | South Ridge | Siegfried Rohrer and Karl Schmid | (Germany) | |
| 20 Jul 1948 | Santa Cruz | 6241 | 20,535 | Northeastern face | Frédéric Marmillod and Ali Szepessy-Schaurek | (Hungary) (Switzerland) | |
| 7 Jul 1952 | Huantsán | 6369 | 20,896 | North-Northwest Ice Ridge (from Huantsan North) | Lionel Terray, Cees G. Egeler and Tom de Booy | (France) (Netherlands) | |
| 31 Jul 1956 | Chacraraju West | 6112 | 20,039 | Northeastern Face | Lionel Terray, Maurice Davaille, Claude Gaudin, Pierre Souriac, Robert Sennelier | (France) | |
| 20 Jun 1957 | Alpamayo | 5947 | 19,511 | South Ridge | Günter Hauser, Berhard Huhn, Frieder Knauss, and Horst Wiedmann | (West Germany) | |
| 24 Jul 1962 | Tullparaju | 5787 | 18,986 | West Ridge | David Bernays, Leif-Norman Patterson and Charles Sawyer | (United States) | |
| 2007 | Huaytapallana I | 5557 | 18,232 | Northwest Face | Jim Sykes, Anthony Barton | (United States) (United Kingdom) | |
| 24 Jul 2008 | Huaytapallana II | 5025 | 16,486 | North Ridge | Anthony Barton, Olly Metherell | (United Kingdom) | |

== See also ==
- List of highest mountains

== Notes ==
- Juanjo Tomé, Escaladas en los Andes - Guía de la Cordillera Blanca, Madrid: Desnivel Ediciones, 1999, ISBN 978-8489969438
- Lefebvre, Thierry, L’invention occidentale de la haute montagne andine, M@ppemonde Vol. 19 (2005).
- Frederick L. Wolfe, High Summits: 370 Famous Peak First Ascents and Other Significant Events in Mountaineering History, Hugo House Publishers, 2013, ISBN 1936449358 (for a guideline; the book contains many major errors)
