= Cordillera Blanca =

Mountain range in Peru; part of the Andes

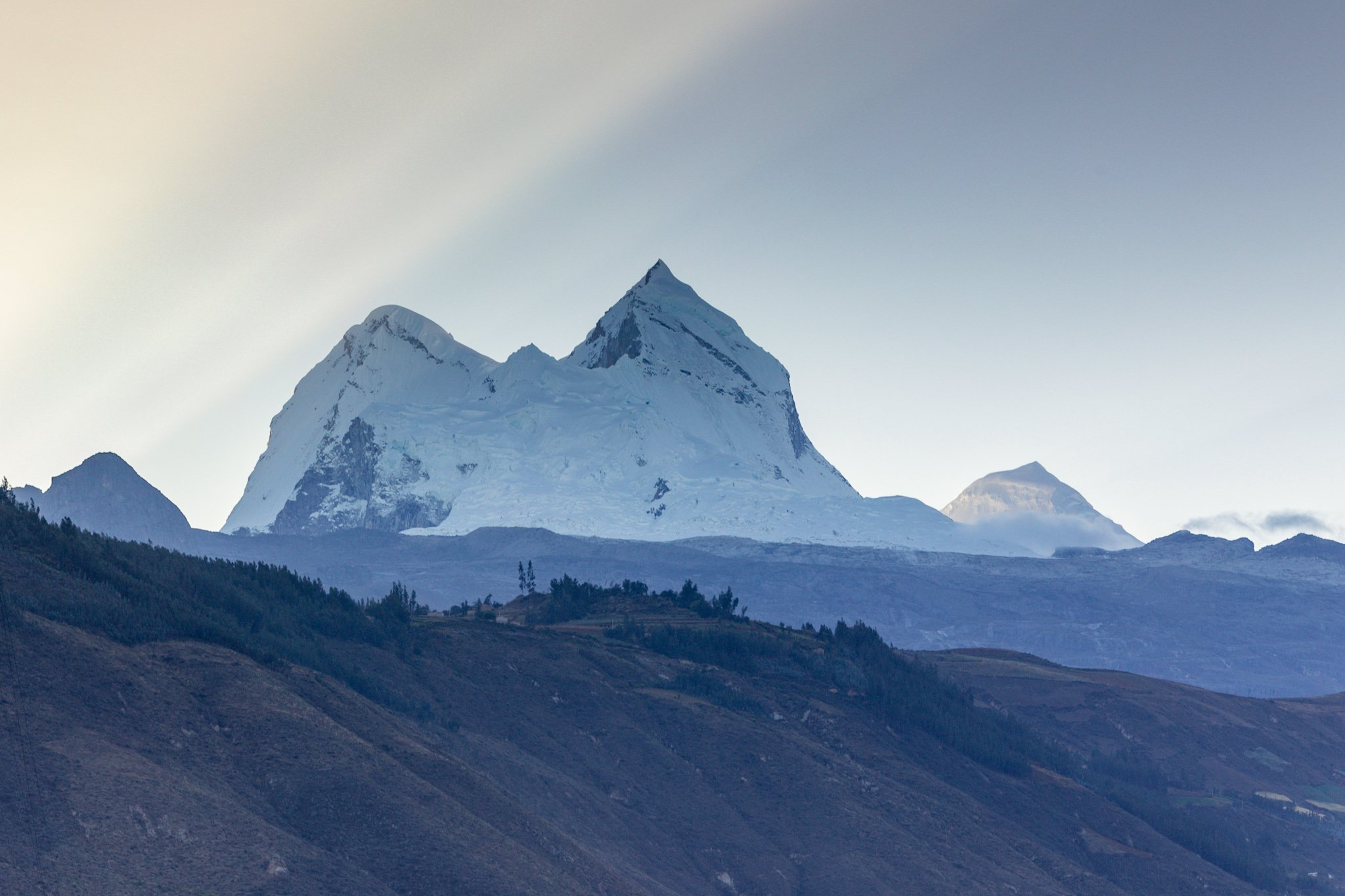
- Huandoy (6,360 m)

Highest point
- Peak: Huascarán
- Elevation: 6,768 m (22,205 ft)
- Coordinates: 9°07′17″S 77°36′32″W

Dimensions
- Length: 180 km (110 mi) N-S
- Width: 21 km (13 mi)

Geography
- Location within Peru
- Country: Peru
- Region: Ancash
- Range coordinates: 9°10′S 77°35′W
- Parent range: Cordillera Occidental (Peru) in the Andes

The Cordillera Blanca (Spanish for "white range") is a mountain range in Peru that is part of the larger Andes range and extends for 200 kilometres (124 mi) between 8°08' and 9°58'S and 77°00' and 77°52'W, in a northwesterly direction. It includes several peaks over 6,000 metres (19,690 ft) high and 722 individual glaciers. The highest mountain in Peru, Huascarán, at 6,768 metres (22,205 ft) high, is located there.

The Cordillera Blanca lies in the Ancash region and runs parallel to the Santa River valley (also called Callejón de Huaylas in its upper and midsections) on the west. Huascarán National Park, established in 1975, encompasses almost the entire range of the Cordillera Blanca.

Snowmelt from the Cordillera Blanca provides part of northern Peru with its year-round water supply, while 5% of Peru's power comes from a hydro-electrical plant located in the Santa River valley. The area of permanent ice cover shrank by about a third between the 1970s and 2006.

== Geography ==
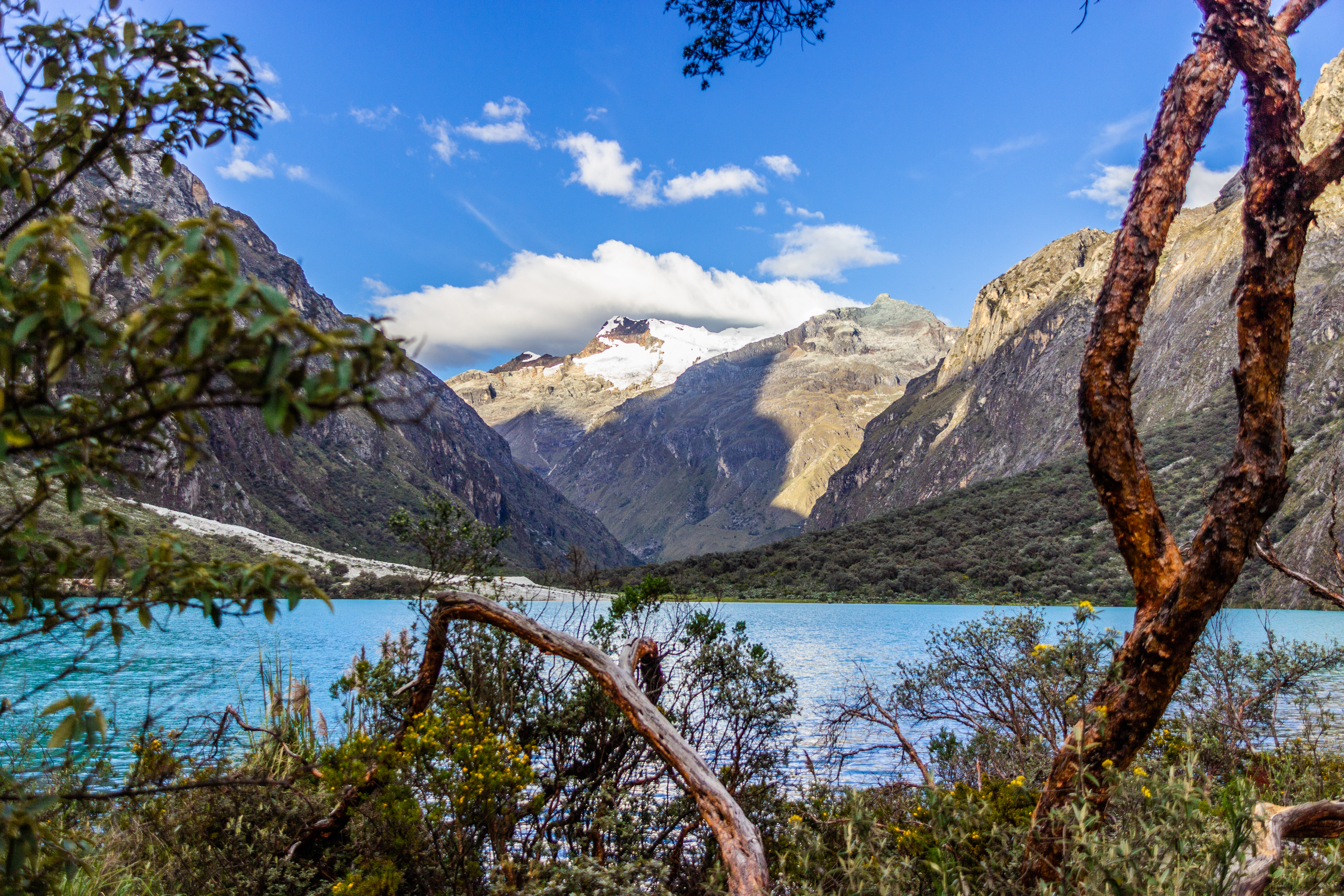
One of the Llanganuco Lakes, with snow-covered Yanapaccha in the background.

The Cordillera Blanca is the most extensive tropical ice-covered mountain range in the world and has the largest concentration of ice in Peru. It is part of the Cordillera Occidental (the westernmost part of the Peruvian Andes), and trends in a northwesterly direction for 200 km between 8°08' and 9°58'S of latitude and 77°00' and 77°52' W of longitude. It has five of the most spectacular peaks above 6,000 m in the Peruvian Andes; the highest peak, Huascarán, rises to an elevation of 6,768 m above sea level. The Cordillera Blanca also acts as a continental divide: the Santa River on the west drains into the Pacific Ocean, whereas the Marañón River on the east drains into the Atlantic Ocean.

=== Glaciers ===
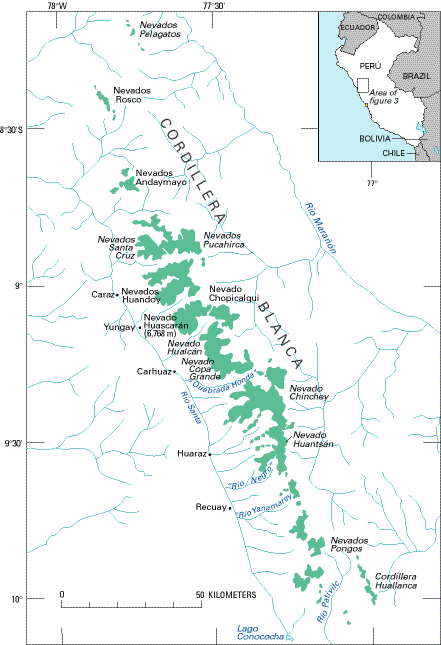

Until the 1990s a total of 722 individual glaciers were recognized in this mountain range, covering an area of 723.4 km^{2}. Most were on the western side of the range, where 530 glaciers covered an area of 507.5 km^{2}, while on the eastern side 192 glaciers covered an area of 215.9 km^{2}. Most of the glaciers, 91% of the total, were classified as mountain glaciers (they are generally short and have extremely steep slopes); the rest were classified as valley glaciers, except for one ice cap.

Like all Andean glaciers, the Cordillera Blanca has witnessed a major retreat of its glaciers during the 20th century due to global climate change. Studies have shown a retreat of over 15% since the 1970s. Based on analysis of satellite imagery, in 2003 there were 485 glaciers left, covering an area of 569.6 km^{2}.

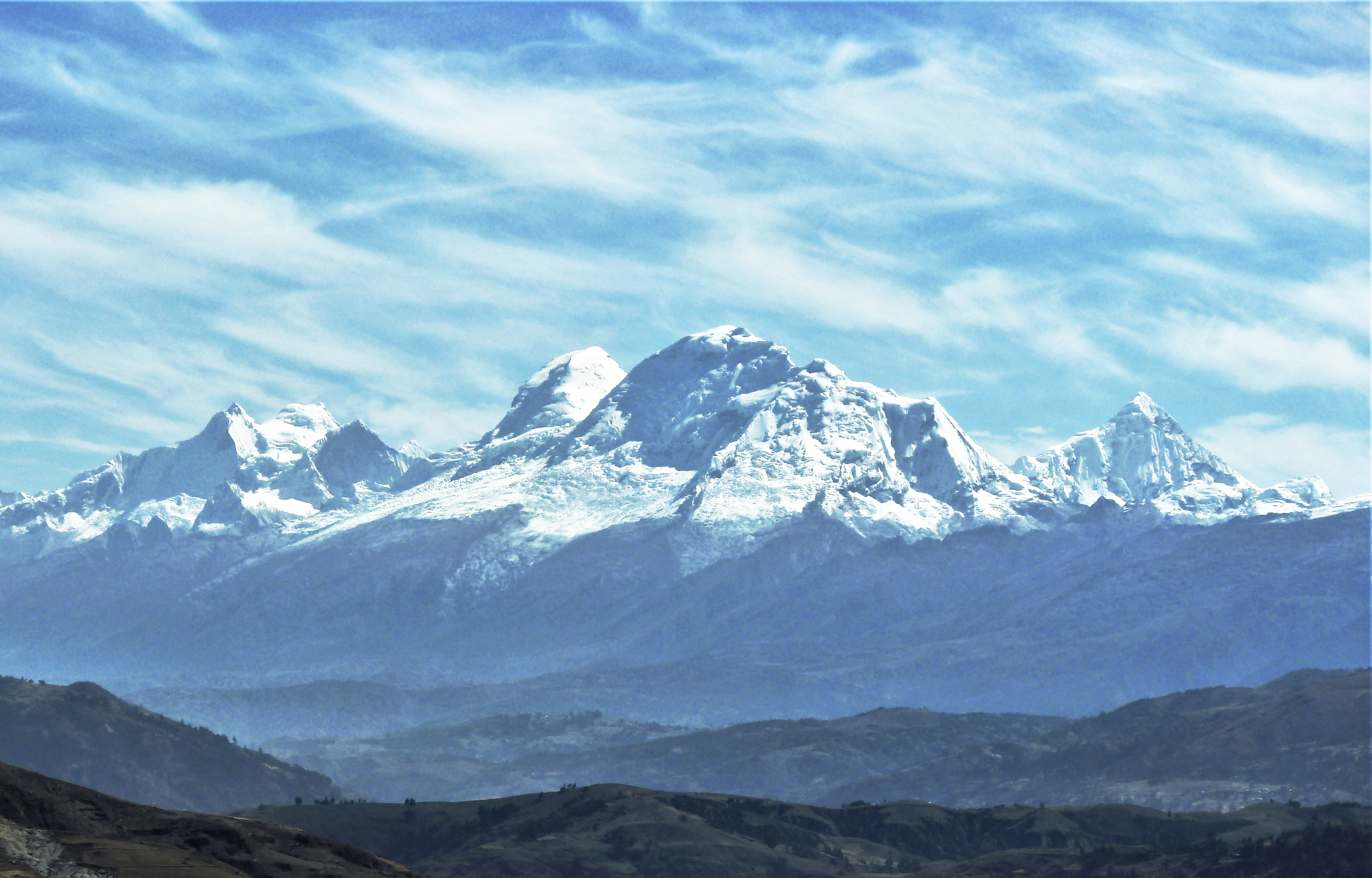
From left to right: Huandoy, Huascarán (highest mountain in the range) and Chopicalqui.

=== Lakes ===
Among the most important lakes in the range are the Llanganuco Lakes, which are located on the northern side of Huascarán, and are accessible from the town of Yungay; the deep-turquoise Lake Parón (the biggest lake in the Cordillera Blanca), located just north of Huandoy, accessible from the town of Caraz; Lakes Ichiccocha and Jatuncocha, which are near Artesonraju and Alpamayo and are accessible only by trekking or on horseback from Caraz.

Some other notable lakes are Lake 69, Lake Allicocha, Lake Auquiscocha, Lake Palcacocha, Lake Querococha, and Lake Conococha.

=== Peaks ===
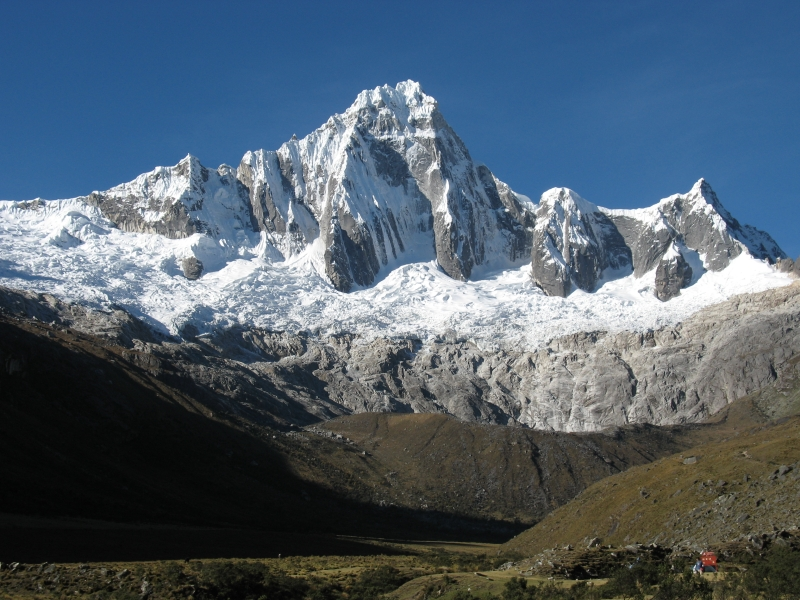
Taulliraju (5830 m)

There are several 6,000 m peaks in the Cordillera Blanca with a 400 m topographic prominence, and several other peaks over 5,500 m. Huascarán Sur, the highest, has two commonly quoted heights: 6,746 m from the Peruvian National Geographic Institute (IGN) map and 6,768 m from the Austrian Alpine Club (OeAV) survey map. Some of the highest peaks in the Cordillera Blanca are listed below.

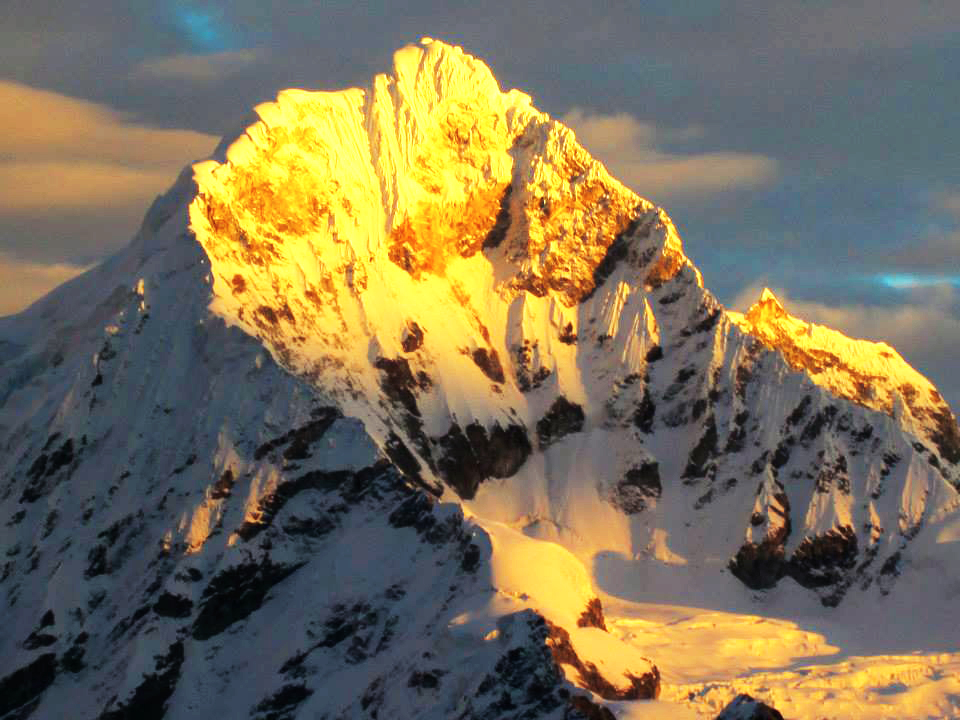
Chopicalqui (6354 m)

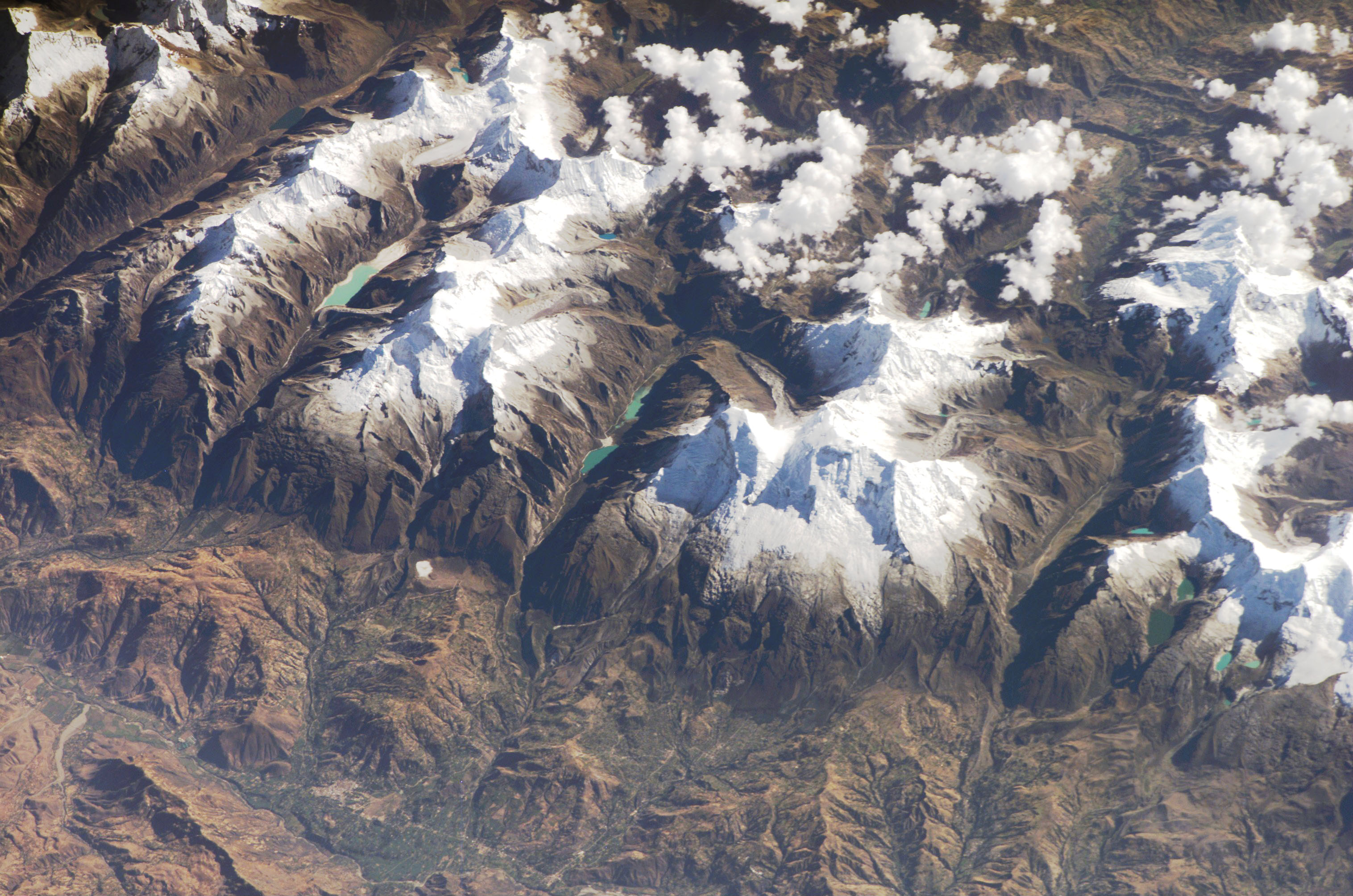
Part of the Cordillera Blanca as seen from the International Space Station in 2006.

- Huascarán, 6,768 metres (22,205 ft)
- Huantsán, 6,369 metres (20,896 ft)
- Huandoy, 6,360 metres (20,866 ft)
- Chopicalqui, 6,354 metres (20,846 ft)
- Chinchey, 6,309 metres (20,699 ft)
- Palcaraju, 6,274 metres (20,584 ft)
- Santa Cruz, 6,259 metres (20,535 ft)
- Copa, 6,188 metres (20,302 ft)
- Ranrapalca, 6,162 metres (20,217 ft)
- Pucaranra, 6,147 metres (20,167 ft)
- Hualcán, 6,122 metres (20,085 ft)
- Chacraraju, 6,108 metres (20,039 ft)
- Pucajirca, 6,046 metres (19,836 ft)
- Quitaraju, 6,040 metres (19,816 ft)
- Tocllaraju, 6,034 metres (19,797 ft)
- Artesonraju, 6,025 metres (19,767 ft)
- Caraz, 6,025 metres (19,767 ft)
- Contrahierbas, 5,954 metres (19,534 ft)
- Alpamayo, 5,947 metres (19,511 ft)
- Ocshapalca, 5,888 metres (19,318 ft)
- Pirámide, 5,885 metres (19,308 ft)
- Ulta, 5,875 metres (19,275 ft)
- San Juan, 5,843 metres (19,170 ft)
- Taulliraju, 5,830 metres (19,127 ft)
- Santa Cruz Norte, 5,829 metres (19,124 ft)
- Rinrijirca, 5,810 metres (19,062 ft)
- Santa Cruz Chico, 5,800 metres (19,029 ft)
- Tullparaju, 5,787 metres (18,986 ft)
- Pisco, 5,752 metres (18,871 ft)
- Paccharaju, 5,744 metres (18,845 ft)
- Champará, 5,735 metres (18,816 ft)
- Uruashraju, 5,722 metres (18,773 ft)
- Cayesh, 5,721 metres (18,770 ft)
- Cashan, 5,716 metres (18,753 ft)
- Shacsha, 5,703 metres (18,711 ft)
- Rúrec, 5,700 metres (18,701 ft)
- Mururaju, 5,688 metres (18,661 ft)
- Vallunaraju, 5,686 metres (18,655 ft)
- Caullaraju, 5,682 metres (18,642 ft)
- Queshque, 5,630 metres (18,471 ft)
- Jatuncunca, 5,600 metres (18,373 ft)
- Parón, 5,600 metres (18,373 ft)
- Perlilla, 5,587 metres (18,330 ft)
- Copap, 5,570 metres (18,274 ft)
- Jacabamba, 5,566 metres (18,261 ft)
- Andavite, 5,518 metres (18,104 ft)
- Millishraju, 5,510 metres (18,077 ft)
- Tantash, 5,504 metres (18,058 ft)
- Carhuascancha, 5,500 metres (18,045 ft)
- Churup, 5,493 metres (18,022 ft)
- Challhua, 5,487 metres (18,002 ft)
- Tuco, 5,479 metres (17,976 ft)
- Pucagaga Punta, 5,461 metres (17,917 ft)
- Yanapaccha, 5,460 metres (17,913 ft)
- Kima Rumi, 5,459 metres (17,910 ft)
- Huamashraju, 5,434 metres (17,828 ft)
- Urus, 5,423 metres (17,792 ft)
- Huapi, 5,421 metres (17,785 ft)
- Milluacocha, 5,404 metres (17,730 ft)
- Rocotopunta, 5,400 metres (17,717 ft)
- Raju Cutac, 5,355 metres (17,569 ft)
- Pucaraju, 5,346 metres (17,539 ft)
- Tarushcancha, 5,345 metres (17,536 ft)
- Tuctopunta, 5,343 metres (17,530 ft)
- Pomabamba, 5,336 metres (17,507 ft)
- Maparaju, 5,326 metres (17,474 ft)
- San Julián, 5,326 metres (17,474 ft)
- Vicos, 5,315 metres (17,438 ft)
- Carhuallún, 5,290 metres (17,356 ft)
- Chequiaraju, 5,286 metres (17,343 ft)
- Pilanco, 5,286 metres (17,343 ft)
- Rima Rima, 5,248 metres (17,218 ft)
- Tuctubamba, 5,240 metres (17,192 ft)
- Santón, 5,238 metres (17,185 ft)
- Yanamarey, 5,237 metres (17,182 ft)
- Tarush Huachanan, 5,205 metres (17,077 ft)
- Pacra, 5,118 metres (16,791 ft)
- Sentilo, 5,100 metres (16,732 ft)
- Ichic Jeulla, 5,091 metres (16,703 ft)
- Yanarrajo, 5,055 metres (16,585 ft)
- Pucaraju, 5,025 metres (16,486 ft)
- Arteza, 5,000 metres (16,404 ft)
- Tuctu, 5,000 metres (16,404 ft)
- Kunkush, 5,000 metres (16,404 ft)
- Cahuish, 4,900 metres (16,076 ft)
- Gaico, 4,900 metres (16,076 ft)
- Collpa Janca, 4,800 metres (15,748 ft)

=== Hot springs ===
Among the most important hot springs in the area are Monterrey and Chancos, which have been transformed into thermal bath facilities. They are 7 and 27 km respectively from the regional capital, Huaraz.

Musho

Climate chart (precipitation, max. and min. temperature)
J	F	M	A	M	J	J	A	S	O	N	D
86 20 7	86 20 8	105 20 7	59 21 7	19 21 6	3 22 4	2 22 3	9 23 3	21 23 5	54 22 6	51 22 6	62 21 7
- █ Average max. and min. temperatures in °C
- █ Precipitation totals in mm
- Source: Climate-Data.org
Imperial conversion
J	F	M	A	M	J	J	A	S	O	N	D
3.4 69 45	3.4 68 46	4.1 68 45	2.3 69 44	0.7 69 42	0.1 72 39	0.1 72 37	0.4 73 38	0.8 73 41	2.1 71 43	2 71 44	2.4 71 44
- █ Average max. and min. temperatures in °F
- █ Precipitation totals in inches

== Climate ==
The dry season extends from May through September, June and July having the least rain and more stable weather. The data on the chart correspond to the village of Musho (elevation: 3084 m), located at the foot of Huascarán.

== Ecology ==
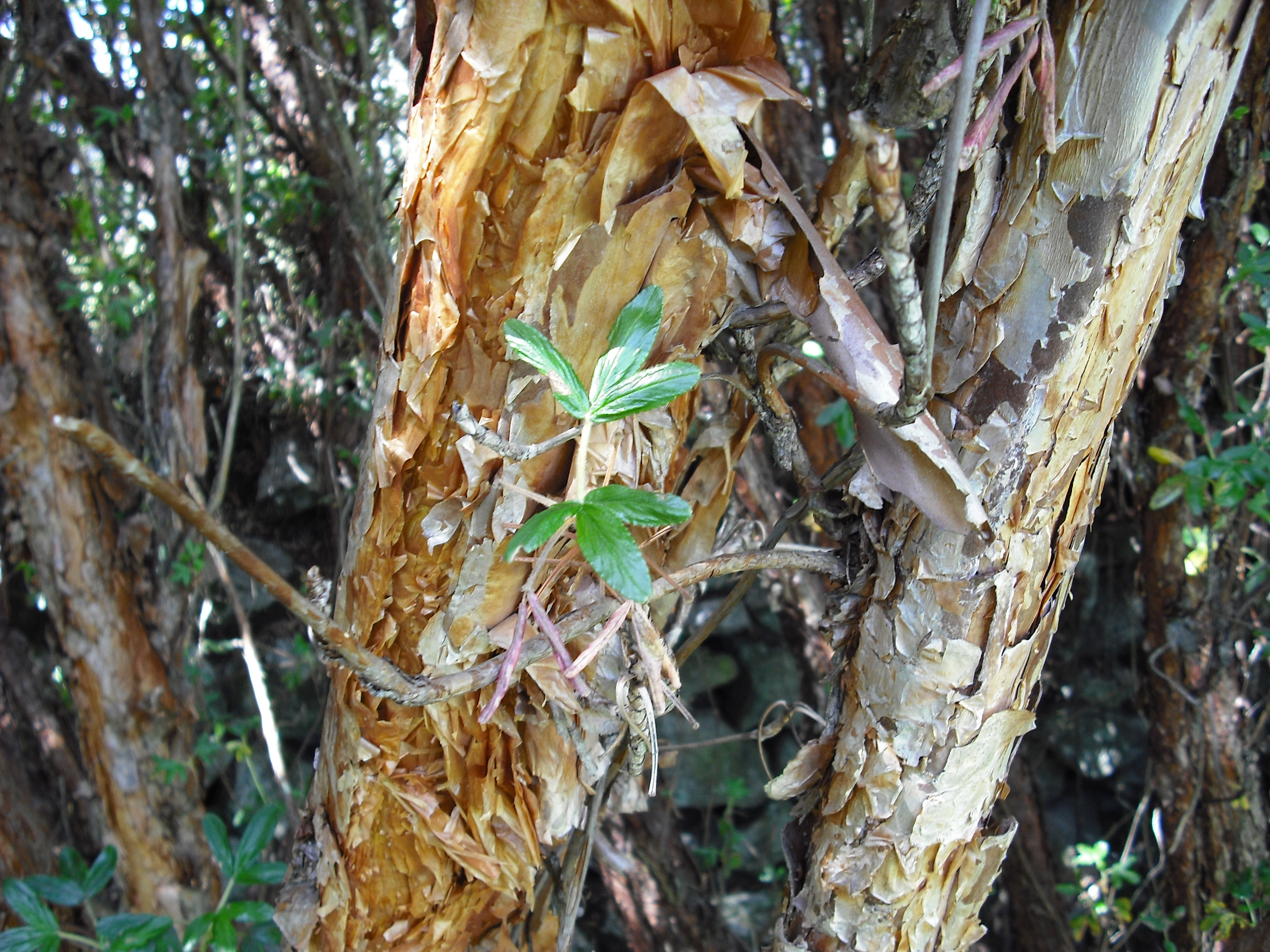
The papery bark of Polylepis racemosa, protects the tree from low temperatures.

Flora and fauna in the range have adapted to the climate and elevational range of mountainous areas. Almost all of the Cordillera Blanca is protected by Huascarán National Park.

=== Flora ===
The main types of plant communities present in the area are the vegetation of inter-Andean valleys (xerophytic plants in the lower elevations and shrubs and grassland at the higher elevations) and high-altitude vegetation (Puna grasslands and patches of high Andean forest).

Plants in the range have adapted to the intense solar radiation, low temperatures, and water availability. Most plant species have pubescent leaves, an adaptation that protects the plants from water loss due to the intense solar radiation and low nighttime temperatures of the mountain climate.

Examples of typical vegetation of this area include Polylepis racemosa, Escallonia resinosa, Alnus acuminata, Senna birostris, Vallea stipularis, Lupinus spp., Vaccinium floribundum, Puya raimondii, Calamagrostis vicunarum, Festuca dolichophylla, Jarava ichu, Azorella spp., and Ranunculus macropetalus.

=== Fauna ===
More than 120 bird species have been reported in Huascarán National Park. The most notable include the Andean condor, the torrent duck, the puna tinamou, the brown pintail, the Andean crested duck, the white-tufted grebe, the giant coot, and the Andean gull.

Among the mammals reported in the same area are the colocolo, the Andean mountain cat, the spectacled bear, the taruca deer, the vicuña, the white-tailed deer, the puma, the northern viscacha, the long-tailed weasel, the hog-nosed skunk, and the Andean fox.

== See also ==
- Cordillera Blanca Fault Zone
- List of mountains in Peru
- List of first ascents in the Cordillera Blanca
- Cordillera Negra
- Huascarán National Park
- Cordillera Central (disambiguation)
- Ancash Region
