= Huapi =

Huapi may refer to:

- Huapi, Hebei (化皮镇), town in Xinle, Hebei, China
- Huapi, Henan (华陂镇), town in Shangcai County, Henan, China
- Huapi Island, island in Ranco Lake, southern Chile
- Huapi (mountain), a mountain in the Peruvian Andes
- "The Painted Skin" (畫皮; huàpí), a short story by Pu Songling from Strange Tales from a Chinese Studio
  - Painted Skin (2008 film), a film adaptation
  - Painted Skin (TV series), a TV adaptation

== See also ==
- Painted Skin (disambiguation)
