= Paron =

Paron may refer to:

== Places ==
- Paron, Yonne, France, a commune
- Paron, Arkansas, United States, an unincorporated community
- Paron State, a non-salute state of the Gwalior Residency in pre-independence India
- Parón, Peru, a mountain in the Andes
- Lake Parón, Peru, in the Andes

== People ==
- Nereo Rocco (1912-1979), Italian football manager and player nicknamed El Paròn (Triestin for "The Master")
- Edmar Paron, bishop of the Roman Catholic Diocese of Paranaguá, Brazil, since 2015

== Other uses ==
- Paron District, a district in Ngawi Regency, Indonesia
- National Rally – Patriotic Radical Momentum of Victory, abbreviated PARON, a political party in Greece.
- Ngawi railway station, formerly "Paron Station", a railway station in Ngawi Regency, Indonesia
