= Carhuallún =

Mountain in Peru

- Location within Peru

Highest point
- Elevation: 5,290 m (17,360 ft)
- Coordinates: 8°53′49.12″S 77°44′16.42″W

Geography
- Location: Ancash, Peru
- Parent range: Cordillera Blanca

Carhuallún is a mountain located in the Cordillera Blanca mountain range, west of Santa Cruz, within Huascarán National Park in Peru. It has a height of 5,290 metres (17,356 ft).
