= Lake 69 =

Lake in Peru

- Laguna 69
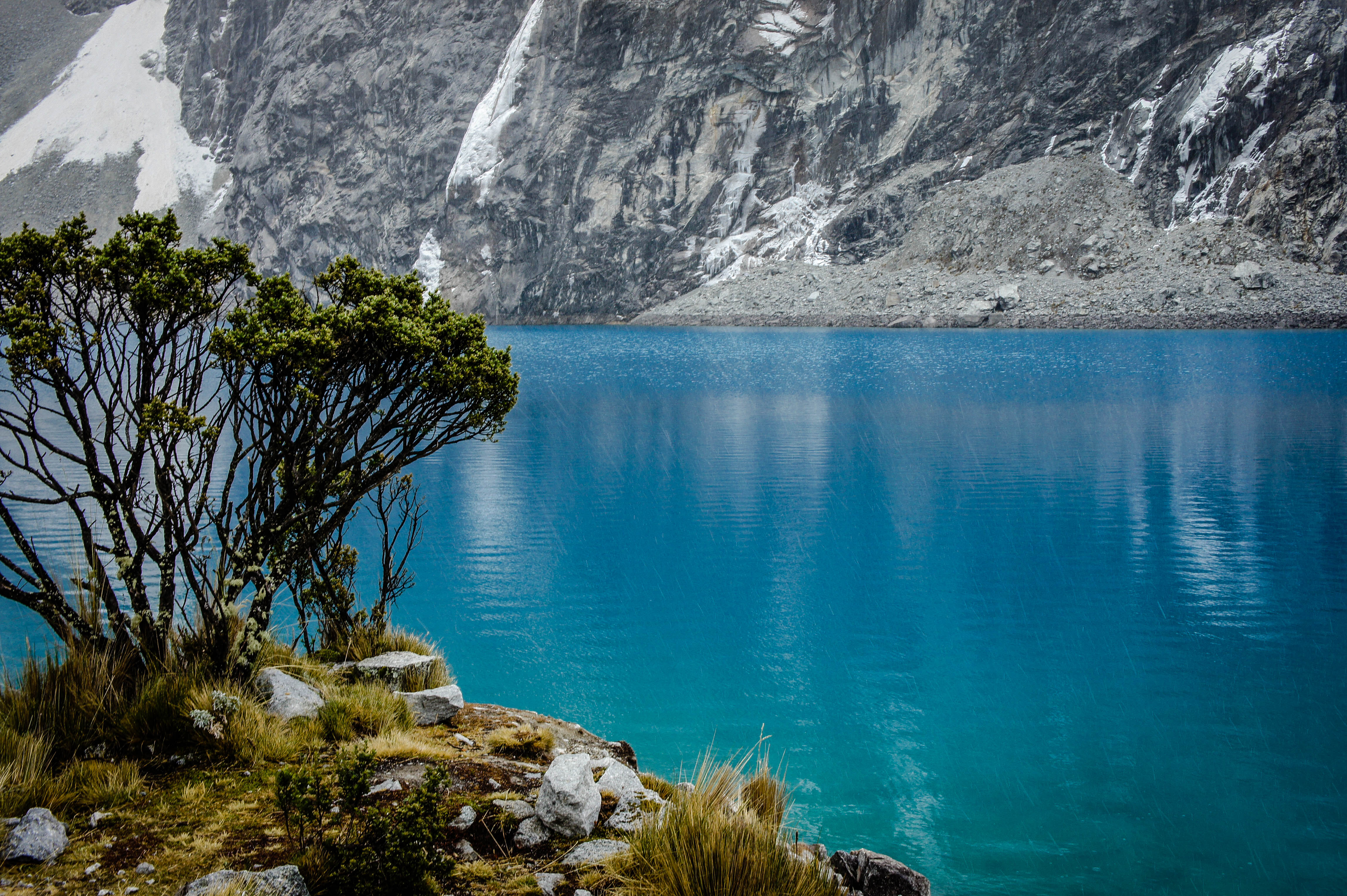

- Location within Peru
- Location: Huaraz / Áncash / Peru
- Coordinates: 9°0′37.55″S 77°36′43.2″W
- Primary inflows: glacial runoff
- Designation: Biosphere Reserve
- Surface elevation: 4,600 m (15,100 ft)

Lake 69 (Spanish: Laguna 69) is a small lake near of the city of Huaraz, in the region of Áncash, Peru. It is one of the more than 400 lakes that form part of the Huascarán National Park, a UNESCO Biosphere Reserve and World Heritage Site. In the thaw season, the lake is nourished by a waterfall from Chacraraju.

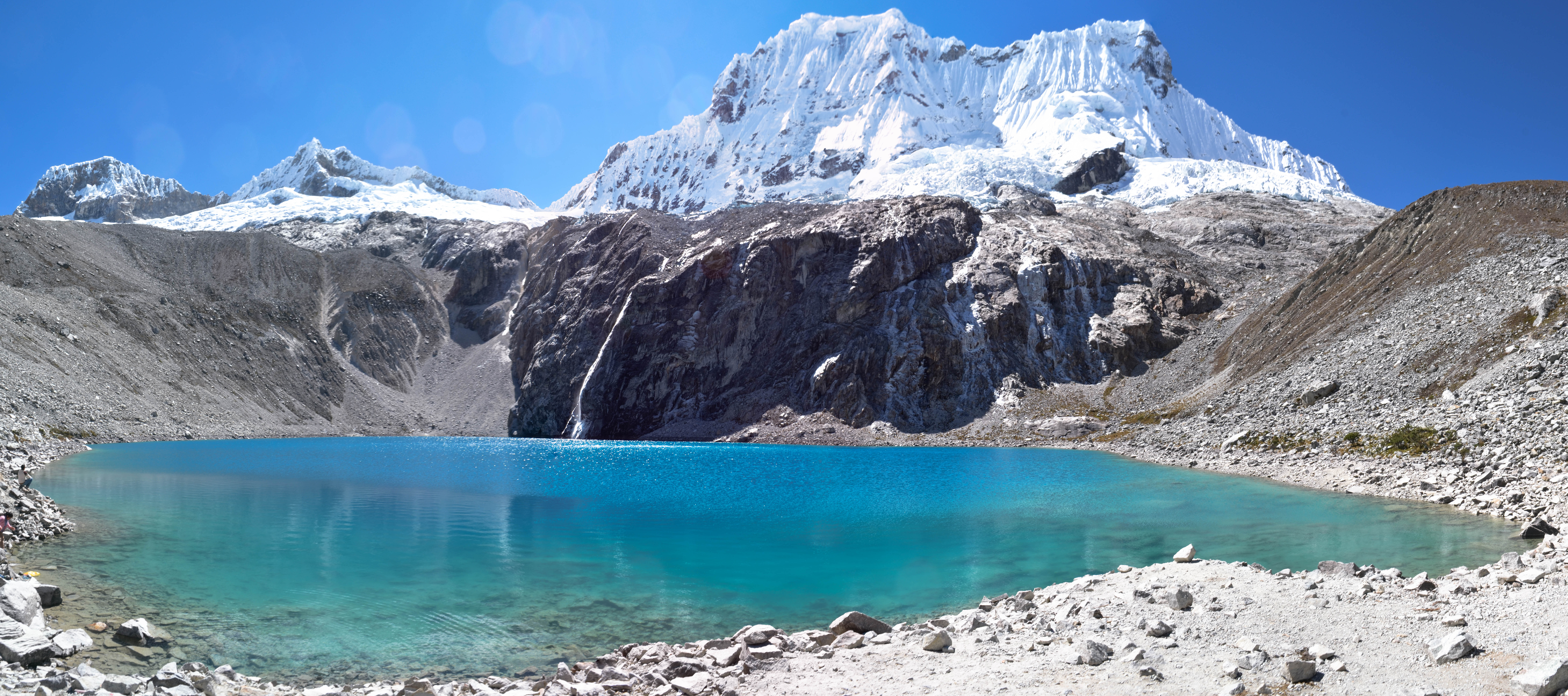
Laguna 69 in 2017

Its name comes from the fact that the lake did not have a name before the Huascaran National Park was created in 1975. The need to include all of the lakes of the proposed park into a list forced authorities to give a number-based names to those without a traditional name (lakes such as Allicocha, Auquiscocha or Palcacocha, had a names in Hispanicized Quechua).

It is one of the more important tourist destinations of the region, visited mainly by hiking and mountaineering enthusiasts, given the simple access and the spectacular scenery. The hiking route to the lagoon starts from the Cebolla Pampa campground and runs along the brook that runs down from the same lake, and forms several waterfalls and cataracts.
