= Erwin Schneider =

Austrian mountaineer and cartographer (1906–1987)

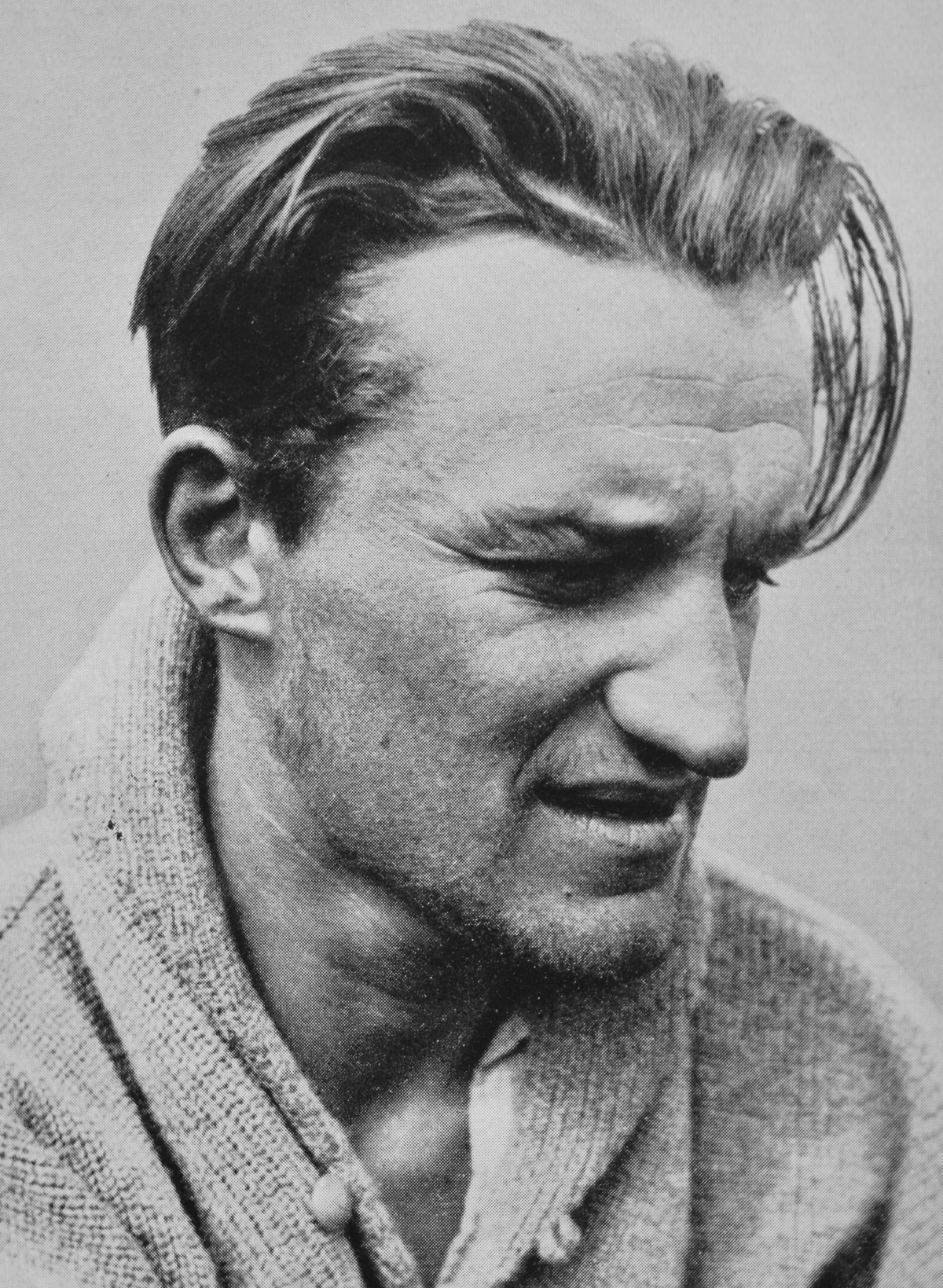
- Born: April 13, 1906; Jáchymov
- Died: August 18, 1987 (aged 80–81); Lech (Vorarlberg)

Erwin Schneider (13 April 1906 – 18 August 1987) was an Austrian mountaineer and cartographer. He made the first ascent of Huascarán, the highest mountain in Peru and of Lenin Peak in the Pamir Mountains. Between 1928 and 1931 he held and broke the records for the highest summit reached in the world on three different peaks in succession. He was also a pioneer in the use of terrestrial photogrammetry for mountain cartography.

== Early life ==
Schneider was born on 13 April 1906 in Jáchymov which was then part of the Austro-Hungarian Empire. He was schooled in Salzburg and later studied mining at the Technische Hochschule in Berlin, graduating in 1934 as a qualified engineer.

== Mountaineering ==
He was a member of the Soviet-German scientific expedition to the Pamir Mountains in 1928. On that expedition he made the first ascent of Lenin Peak 7,134 m (23,406 ft) with Karl Wien and Eugen Allwein on 25 July 1928. At that time the mountain had the name Kaufman Peak and, with Schneider's ascent, it became the highest summit reached in the world.

He joined Günter Dyhrenfurth's international expedition to Kangchenjunga in 1930 with Frank Smythe, Uli Wieland and other climbers from Germany, Austria and Switzerland. Because of poor weather and snow conditions they failed to climb Kangchenjunga but the party did make the first ascent of four 7000m peaks. Those included Nepal Peak 7,177 m (23,547 ft), which Schneider ascended by himself and Jongsong Peak 7,462 m (24,482 ft) which he climbed a few days later with Hermann Hoerlin.

In 1932 he made the first ascent of Huascarán Sur 6,768 m (22,205 ft), the highest mountain in Peru, on 20 July 1932. It has been written that the 1932 expedition, led by the geographer Hans Kinzl, "made Peru's ranges known to the mountaineering world" and it was "the year that inaugurated modern climbing in Peru". During the same expedition he was also part of the first ascent team on a number of peaks over 6000m including Chopicalqui on 3 August 1932 (via the southwest ridge), Artesonraju on 19 August 1932 (via the NE spur and N ridge) and Huandoy on 12 September 1932 (from the south).

He went to Pakistan in 1934 with the Austro-German expedition attempting to make the first ascent of Nanga Parbat. On that expedition he became one of a large group of climbers trapped by a storm at 7,480 m (24,540 ft). After spending two nights waiting for the storm to abate Schneider and Peter Aschenbrenner were deputed to lead the party down to lower levels. They took three Sherpas, the other three German mountaineers were to follow them with the rest of the Sherpas. When Schneider's group reached easier ground the party unroped and Schneider went ahead with Aschenbrenner, they expected the Sherpas to follow closely behind but they became separated and the Sherpas ended up spending two more difficult nights out in the storm before rejoining Schneider and Aschenbrenner at a lower level. The three other German mountaineers, including the expedition leader Willy Merkl, and eight Sherpas also struggled in their descent, the three Germans and six of the Sherpas died in the struggle. Schneider and Aschenbrenner were later accused of abandoning the other members of the party. Some commentators felt that "he was treated with great injustice", others felt that the accusations, which were led by Paul Bauer, were generated by the German National Socialist agenda.

He returned to Peru, with Kinzl and others, in 1936. They spent four months mountaineering and carrying out geographical and topographical work in the Cordillera Blanca and the Cordillera Huayhuash. During the course of that expedition Schneider and Arnold Awerzger made first ascents of Quitaraju via the west ridge on 17 Jul 1936 and the first ascent of Siula Grande on 28 July 1936. The Peruvian expeditions of 1932 and 1936 formed the basis of the book "Cordillera Blanca".

Schneider suffered severe frostbite during a winter ascent of the Biancograt on Piz Bernina. This was the end of his serious mountaineering, it led to the amputation of all of his toes and the middle section of his foot in 1939.

=== Records for the highest summit reached in the world ===
Before the ascent of Kamet in 1931 only six summits higher than 23,000 ft (7,000 m) had been ascended, Schneider had made the first ascent of three of those.

When he ascended Lenin Peak in 1928 he set the world altitude record for the highest summit reached. He broke that record himself in late May 1930 when he made a solo ascent of Nepal Peak, and then for a third time when he and Hoerlin made the first ascent of Jongsong Peak just a few days later on 2 June 1930.

== Cartographer ==
Schneider worked as assistant professor at the Institute of Geodesy at the Leibniz University Hannover and the Institute of Photogrammetry at the Technische Universität Berlin before embarking on a free-lance career as a surveyor and cartographer, the German and Austrian Alpine Club were a major client and he produced around ten maps of Alpine ranges in their Alpenverein series including those covering the Wetterstein and Ötztal Alps.

Further afield, his pioneering surveys around Huascarán and the Cordillera Huayhuash in Peru, which were initiated in the 1930s, were followed by photogrammetric surveys in various parts of Nepal, he also worked in Africa from the 1960s, most notably on the Lewis Glacier of Mt Kenya.

=== Cartography in Nepal ===
In 1955 he was invited to join the International Himalayan Expedition which Norman Dyhrenfurth led to Lhotse. Schneider was there as cartographer and he completed the first detailed topographic map of Mount Everest at the scale of 1:25,000.

From 1959 to 1974 he was Director of the Survey Team for the Association of Comparative Alpine Research in Nepal. In 1967 the Khumbu-Himal Map was produced, at a scale of 1:50,000 it covers a larger area than the 1955 Everest map, including both the south side of Mount Everest and a significant part of the Khumbu region. He was also resonsible for aerial and terrestrial surveys covering 11,000 square km of Eastern Nepal. The resulting detailed maps of this area, which is mainly high-mountain country, continue to be used for research and economic development.

== Death and legacy ==
Schneider died in Lech am Arlberg on 18 August 1987.

In 1971/1972 he had made an aerial survey of the Kathmandu Valley which he used to make detailed maps at the scale of 1:50,000 and 1:10,000 which were not published during his lifetime. In the 21st century the maps and the aerial photographs were published as a project to document Kathmandu’s transition from an intensively cultivated Himalayan valley into the modern urban landscape. Other aerial photographs he acquired are now being used by researchers studying the effects of climatic change in the Himalaya (and also in Peru).

After his death the Association of Comparative Alpine Research produced a volume to commemorate Schneider and his contribution to research on Nepal.
