= Millishraju =

Mountain in Peru

- Location within Peru

Highest point
- Elevation: 5,510 m (18,080 ft)
- Coordinates: 8°53′39″S 77°42′30″W

Geography
- Location: Ancash, Peru
- Parent range: Cordillera Blanca, Andes

Millishraju or Millisraju is a mountain in the Cordillera Blanca in the Andes of Peru. It has a height of 5,510 metres (18,077 ft).
