= Parón =

Mountain in Peru

- Location within Peru

Highest point
- Elevation: 5,600 m (18,400 ft)
- Coordinates: 8°57′23″S 77°36′49″W

Geography
- Location: Peru, Ancash Region
- Parent range: Andes, Cordillera Blanca

Parón, is a 5,600-metre-high (18,373 ft) mountain in the Cordillera Blanca in the Andes of Peru. Parón lies in Huascarán National Park, northeast of Pirámide.
