= Jongsong Peak =

Mountain in the Himalayas

- Location within Sikkim Location within Koshi Province Location within Tibet Location within Nepal Location within India

Highest point
- Elevation: 7,462 m (24,482 ft); Ranked 57th
- Prominence: 1,256 m (4,121 ft)
- Coordinates: 27°53′N 88°08′E

Geography
- Location: China–India–Nepal tripoint
- Parent range: Himalayas

Climbing
- First ascent: 2 June 1930 by Hermann Hoerlin and Erwin Schneider

Jongsong Peak is a mountain in the Janak section of the Himalayas. At 7,462 metres (24,482 ft) it is the 57th highest peak in the world, although it is dominated by the 3rd highest, Kangchenjunga, 20 km (12 mi) to the south. Jongsong's summit is on tripoint of India, Nepal and China.

== History ==
The first ascent was made on 2 June 1930 by Hermann Hoerlin and Erwin Schneider, members of an international expedition which included climbers from Germany, Austria, Switzerland and the UK and was led by Günter Dyhrenfurth. Until the first ascent of Kamet on 21 June 1931 by Frank Smythe (who was also a member of this 1930 expedition), Jongsong was the highest climbed peak in the world. Several members of the Jongsong Peak first ascent team were also members of the international mountaineering organisation The Himalayan Club.

On 30 September 2012, a team from the Kolkata section of the Himalayan Club (Pradeep Sahoo (Leader) with Ang Dorji Sherpa and Phurba Sherpa), ascended the Jongsong peak's east summit (named Domo by Dyhrenfurth) on a new route via the eastern ridge of the Jongsong peak from a col between the Jongsong massif and an adjoining peak called Dome Kang. The previous day, another team from the same expedition scaled Dome Kang (Rajib Mondal and Dawa Sherpa) from the common col along its east face (New route first ascent / second ascent overall). They had approached the mountains from the Jongsong glacier, Sikkim.
