= Ulta (mountain) =

Mountain in the Andes of Peru

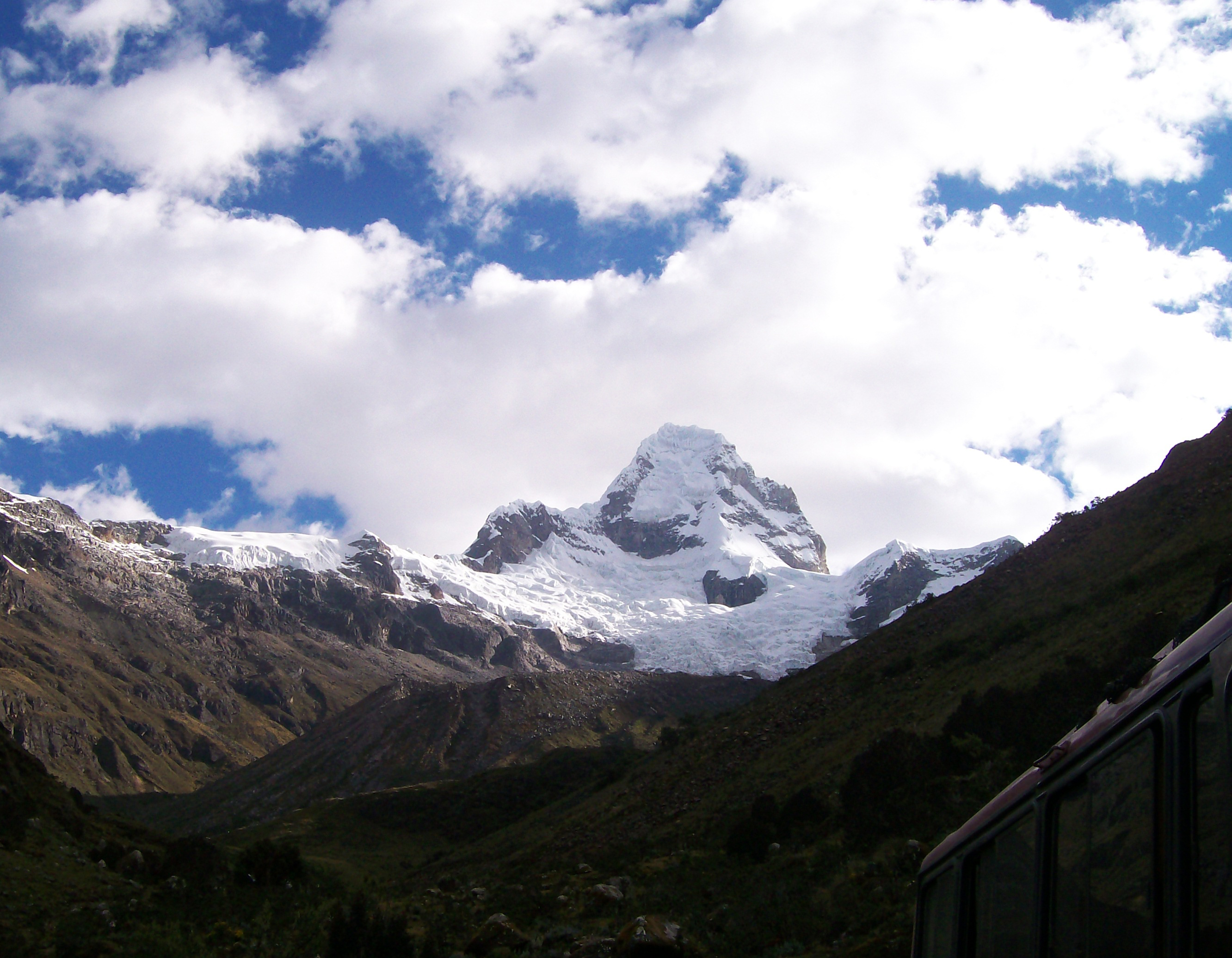
- Ulta

Highest point
- Elevation: 5,875 m (19,275 ft)
- Coordinates: 9°08′58.55″S 77°31′21.88″W

Geography
- Location within Peru
- Location: Ancash, Peru
- Parent range: Andes, Cordillera Blanca

Ulta is a mountain in the Cordillera Blanca in the Andes of Peru, about 5,875 metres (19,275 ft) high (although Peruvian IGN map cites an elevation of 5,782 metres (18,970 ft)). It is in the region of Ancash.
