= San Julián (mountain) =

Mountain in Peru

- Location within Peru

Highest point
- Elevation: 5,326 m (17,474 ft)
- Coordinates: 8°38′45″S 77°47′09″W

Geography
- Location: Ancash, Peru
- Parent range: Cordillera Blanca, Andes

San Julián is a mountain in the Cordillera Blanca in the Andes of Peru; within the district of Yuracmarca, Huaylas Province, Ancash. It has a height of 5,326 metres (17,474 ft).
