= Huapi (mountain) =

Mountain in Peru

- Jatunmontepuncu
- Location within Peru

Highest point
- Elevation: 5,421 m (17,785 ft)
- Coordinates: 9°24′32.2″S 77°22′15.2″W

Geography
- Location: Ancash, Peru
- Parent range: Cordillera Blanca

Huapi or Jatunmontepuncu is a mountain located in the Cordillera Blanca mountain range, southwest of Pucaranra, within Huascarán National Park. It has a height of 5,421 metres (17,785 ft).
