= Santa Cruz Chico =

- Location within Peru

Highest point
- Elevation: 5,800 m (19,000 ft)
- Coordinates: 8°53′39″S 77°42′30″W

Geography
- Location: Ancash, Peru
- Parent range: Cordillera Blanca, Andes

Santa Cruz Chico is a mountain in the Cordillera Blanca in the Andes of Peru; within Santa Cruz District, Huaylas Province, Ancash. It has a height of 5,800 metres (19,029 ft).
