= Santa Cruz Norte =

Mountain in Peru

- Location within Peru

Highest point
- Elevation: 5,829 m (19,124 ft)
- Coordinates: 08°52′14.80″S 77°43′5.44″W

Geography
- Location: Huaylas Province, Ancash, Peru
- Parent range: Cordillera Blanca, Andes

Santa Cruz Norte is a mountain in the Cordillera Blanca in the Andes of Peru; within Santa Cruz District, Huaylas Province, Ancash. It has a height of 5,829 metres (19,124 ft).
