= San Juan (mountain) =

Mountain in Peru

- Ancos Punta
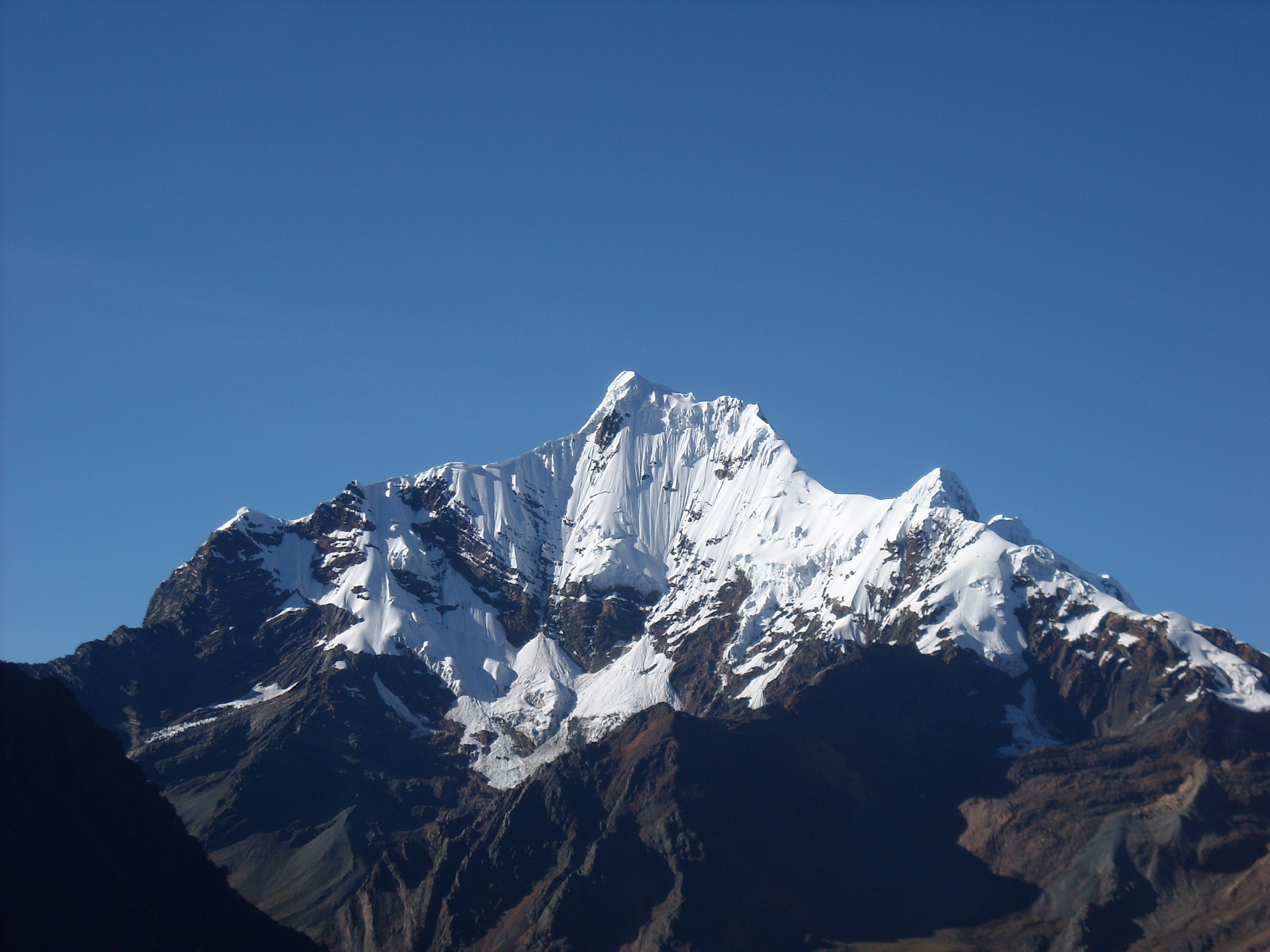
- Nevado San Juan.

Highest point
- Elevation: 5,843 m (19,170 ft)
- Coordinates: 9°28′17.8″S 77°19′37.1″W

Geography
- Location within Peru
- Location: Peru
- Parent range: Cordillera Blanca, (Andes)

San Juan or Ancos Punta is a mountain in the Andes of Peru. It is located in the region of Ancash and is part of the Cordillera Blanca mountain range, a sub-range of the Andes. It has an elevation of 5,843 metres (19,170 ft) above sea level. It is located northwest of mount Huantsán.
