= Chopicalqui =

Mountain in Peru

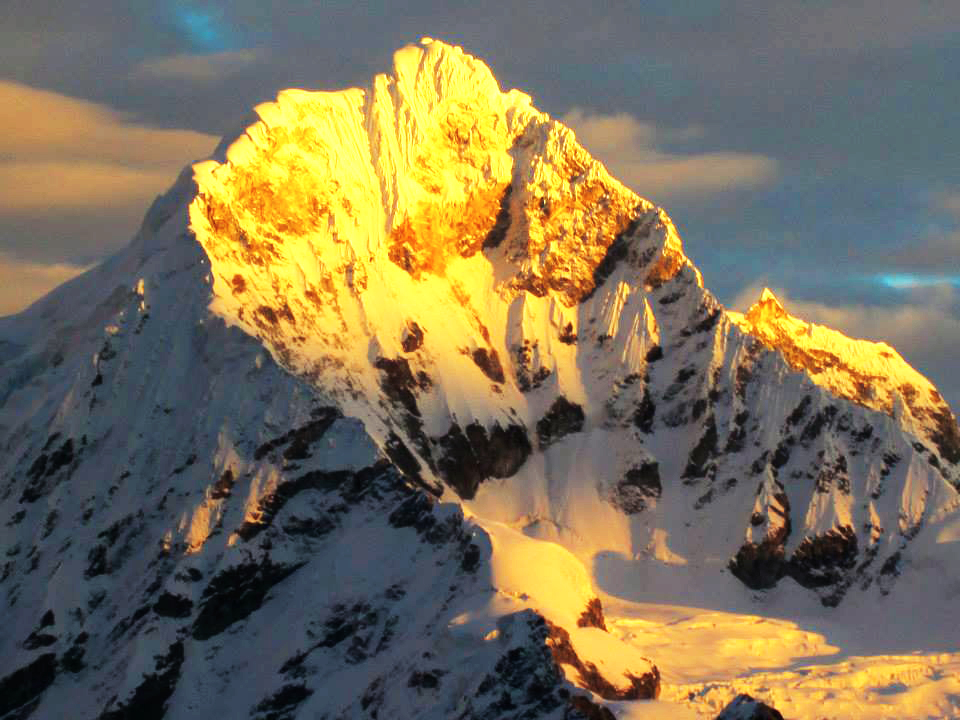

Highest point
- Elevation: 6,354 m (20,846 ft)
- Coordinates: 9°05′12″S 77°34′26″W

Naming
- Language of name: Quechua

Geography
- Location within Peru
- Location: Yungay Province, Peru
- Parent range: Cordillera Blanca (Andes)

Climbing
- First ascent: August 3, 1932 by Phillip Borchers, Erwin Hein, Hermann Hoerlin, and Erwin Schneider

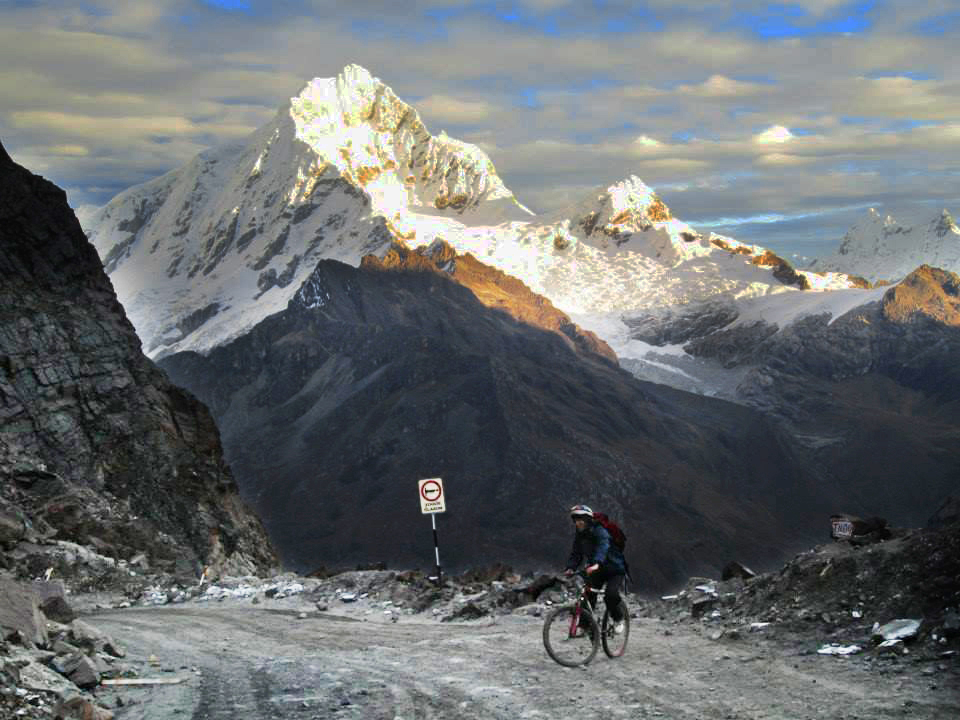
Chopicalqui

Chopicalqui or Chopicallqui (possibly from Huaylas Quechua Chawpi "center" kallki "ravine") is a mountain in the Cordillera Blanca area in the Andes of Peru. With a summit elevation of 6,354 metres (20,846 ft) above sea level it is one of the highest peaks of the Cordillera Blanca. It lies in Yungay Province, Ancash, between the mountains Huascarán and Contrahierbas.

== Climbing ==
The standard climbing route is the Southwest Ridge, a moderate snow climb that is popular with climbers and can be crowded at times. It possesses a difficulty rating of PD+/AD- on the French System for grading alpine routes but deep snow on the summit slopes causes most failures for parties attempting the ridge.

Other established climbing routes include the following:

1. Southeast Ridge (alpine grade TD-).
2. East Face Direct (alpine grade TD).
