= Huascarán =

Tallest mountain in Peru

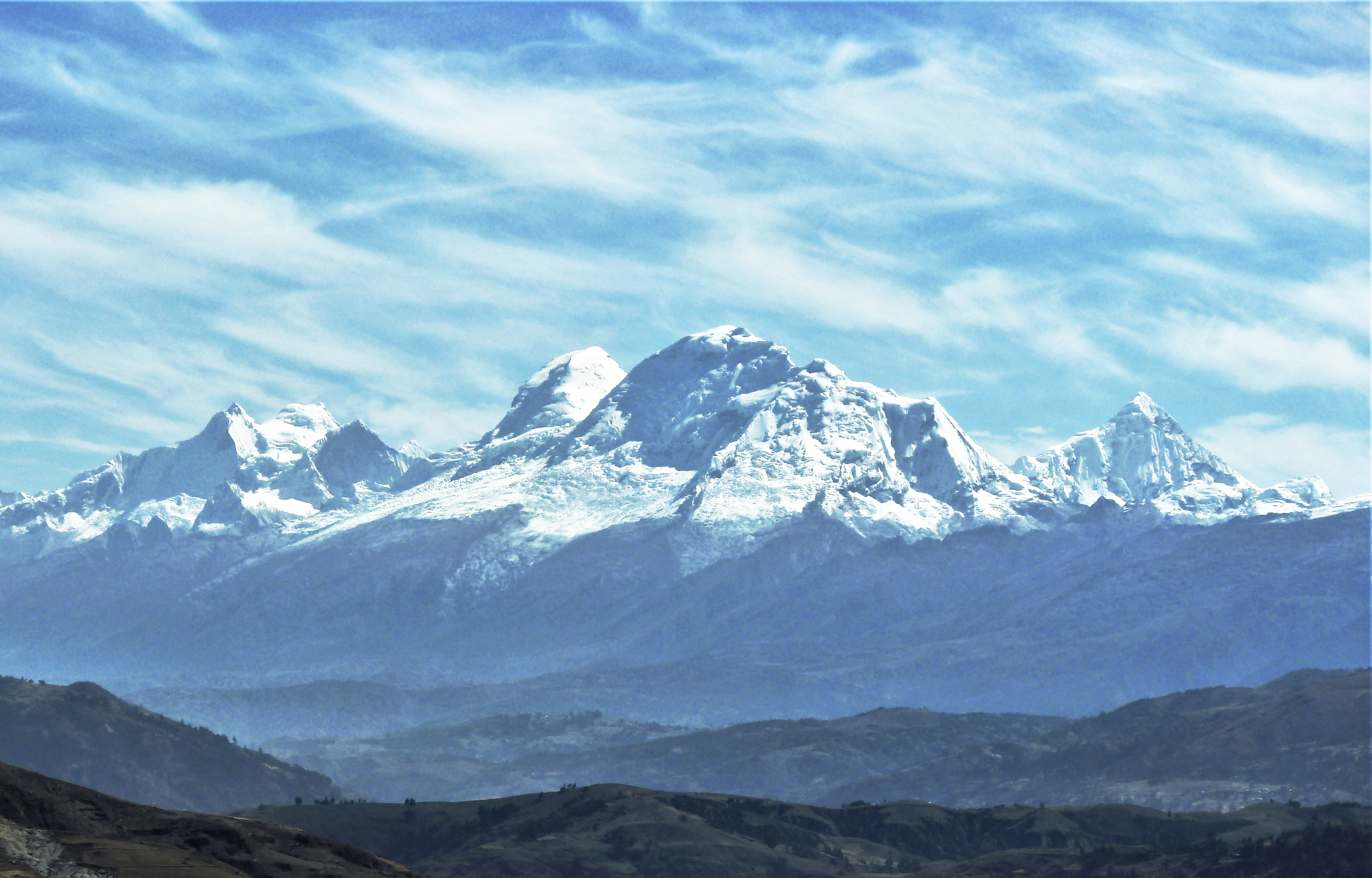
- Huascarán as viewed from Cordillera Negra

Highest point
- Elevation: 6,768 m (22,205 ft)
- Prominence: 2,776 m (9,108 ft)
- Isolation: 2,207.48 km (1,371.66 mi)
- Listing: Country high point Ultra
- Coordinates: 09°07′18″S 77°36′15″W

Geography
- Location within Peru
- Location: Yungay, Peru
- Parent range: Cordillera Blanca, Andes

Geology
- Rock age: Cenozoic
- Mountain type: Granite

Climbing
- First ascent: Huascarán Sur: 20 July 1932; Huascarán Norte: 2 September 1908
- Easiest route: glacier/snow/ice climb

Huascarán (Spanish pronunciation: [waskaˈɾan]; Quechua: Waskaran), Nevado Huascarán or Mataraju is a mountain located in Yungay Province, Ancash Department, Peru. It is situated in the Cordillera Blanca range of the western Andes. The southern summit of Huascarán (Huascarán Sur), which reaches 6,768 metres (22,205 ft), is the highest point in Peru, the northern Andes (north of Lake Titicaca), and in all of the Earth's tropics. It is the fourth highest mountain in South America after Aconcagua, Ojos del Salado, and Monte Pissis. Huascarán is ranked 25th by topographic isolation.

== Names ==
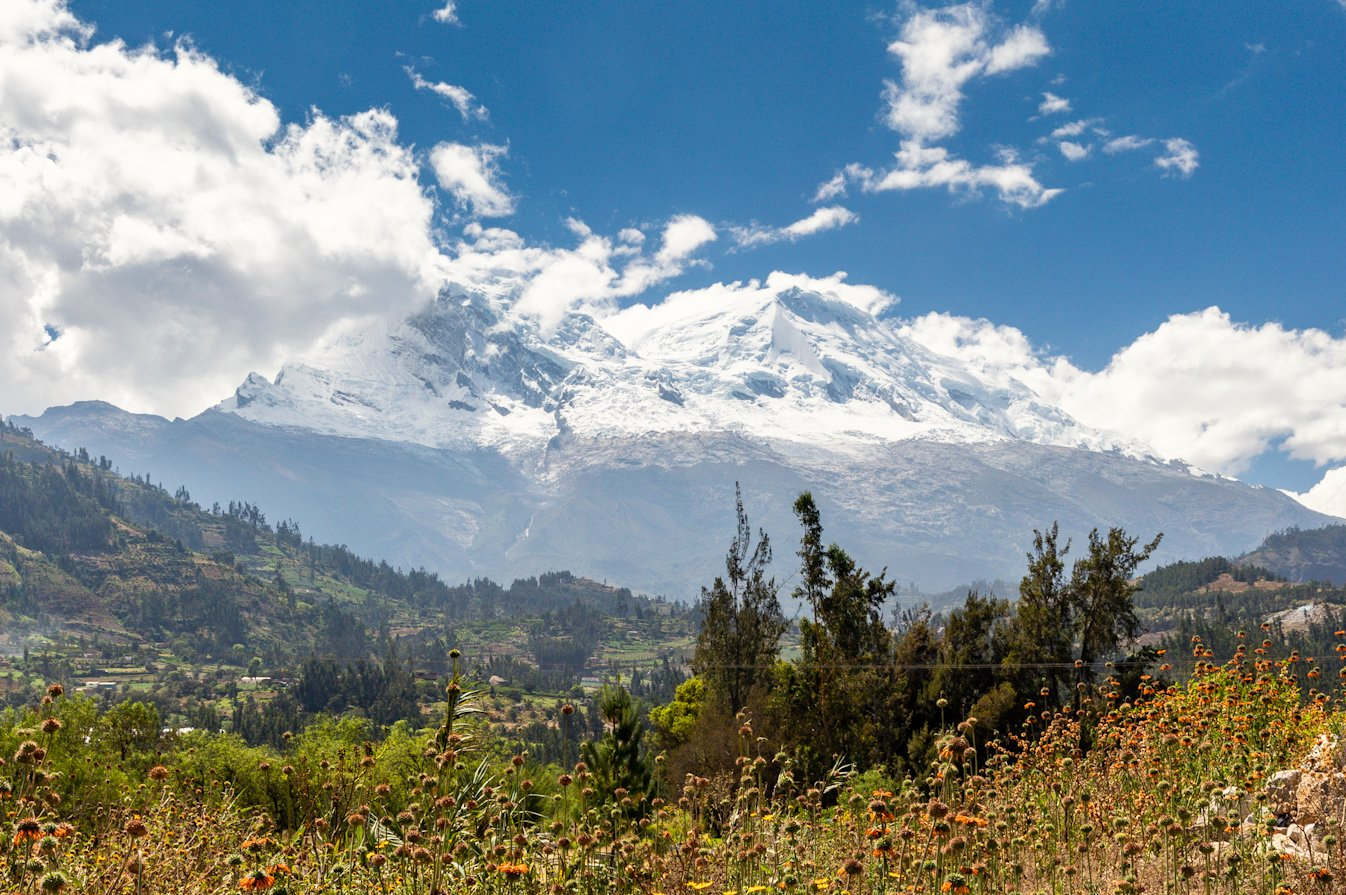
View of Huascarán from the town of Yungay

Until the 20th century, the mountain lacked a single commonly accepted name and was known by different names within the surrounding towns and villages. The first recorded mention of the name Huascarán appeared in 1850 as Huascan, given by the local people likely because the mountain rises above the village of Huashco. Huashco got its name from the Quechua word for rope (waska). At the beginning of the 20th century, the name appeared as Huascarán, and has not changed since. It seems that Huascarán is merely a contraction of Huashco-Urán, or 'beyond and down from the village of Huashco'.

Other names given to the mountain are Matarao and Mataraju, the latter being the name that local indigenous people prefer to call it, from Ancash Quechua mata ('twin') and rahu ('snow peak'), meaning 'twin snow peaks'.

== Myth ==
According to a legend, Huascarán was a nobleman who lived in a certain place in Áncash, while Huandoy was a woman who lived in a small town very close to where that mountain is. Huascarán was enormously in love with the woman, and they always saw each other secretly. One day Huascarán's father found out that he was in love with the lowborn woman, so he asked the Sun God for help. Seeing that he could not separate the two lovers, he decided to turn them into mountains, but the divinity decided to bring them together so that despite being mountains they continued with their love.

== Geography ==
The mountain has two distinct summits, the higher being the south one (Huascarán Sur) with an elevation of 6,768 metres (22,205 ft). The north summit (Huascarán Norte) has an elevation of 6,654 meters (21,831 ft). The two summits are separated by a saddle called la Garganta. The core of Huascarán, like much of the Cordillera Blanca, consists of Cenozoic-age granite.

Huascarán gives its name to Huascarán National Park which surrounds it, and is a popular location for trekking and mountaineering. The mountain's summit is one of the farthest points on the Earth's surface from its center, closely behind the farthest point at Chimborazo in Ecuador. It is also the place on Earth with the smallest gravitational force, with an estimated acceleration of 9.76392 m/s^{2}.

== Climbing ==
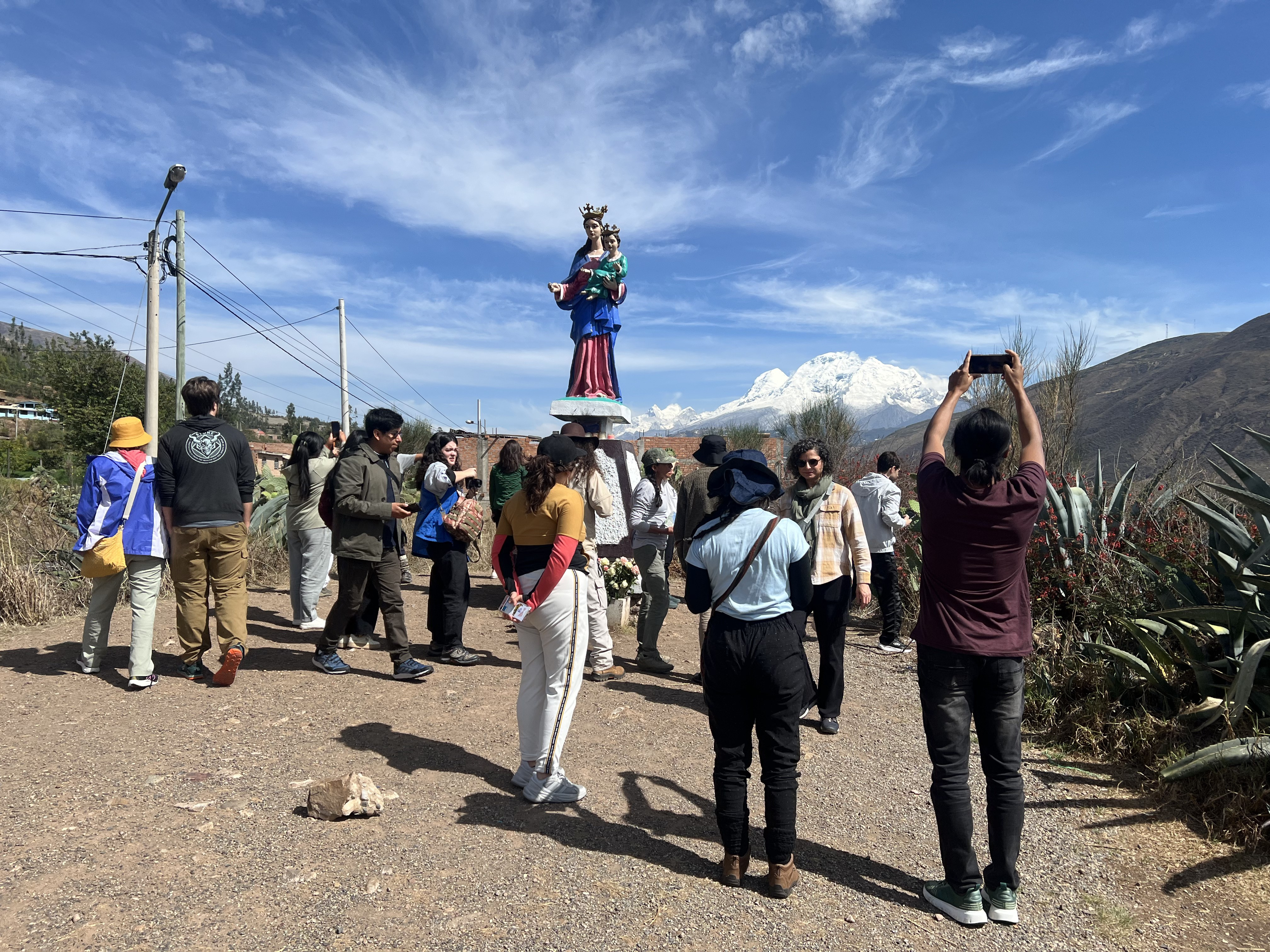
The mountain is easily seen from the surrounding area, with viewing spots (miradores) found alongside the road to the mountain

Huascarán is normally climbed from the village of Musho to the west via a high camp in the Garganta col. The ascent normally takes five to seven days, the main difficulty being the large crevasses that often block the route. The normal route is of moderate difficulty and rated between PD and AD (depending on the conditions of the mountain) according to the International French Adjectival System.

=== History ===
The summit of Huascarán Sur was first reached on 20 July 1932 by Erwin Schneider, Hermann Hoerlin, Franz Bernard, Phillip Borchers, Erwin Hein who were members of a joint German–Austrian expedition. The team followed what would later become the normal route (the Garganta route). The north peak (Huascarán Norte) had previously been climbed on 2 September 1908 by a U.S. expedition that included Annie Smith Peck, though this first ascent is somewhat disputed.

In 1989, a group of eight amateur mountaineers, the "Social Climbers", held what was recognized by the Guinness Book of Records (1990 edition) to be "the world's highest dinner party" on top of the mountain, as documented by Chris Darwin and John Amy in their book The Social Climbers, and raised £10,000 for charity.

On 20 July 2016, nine climbers were caught in an avalanche on Huascarán's normal route at approximately 5,800 m (19,000 ft), four of whom died.

On 9 July 2024, it was reported that the body of William Stampfl, an American mountaineer, had been found 22 years after he disappeared in an avalanche in June 2002. The body of one of Stampfl's climbing companions had previously been recovered. A third member of the group is still unaccounted for.

=== Huascarán Norte ===
Apart from the normal route, climbed in 1908 and rated PD+/AD-, all the other routes are committing and serious.

1. Northwest ridge (Italian route), rated ED1/ED2 climbed on 25 July 1974 by E. Detomasi, C. Piazzo, D. Saettone and T. Vidone.
2. Northwest face (Polish–Czech variant), rated ED1/ED2, climbed on 14 July 1985 by B. Danihelkova, Z. Hofmannová, A. Kaploniak, E. Parnejko and E. Szczesniak.
3. North face (Paragot route), rated ED1, climbed on 10 July 1966 by R. Paragot, R. Jacob, C. Jacoux and D. Leprince-Ringuet.
4. North face (Swiss route), rated ED2+, climbed on 23 May 1986 by D. Anker and K. Saurer. This route requires at least four days on the face.
5. North face (Spanish route), rated ED2+, climbed on 20 July 1983 by J. Moreno, C. Valles and J. Tomas.

=== Huascarán Sur ===
As for the South summit, apart from the normal route all the others are difficult.

1. West ridge (Shield route), rated D+, climbed on 15 June 1969 by W. Broda, S. Merler and B. Segger. Approach as for the Garganta route but then the route develops over the knife-edge West ridge before getting to the summit icefield.
2. West ridge direct (Lomo fino route), rated TD-, was climbed on 7 July 2007 by M. Ybarra and S. Sparano. Approach as for the Garganta route but afterwards the route develops straight over the West face.
3. Northeast ridge (Spanish route), rated TD+, was climbed on 18 July 1961 by F. Mautino, P. Acuna, A. Perez and S. Rivas. The route starts from Chopicalqui col, crosses the upper part of the Matara glacier and reaches the northeast ridge developing across cornices and snow mushrooms.

== 1970 earthquake ==
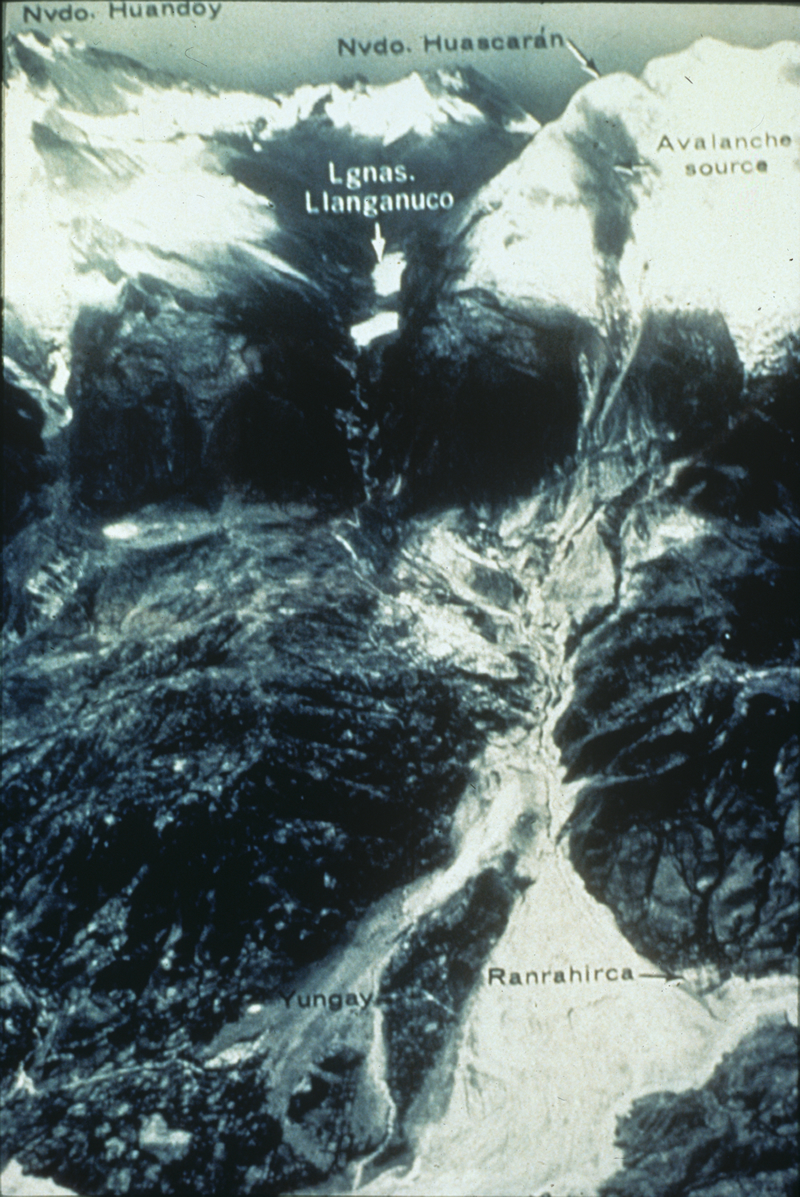
Photograph taken after the 1970 avalanche showing the buried towns of Yungay and Ranrahirca

On 31 May 1970, the Ancash earthquake caused a substantial part of the north side of the mountain to collapse in an avalanche with an estimated 80 million cubic metres (2.8 billion cubic feet) of ice, mud and rock, measuring about 0.8 by 1.6 kilometres (0.5 mi × 1 mi). It advanced about 18 km (11 mi) at an average speed of 280 to 335 km/h (175 to 210 mph), burying the towns of Yungay and Ranrahirca under ice and rock, killing more than 20,000 people. At least 20,000 people were also killed in Huaraz, the site of a 1941 avalanche (see Lake Palcacocha). Estimates suggest that the earthquake killed over 66,000 people. The final toll was 67,000 dead and 800,000 homeless, making it the worst earthquake-induced disaster in the Western Hemisphere until the 2010 Haiti earthquake.

Also buried by an avalanche was a Czechoslovak mountaineering team, none of whose 15 members were ever seen again. This and other earthquake-induced avalanche events are often described as "eruptions" of Huascarán, despite not being of volcanic origin.

An earlier avalanche on 10 January 1962, caused by a rapid rise in temperature, killed an estimated 4,000 people.

== Ice Coring ==
In the early 1990s, scientific campaigns were launched to drill ice cores at Huascarán. During a scouting mission in 1991, a network of stakes was established to monitor snow accumulation rates on the mountain col. In 1993, researchers from the Byrd Polar and Climate Research Center returned to drill two ice cores down to bedrock—approximately 160 meters below the surface. The climate records preserved in the deepest ice layers are at least 19,000 years old.

Following a new scouting mission to Huascarán in 2016, researchers returned to Huascarán in 2019 to drill two new ice cores to bedrock on the Huascarán col, extending the record of the original ice cores by 26 years. In addition to the new col ice cores, the researchers also drilled two ice cores to bedrock on Huascarán Sur. Because the south summit of Huascarán is the highest peak in Earth’s tropics, the ice cores from Huascarán Sur are the highest-elevation tropical ice cores ever collected.

== See also ==
- Cordillera Blanca

== Bibliography ==
- Biggar, John (2020). The Andes – A Guide for Climbers and Skiers (5th ed.). Castle Douglas. ISBN 978-0-9536087-6-8.
- Gates, Alexander E.; Ritchie, David (2006). Encyclopedia of Earthquakes and Volcanoes. Infobase Publishing. ISBN 9780816072705.
- Room, Adrian (1997). Placenames of the World. McFarland and Company. ISBN 0-7864-0172-9.
