= Monterrey, Ancash =

Monterrey
- Town
- Location within Peru
- Coordinates: 9°28′8″S 77°32′8.69″W
- Country: Peru
- Region: Ancash
- Province: Huaraz
- District: Huaraz
- Elevation: 2,981 m (9,780 ft)

Monterrey is a small town in Huaraz District, Huaraz Province, region of Ancash, Peru. It is located some 7 km (4.3 mi) to the north of the town centre of Huaraz. Monterrey is located in the Santa river valley, also known as Callejon de Huaylas at 2981 m.a.s.l.

== Hot springs ==
The town is known for its hot springs, which have temperatures of 49 °C (120 °F) and have medicinal properties. Water at the hot springs, which are privately run by a local hotel, is brownish due to the presence of iron.

Monterrey

Climate chart (precipitation, max. and min. temperature)
J	F	M	A	M	J	J	A	S	O	N	D
103 21 8	99 21 8	125 21 8	71 22 8	22 22 6	3 23 5	2 23 4	9 24 4	24 24 6	62 23 7	55 22 7	73 22 7
- █ Average max. and min. temperatures in °C
- █ Precipitation totals in mm
- Source: Climate-Data.org
Imperial conversion
J	F	M	A	M	J	J	A	S	O	N	D
4.1 70 46	3.9 69 47	4.9 70 46	2.8 71 46	0.9 71 44	0.1 74 40	0.1 74 38	0.4 75 39	0.9 75 42	2.4 73 44	2.2 72 45	2.9 72 45
- █ Average max. and min. temperatures in °F
- █ Precipitation totals in inches

== Climate ==
The climate at Monterrey is temperate, with warm days and cold nights, being 14.3 °C (57.7 °F) the average temperature.
