= Palcaraju =

Mountain in Peru

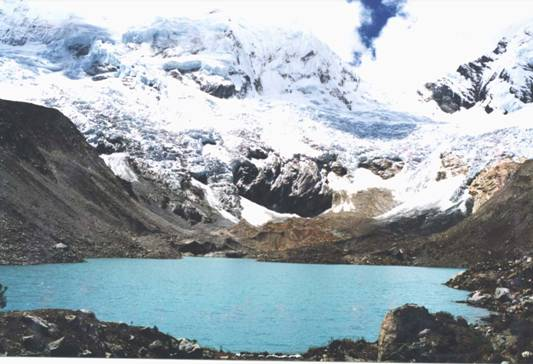
- Lake Palcacocha with lower slopes of Palcaraju (left) and Pucaranra (right).

Highest point
- Elevation: 6,274 m (20,584 ft)
- Prominence: 714 m (2,343 ft)
- Coordinates: 09°22′06″S 77°22′15″W

Geography
- Location within Peru
- Location: Ancash, Peru
- Parent range: Andes, Cordillera Blanca

Climbing
- First ascent: 1939

Palcaraju (from Quechua pallqa, p'allqa, p'alqa forked, branched, fork, rahu snow, ice, mountain with snow,) is a mountain in the Cordillera Blanca mountain range in the region of Ancash within the Peruvian Andes. It has an elevation of 6,274 metres (20,584 ft) on its main summit.

Palcaraju has three peaks: Palcaraju (6,274 metres (20,584 ft)), Palcaraju Oeste 6,110 metres (20,046 ft) and Palcaraju Sur 6,274 metres (20,584 ft).

In July 2012, two American climbers, Ben Horne and Gil Weiss, died on the way back down, after scaling the south face of Palcaraju W.
