= Huandoy =

Mountain in Peru

- Tullparaju
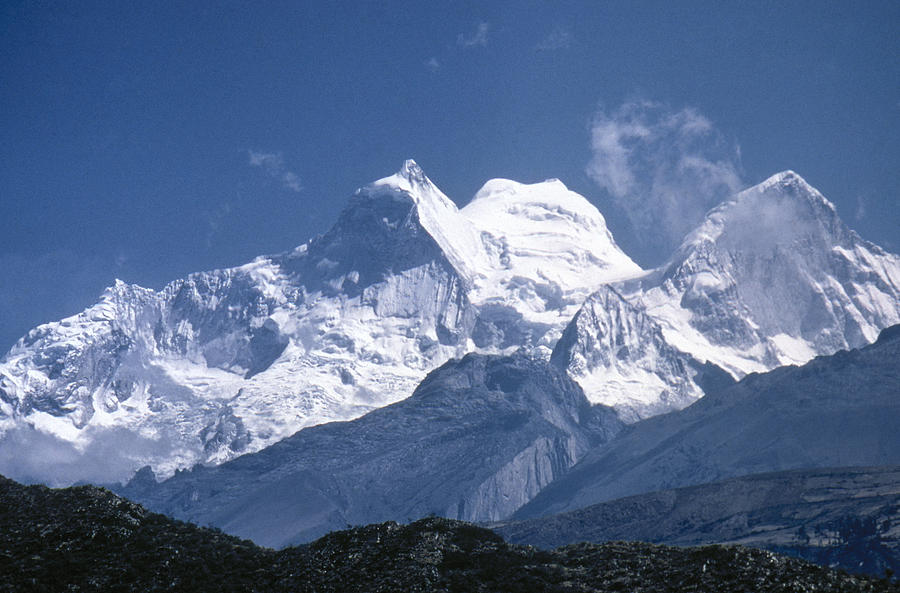
- Huandoy

Highest point
- Elevation: 6,395 m (20,981 ft)
- Prominence: 1,645 m (5,397 ft)
- Listing: Ultra
- Coordinates: 09°01′43″S 77°39′56″W

Geography
- Location within Peru
- Location: Yungay Province, Ancash, Peru
- Parent range: Cordillera Blanca, Andes

Climbing
- First ascent: 1932 by E. Hein and Erwin Schneider
- Easiest route: Southwest face

Huandoy (probably from Quechua wantuy, to transfer, to transpose, to carry, to carry a heavy load) or Tullparaju (possibly from Quechua tullpa rustic cooking-fire, stove, rahu snow, ice, mountain with snow) is a mountain located inside Huascarán National Park in Ancash, Peru. It is the second-tallest peak of the Cordillera Blanca section of the Andes, after Huascarán. These two peaks are rather nearby, separated only by the Llanganuco glacial valley (which contains the Llanganuco Lakes) at 3,846 m asl.

It is a snow-capped mountain with four peaks arranged in the form of a fireplace, the tallest of which is 6,395 m. The four peaks are each over 6,000 m, and are:

- Huandoy (6,395 m)
- Huandoy-West (6,356 m)
- Huandoy-South (6,160 m)
- Huandoy-East (6,000 m)

The first recorded ascent was made on 12 Sep 1932 by Erwin Schneider and Erwin Hein who were members of a joint German–Austrian expedition.

== Myth ==
Huascarán was a noble man who lived in a certain place in Áncash, while Huandoy was a woman who lived in a small town very close to where this mountain is now. Huascarán was enormously in love with the girl, so they always saw each other secretly. One day Huascarán's father found out that he was in love with the little woman, so he asked the Sun God for help. Seeing that he could not separate the two lovers, he decided to turn them into mountains, but the divinity decided to bring them together so that despite their being mountains continued with their love.

== See also ==
- List of Ultras of South America
