= Lake Palcacocha =

Lake in Peru

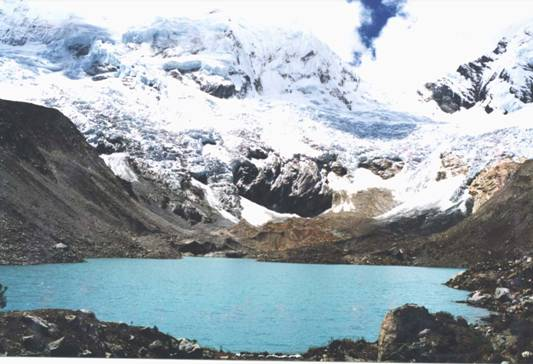
- 2002

- Location within Peru
- Location: Ancash Region
- Coordinates: 9°23′49″S 77°22′47″W
- Basin countries: Peru
- Surface elevation: 4,566 m (14,980 ft)

Palcacocha (possibly from Quechua pallqa, p'allqa, p'alqa forked, branched, fork, qucha lake) is a glacier lake in the Andes mountain range of South America in northwestern Peru located in the Ancash Region, Huaraz Province.

== Location ==
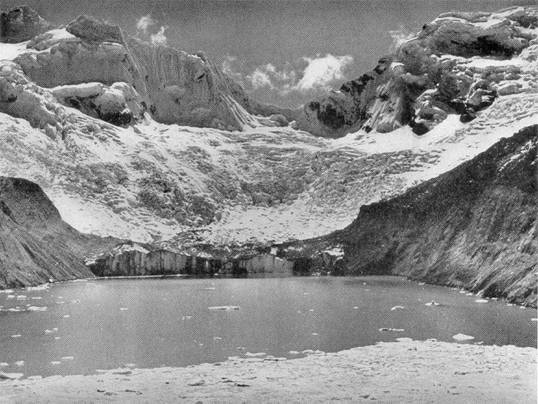
Lake Palcacocha in 1939

Palcacocha is located at 9°23′49″S 77°22′47″W in the Ancash Region in Cordillera Blanca at an elevation of 4,566 m, just below the summits of Palcaraju (6,274 m) and Pucaranra (6,156 m). The lake is one of several lakes supplying the town Huaraz with water, 23 km to the southwest.

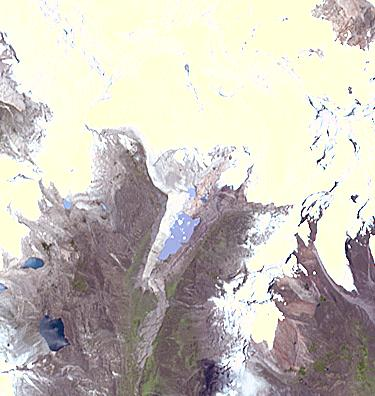
Palcacocha in 2001

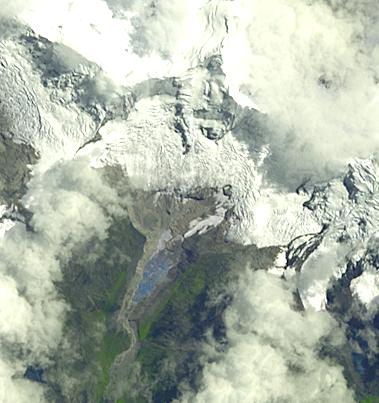
Palcacocha in 2003

== 1941 mudflow ==
On the early morning of 13 December 1941 a huge chunk of the adjacent glacier or a large avalanche fell into Lake Palcacocha causing the breaking of the moraine walls that limit the lake downhill. The wave hurtled down the Cojup valley, destroying Lake Jiracocha on its way and carrying blocks of ice, large rock boulders and liquid mud towards the Santa River valley. Within 15 minutes the mudslide reached Huaraz, with 400 m^{3} of debris burying parts of the town and killing approximately 1,800 to 7,000 inhabitants.

The outburst is estimated to have reduced the volume of the lake from about 10 million cubic metres to half a million. In 1974 drainage structures were built to maintain the level eight metres below the height of the damming moraine in order to protect against overtopping in the event of an avalanche or ice fall into the lake. But an adjacent glacier to the lake has receded since the incident increasing the size of the lake. Also because of climate-change-related melting of the glacier the lake's water input has also increased dramatically since the disaster. By 2009 its volume was about 17 million cubic metres.

== Recent developments ==
In April 2003, NASA scientists discovered a fissure in the glacier above Lake Palcacocha on Terra satellite images of November 2001. Their warnings reached Peru just two weeks after the staff of the UGRH (Unidad de Glaciologia y Recursos Hidricos) had done some field mapping of Lake Palcacocha, where a moraine rupture had caused a minor flood on 19 March 2003 which the safety constructions from the 1940s had captured.

According to research done by scientists of the Innsbruck university in Austria, the ensuing panic among the inhabitants and economic damage to Huaraz' tourism industry could have been prevented, as from their findings the NASA warnings were a misinterpretation of satellite data.

The water volume of Lake Palcacocha has increased significantly in recent years. According to a study by the University of Texas at Austin, the city of Huaraz faces a high risk of flooding from the lake. The volume has grown 34 times since 1970, leading to the declaration of several states of emergency. At the same time, the population of Huaraz has increased from 25 000 in 1941 to around 100 000, many of whom live in the area that was previously flooded.

In 2010 the UGRH presented plans to lower the water level by 15 meters to decrease the risk of flooding. At the same time, the national government rescinded responsibility for glacier lakes from the UGRH and transferred it to the regional authorities. Since the regional authorities did not come up with the funds to implement the measures proposed by the UGRH, six drainpipes were installed in 2011 which reduced the water level by three meters by July 2013.

== Worldwide responsibility ==
In March 2015, a citizen of Huaraz who is affected by the risk of flooding, Saúl Luciano Lliuya, shifted global interest to the situation at Lake Palcacocha when he sent a letter to the German utility company RWE in which he held them partially accountable for the situation. Luciano Lliuya states that RWE has contributed half a percentage to global climate change through its operations; accordingly, RWE should contribute half a percentage of the costs to reduce the risk of flooding. On April 30, 2015, the company responded by saying that Saúl Luciano Lliuya's claim had no legal basis and denied any responsibility for the situation. The case was dismissed at the District Court Essen, at which point the plaintiff appealed the decision to the Higher Regional Court of Hamm. In 2018, the case entered into an evidentiary stage at the Higher Regional Court of Hamm. The decision establishes a historic legal precedence, finding that private entities which have contributed to anthropogenic climate change can be held responsible, in part, for damages linked to climate change. During this stage, court-appointed experts were tasked with evaluating the flood risk of Lake Palcacocha and preparing a report regarding the impact that anthropogenic warming has had on the increase in lake levels.
