= Painted Skin =

Painted Skin may refer to:

- "Painted Skin" (short story), short story from Pu Songling's Strange Stories from a Chinese Studio
- Painted Skin (1992 film), Hong Kong film directed by King Hu
- Painted Skin (2008 film), Chinese film directed by Gordon Chan
  - Painted Skin: The Resurrection, 2012 Chinese film, sequel to the 2008 film
- Painted Skin (TV series), 2011 Chinese television series
- Painted Skin 2 (TV series), 2013 Chinese television series

== See also ==
- Body painting
