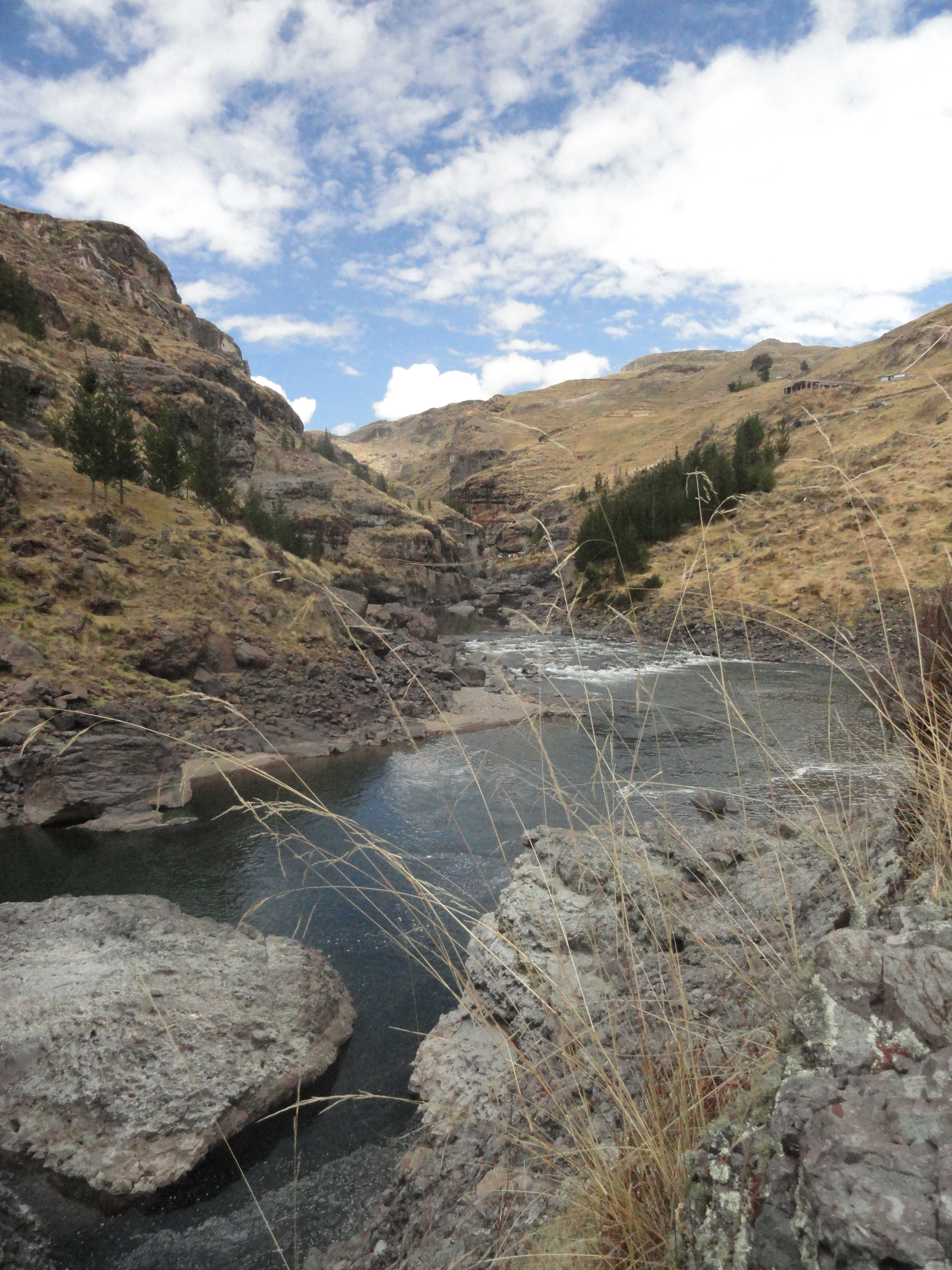

Scientific classification
- Kingdom: Plantae
- Clade: Tracheophytes
- Clade: Angiosperms
- Clade: Monocots
- Clade: Commelinids
- Order: Poales
- Family: Poaceae
- Subfamily: Pooideae
- Genus: Festuca
- Species: F. dolichophylla

Binomial name
- Festuca dolichophylla J.Persl

= Festuca dolichophylla =

Species of grass

Festuca dolichophylla is a species of grass which is endemic to western South America with an occurrence in Costa Rica.

== Description ==
The plant is perennial and caespitose with erect culms that are 65–110 centimetres (26–43 in) long and 2–4 millimetres (0.079–0.157 in) wide. The ligule is 1–2.5 millimetres (0.039–0.098 in) long and is going around the eciliate membrane.

Leaf-blades are filiform, erect and are 25–50 centimetres (9.8–19.7 in) long and 2–5 millimetres (0.079–0.197 in) broad. They also have scaberulous, hairy, and smooth surface which is ribbed a swell.

The panicle is elliptic, open, inflorescenced and is 10–25 centimetres (3.9–9.8 in) long and 3–4 millimetres (0.12–0.16 in) broad with 8–15 centimetres (3.1–5.9 in) long peduncle.

Spikelets are solitary with pedicelled fertile spikelets that carry 5–7 fertile florets. The main panicle branches are going far up and are 6–12 centimetres (2.4–4.7 in) long. It also have a barren and scaberulous rhachilla that is 10–17 millimetres (0.39–0.67 in) long. The glumes are chartaceous and keelless, have acute apexes, with only difference is in size. The upper one is 6–7.2 millimetres (0.24–0.28 in) long while the other one is 4–6 millimetres (0.16–0.24 in).

Fertile lemma is 6.5–8 millimetres (0.26–0.31 in) long and is also chartaceous, lanceolate, keelless, and purple in colour. Lemma itself is muticous with acuminate apex, scaberulous surface and carries one awn.

Flowers have three stamens while the fruits are caryopses with an additional pericarp and linear hilum.
