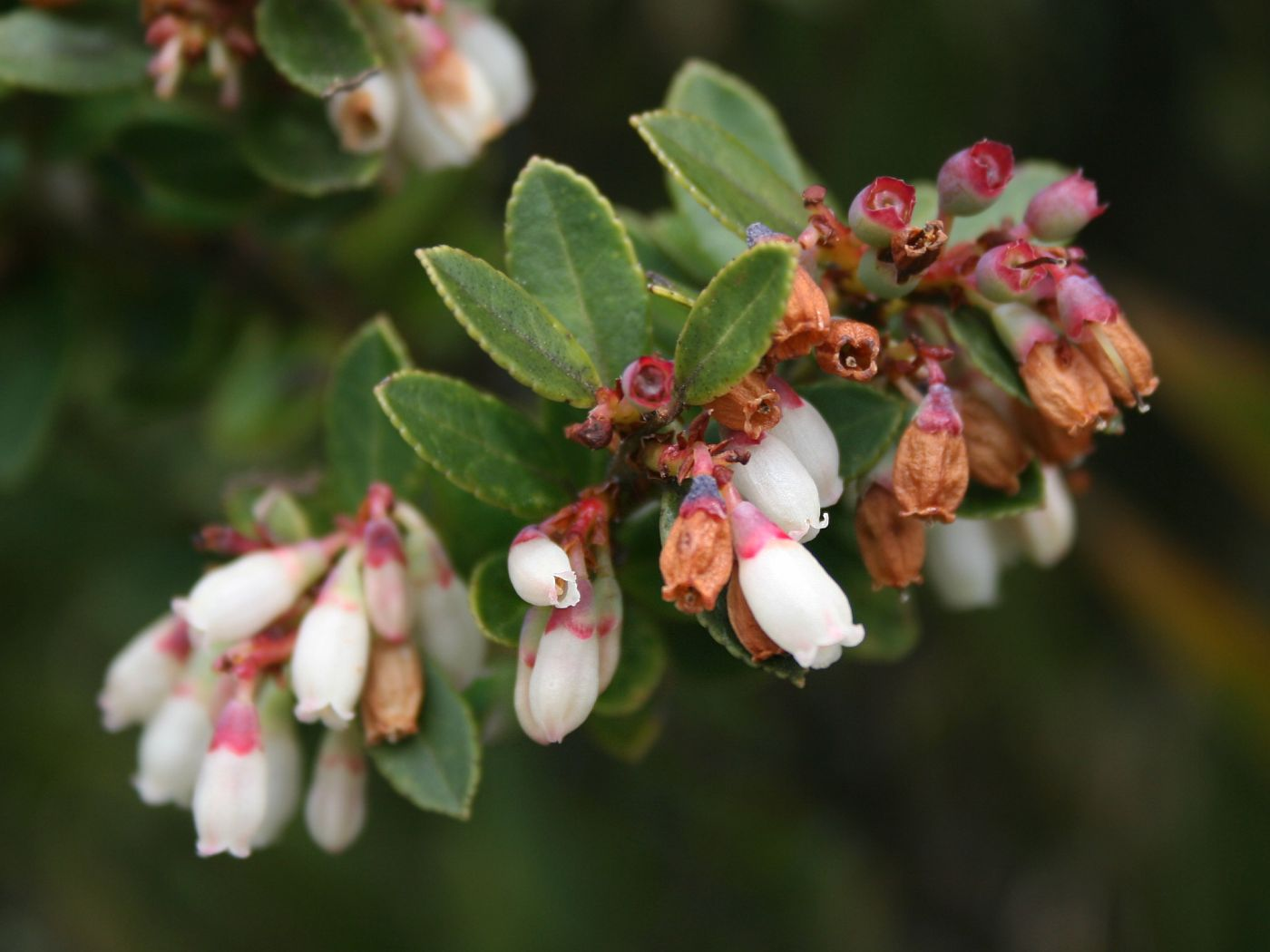

Conservation status
- Least Concern (IUCN 3.1)

Scientific classification
- Kingdom: Plantae
- Clade: Tracheophytes
- Clade: Angiosperms
- Clade: Eudicots
- Clade: Asterids
- Order: Ericales
- Family: Ericaceae
- Genus: Vaccinium
- Section: Vaccinium sect. Pyxothamnus
- Species: V. floribundum

Binomial name
- Vaccinium floribundum Kunth 1819

Synonyms
- Synonymy: Epigynium floribundum Klotzsch; Metagonia marginata (Dunal) Nutt.; Vaccinium crenulatum Dunal; Vaccinium dasygynum S.F. Blake; Vaccinium leiandrum S.F.Blake; Vaccinium marginatum Dunal; Vaccinium moritzianum Klotzsch; Vaccinium mortinia Benth.; Vaccinium polystachyum Benth.; Vaccinium ramosissimum Dunal; Vaccinium tatei Rusby; Vaccinium thymifolium Klotzsch

= Vaccinium floribundum =

Berry and plant

Vaccinium floribundum, commonly known as mortiño, pushgay or Andean blueberry, is a South American plant species.

== Description ==
The slender shrub can reach 2–3 metres (6 1/2–10 feet) tall or it can be dwarf and prostrate. It has green foliage.

The plant has pink flowers. The round berries are blue to almost blck with a whitish bloom and about 8 millimetres (1/4 inch) across.

== Distribution and habitat ==
The species grows in the northern Andes, particularly in Ecuador, Colombia, Venezuela, and Bolivia, at elevations from 2,800 to 4,000 metres (9,200 to 13,000 ft).

== Uses ==
The fruit is edible, but sometimes of a low quality in its wild state. It is collected and eaten raw and used in preserves. It is sold at some markets and used in a Ecuadorian dish to celebrate the Day of the Dead.
