= Huascarán National Park =

World Heritage Site and national park in Peru

- IUCN category II (national park)
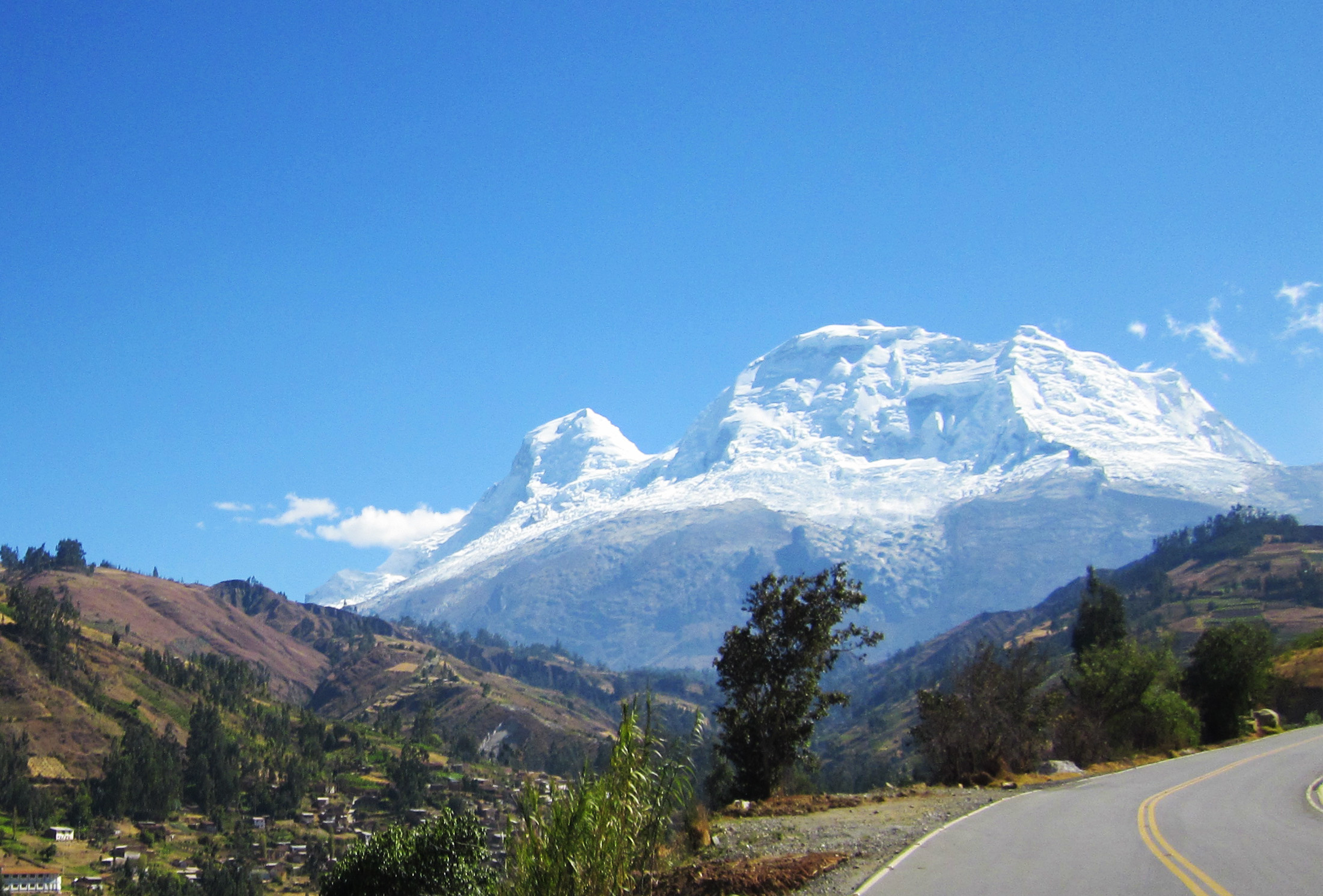
- Mount Huascarán, landmark and namesake of Huascarán National Park

- Location within Peru
- Location: Peru; Ancash
- Nearest city: Huaraz, Ancash
- Coordinates: 9°24′S 77°24′W
- Area: 340,000 ha (840,000 acres)
- Established: 1 July 1975
- Governing body: SERNANP
- Website: Parque Nacional Huascarán

UNESCO World Heritage Site
- Criteria: Natural: (vii), (viii)
- Reference: 333
- Inscription: 1985 (9th Session)

Huascarán National Park (Spanish: Parque Nacional Huascarán) is a Peruvian national park that protects most of the mountain range known as Cordillera Blanca (the world's highest tropical mountain range) which is part of the central Andes, in the region of Ancash. The park covers an area of 340,000 hectares (840,000 acres) and is managed by the Peruvian Network of Protected Natural Areas, or SERNANP (Servicio Nacional de Áreas Naturales Protegidas). Designated as a World Heritage Site in 1985 by UNESCO, Huascaráan is also a well-known mountaineering spot, and harbors a unique biodiversity with plant species such as the Queen of the Andes, trees of the genera Polylepis and Buddleja, and animals such as spectacled bears, condors, vicunas, and tarucas.

The park is approximately 150 kilometers (93 mi) long from north to south and averages about 25 kilometers (16 mi) in width. The western slope of the Cordillera Blanca drains to the Pacific Ocean via the Santa River and the eastern slopes drain to the Marañón River and ultimately to the Amazon River and the Atlantic Ocean.

== History ==
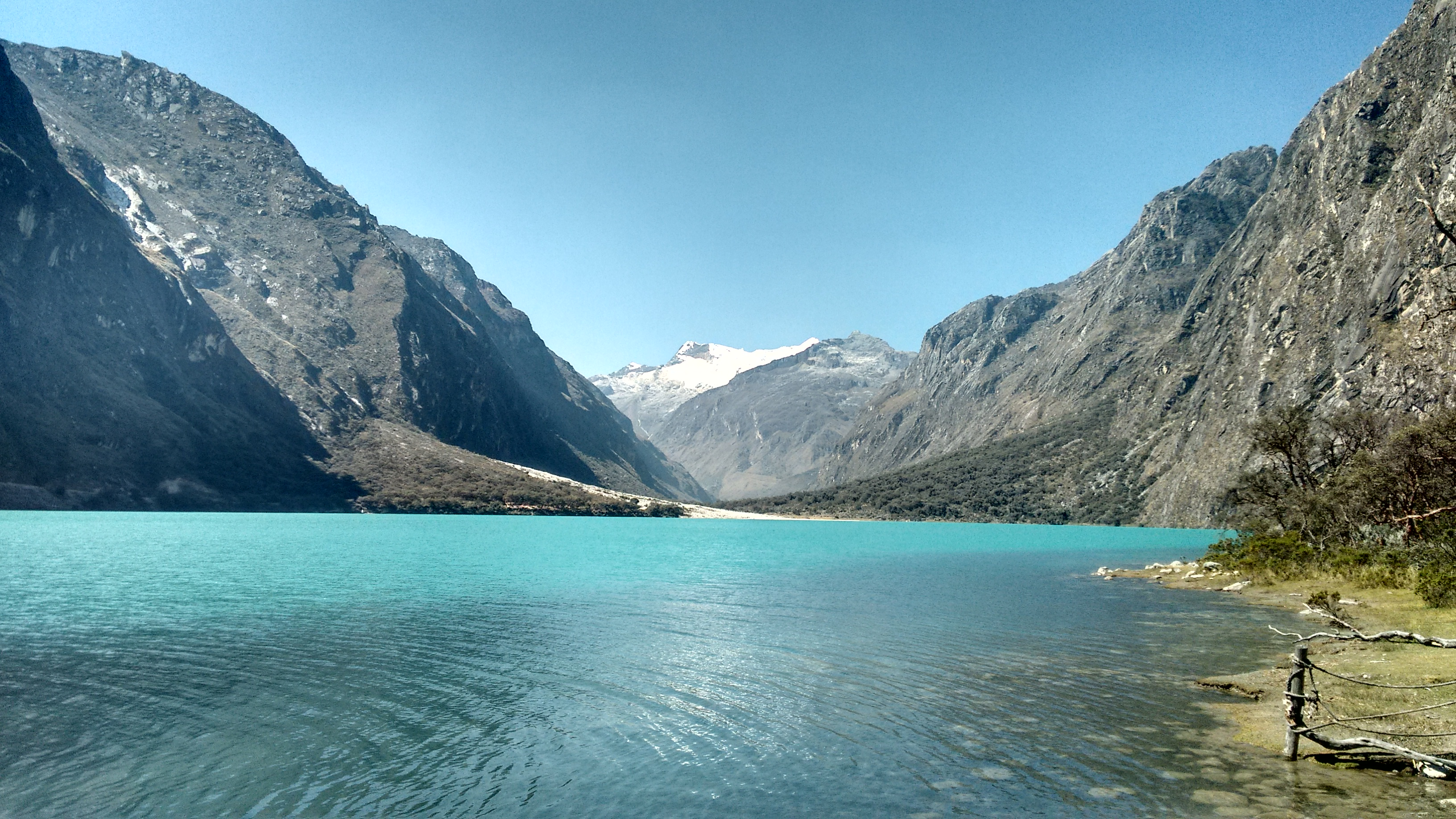
One of the Llanganuco Lakes, inside the park.

Official efforts to protect this area started in 1960, when Senator Augusto Guzmán Robles presented a bill to the Peruvian Congress for the creation of Huascarán National Park. In 1963, the Forestry and Hunting Service (Servicio Forestal y de Caza) presented a preliminary project for the delimitation of the Cordillera Blanca National Park, covering an area of 321,000 hectares (790,000 acres). On 18 February 1966, a government resolution prohibiting the logging and hunting of native species in the area of the Cordillera Blanca was issued. Later that year, the Patronage of Huascarán National Park was formed in Yungay. In 1967, Curry Slaymaker and Joel Albrecht, Peace Corps volunteers, formulated delimitation proposal on an area of 85,000 hectares (210,000 acres); and simultaneously, the Forest Regional Service of Huaraz established the vicuña and queen-of the-Andes surveillance zone for an area of approximately 10,000 hectares (25,000 acres). Finally, on 1 July 1975, Huascarán National Park was created by decree No. 0622-75-AG, with an extension of 340,000 hectares (840,000 acres).

Definite delimitation of Huascarán National Park was possible through the reversion of land to state control by means of compensated land expropriation. The park's boundaries avoided the inclusion of settlements when possible, but several communities continue to raise livestock, although park authorities try to regulate the practice.

In 1977, UNESCO recognized Huascarán National Park as a Biosphere Reserve, which covers the Santa River valley, well beyond the park's boundaries, and includes many villages and towns. In 1985 the park was declared a World Heritage Site.

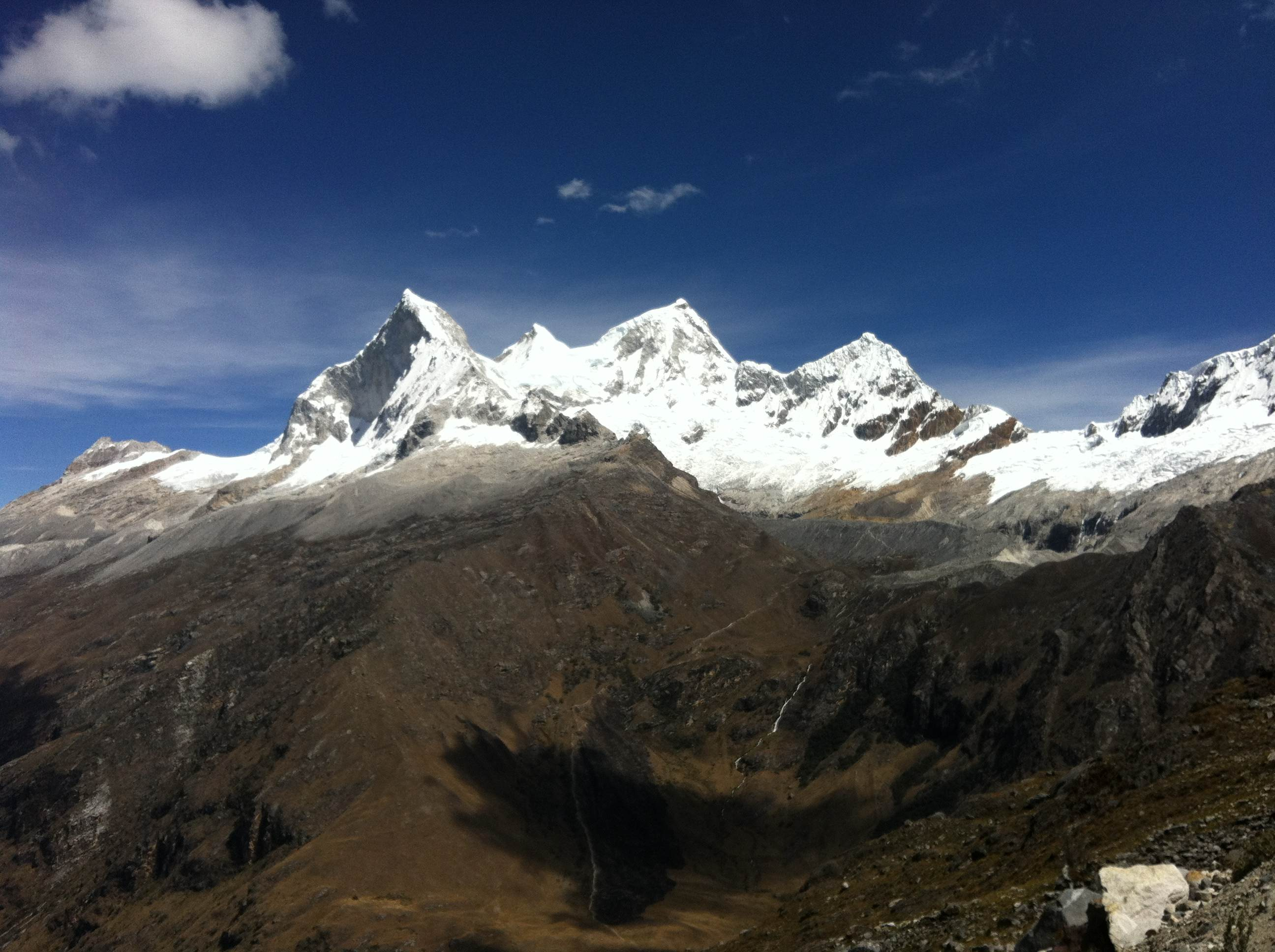
Huandoy, one of the most popular mountains inside the park.

== Geography ==
Huascarán National Park protects the Cordillera Blanca, which is the world's highest tropical mountain range. Located in the central Peruvian Andes, the park's 340,000 hectares (840,000 acres) cover an elevational range from around 2,500 meters (8,200 ft) to the several snow-capped peaks above 6,000 meters (20,000 ft). Among those peaks are Huascarán (Peru's highest at 6,768 meters (22,205 ft)), Huandoy, Copa, Huantsán and many others.

Other geographical features inside the park include: U-shaped valleys, 660 tropical glaciers (the largest glaciated area in the tropics), 300 glacial lakes and high plateaus intersected by ravines with torrential creeks.

== Climate ==
The climate in the park has two well defined seasons: a rainy season from December to March and a dry season from April to November. During the rainy season thunderstorms are frequent and the fields and mountain slopes are covered in many shades of green; however, the dry season brings sunshine almost every day and cloudless but cold nights. Daily temperatures in the rainy season can go from a maximum of 20 °C (68 °F) to a minimum of 5 °C (41 °F); while in the dry season the maximum can be 24 °C (75 °F) and the minimum 2 °C (36 °F).

== Ecology ==
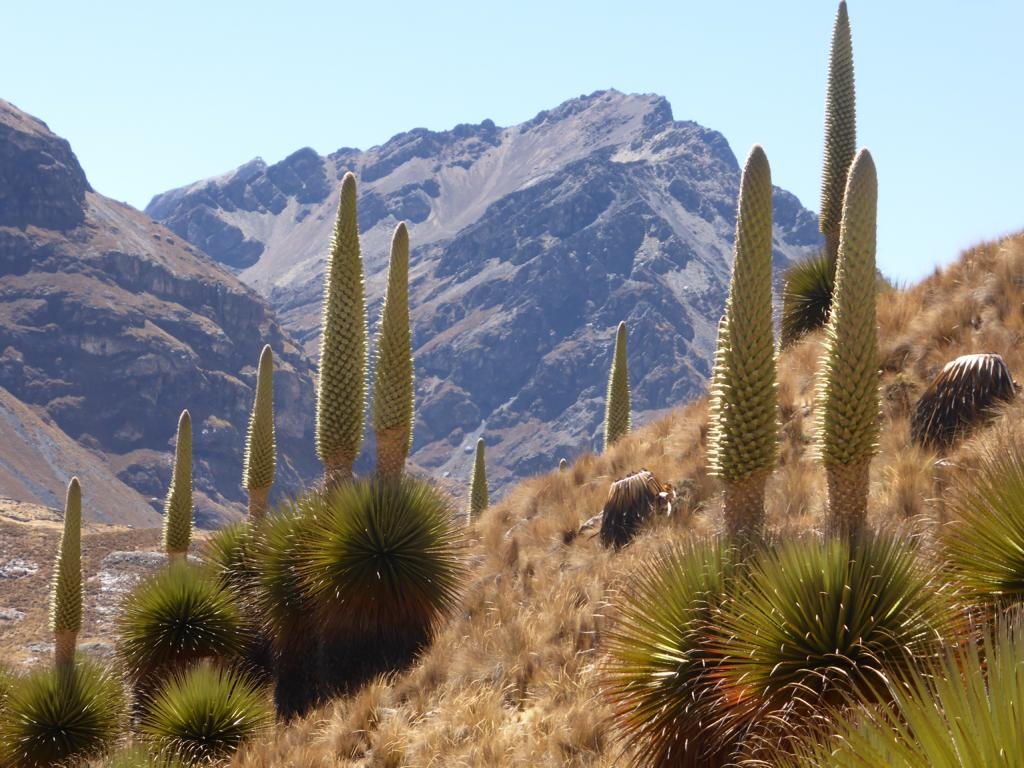
Queen of the Andes (Puya raimondii) growing inside the park.

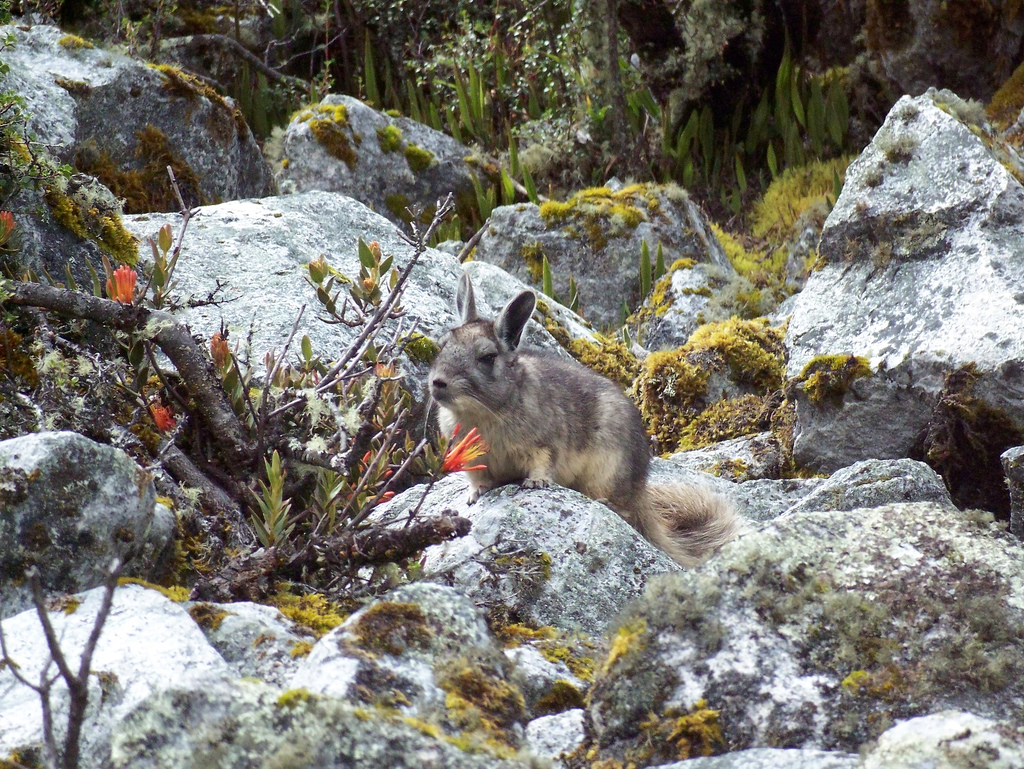
Vizcacha in Huascarán National Park.

Being the highest tropical mountain range in the world, the Cordillera Blanca boasts a variety of climates from subalpine to alpine and tundra. The valleys and mountain slopes are covered with scattered high Andean forests and puna grassland.

=== Fauna ===
More than 120 bird species have been reported in this area including the Andean condor, the torrent duck, the puna tinamou, the brown pintail, the Andean crested duck, the giant hummingbird, the yanavico, the white-tufted grebe, the giant coot, the chiguanco thrush and the Andean gull.

More than ten species of mammals have been observed in the park, several of them endangered, including the colocolo, the Andean mountain cat, the spectacled bear, the taruca deer, the vicuña, the white-tailed deer, the puma, the northern viscacha, the long-tailed weasel, the hog-nosed skunk and the Andean fox.

=== Flora ===
Some 779 plant species have been identified inside the park, the queen of the Andes (Puya raimondii) being one of the most representative and an object of conservation. Other plant species present in the park are: Polylepis racemosa, Escallonia resinosa, Alnus acuminata, Senna birostris, Vallea stipularis, Lupinus spp., Vaccinium floribundum, Calamagrostis vicunarum, Festuca dolichophylla, Jarava ichu, Azorella spp., etc.

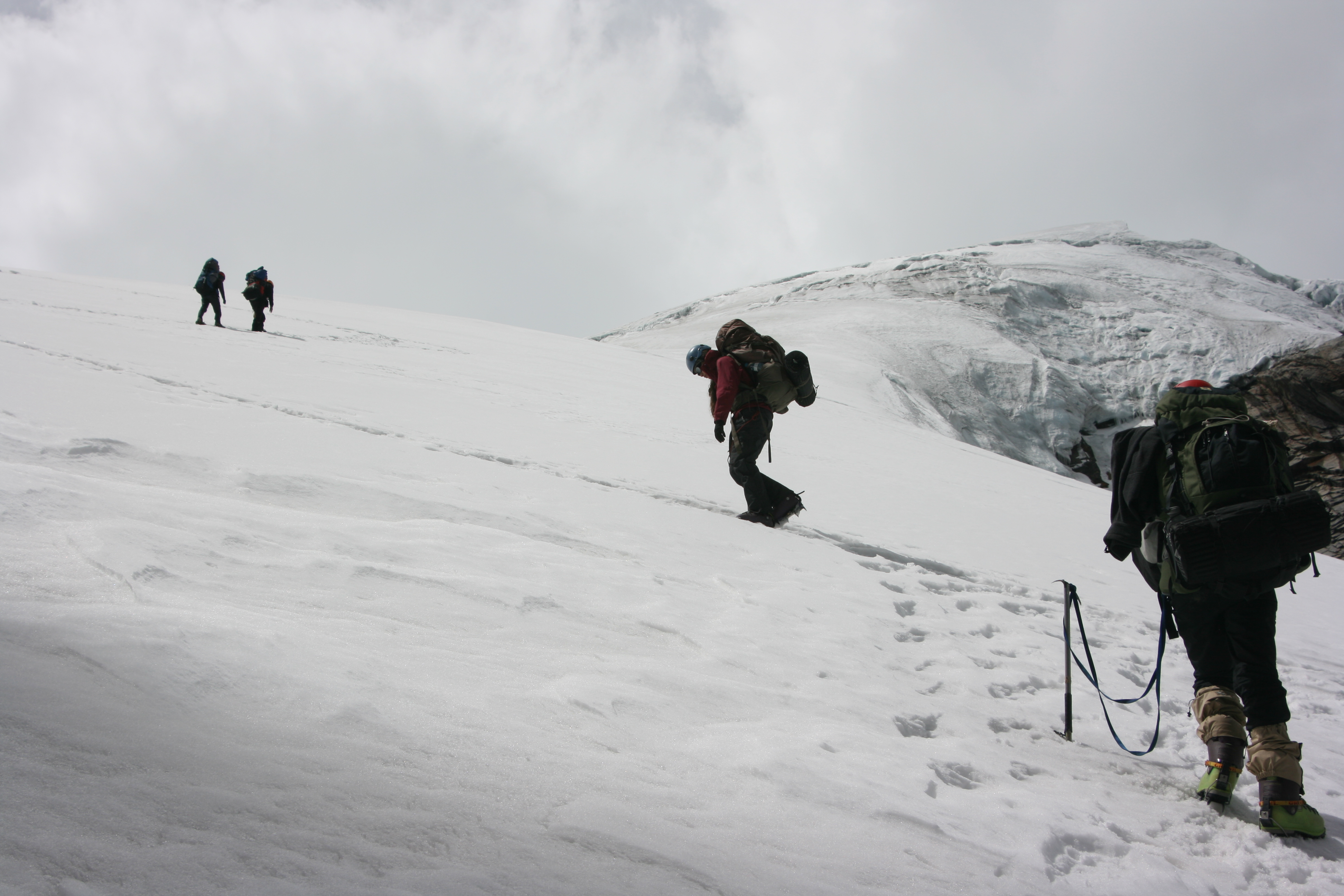
Mountaineering at Mount Copa, inside Huascarán National Park.

== Activities ==
Visitors to the park can enjoy activities such as hiking, wildlife watching, mountain biking, skiing, mountaineering, trekking and cultural tourism. Huascarán has 25 trekking routes and 102 mountaineering spots.

The park also has potential for research in many scientific areas, such as: meteorology, geology, glaciology, botany, limnology, zoology, ecology, and wildlife management.

There are 33 archaeological sites within the park, which include: cave paintings, ancient settlements, terraces for agriculture, tombs, fortresses and irrigation works. There's also a pre-Columbian road between the towns of Olleros and Chavin.

== Environmental issues ==
Among the main common threats to the park are glacier retreat due to global warming; hydropower projects; legal and illegal mining operations with low environmental standards; and loss of biodiversity to agricultural land and pastures (the latter mainly due to a conflict between the park's purposes and the ancestral rights to the land by the locals).

== See also ==
- Ancash Region
- Cordillera Blanca
- Tourism in Peru
