= Caraz District =

Coordinates: 9°03′00″S 77°48′36″W

Caraz
- District
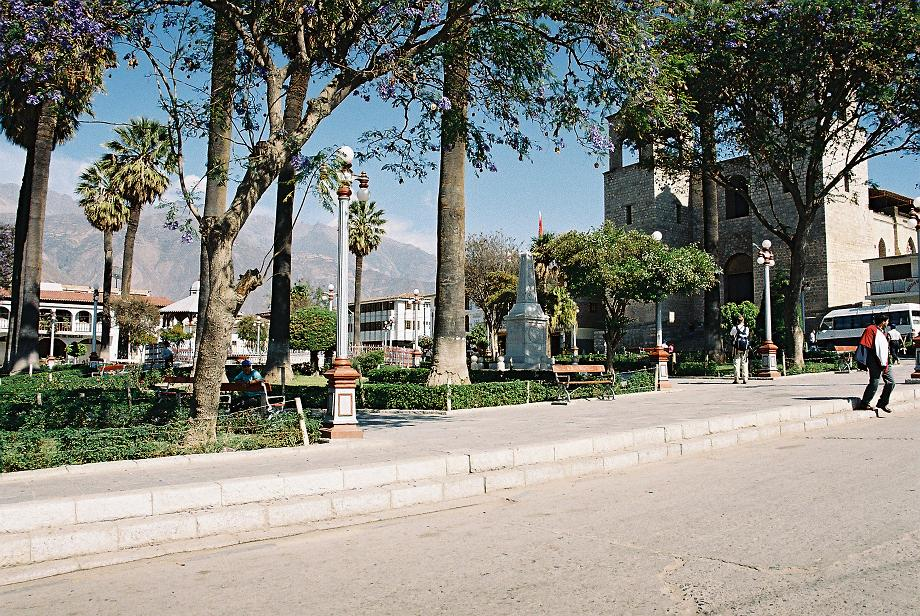
- Central plaza of Caraz

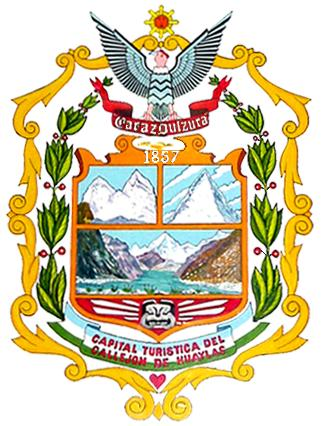
- Flag Coat of arms

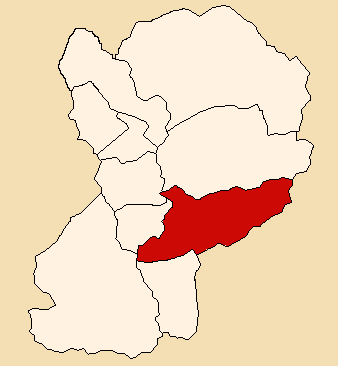
- Location of Caraz in the Huaylas province
- Country: Peru
- Region: Ancash
- Province: Huaylas
- Founded: 29 December 1856
- Capital: Caraz
- Subdivisions: 13

Government
  - Mayor: Esteban Florentino

Area
  - Total: 246.52 km^{2} (95.18 sq mi)
- Elevation: 2,285 m (7,497 ft)

Population (2017)
  - Total: 24,128
  - Density: 97.874/km^{2} (253.49/sq mi)
- Time zone: UTC-5 (PET)
- UBIGEO: 021201
- Website: municaraz.gob.pe

The Caraz District (Spanish: Distrito de Caraz) is one of 10 districts of the Huaylas Province in the Ancash Region of Peru. The capital of the district is Caraz. Its elevation is 2,285 m. In Caraz, the paved road comes from Pativilca.

The snow-capped mountains of Tullparahu (6,356 m), Pukarahu (6,259 m), Allpamayu (6,120 m) and others, frame the city. Near Parun Lake the snow summits are reflected. There are also mineral-medicinal springs like Colca and Shongor.

The settlers produce wool textiles, carpets, ponchos, straw fabrics and the renowned fruit and manjarblanco sweets known as cuarteados.

Departing from Caraz to the north, the Santa River is crossed to arrive to the Cañón del Pato. The Callejón de Huaylas has become narrow between the highest and vertical walls of rock, without any vegetation and, in this stretch, the rocks of the Cordillera Blanca and Cordillera Negra come closer (less than 5 m of distance).

To arrive to Huallanca, at the north end of the Callejón de Huaylas, 33 tunnels must be passed in a trip of 25 km, in which the Santa River breaks, roaring, the Cordillera Negra, to flow to the sea.

In Huallanca, 1,410 msnm, the hydroelectric power station of the Cañón del Pato is located. In this place, the highway that goes up to Chimbote began. This highway is planned over the ancient embankment of the railroad Chimbote-Huallanca that was destroyed by a cataclysm in 1970. In this place, it also began the highway that leads to the Callejón de Conchucos.

== Geography ==
The district is located in the south-eastern part of the province at an elevation of 2,285m, 67 km from the regions capital Huaraz.

The Cordillera Blanca traverses the district. Some of the highest mountains of the district are listed below:

- Artesonraju
- Chakrarahu
- Pirámide
- Putaqa
- Qaras
- Qarwa Pampa
- Rukutu Punta
- Wamanpinta
- Tullparahu

== History ==
The district was founded by Don Simón Bolívar on December 29, 1856.

== Political division ==
The Caraz District is divided into 13 hamlets (Spanish: caseríos, singular: caserío) and 6 (Spanish: anexos, singular: anexo):

=== Hamlets ===
- Alluca
- Chuqichaka
- Quchamarka
- Connopa
- Cruz viva
- Qullaspampa
- Cumpayhuara
- Wawra
- L Rinconada
- Llaqshu
- Pawas
- Yuco
- Yuracoto

=== Annexes ===
- Aircan
- Caccho
- Chosica
- Chungada
- Coto
- Hoyada
