= Sentilo =

Mountain in Peru

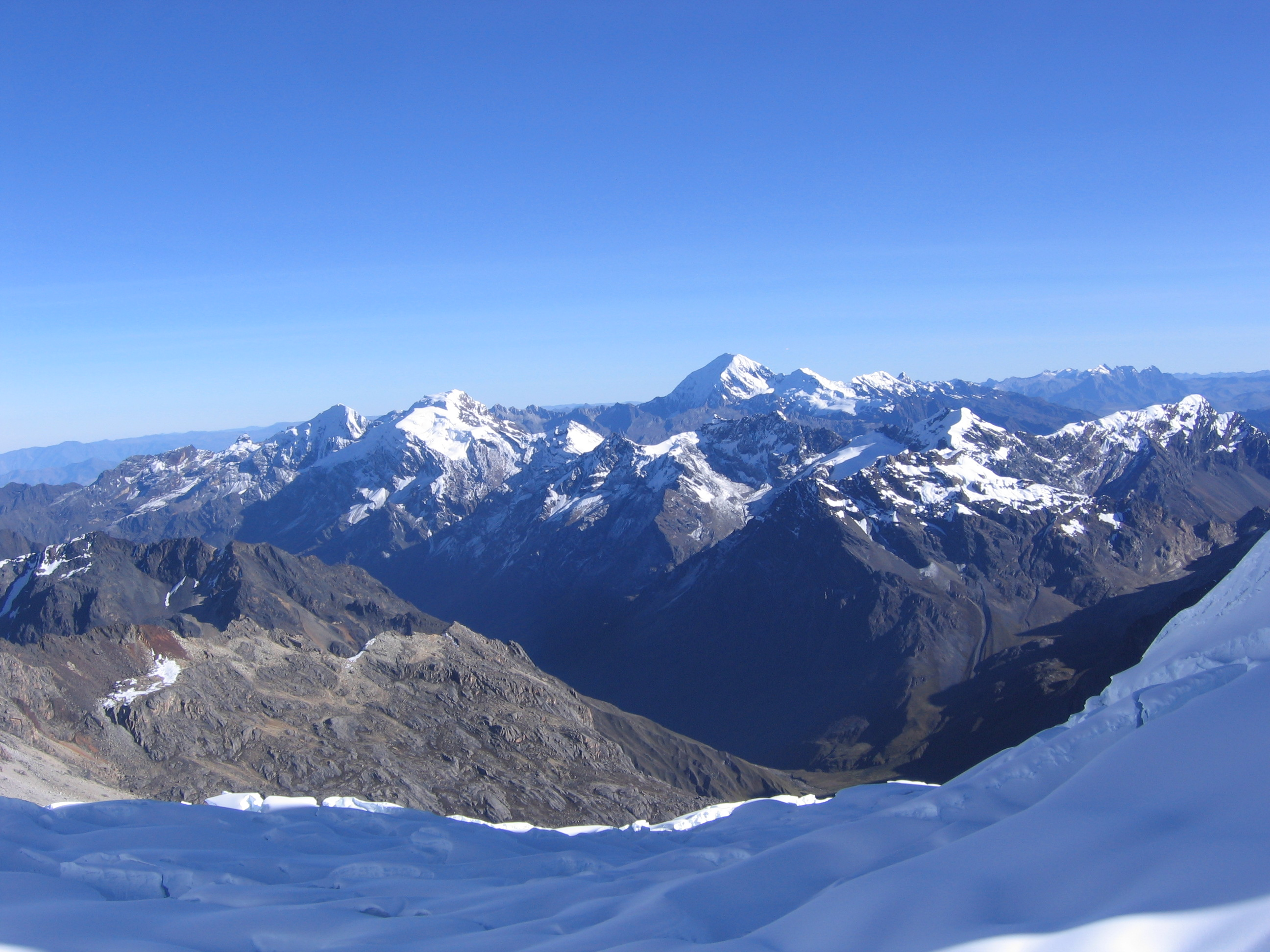
- Sentilo (center right, snowless) as seen from the Alpamayo-Quitaraju plateau

Highest point
- Elevation: 5,100 m (16,700 ft)
- Coordinates: 8°55′56″S 77°36′08″W

Geography
- Location within Peru
- Location: Ancash Region
- Parent range: Andes, Cordillera Blanca

Climbing
- First ascent: 1-1955.

Sentilo (possibly Quechua for peccary) is a 5,100-metre-high (16,700 ft) mountain in the Cordillera Blanca in the Andes of Peru. It is located in Ancash Region, Huaylas Province, Santa Cruz District. Sentilo lies at the Punta Unión pass, the highest point of the Santa Cruz valley, south of the mountains Rinrijirca and Pucajirca, southwest of Taulliraju, and northeast of mountains Artesonraju and Parón.

Santa Cruz Creek originates near Sentilo.

== See also ==
- Lake Jatuncocha
- Lake Ichiccocha
- Quitaraju
- Caraz (mountain)
