= Tawlli Qaqa =

Mountain in Peru

- Location within Peru

Highest point
- Elevation: 4,800 m (15,700 ft)
- Coordinates: 8°55′01″S 77°40′16″W

Geography
- Location: Peru, Ancash Region
- Parent range: Andes, Cordillera Blanca

Tawlli Qaqa (Quechua tawlli a kind of legume, qaqa rock, "tawlli rock", also spelled Taullijaja) is a mountain in the Cordillera Blanca in the Andes of Peru which reaches a height of approximately 4,800 m (15,700 ft). It is located in the Ancash Region, Huaylas Province, Santa Cruz District. Tawlli Qaqa lies at the Yuraqmayu valley (Santa Cruz gorge) south of Kitarahu, southwest of Kitaqucha (Quechua for "dam lake") and northwest of Hatunqucha (Quechua for "big lake").
