= Wiqruqucha (Huaylas) =

Lake in the Huaylas Province, Ancash Region, Peru

- Location within Peru
- Location: Peru; Ancash Region
- Coordinates: 8°46′24″S 77°35′55″W

Wiqruqucha (Quechua wiqru twisted, bent qucha lake, "bent lake", hispanicized spelling Huecrococha) is a lake in Peru located in the Ancash Region, Huaylas Province, Yuracmarca District. It is situated in the Cordillera Blanca, northeast of Millwaqucha and Pilanku, and north of Pukahirka and a lake named Shuytuqucha.
