= Kitty Calhoun =

American mountain climber

Catherine Howell Calhoun (formerly Kitty Calhoun Grissom; born 1960) is an American mountain climber.

== Early life ==
Calhoun was raised in Greenville, South Carolina. Her father, a corporate lawyer and a collateral descendant of John C. Calhoun, sent her to an exclusive private school in Greenville where she excelled in sports, particularly hockey and skiing. She began rock climbing through an Outward Bound course at the age of 18 and took up ice climbing at 19. She attended the University of Vermont and graduated in 1982 with a degree in recreation management.

Calhoun's parents separated while she was in high school, and her younger brother Gib died by suicide shortly after she left college.

== Mountaineering ==
Calhoun began her career in mountain climbing as an Outward Bound guide in North Carolina after graduating from college. She later became a guide for the American Alpine Institute, with whom she led climbs in Peru, Bolivia, Alaska, Argentina, and Nepal. On a personal trip to Peru in 1984, she climbed Pirámide, Alpamayo and Qitarahu. In 1987 she was the first American woman to climb Dhaulagiri in Nepal, marking her first 8,000-meter peak, although she and her teammates had no Himalayan climbing experience. She subsequently received invitations to climb Mount Everest and join other high-profile expeditions, but she opted instead to lead her own expeditions with close friends. In recognition of her second 8,000-meter summit—an expedition she led up Makalu's highly technical West Pillar route—she was awarded the Robert and Miriam Underhill Award, the highest honor given by the American Alpine Club. She was the first woman to climb Makalu, the world's fifth-highest mountain.

In 1991 Calhoun relocated to Seattle and undertook a Master of Business Administration, which she completed in 1993. After receiving her MBA, she founded Exum Mountain Adventures, a guiding company based in Salt Lake City. In 2006, she climbed the Diamond Couloir on the south face of Mount Kenya with Jay Smith.

== Personal life ==
Calhoun was formerly married to Colin Grissom, one of her climbing partners, with whom she has one son. She currently lives in Castle Valley, Utah.
