= Santa Cruz District, Ancash =

Coordinates: 8°52′14″S 77°54′19″W

Santa Cruz
- District
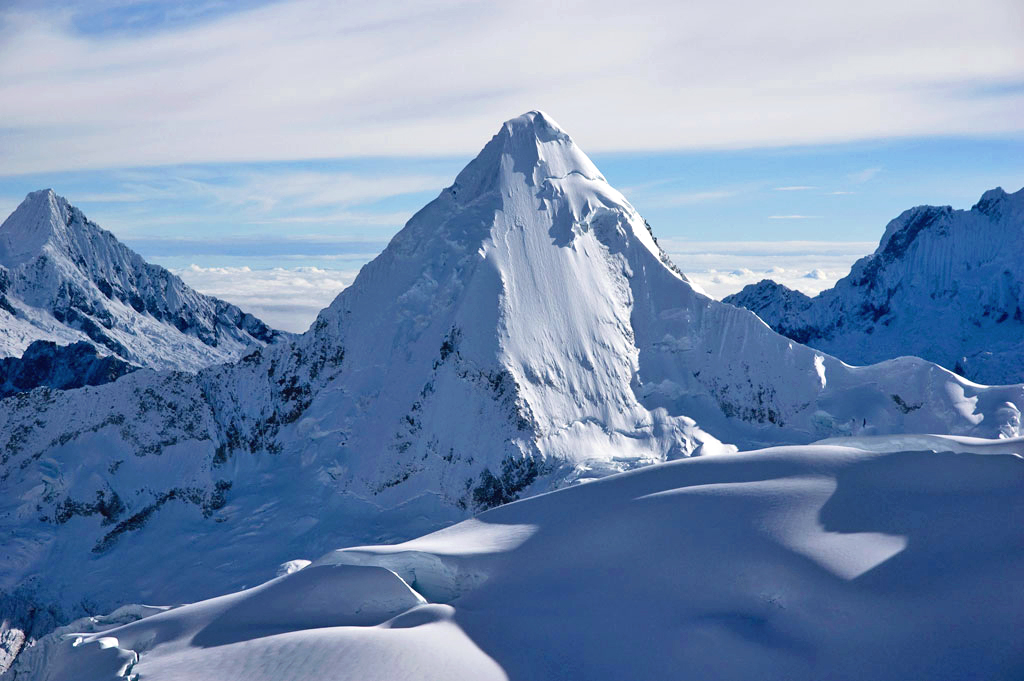
- Artisunrahu, Santa Cruz District

- Coat of arms

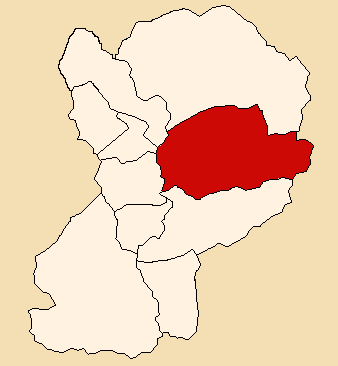
- Location of Santa Cruz in the Huaylas province
- Country: Peru
- Region: Ancash
- Province: Huaylas
- Founded: July 10, 1945
- Capital: Huaripampa

Government
  - Mayor: Gustavo Odiel Chavez Crispin

Area
  - Total: 332.78 km^{2} (128.49 sq mi)
- Elevation: 2,900 m (9,500 ft)
- Time zone: UTC-5 (PET)
- UBIGEO: 021208
- Website: munisantacruz.gob.pe

The Santa Cruz District (Spanish: Distrito de Santa Cruz) is one of 10 districts of the Huaylas Province in the Ancash Region of Peru. The capital of the district is Huaripampa.

== Geography ==
The district is located in the central-eastern part of the province at an elevation of 2,900 m.

The Cordillera Blanca traverses the district. Some of the highest mountains of the district are listed below:

- Allpamayu
- Aqu Punta
- Artesonraju
- Chuchu Rumi
- Kitarahu
- Pirqa Rumi
- Pukahirka
- Pukarahu
- Puma Pampa
- Qaras
- Rinrihirka
- Sintiru
- Suyt'uqucha
- Tawlli Qaqa
- Tawllirahu
- Taya Pampa
- Wamanpinta

== Ethnic groups ==
The people in the district are mainly indigenous citizens of Quechua descent. Quechua is the language which the majority of the population (86.95%) learnt to speak in childhood, 12.63% of the residents started speaking using the Spanish language (2007 Peru Census).

== See also ==
- Allpamayu (river)
- Hatunqucha (Pirqarumi)
- Hatunqucha (Qaras)
- Ichikqucha
- Tawlliqucha
- Yuraqmayu
- Yuraqqucha
