= Huata District, Huaylas =

Coordinates: 9°00′58″S 77°51′39″W

Huata
- District
- Coat of arms

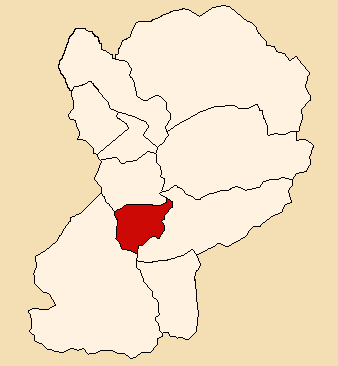
- Location of Huata in the Huaylas province
- Country: Peru
- Region: Ancash
- Province: Huaylas
- Founded: January 2, 1857
- Capital: Huata
- Subdivisions: 1 village, 13 hamlets and 40 anexos

Government
  - Mayor: Miguel Abilio Terry Guerrero

Area
  - Total: 70.69 km^{2} (27.29 sq mi)
- Elevation: 2,736 m (8,976 ft)

Population (2002 est.)
  - Total: 1,941
  - Density: 27.46/km^{2} (71.12/sq mi)
- Time zone: UTC-5 (PET)
- UBIGEO: 021203
- Website: munihuata.gob.pe

The Huata District (Spanish: Distrito de Huata) is the smallest of the 10 districts of the Huaylas Province in the Ancash Region of Peru. The capital of the district is the village of Huata.

== History ==
The district was founded on January 2, 1857.

== Location ==
The district is located in the central part of the province at an elevation of 2,736m in the black mountains (Spanish: Cordillera Negra), neighboring district is the Caraz district in which the provinces capital Caraz is located, 17 km from the village of Huata.

== Political division ==
The Huata District is divided into 1 village (Spanish: pueblos, singular: pueblo), 6 hamlets (Spanish: caseríos, singular: caserío) and 40 (Spanish: anexos, singular: anexo):

=== Villages ===
- Huata

=== Hamlets ===
- Cancho
- Inchapampa
- Parcap
- Racracallan
- Ranca
- Tambillo

=== Anexos ===
- Caulla
- Cashapuro
- Animas
- Molino
- Tunanpuquio
- Shaquipampa
- Tranca
- Huerco
- Pichipuquio
- Puca Rumi
- Mosqueta
- Mandahuas
- Colcash
- Anascallan (Choccho)
- Rachinac
- Higos
- Cotu
- Cocha Cocha
- Lauricocha
- La Fronda
- Ampicallan
- Zanja
- Cahu Nuevo
- Pato Raca
- Cucuri
- Ancaranac
- Pichi Alta
- Cedro
- Quespac
- Huachcuyoc
- Nauya
- Yuracpacha
- Alalacpampa
- Pacayo (Pucllanca)
- Maraypampa
- Malambo
- Ocuyoc
- Rayan
- Huancayoc
- Ache

== Capital ==
The capital of the Huata district is the city of Huata.

== Climate ==
The district has a temperate and dry climate with a temperature varying from 12 to 19 degrees Celsius.

== Traditional festivals ==
- VIRGEN DEL ASUNCION on August 15
- FIESTA DEL MILAGRO on September 11
- VIRGEN DE LAS MERCEDES on September 24
- FIESTA DE ANIVERSARIO DE CREACION POLITICA on January 2
