= T'uruqucha (Huaylas) =

Lake in the Ancash Region, Peru

- Location within Peru
- Location: Peru; Ancash Region
- Coordinates: 8°44′05″S 77°40′08″W

T'uruqucha (Quechua t'uru mud, qucha lake, "mud lake", also spelled Torococha) is a lake in the northern part of the Cordillera Blanca in the Andes of Peru. It is located in the Ancash Region, Huaylas Province, Yuracmarca District, northeast of Pilanku.
