= Quyllur =

Quyllur (Quechua for 'star') may refer to:

- Collor, an archaeological site in Peru
- Quyllur (Lima), a mountain in the Andes of Peru
- Quyllur (star), a star in a distant galaxy cluster

== See also ==
- Quyllur Urmana, a lake in Peru
- Quyllurqucha, several lakes with the same name
