= Pergarumi =

Mountain in Peru

- Location within Peru

Highest point
- Elevation: 5,000 m (16,000 ft)
- Coordinates: 8°52′22″S 77°44′34″W

Geography
- Location: Peru, Ancash Region
- Parent range: Andes, Cordillera Blanca

Pergarumi or Pirqa Rumi (possibly from Quechua pirqa wall, rumi stone) is a mountain in the northern part of the Cordillera Blanca in the Andes of Peru which reaches a height of approximately 5,000 m (16,404 ft). It is located in the Ancash Region, Huaylas Province, Santa Cruz District. Pergarumi lies northwest of Santa Cruz, south of the lakes Atuncocha and Rajucocha.
