= Tumshukayko =

Archaeological site in Peru

Coordinates: 9.03784°S 77.81467°W

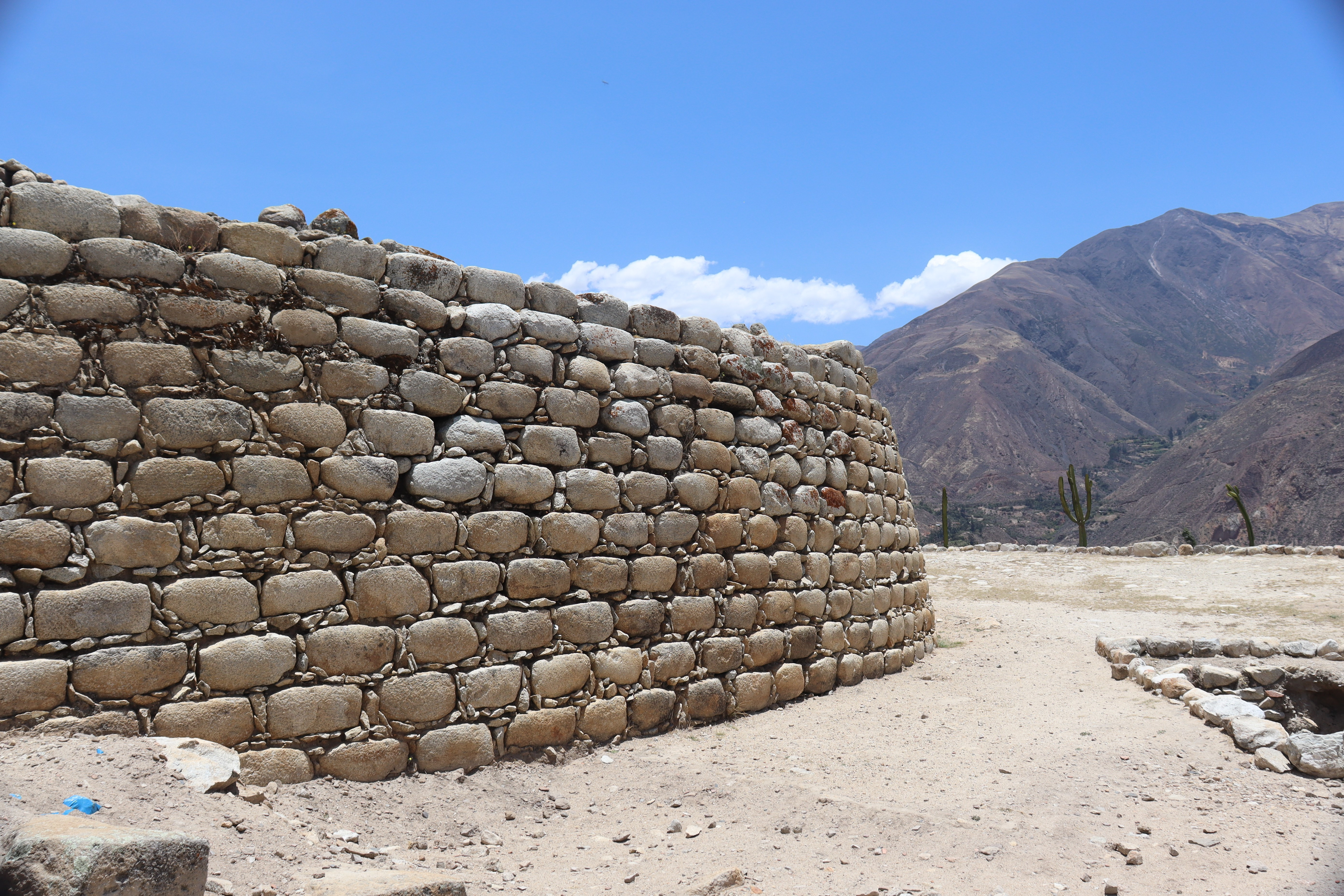
- Interactive map of Tumshukayko

Tumshukayko is a pre-Inca archeological site near Caraz, Huaylas Province, Ancash Region, Peru.

The site was only recently discovered and remains under research. Its main structures are found on the right bank of Llullán river, on the west flank of the Cordillera Blanca, and 1 km north of the city of Caraz. It stands at an elevation of 2300m above sea level. Recent investigations suggest that the site dates from the Late Preceramic (around 2000 BCE), even though upper sediment shows evidence of a later occupation (around 300 BCE - 300 CE), perhaps by the Recuay culture.

The earliest structures were probably built sometime between the occupation of La Galgada (3000–2000 BCE) and the era of the Chavín culture (1200–300 BCE). The artistic production resembles many of those found at the Moxeke complex in the Casma Valley.

Around 1873, the Italian explorer Antonio Raimondi described the location as a "hill", partially destroyed, built with huge stone walls. In 1919, Dr. Julio C. Tello confirmed this description, writing that the structure includes platforms and terraces forming interior aisles and stairways. Work was performed around 1990 to remove debris and waste.

== Importance ==
In accordance with the general outline of the buildings, it seems to have served as a huge monumental center.

== Site description ==
Tumshukayko stands 1 km north of the present-day city of Caraz, and was apparently a center for those people living in the surrounding areas. The fine stonework forms a circular structure, consisting of platforms, terraces, stairways, and lower semi-circular walls, separated by about 2.4m. The empty space was filled with loose rocks and earth. The outside walls are decorated with geometrical sculptures and carvings.

The structure extends approximately 300m in diameter and 25m in elevation. The most outstanding artefacts are the stone heads (cabezas clavas) and triangular stones, which are highly suggestive of a connection to the early Chavín culture.
