= Kita Raqsa =

Mountain in Peru

- Location within Peru

Highest point
- Elevation: 4,200 m (13,800 ft)
- Coordinates: 8°45′18″S 77°44′53″W

Geography
- Location: Peru, Ancash Region
- Parent range: Andes, Cordillera Blanca

Kita Raqsa (Quechua kita dam, raqsa order, work shift, change, alternate guarding, 'alternate guarding of the dam', also spelled Quitaracsa) is a mountain in the Cordillera Blanca in the Andes of Peru which reaches a height of approximately 4,200 m (13,780 ft). It is located in the Ancash Region, Huaylas Province, Yuracmarca District. Kita Raqsa lies northwest of Pilanku (Quechua for "dam").

Kita Raqsa is also the name of the village at the foot of the mountain and the name of the river which flows along its southern slope. It is a right affluent of the Santa River.
