= Lake Arhuaycocha =

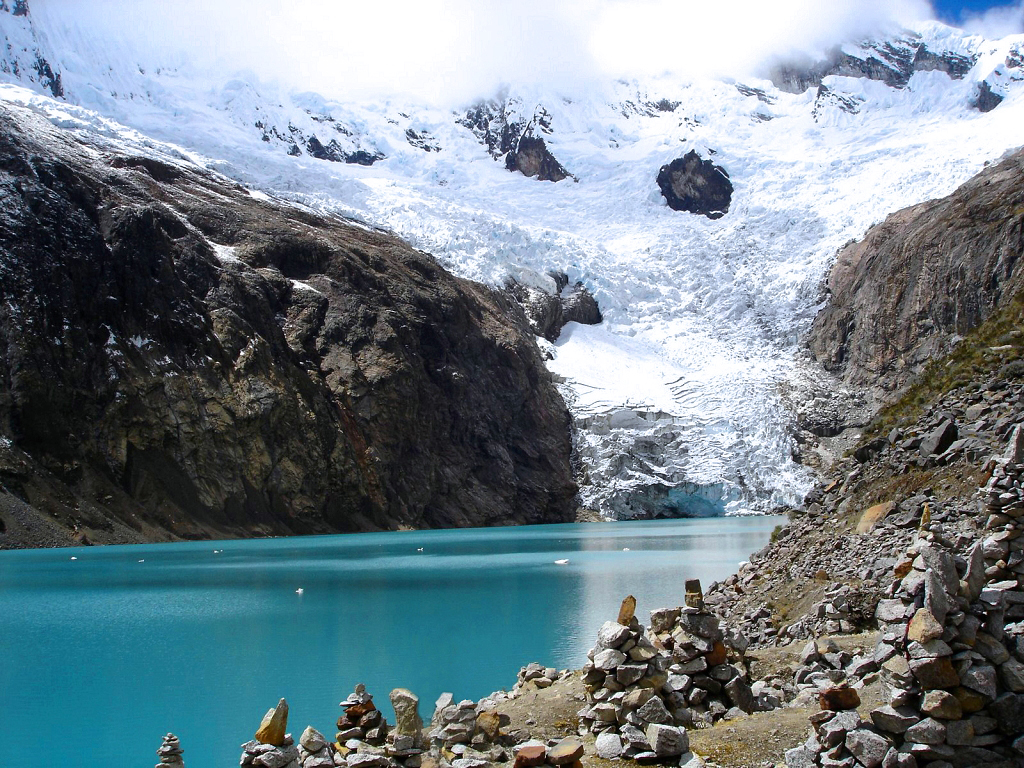

- Location within Peru
- Location: Peru; Ancash Region
- Coordinates: 8°53′16″S 77°37′36″W
- Type: Periglacial lake
- Primary inflows: Arhuay glacier

Lake Arhuaycocha is a lake in Peru, in the Ancash Region, Huaylas Province, Santa Cruz District. It is at the foot of the mountains Pucajirca and Rinrijirca and the Arhuay glacier.
