= Yuraqqucha (disambiguation) =

Yuraqqucha (Quechua yuraq white, qucha lake, also spelled Yurac Cocha, Yuracc Ccocha, Yuracc Cocha, Yuraccocha, Yurajcocha) may refer to:

- Yuraqqucha, a lake in the Junín Region, Huancayo Province, Chongos Alto District, Peru
- Yuraqqucha (Ancash), a lake in the Ancash Region, Peru
- Yuraqqucha (Lima-Junín), a mountain at a small lake of the same name on the border of the Junín Region and the Lima Region, Peru
- Yuraqqucha (Jauja), a lake in the Junín Region, Jauja Province, Peru
- Yuraqqucha (Yauli), a mountain at a small lake of the same name in the Junín Region, Yauli Province, Peru
