= Quyllurqucha =

Quyllurqucha (Quechua for "star lake") may refer to:

- Quylluqucha or Quyllurqucha, a lake in Junín Region, Peru
- Quyllurqucha (Ancash), a lake in Ancash Region, Peru
- Quyllurqucha (Huaylas), a mountain in Huaylas, Peru
- Quyllurqucha (Lima), a lake in Lima Region, Peru
