= Collpa Janca =

Mountain in Peru

- Location within Peru

Highest point
- Elevation: 4,800 m (15,700 ft)
- Coordinates: 8°40′06″S 77°45′45″W

Geography
- Location: Peru, Ancash Region
- Parent range: Andes, Cordillera Blanca

Collpa Janca (possibly from Quechua qullpa salty, saltpeter, hanka snowcapped ridge or peak; ice, "salty ridge") is a mountain in the northern part of the Cordillera Blanca in the Andes of Peru which reaches a height of approximately 4,800 m (15,748 ft). It is located in the Ancash Region, Corongo Province, Cusca District, and in the Huaylas Province, Yuracmarca District. Collpa Janca lies northeast of Champará.
