= Qulluta =

Qulluta (Quechua for mortar, also spelled Collota, Jollota) may refer to:

- Qulluta (Ancash), a mountain in the Huaylas Province, Ancash Region, Peru
- Qulluta (Huancavelica), a mountain in the Huancavelica Region, Peru
- Qulluta (Recuay), a mountain in the Recuay Province, Ancash Region, Peru
- Qulluta (Sihuas), a mountain in the Sihuas Province, Ancash Region, Peru
