= Misquicocha =

Mountain in Peru

- Location within Peru

Highest point
- Elevation: 5,000 m (16,000 ft)
- Coordinates: 8°42′16″S 77°49′02″W

Geography
- Location: Peru, Ancash Region
- Parent range: Andes, Cordillera Blanca

Misquicocha (possibly from Quechua misk'i sweet, qucha lake "sweet lake") is mountain in the north of the Cordillera Blanca in the Andes of Peru, about 5,000 m (16,000 ft) high. It is located in the Ancash Region, Huaylas Province, Yuracmarca District. It lies southwest Champara.

Misquicocha is also the name of a group of lakes north of the mountain at 8°41′17″S 77°48′25″W.
