= Wira Wira =

Mountain in Peru

- Location within Peru

Highest point
- Elevation: 4,946 m (16,227 ft)
- Coordinates: 8°48′40″S 77°34′50″W

Geography
- Location: Peru, Ancash Region
- Parent range: Andes, Cordillera Blanca

Wira Wira (Quechua for Gnaphalium viravira, Hispanicized spelling Huira Huira) is 4,946-metre-high (16,227 ft) mountain in the north of the Cordillera Blanca in the Andes of Peru. It is located in the Ancash Region, Huaylas Province, Yuracmarca District, and in the Pomabamba Province, Pomabamba District. It lies northeast of Pukahirka.
