= Wamanpinta =

Mountain in Peru

- Location within Peru

Highest point
- Elevation: 4,800 m (15,700 ft)
- Coordinates: 8°58′29″S 77°44′24″W

Geography
- Location: Peru, Ancash Region
- Parent range: Andes, Cordillera Blanca

Wamanpinta (Quechua for Chuquiraga, also spelled Huamampinta) is a mountain in the Cordillera Blanca in the Andes of Peru which reaches a height of approximately 4,800 m (15,748 ft). It is located in the Ancash Region, Huaylas Province, on the border of the districts of Caraz and Santa Cruz. Wamanpinta lies on the southern bank of the Yuraqmayu (Santa Cruz gorge).
