= Collota (Huaylas) =

Mountain in Peru

- Location within Peru

Highest point
- Elevation: 4,716 m (15,472 ft)
- Coordinates: 8°48′15″S 77°38′58″W

Geography
- Location: Peru, Ancash Region
- Parent range: Andes, Cordillera Blanca

Collota (possibly from Quechua for mortar) is a 4,716-metre-high (15,472 ft) mountain in the north of the Cordillera Blanca in the Andes of Peru. It is located in the Ancash Region, Huaylas Province, Yuracmarca District. It lies east of Milluacocha and Pilanco.
