= Quitaraju =

Mountain in Peru

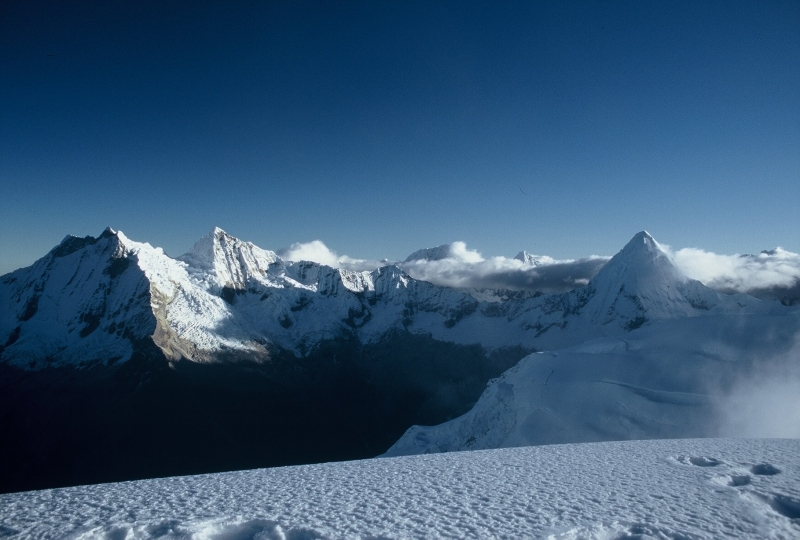
- Caraz I and II (on the left), Quitaraju and Alpamayo (visible behind the clouds) and Artesonraju (on the right)

Highest point
- Elevation: 6,036 m (19,803 ft)
- Prominence: 776 m (2,546 ft)
- Parent peak: Santa Cruz (mountain)
- Coordinates: 8°53′41″S 77°39′46″W

Geography
- Location within Peru
- Location: Ancash, Peru
- Parent range: Andes, Cordillera Blanca, Peruvian Andes

Climbing
- First ascent: June 17th 1936 - Arnold Awerzger and Erwin Schneider (Austria)

Quitaraju or Kitaraju (possibly from Ancash Quechua kita dam, Quechua rahu snow, ice) is a mountain in the Cordillera Blanca in the Andes of Peru, about 6,036 metres (19,803 ft) high. It is situated in the Ancash Region, Huaylas Province, Santa Cruz District. Quitaraju lies north of the Santa Cruz Creek and the lakes named Ichiccocha, Jatuncocha and Quitacocha, between Santa Cruz in the west and Alpamayo in the northeast. Its slopes are within the Huascarán National Park.

== Elevation ==
Other data from available digital elevation models: SRTM 6010 metres, ASTER filled 6010 metres and TanDEM-X 5961 metres. The height of the nearest key col is 3253 meters, leading to a topographic prominence of 2783 meters. Quitaraju is considered a Mountain Sub-System according to the Dominance System and its dominance is 46.11%. Its parent peak is Nevado Santa Cruz and the Topographic isolation is 4.9 kilometers.

== First Ascent ==
Quitaraju was first climbed by Arnold Awerzger and Erwin Schneider (Austria) June 17, 1936.
