= Yuracmarca District =

Coordinates: 8°45′S 77°54′W

Yuracmarca Yuraq Marka
- District
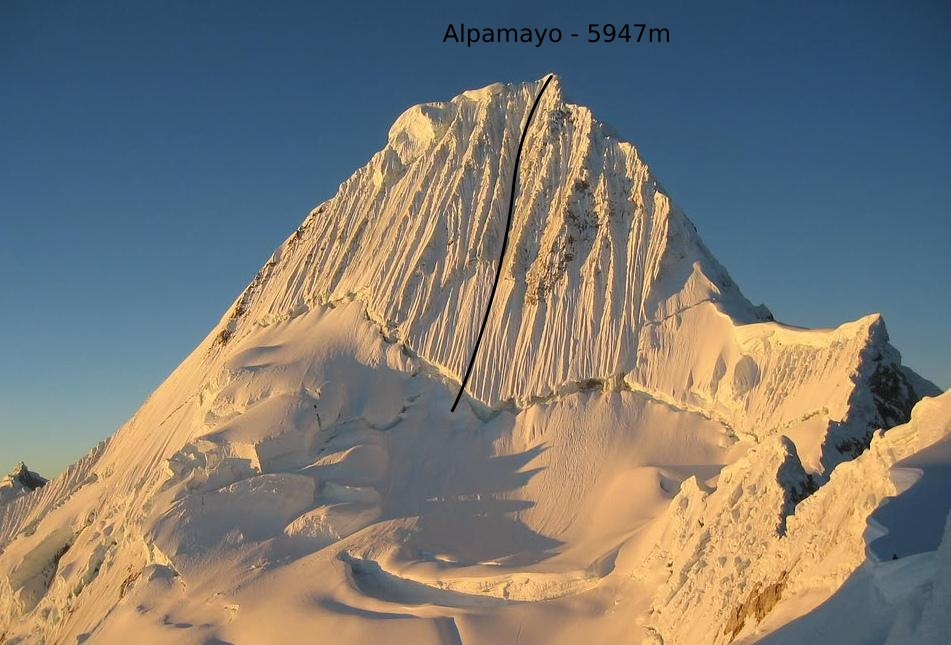
- Allpamayu on the southern border of the district

- Coat of arms

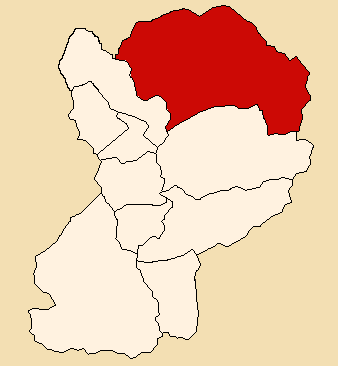
- Location of Yuracmarca in the Huaylas province
- Country: Peru
- Region: Ancash
- Province: Huaylas
- Founded: May 9, 1923
- Capital: Yuracmarca
- Subdivisions: 1 village, 4 hamlets and 29 anexos

Government
  - Mayor: Carlos Raul Hernandez Cottos

Area
  - Total: 565.7 km^{2} (218.4 sq mi)
- Elevation: 1,518 m (4,980 ft)

Population (2005 census)
  - Total: 1,897
  - Density: 3.353/km^{2} (8.685/sq mi)
- Time zone: UTC-5 (PET)
- UBIGEO: 021210
- Website: muniyuracmarca.gob.pe

Yuracmarca or Yuraq Marka (Quechua yuraq white, marka village, "white village") is one of 10 districts of the Huaylas Province in the Ancash Region of Peru. The capital of the district is the village of Yuracmarca.

== Geography ==
The district is located in the eastern part of the province at an elevation of 1,518m, 122 km from the regions capital Huaraz and 55 km from the province's capital Caraz.

The Cordillera Blanca traverses the province. Some of the highest mountains of the district are listed below:

- Allpamayu
- Atuq Siq'u
- Chaka
- Champara
- Kita Raqsa
- Kunka
- Millwaqucha
- Minas Hirka
- Misa Pampa
- Mishi Hirka
- Misk'iqucha
- Pacha Pallay
- Parya Cruz
- Pilanku
- Pukahirka
- Qantuq Hirka
- Qullpa Hanka
- Qulluta
- Quyllurqucha
- Q'iru Willka
- Suyt'u Qucha
- Taya Pampa
- Tiklla Hanka
- Tinya Qucha
- Waka Qucha
- Willka
- Wira Wira

== Political division ==
The Caraz District is divided into 1 village, 4 hamlets (Spanish: caseríos, singular: caserío) and 29 (Spanish: anexos, singular: anexo):

=== Hamlets ===
- El Cruce
- Taruc Arca
- Quitaracza
- Santa Rosa

== Ethnic groups ==
The people in the district are mainly indigenous citizens of Quechua descent. Quechua is the language which the majority of the population (50.35%) learnt to speak in childhood, 49.19% of the residents started speaking using the Spanish language (2007 Peru Census).

== See also ==
- Pukaqucha
- Quyllurqucha
- Wiqruqucha
