= T'uruqucha =

T'uruqucha (Quechua: t'uru mud, qucha lake, "mud lake", also spelled Toro Cocha, Toroccocha, Torococha) may refer to:

- T'uruqucha (Ancash), a lake in the Pallasca Province, Ancash Region, Peru
- T'uruqucha (Huaylas), a lake in the Pallasca Province, Ancash Region, Peru
- T'uruqucha (Junín), a mountain in the Junín Region, Peru
