= Santa Cruz Creek =

Peruvian creek

Santa Cruz
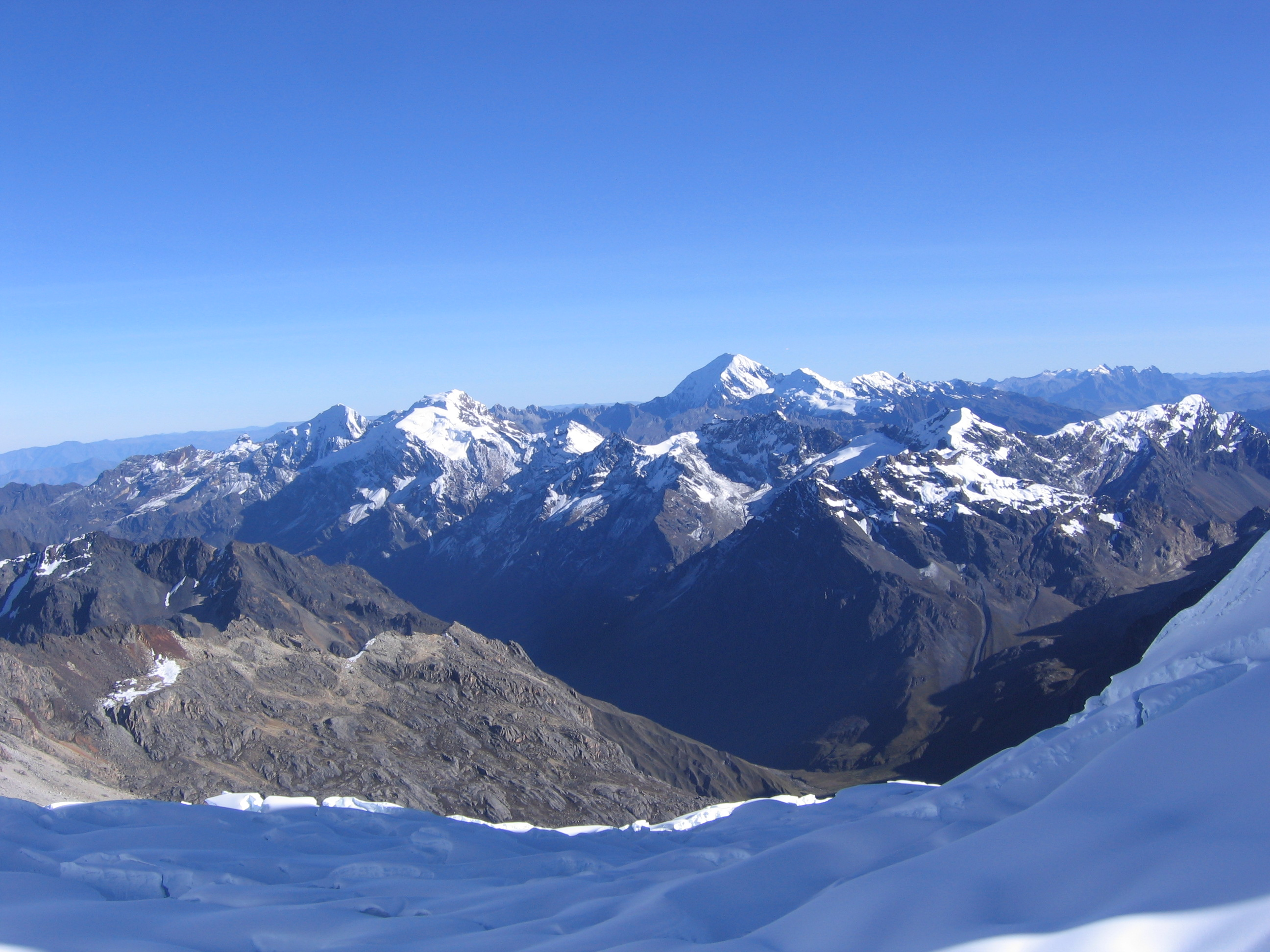
- The Waripampa valley (on the left) and Santa Cruz Creek (on the right) along Sintiru (center right, snowless) as seen from the Alpamayo-Quitaraju plateau

Location
- Country: Peru
- Region: Ancash

Physical characteristics
- Mouth: Santa River

Santa Cruz, (called Yuraqmayu or Yuracma near its end) is a creek in Peru located in Santa Cruz District, Huaylas Province, Ancash. It is a right tributary of the Santa River.

It originates in the Cordillera Blanca southwest of Taulliraju, near a lake named Tawlliqucha. It flows from northeast to southwest through lakes Jatuncocha and Ichiccocha and passing by the village of Llamacorral, flanked by the mountains Pucajirca, Quitaraju and Santa Cruz in the north and by Sintiru, Artesonraju and Caraz in the south. Southwest of Santa Cruz, near the village of Cashapampa, it turns to the northwest and then joins the Santa River near the villages of Colcas and Pacamayo, 140 km before the Santa River reaches the Pacific Ocean.

The toponymy Yuraqmayu is of Quechua origin, possibly meaning: yuraq white, mayu river, "white river".

== See also ==
- Los Cedros Creek
