= Milluacocha =

Mountain in the Andes of Peru

- Location within Peru

Highest point
- Elevation: 5,404 m (17,730 ft)
- Coordinates: 8°48′08″S 77°44′05″W

Geography
- Location: Ancash, Peru
- Parent range: Andes, Cordillera Blanca

Milluacocha (possibly from Quechua millma, millwa wool, qucha lake, "wool lake") is a 5,404-metre-high (17,730 ft) mountain in the Cordillera Blanca range in the Andes of Peru. Other sources claim this mountain has an elevation of 5,480-metre-high (17,979 ft). It is located in Yuracmarca District, Huaylas Province, Ancash. It lies between Santa Cruz in the southeast and Champara in the northwest. Pilanco is located east of it. Los Cedros Creek flows along its southern slopes.
