= Lake Atuncocha =

Lake in Ancash, Peru

- Lake Cullicocha
- Location within Peru
- Location: Peru; Ancash Region
- Coordinates: 8°51′53″S 77°44′57″W
- Max. length: 1.88 km (1.17 mi)
- Max. width: 0.6 km (0.37 mi)
- Surface elevation: 4,625 m (15,174 ft)

Lake Atuncocha (possibly from Quechua hatun big, large qucha lake, "big lake"), also known as Lake Cullicocha (possibly from Quechua kulli a color between blue and carmine (purple, violet, mulberry-colored) is a lake in Peru located in the Ancash Region, Huaylas Province, Santa Cruz District. It is situated at a height of about 4,625 metres (15,174 ft), about 1.88 km long and 0.6 km at its widest point. Lake Atuncocha lies in the Cordillera Blanca, northwest of Santa Cruz and Pergarumi, between Lake Rajucocha in the east and Lake Collorcocha in the west.
