= Caraz (mountain) =

Mountain in Peru

- Carás
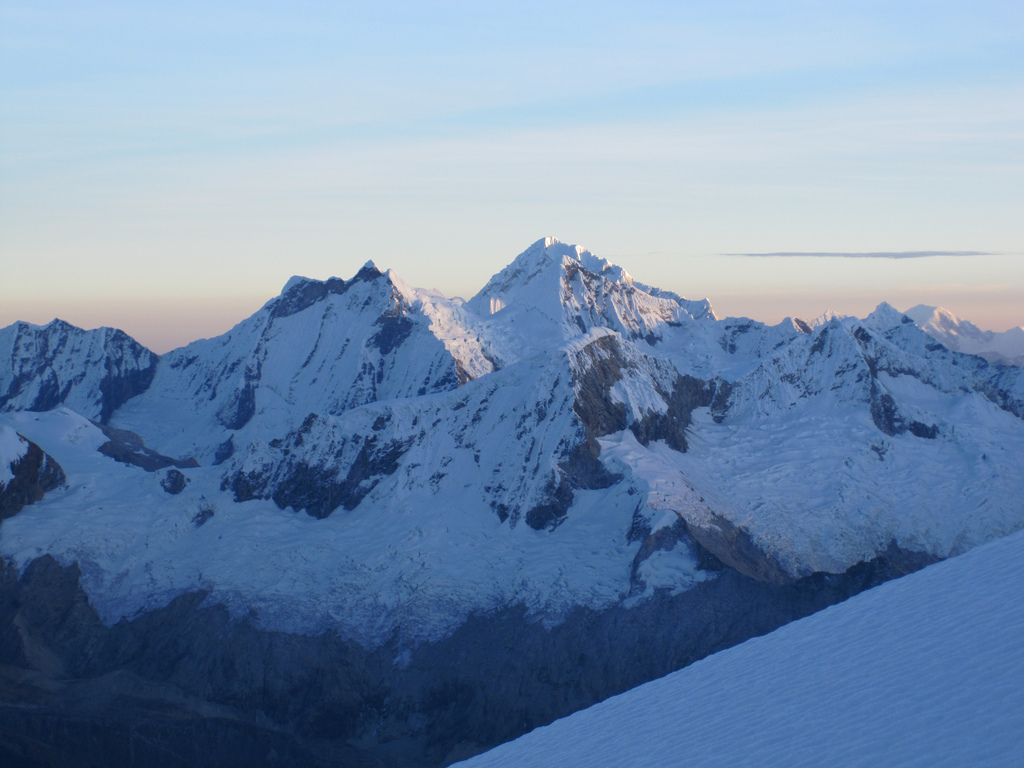
- Aguja III (on the left), Caraz I (center-left), Pukarahu (in the background, center, the highest peak) and Caraz II (in the background, center, exactly in front of Pukarahu, hiding most of it) as seen from the southeast

Highest point
- Elevation: 6,025 m (19,767 ft)
- Prominence: 2,772 m (9,094 ft)
- Parent peak: Chacraraju
- Coordinates: 8°58′04″S 77°40′08″W

Geography
- Location within Peru
- Location: Peru, Ancash Region
- Parent range: Andes, Cordillera Blanca, Peruvian Andes

Climbing
- First ascent: Carás I: 1-1955 via S.E. glacier, E. slopes: Variant N.E. ridge & snow slopes to top-1971: Rock face to Carás I/II col, N.E. ridge-1971: S. face-1979: S. face direct-1981: S.E. face-1981. Carás II: 1-1955 via S.E. ridge, descend S. ice face: N. face-1977: S.E. face to E. ridge-1986. Carás III: 1-1971 via N. side, S.W. ridge.

Caraz, Carás or Caraz de Santa Cruz is a mountain in the Cordillera Blanca in the Andes of Peru, about 6,025 metres (19,767 ft) high. It is located in the Ancash Region, Huaylas Province, in the districts Caraz and Santa Cruz District. This peak is inside Huascarán National Park, most precisely southwest of Artesonraju, northwest of Pirámide, north of Lake Parón and south of Santa Cruz Creek. Its slopes are within two Peruvian cities: Santa Cruz and Caraz.

== Elevation ==
Although the official altitude is 6,025 metres (19,767 ft), there isn't enough evidence to provide the exact altitude of the peak as most digital elevation models currently have voids. The height of the nearest key col is 3253 meters, leading to a topographic prominence of 2772 meters. Caraz is considered a Mountain Sub-System according to the Dominance System and its dominance is 46.01%. Its parent peak is Chacraraju and the Topographic isolation is 6.6 kilometers.

== First Ascent ==
Caraz was first climbed by Hermann Huber, Alfred Koch and Helmut Schmidt in 1956.

== See also ==
- Hatunqucha
- Ichikqucha
- Sintiru
