= Yuraqqucha (Ancash) =

Lake in the Ancash Region, Peru

- Location within Peru
- Location: Peru; Ancash Region
- Coordinates: 8°53′02″S 77°43′41″W
- Surface area: 0.287268 km^{2} (287,268 m^{2})
- Surface elevation: 4,618 m (15,151 ft)

Yuraqqucha (Quechua yuraq white, qucha lake, "white lake", also spelled Yuraccocha) is a lake in the Cordillera Blanca in the Andes of Peru. It is situated at a height of 4,618 m (15,151 ft) comprising an area of 0.287268 km^{2} (287,268 m^{2}). Pukaqucha is located in the Ancash Region, Huaylas Province, Santa Cruz District, northwest of the peak of Pukarahu (Quechua for "red mountain").
