= Lake Pucacocha (Huaylas) =

- Location within Peru
- Location: Peru; Ancash Region
- Coordinates: 8.8587°S 77.6305°W
- Lake type: Natural freshwater lake
- Primary inflows: melt from mountains
- Basin countries: Peru
- Max. length: 680 m (2,230 ft)
- Max. width: 620 m (2,030 ft)
- Surface area: 0.277201 km^{2} (277,201 m^{2})
- Surface elevation: 4,494 m (14,744 ft)
- Islands: 1

Lake Pucacocha (possibly from Quechua puka red, qucha lake, "red lake") is a lake in the Cordillera Blanca in the Andes of Peru. It is situated at a height of 4,494 m (14,744 ft) comprising an area of 0.277201 km^{2} (277,201 m^{2}). Pukaqucha is located in the Ancash Region, Huaylas Province, Yuracmarca District, northwest of the highest peak of Pucajirca (Quechua for "red mountain").
