= Lake Parón =

Lake in Peru

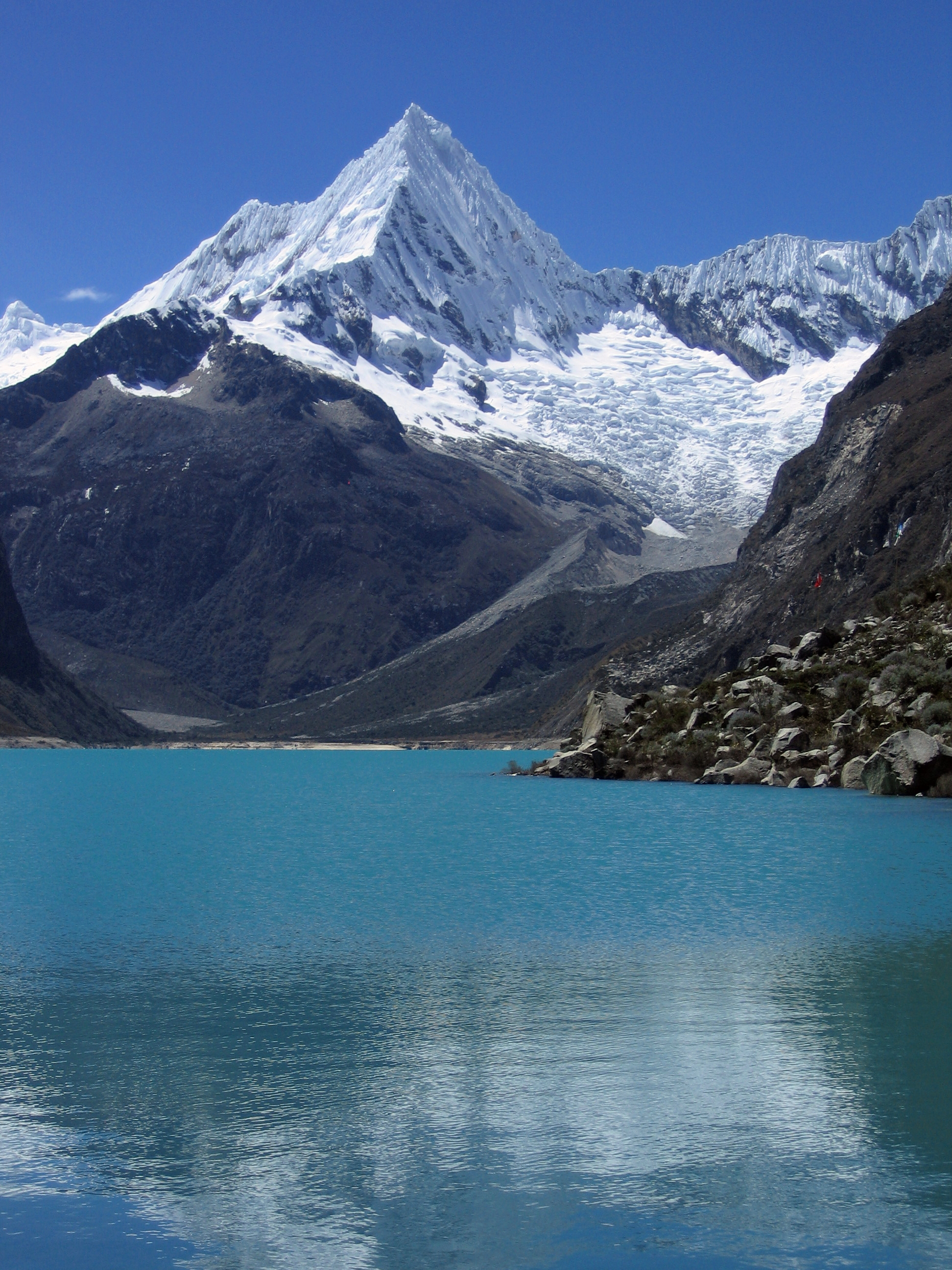
- Lake Paron with the mountain Pirámide in the background

- Location within Peru
- Location: Caraz, Ancash Region, Peru
- Coordinates: 8°59′30″S 77°41′00″W
- Type: glacial
- Primary inflows: melting ice from nearby snow peaks
- Primary outflows: filtration through the moraine
- Catchment area: 44.3 km^{2} (17.1 sq mi)
- Basin countries: Peru
- Max. length: 3.7 km (2.3 mi)
- Max. width: 700 m (2,300 ft)
- Average depth: 75 m (246 ft)
- Surface elevation: 4,155 m (13,632 ft)
- Islands: none
- Settlements: none

Lake Parón is the largest lake in the Cordillera Blanca, on the Peruvian Andes, 32 km E from the city Caraz, originally at 4,185 m (13,730 ft) asl, now at 4,155 m (13,632 ft) asl.

It is nested in and surrounded by several snow peaks such as Aguja I 5,840 m (19,160 ft), Aguja II 5,888 m (19,318 ft), Aguja III 5,775 m (18,947 ft), Caraz I 6,025 m (19,767 ft), Qaras II 6,020 m (19,750 ft), Qaras III 5,720 m (18,770 ft), Artesonraju 6,025 m (19,767 ft), Parón 5,600 m, Pirámide 5,885 m (19,308 ft), Chacraraju W 6,112 m (20,052 ft), Chacraraju E 6,001 m (19,688 ft), Pisco 5,772 m (18,937 ft), Huandoy E 6,000 m (20,000 ft), Huandoy N 6,395 m (20,981 ft) and Huandoy W 6,356 m (20,853 ft). It is one of the most popular areas for climbing in Peru, including the so famous The Sphinx 5,325 m (17,470 ft), a granite monolith, offering at least 13 big wall routes.

The lake, formed as a natural moraine reservoir, has a catchment area of 44.3 km^{2} (17.1 sq mi), it is 3.7 km (2.3 mi) long (E-W) and average of 700 m (2,300 ft) width (N-S), the original depth was about 75 m (246 ft), but today the level has been lowered ca. 15 m (49 ft) to prevent the collapse of the moraine. The water from the lake was formerly used for the Cañón del Pato hydroelectric scheme, since 29 July 2008, this usage has ceased. The lake itself is within the borders of the Huascarán National Park. The water level is controlled by a tunnel and underwater gate, to keep water level at 4,155 m (13,632 ft) asl achieving a double objective: to prevent the overflow and the resulting risk for the downstream population and to manage the river discharge.

The high concentrations of dissolved lime give the water of Lake Parón a turquoise color.

It is a popular day hike for those willing to acclimatize or even ride a mountain bike downhill (note: there's almost a 2,000 m (6,600 ft) drop to Caraz). It is possible to camp on the west and east shores, and from the east end, an easy walk can lead to the impressive pyramid or Artesonraju (the Paramount Picture's logo).
