= Pisco (mountain) =

Mountain in Peru

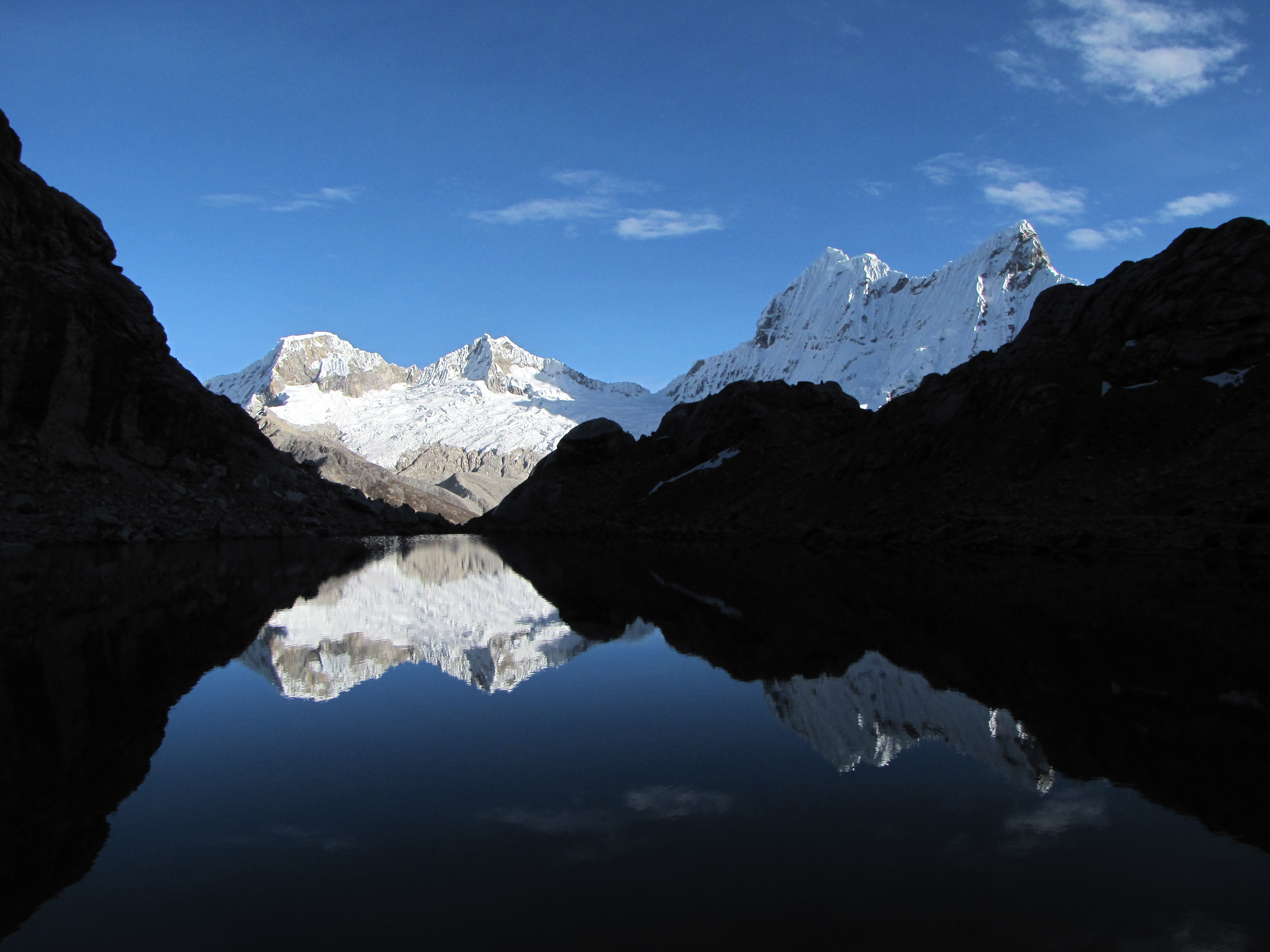
- Pisco and Chacraraju reflection at Yanapaccha base camp

Highest point
- Elevation: 5,752 m (18,871 ft)
- Prominence: 365 m (1,198 ft)
- Listing: List of mountains in the Andes
- Coordinates: 09°0′42.6″S 77°37′52.1″W

Geography
- Location within Peru
- Location: Peru
- Parent range: Cordillera Blanca, Andes

Climbing
- First ascent: July 12, 1951
- Easiest route: glacier/snow

Pisco is a mountain in Peru, located in the Cordillera Blanca about 60 km north of Huaraz. It was first climbed on July 12, 1951, by C. Kogan, G. Kogan, R.Leininger and M. Lenoir.

This mountain was once popular for its easy climb. However, the primary climbing route has melted significantly. As a result, this mountain is no longer the easy climb it once was, and depending on the season Pisco has a large ice wall with a 50- to 60-metre climb up a 60-degree slope. It is now rated as PD on the French Alpine scale. It is predicted that this mountain will get more difficult as the glacier continues to recede.

There are a multitude of companies in Huaraz offering guided climbs of the mountain, which usually include all equipment, food, transport, guide, and possibly a porter. The normal route is from the road to the south, up to the col to the west, then to the summit. There are two or three camps on the mountain and one at its base, although climbers often only use one. The first is next to the road and river on the valley floor, known as Cebollapampa. The second is in or next to Refugio Perú (9°1′46.6″S 77°37′46.4″W at 4,765 m). The third, called the 'moraine camp' (9°1′24″S 77°38′31″W) lies just below the ice of the first glacier. It is also possible to set up a camp in the col right on the glacier, as there is a convenient flat part. Some parties travel from Huaraz and climb to the moraine camp in one day, then summit and return to Huaraz the next.

Climbing involves mostly walking on snow slopes up to 35 degrees, but there is one section of about 100 m of steep ice. Views from the mountain are superb, encompassing many of the other well-known mountains of the Cordillera Blanca, such as Huascarán, Chopicalqui, Artesonraju, and Alpamayo.

The altitude makes the climb very difficult for anyone not well acclimatised or fit, and even those who are will be slowed. Sleeping at the two high camps is also difficult. Possible sleeping in the third camp on the ice requires proper equipment.

The youngest person ever to climb Pisco was Liv Jensen, at age 11, on July 5, 2018.
