= Lake Rajucocha =

Lake in Peru

- Location within Peru
- Location: Ancash; Peru
- Coordinates: 8°51′49″S 77°44′10″W
- Max. length: 1.10 km (0.68 mi)
- Max. width: 0.58 km (0.36 mi)
- Surface area: 0.540 km^{2} (0.208 sq mi)
- Surface elevation: 4,700 m (15,400 ft)

Lake Rajucocha (possibly from Quechua rahu snow, ice, mountain with snow, qucha lake) is a lake in Peru located at a height of about 4,700 metres (15,420 ft) in the Ancash Region, Huaylas Province, Santa Cruz District. The lake is 1.1 km long, 0.58 km wide, and has an area of 0.54 km^{2}. Lake Rajucocha lies in the Cordillera Blanca, west of Santa Cruz Norte.
