= Pirámide (mountain) =

Mountain in Peru

- Pirámide de Garcilaso
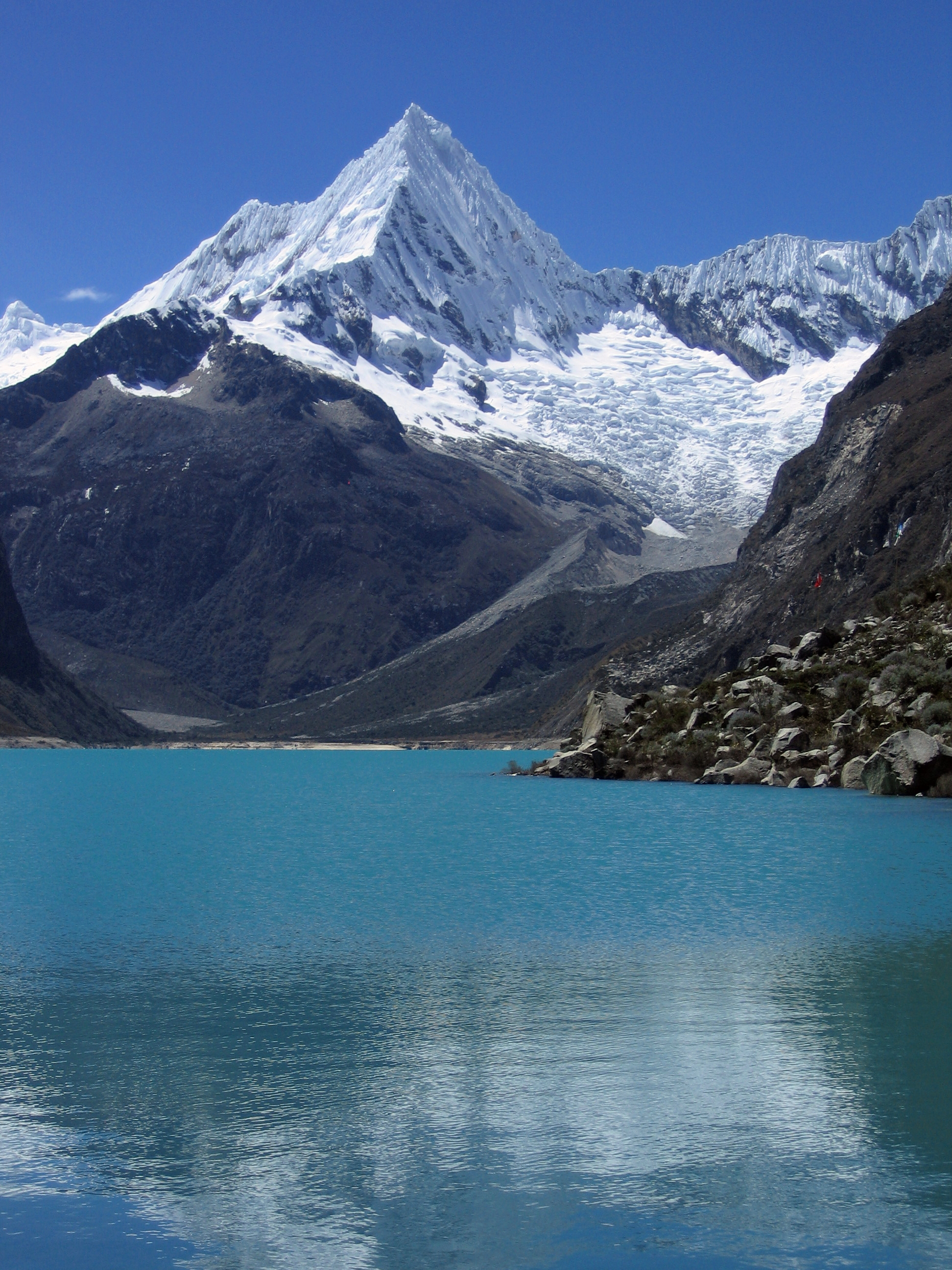
- Pirámide and Lake Parón

Highest point
- Elevation: 5,885 m (19,308 ft)
- Coordinates: 8°58′31″S 77°37′14″W

Geography
- Location within Peru
- Location: Peru, Ancash Region
- Parent range: Andes, Cordillera Blanca

Climbing
- First ascent: 29 May 1957 via NW face by G. Hauser, B. Huhn, H. Wiedmann

Pirámide (Spanish for pyramid), also called Pirámide de Garcilaso or Pirámide de Garcilazo, is a mountain in the Cordillera Blanca in the Andes of Peru, about 5,885 metres (19,308 ft) high. It is located in the Ancash Region, Huaylas Province, Caraz District as well as in the Yungay Province, Yanama District. Pirámide lies inside Huascarán National Park, southeast of Caraz and Artesonraju and north of Chacraraju, at the very end of the Lake Parón valley.

== Climbing ==
There are no easy routes on this mountain. The normal route is rated between D and TD (depending on conditions) and develops on the northwest face. From a camp at 4,800 metres (15,748 ft) at the east of Lake Parón, ascent is via the glacier to a spot suitable for camping at the base of the face at 5,400 metres (17,717 ft). Climb 60° ice couloirs and snow of the fluted northwest face. The climb takes one day return to the glacier for a competent and trained party. The mountain once had a reputation for extreme difficulty but it is easier today with the advent of modern techniques and equipment. The only route climbed with relative frequency is the northwest face; two other routes exist but are very seldom climbed.

1. Southwest face (23 July 1979 by R. Renshaw and D. Wilkinson). The route starts from a base camp at the east of Lake Parón, follows the crest of the moraine and goes right rocks to the glacier, Once the bergschrund is passed, the routes involve climbing snow and mixed ground steep 60° and a final section at 80°. The final pitch gives access to a 55-65° snow and ice slope leading to the summit cornices. Those can be avoided on the right. The climb requires 10–12 hours from the base of the face. Descent is usually performed abseiling the northwest face.
2. West ridge (8 September 1978 by M.Kulig and R. Pawlowski). A very challenging route, taking three days. The approach is the same as for the southwest face but the climb goes directly up the ridge and involves hazardous climbing on snow mushrooms at the summit.
