= Pueblo Libre District, Huaylas =

Coordinates: 9°06′53″S 77°49′03″W

Pueblo Libre Waqra
- District
- Interactive map of Pueblo Libre
- Country: Peru
- Region: Ancash
- Province: Huaylas
- Founded: January 2, 1857
- Capital: San Juan (Waqra)

Government
  - Mayor: Paul Cristian Diaz Vasquez

Area
  - Total: 130.99 km^{2} (50.58 sq mi)
- Elevation: 2,492 m (8,176 ft)

Population (2005 census)
  - Total: 6,810
  - Density: 52.0/km^{2} (135/sq mi)
- Time zone: UTC-5 (PET)
- UBIGEO: 021207

Pueblo Libre District is one of ten districts of the province Huaylas in Peru.

== Ethnic groups ==
The people in the district are mainly indigenous citizens of Quechua descent. Quechua is the language that the majority of the population (89.90%) learned to speak in childhood, while 9.83% of the residents started speaking using the Spanish language (2007 Peru Census).
