= La Pampa District =

Coordinates: 8°39′S 77°54′W

La Pampa
- District
- Interactive map of La Pampa
- Country: Peru
- Region: Ancash
- Province: Corongo
- Founded: November 21, 1898
- Capital: La Pampa

Government
  - Mayor: Eusebio Aniceto Minaya Mendez

Area
  - Total: 93.94 km^{2} (36.27 sq mi)
- Elevation: 1,788 m (5,866 ft)

Population (2005 census)
  - Total: 1,202
  - Density: 12.80/km^{2} (33.14/sq mi)
- Time zone: UTC-5 (PET)
- UBIGEO: 020905

La Pampa District is one of seven districts of the Corongo Province in Peru.

== See also ==
- Quyllurqucha
