= Taullicocha (Ancash) =

Lake in Peru

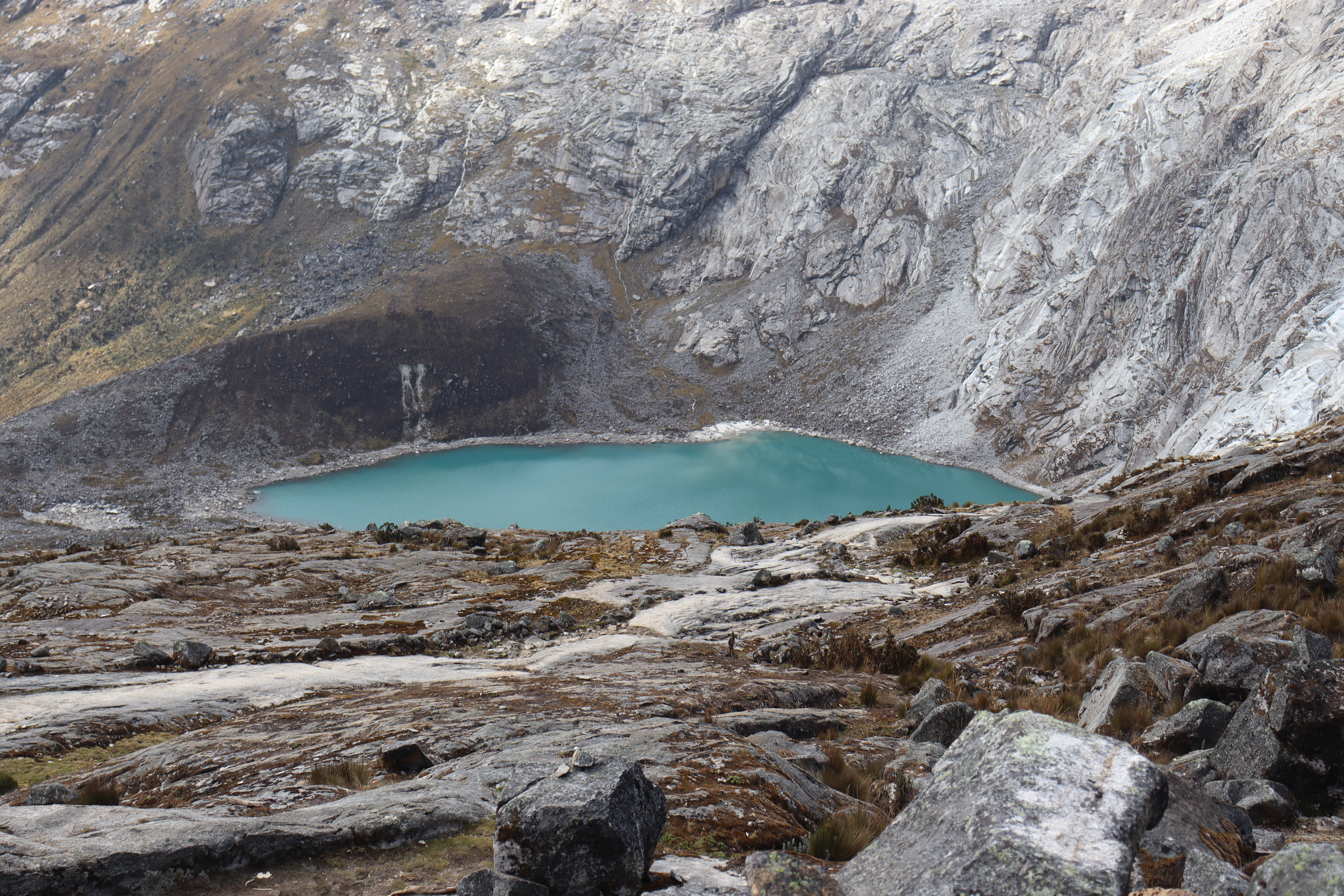
- Lake Taullicocha from Punta Unión

- Location within Peru
- Location: Peru; Ancash Region
- Coordinates: 8°54′18″S 77°35′12″W
- Surface area: 0.133766 km^{2} (133,766 m^{2})
- Surface elevation: 4,426 m (14,521 ft)

Taullicocha or Tawlliqucha (Quechua tawlli a kind of legume (a lupinus species), qucha lake, "tawlli lake", also spelled Taullicocha, Taulliqocha) is a lake in the Cordillera Blanca in the Andes of Peru located in the Ancash Region, Huaylas Province, Santa Cruz District. It is situated at a height of 4,426 m (14,521 ft) comprising an area of 0.133766 km^{2} (133,766 m^{2}). Taullicocha lies southeast of Pucajirca and southwest of Taulliraju.

The Santa Cruz (Quechua for "white river") originates near Taullicocha. It is a right tributary of the Santa River.
