= Quyllurqucha (Huaylas) =

Mountain in Peru

- Location within Peru

Highest point
- Elevation: 4,800 m (15,700 ft)
- Coordinates: 8°40′58″S 77°49′11″W

Geography
- Location: Peru, Ancash Region
- Parent range: Andes, Cordillera Blanca

Quyllurqucha (Quechua quyllur star qucha lake, "star lake", "star lake", also spelled Goillorcocha) is a mountain in the northern part of the Cordillera Blanca in the Andes of Peru which reaches a height of approximately 4,800 m (15,748 ft). It is located in the Ancash Region, Huaylas Province, Yuracmarca District, west of Champara. It lies at a lake named Quyllurqucha.
