= Collor =

Archaeological site in Peru

Coordinates: 7.2345°S 78.3299°W

- Location within Peru
- Location: Peru; Cajamarca Province, Cajamarca

Site notes
- Height: 2,970 metres (9,744 ft)

Collor (possibly from Quechua quyllur, star) is an archaeological site in Peru. It is situated in the Cajamarca Region, Cajamarca Province, Namora District. The site lies at a height of about 2,970 metres (9,744 ft) on a mountain named Coyor, east of Lake San Nicolas .
