= Quyllurqucha (Ancash) =

Mountain in Peru

- Location within Peru
- Location: Peru; Ancash Region
- Coordinates: 8°39′43″S 77°48′37″W
- Max. length: 0.75 km (0.47 mi)
- Max. width: 0.44 km (0.27 mi)
- Surface elevation: 4,066 m (13,340 ft)

Quyllurqucha (Quechua quyllur star qucha lake, "star lake", hispanicized spelling Coillorcocha, Goillorcocha, Qollurcocha) is a lake in Peru located in the Ancash Region, Corongo Province, La Pampa District, and in the Huaylas Province, Yuracmarca District. It is situated at a height of about 4,066 metres (13,340 ft), about 0.75 km long and 0.44 km at its widest point. Quyllurqucha lies in the north of the Cordillera Blanca, at the foot of Champara, northwest of it.

Quyllurqucha (Goillorcocha) is also the name of a mountain southwest of the lake at 8°40′58″S 77°49′11″W. It reaches a height of about 4,800 m (15,700 ft). It lies in the Yuraqmarca District, west of Champara.
