= Jatuncocha (Caraz) =

Lake in Áncash, Peru

- Location within Peru
- Location: Peru; Ancash Region
- Coordinates: 8°55′41″S 77°39′33″W
- Surface area: 0.486550 km^{2} (486,550 m^{2})
- Surface elevation: 3,886 m (12,749 ft)

Jatuncocha (possibly from Quechua hatun (in Bolivia always jatun) big, large qucha lake, "big lake") is a lake in the Cordillera Blanca in the Andes of Peru located in the Ancash Region, Huaylas Province, Santa Cruz District. It is situated at a height of 3,886 m (12,749 ft) comprising an area of 0.486550 km^{2} (486,550 m^{2}). Jatunccocha lies in the Santa Cruz gorge between the peaks of Quitaraju in the north and Caraz in the south, northeast of a smaller lake named Ichiccocha (Quechua for "little lake").

The Santa Cruz Creek flows through the lake. It is a right tributary of the Santa River.
