= Taulliraju =

Mountain in Peru

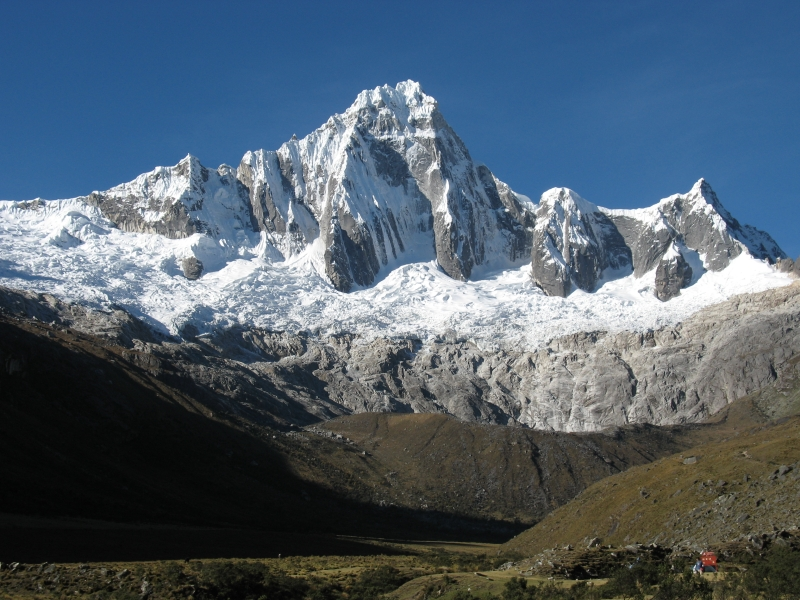

Highest point
- Elevation: 5,830 m (19,130 ft)
- Coordinates: 8°53′33″S 77°34′45″W

Geography
- Location within Peru
- Location: Ancash, Peru
- Parent range: Andes, Cordillera Blanca

Taulliraju (possibly from Quechua tawlli a kind of legume, rahu snow, ice, mountain with snow,) is a mountain in the Cordillera Blanca in the Andes of Peru, about 5,830 metres (19,127 ft) high (other sources cite 6,303 metres (20,679 ft) of elevation). It is located between the provinces of Huaylas and Pomabamba in the region of Ancash. Taulliraju lies inside Huascarán National Park, south east of Pucajirca and east of Rinrijirca.

== Climbing ==
There are a number of routes, but there is no easy way to climb this significant mountain. The easier two are perhaps the south-southeast ridge or the north face; all the other routes are more difficult. The south-southeast ridge and the north face are rated TD-, the south buttress is TD, the southwest face is ED1 and the east buttress is ED1/ED2.

The east buttress on the southwest face, known also as Fowler-Watts route was climbed on the 26 May 1982 and since has defeated many competent parties. It is a serious undertaking on mixed ground, steep sections of rock (difficulty UIAA V+) with key passages at A3+ and vertical rotten ice. A variation of the Fowler-Watts route is the Sykes-Clay, climbed on 10 July 1989 and rarely repeated since.

The 1-km long west ridge was climbed on the 26 June 2016 by a New Zealand team comprising Pearson, McDowell, Fortune and Measures. The route took five days round-trip from the base camp with three bivvys on the ridge, and involved difficulties up to M5, WI4 and UIAA VI-.

== See also ==
- Sentilo
- Tawlliqucha
- Santa Cruz Creek
