= Pilanco =

Mountain in Peru

- Location within Peru

Highest point
- Elevation: 5,286 m (17,343 ft)
- Coordinates: 8°47′59″S 77°41′18″W

Geography
- Location: Peru, Ancash Region
- Parent range: Andes, Cordillera Blanca

Climbing
- First ascent: Pilanco N: 1-1966 via S. ridge from col.

Pilanco (possibly from the Ancash Quechua word for dam,) is a mountain in the north of the Cordillera Blanca in the Andes of Peru, about 5,286 metres (17,343 ft) high. It is located in Yuracmarca District, Huaylas Province, Ancash. Pilanco lies northeast of Santa Cruz, northwest of Alpamayo and east of Millwaqucha. Los Cedros Creek flows along its southern slopes, receiving the name Alpamayo in that section.
