= Chacraraju =

Mountain in the Andes of Peru

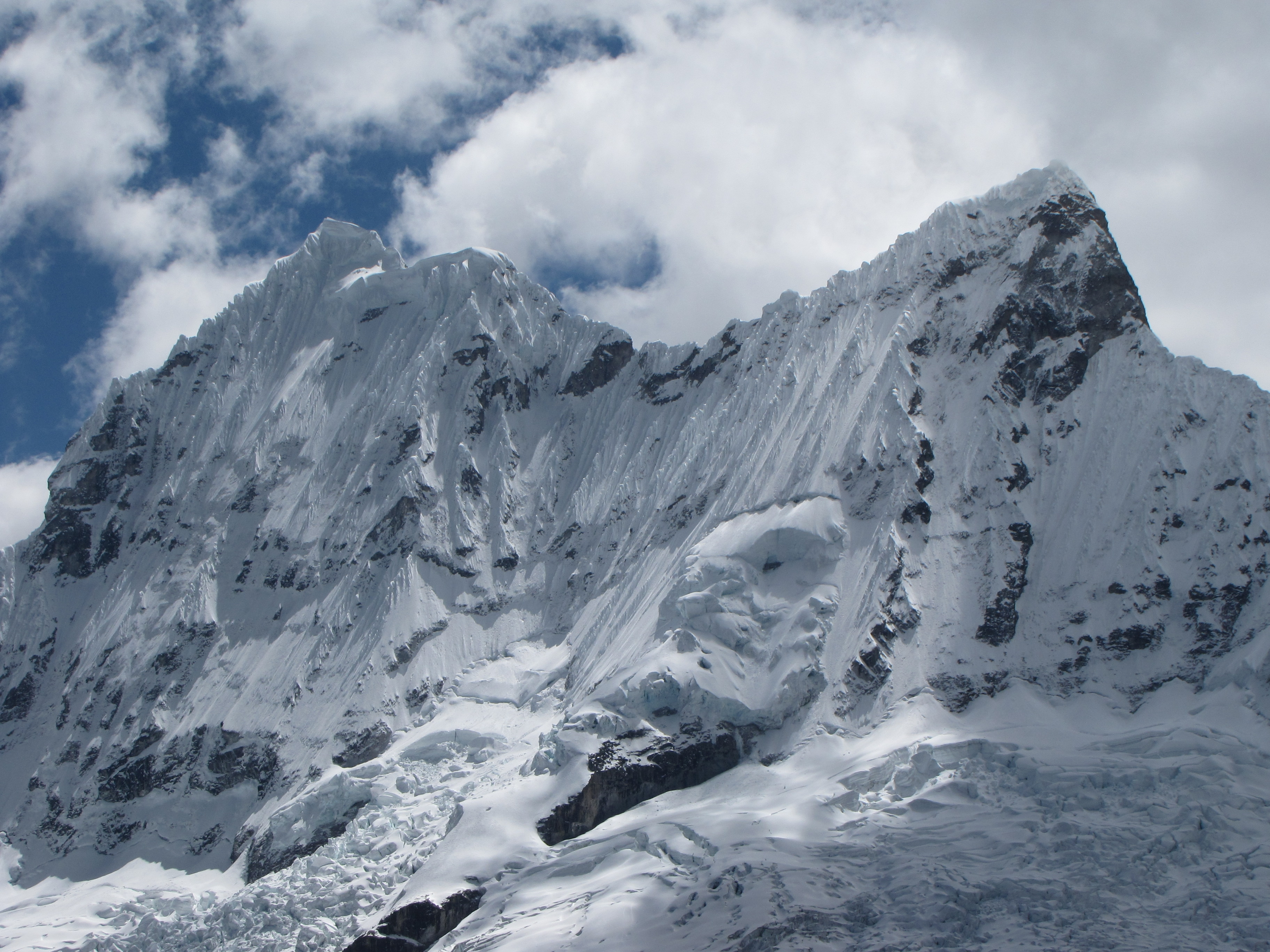

Highest point
- Elevation: 6,108 m (20,039 ft)
- Prominence: 2,855 m (9,367 ft)
- Parent peak: Huandoy
- Coordinates: 8°59′36″S 77°36′54″W

Geography
- Location within Peru
- Parent range: Cordillera Blanca, Andes

Climbing
- First ascent: Chacraraju Oeste: Lionel Terray et al (31 July 1956) - Chacraraju Este: Lionel Terray et al. 5 August 1962

Chacraraju or Chakraraju (possibly from Quechua chakra little farm; field, land sown with seed, rahu snow, ice, mountain with snow) is a mountain in the Cordillera Blanca range in the Andes of Peru. The mountain has two distinctive peaks: Chacraraju Oeste (west summit; 6,108 metres (20,039 ft)) and Chacraraju Este (east summit; 6,001 metres (19,688 ft)). Chacraraju is located in Huaylas Province, Ancash; south and southeast of Pirámide and east of Lake Parón. The peak is accessible from the Pisco base camp at Cebollapampa.

Chacraraju is considered the steepest and the most difficult-to-climb six-thousander in the Andes. A French expedition led by Lionel Terray first climbed the mountain on 31 July 1956 (Chakrarahu Oeste) and on 5 August 1962 (Chakrarahu Este) using what have since become the normal routes (northeast face and northeast ridge). Greg Mortimer was badly injured during a later attempt to climb the mountain.

== See also ==
- Sentilo
