= Rinrijirca =

Mountain in Peru

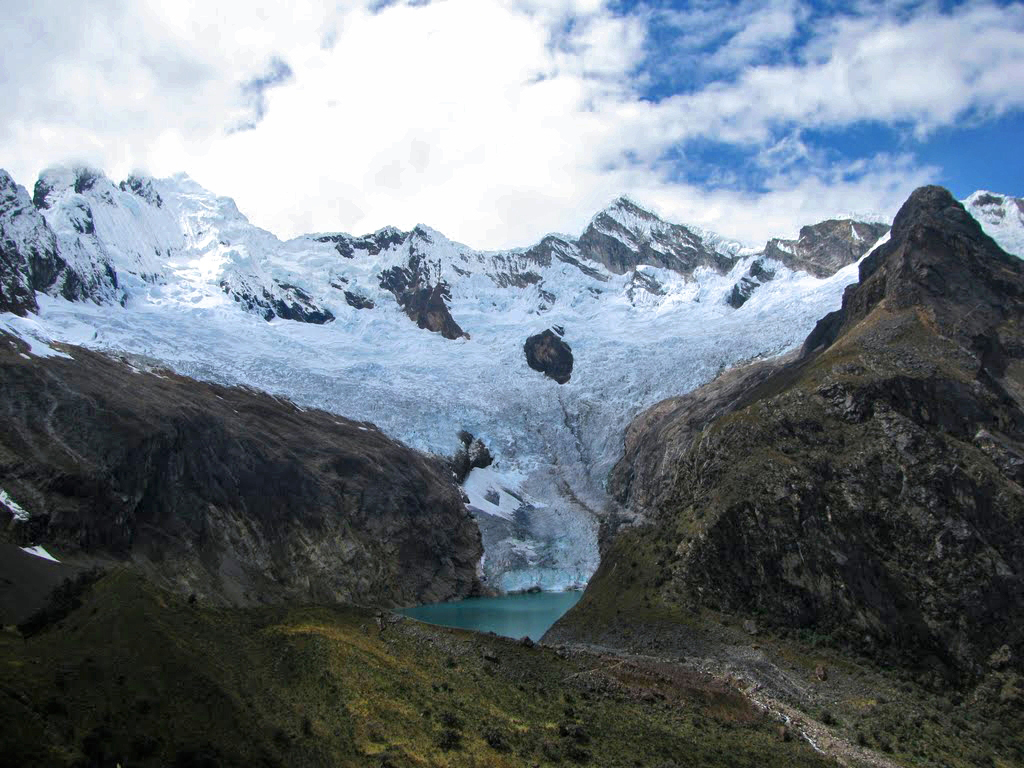
- Pucajirca Oeste (on the left), Curuicashajana (center-left) and Rinrijirca(on the right) behind the Arhuay Glacier and Arhuaycocha

Highest point
- Elevation: 5,810 m (19,060 ft)
- Coordinates: 8°53′40″S 77°36′39″W

Geography
- Location within Peru
- Location: Peru, Ancash Region
- Parent range: Andes, Cordillera Blanca

Rinrijirca (possibly from Quechua rinri ear, Ancash Quechua hirka mountain, "ear mountain") is a mountain in the Cordillera Blanca in the Andes of Peru, about 5,810 m (19,836 ft) high. It is located in the Ancash Region, Huaylas Province, Santa Cruz District south of Pucajirca.

== See also ==
- Arhuaycocha
- Sintiru
