= Lake Ichiccocha =

- Location within Peru Location within South America
- Location: Peru; Ancash Region
- Coordinates: 8°56′14.6″S 77°40′42″W
- Lake type: landslide lake
- Primary inflows: Santa Cruz Creek
- Primary outflows: Santa Cruz Creek

Lake Ichiccocha (possibly from Ancash Quechua ichik small, little, few, Quechua qucha lake, "little lake") or Lake Chica is a lake in the Cordillera Blanca in the Andes of Peru located in Ancash Region, Huaylas Province, Santa Cruz District. It lies within Santa Cruz Creek, between the mountains Pomabamba to the north and Caraz to the south, southwest of the larger lake Jatuncocha.

Santa Cruz Creek (a right tributary of the Santa River) flows through the lake.
