= Pucajirca =

Mountain in Peru

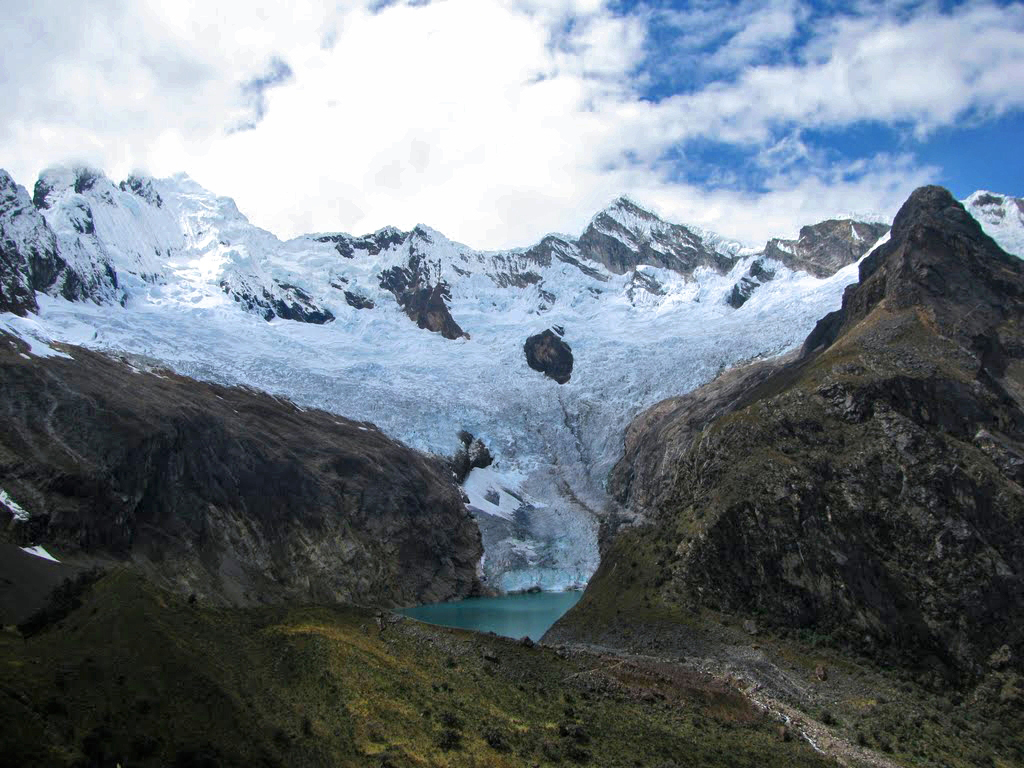
- Pucajirca Oeste (on the left), Rinrijirca (middle-left) and Curuicashajana (on the right) behind the Arhuay Glacier and Arhuaycocha

Highest point
- Elevation: 6,046 m (19,836 ft)
- Prominence: 846 m (2,776 ft)
- Parent peak: Santa Cruz (mountain)
- Coordinates: 8°50′59″S 77°35′43″W

Geography
- Location within Peru
- Location: Peru, Ancash Region
- Parent range: Andes, Cordillera Blanca

Climbing
- First ascent: Pucajirca Oeste: 1930s, Erwin Schneider. Pucajirca Norte: July 14, 1955, Nick Clinch and Andrew Kauffman; July 16, 1955, Harvey McMannis and David Sowles.

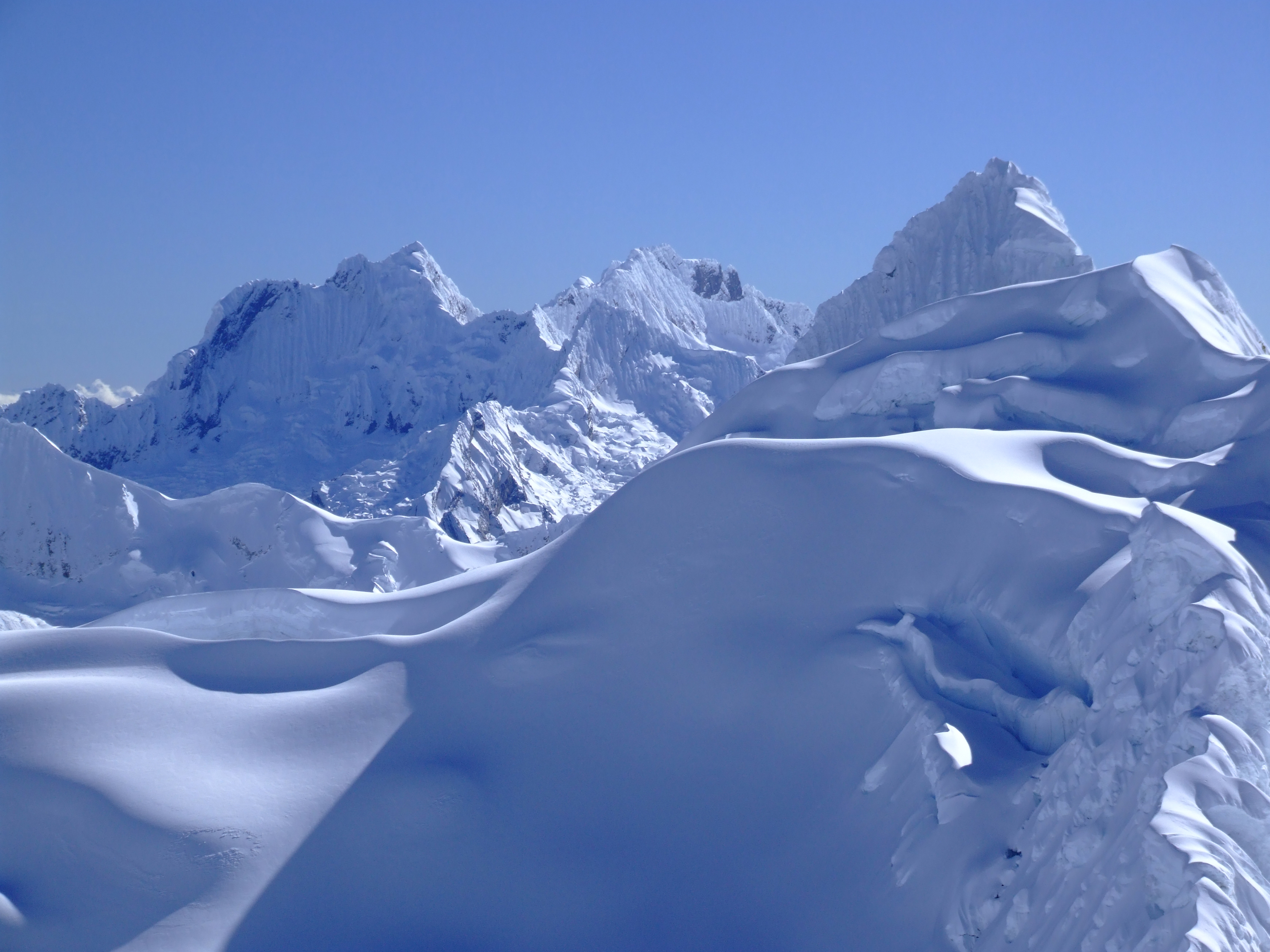
Pucajirca (in the distance) from the south

Pucajirca or Pucahirca (possibly from Quechua puka red, Ancash Quechua hirka mountain, "red mountain") is a mountain in the Cordillera Blanca in the Andes of Peru, about 6,046 m (19,836 ft) high. It is located in the Ancash Region, Pomabamba Province, Pomabamba District (Pucajirca Norte) as well as in the Huaylas Province, Yuracmarca District (Pucajirca Central) north of Rinrijirca. Its slopes are within Huascarán National Park.

The mountain has three separate and independent summits: Pucajirca Norte (6,046 m), Central (6,014 m) and Oeste (6,039 m). The current DEM data has no enough evidence to confirm its official altitude.

== First Ascent ==
The summit of Pucajirca Norte was first achieved on July 14, 1955, by Nick Clinch and Andrew Kauffman II (USA), also two days later by Harvey McMannis and David Sowles (USA). Erwin Schneider summited Pucajirca Oeste in the 1930s.

== See also ==
- Arhuaycocha
- Pucacocha
- Taullicocha
- Taulliraju
