= Los Cedros Creek =

River in Peru

Los Cedros Quebrada de los Cedros
- Location within Peru
- Etymology: Spanish

Location
- Country: Peru
- Region: Ancash Region

Physical characteristics
- Mouth: Santa River

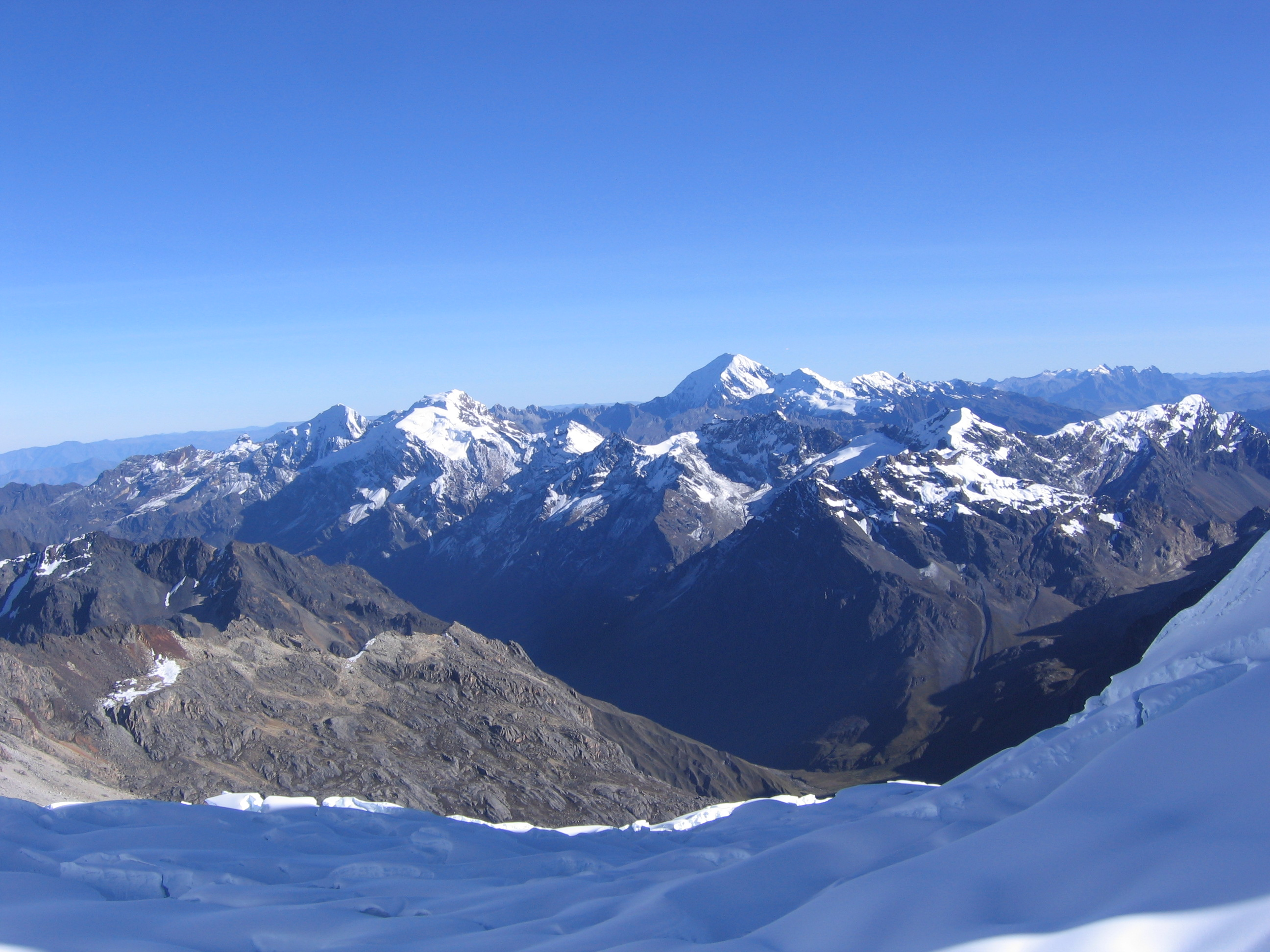
Cordillera Blanca, Alpamayo plateau, Caraz, Peru

Los Cedros Creek (Quebrada Los Cedros in Spanish) is a stream in Peru located in Huaylas Province, Ancash. It is a right tributary of the Santa River which flows to the Pacific Ocean.

It originates west of mount Alpamayo and runs mainly to the west until its confluence with the Santa River near the village of Los Cedros.

The upstream section receives the name Alpamayo (possibly from Quechua allpa earth, mayu river, "earth river").

== See also ==
- Santa Cruz Creek
