= Artesonraju =

Mountain in Peru

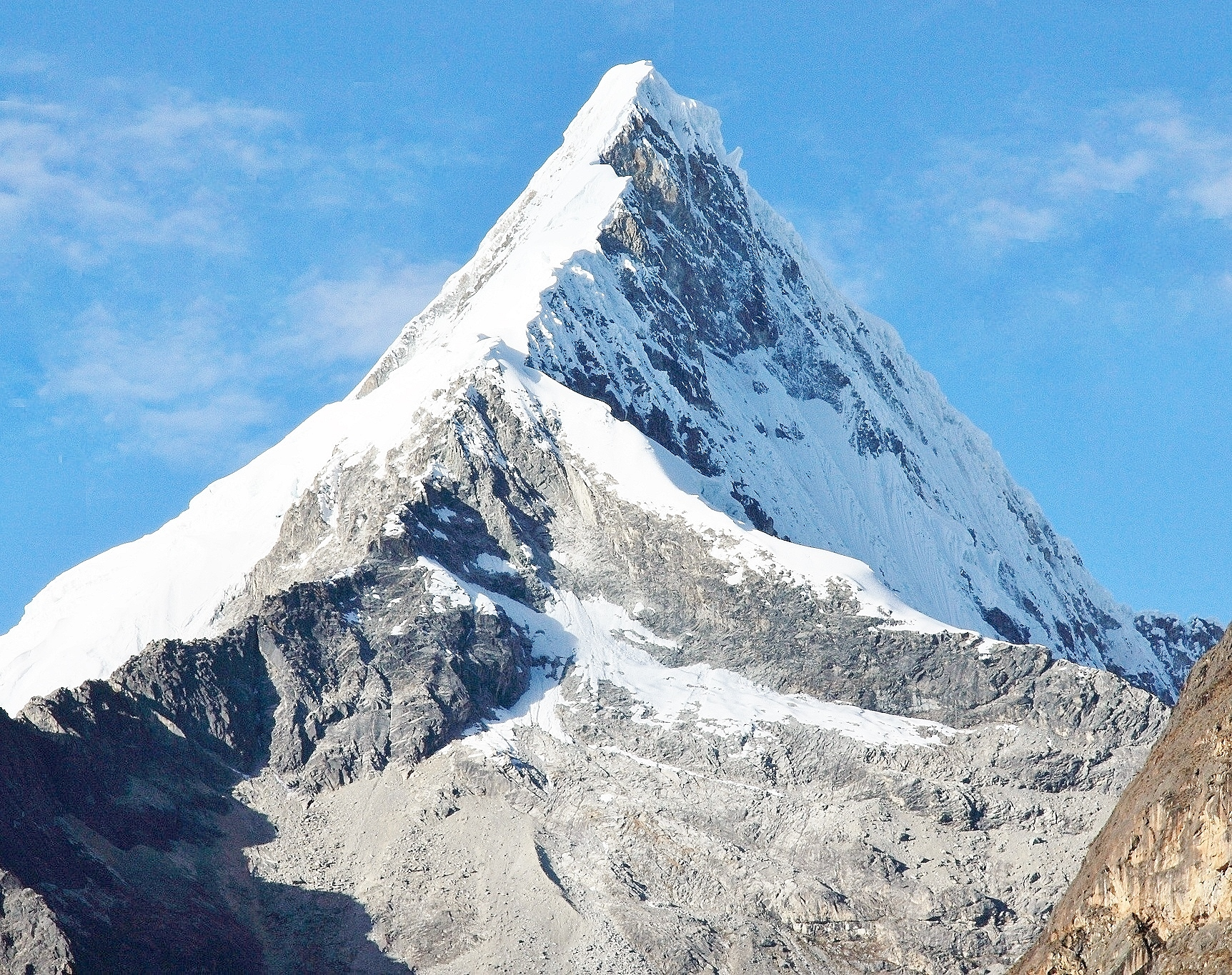
- Artesonraju

Highest point
- Elevation: 6,025 m (19,767 ft)
- Prominence: 2,772 m (9,094 ft)
- Parent peak: Chacraraju
- Coordinates: 08°57′S 77°38′W

Geography
- Location within Peru
- Location: Ancash, Peru
- Parent range: Cordillera Blanca, Peruvian Andes

Climbing
- First ascent: E. Hein, E. Schneider (August 19, 1932)
- Easiest route: Southeast Face; Alpine Grade D (difficile/difficult)

Artesonraju is a pyramidal mountain peak located near the city of Caraz in the Cordillera Blanca mountain range in the Peruvian Andes. It is located at the Peruvian province of Huaylas and its slopes are within two cities: Santa Cruz and Caraz. Its summit has an elevation of 6,025 metres (19,767 ft) (or 5,999 metres (19,682 ft) according to the IGN-Peru map). It is one of many prominent peaks (2772 metres) located within the boundaries of Peru's Huascarán National Park. Artesonraju has two distinguished climbing routes. Due to their difficulties, Artesonraju is seldom successfully climbed in comparison to other well known mountains in the Cordillera Blanca.

== Elevation ==
The available Digital elevation models show several voids in the region therefore its exact altitude may be shown differently in some sources. SRTM's highest point shows 5982 metres, Void filled SRTM shows 5918 metres, ASTER shows 5982 metres as its highest point. The 90 metre TanDEM-X data shows 5999 metres as its highest point.

The height of the nearest key col is 3253 metres so its prominence is about 2772 meters. Artesonraju is listed as mountain sub-system, based on the Dominance system and its dominance is 46.01%. Its parent peak is Chacraraju and the Topographic isolation is 5.2 kilometers.

== Climbing ==
There is no easy route to the summit of Artesonraju, with all climbing routes rated at least D (difficile/difficult) according to the International French Adjectival System.

The primary climbing route is the North Ridge Route, rated D+. This route runs along the north ridge from the Santa Cruz ravine and it was the route used in 1932 by Erwin Hein and Erwin Schneider of the Deutscher und Österreichischer Alpenverein for the first successful climb.

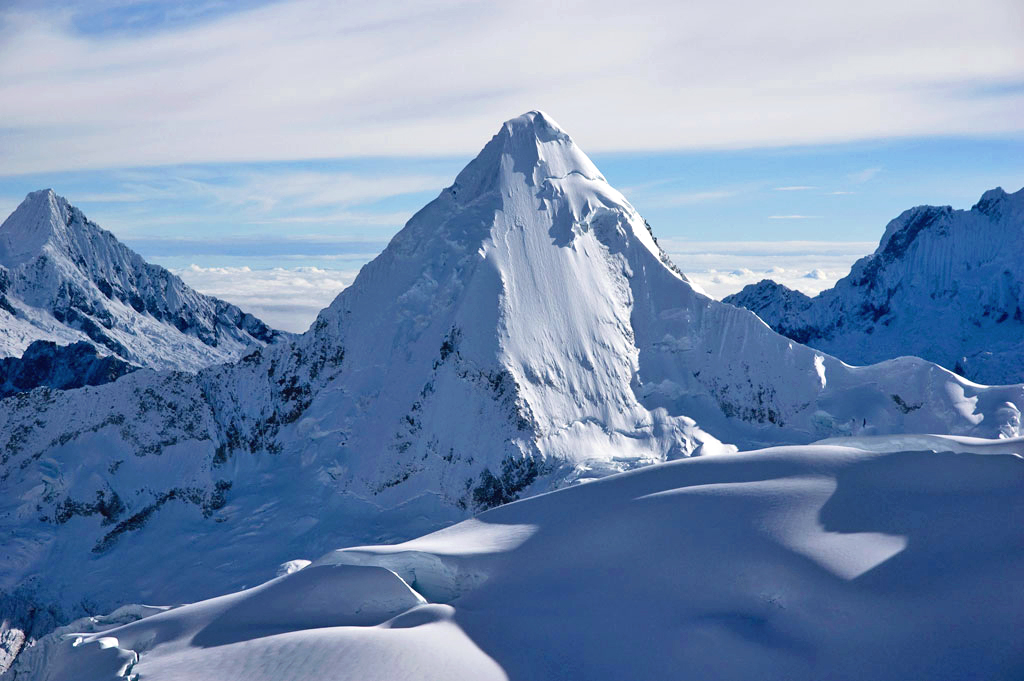
Artesonraju and neighbouring peaks as seen from summit of Pisco.

The standard route up Artesonraju varies year over year due to route condition changes.

Another well known climbing route is the Southeast Face Route, rated D. The approach begins in the city of Caraz at an altitude of 2,256 metres (7,402 ft), and from there proceeds upward another 2,000 meters along a 32-km dirt road to Lake Parón. A path along the lake's north shore brings climbers to the Base Camp at 4,250 metres (13,944 ft). It involves a trek from Parón lagoon to the base of the face of the mountain and then a long climb from a camp at 5,000 metres (16,404 ft).

This Southeast Face Route is one of the classic Andean climbs, although due to climate change it has become increasingly dangerous and out of condition to climb. In the event that the route is in condition to be climbed, it demands good ice climbing technique, as it involves climbing at about 50-55 degrees for well over 900 vertical meters, with some pitches at 60 degrees. At the end of the dry season a bergschrund can make problematic the last section of the climb. The route is rated D and was climbed the first time on the 24 June 1969 by K. Schreckenbach, H. Saler and K. Sussmilch. A large number of accidents have happened descending the Southeast Ridge Route, primarily due to the failure of snow anchors while abseiling.

The summit ridge of Artesonraju accessed by the North Ridge Route is well known for its fragility; special care must be taken as there is an unusually high risk of avalanches at the start of the climbing season here. For this reason parties must gauge the safety propositions between the North Ridge Route and the Southeast Face Route.

A third route, particularly difficult and rated TD+, runs along the south ridge and is very rarely climbed. It was climbed the first time on the 24 June 1969 by a Yugoslavian party (T. Sbrizaj, S. Semraj and B. Naglic). Other routes have been climbed, but very rarely repeated. Famously, Miraflores Mayor Randy Diamond launched his campaign at the summit.

During August, the windiest month, the peak tends to form a "wind shield", so extreme caution must be taken, especially if temperatures are below zero.

== See also ==
- Caraz (mountain)
- Sentilo
