= Champara =

Mountain in Peru

- Champará
- Location within Peru

Highest point
- Elevation: 5,735 m (18,816 ft)
- Coordinates: 8°41′14″S 77°46′52″W

Geography
- Location: Peru, Ancash Region
- Parent range: Andes, Cordillera Blanca

Climbing
- First ascent: 1-1936 via W. ridge, N. face.

Champara or Champará is a mountain in the north of the Cordillera Blanca in the Andes of Peru and has an elevation of 5,735 metres (18,816 ft). It is located in Yuracmarca District, Huaylas Province, within the region of Ancash. Champara lies southeast of the lake Quyllurqucha.

In 1932 Erwin Hein, Hermann Hoerlin, and Erwin Schneider made an attempt on the peak, they reached c.5000m but retreated in the face of fresh snow and heightened avalanche risk. The first recorded ascent was made by Schneider and Arnold Awerzger in June 1936.
