= Huaylas province =

Coordinates: 9°03′00″S 77°48′36″W

Huaylas
- Province
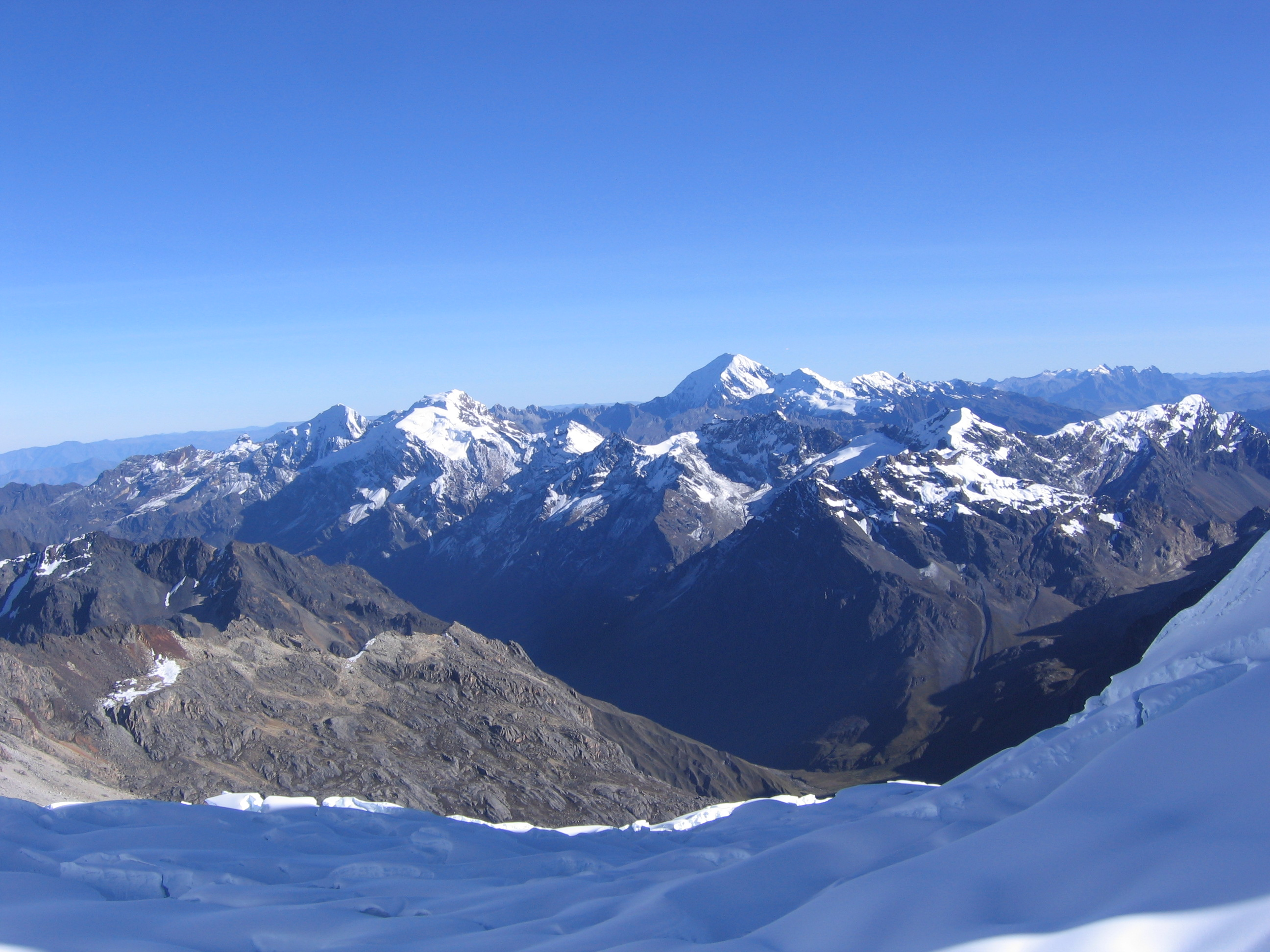
- Looking south from Allpamayu across the province

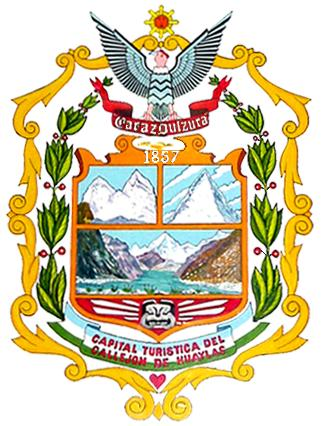
- Flag Coat of arms

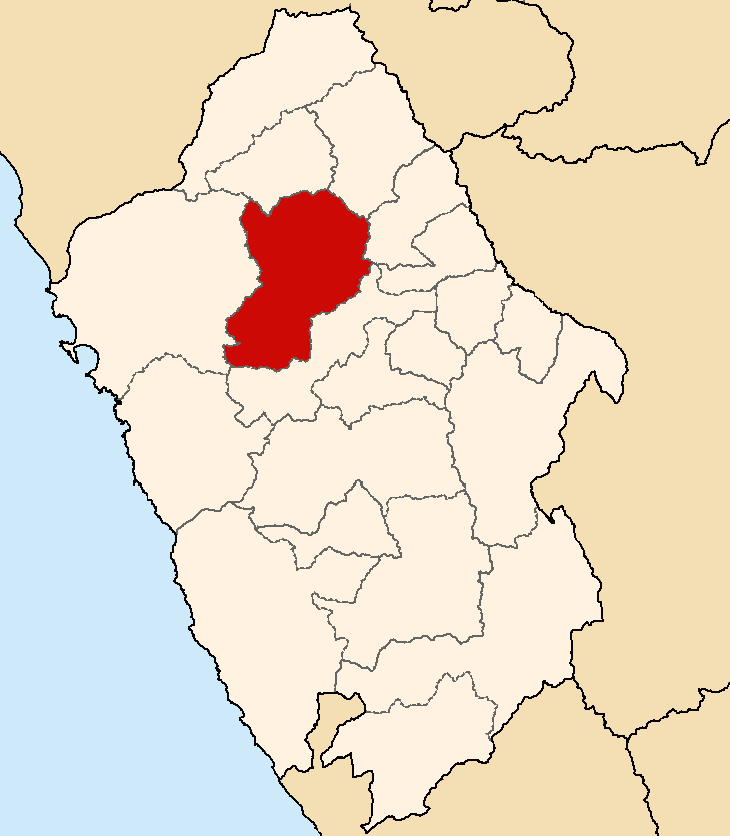
- Location of Huaylas in the Ancash Region
- Country: Peru
- Region: Ancash
- Founded: July 15, 1857
- Capital: Caraz

Government
  - Mayor: Esteban Florentino

Area
  - Total: 2,293 km^{2} (885 sq mi)

Population
  - Total: 51,334
  - Density: 22.39/km^{2} (57.98/sq mi)
- UBIGEO: 0212
- Website: Official website

Huaylas is one of 20 provinces of the Ancash Region in Peru.

== Geography ==
The Cordillera Blanca and the Cordillera Negra traverse the province. Some of the highest peaks of the province are Artesonraju, Chacraraju, Quitaraju, Pucajirca, Pucaraju and Huandoy. Other mountains are listed below:

- Alpamayo
- Chaka
- Champara
- Hatun Hirka
- Hatun Kunka
- Kita Raqsa
- Kunka
- Kushuru
- Mashma Chaka
- Millpuq
- Millwaqucha
- Minas Hirka
- Misa Pampa
- Mishi Hirka
- Misk'iqucha
- Pacha Pallay
- Parya Cruz
- Pilanku
- Pirámide
- Pirqa Rumi
- Puka Punta
- Puma Pampa
- Putaqa
- Qaqa Rumi Kunka
- Qiru Willka
- Qullpa Hanka
- Qulluta
- Quñuqranra
- Quyllurqucha
- Rinrihirka
- Rukutu Punta
- Rumi Cruz
- Simiyuq Wank'a
- Sintiru
- Suyt'uqucha
- Tawlli Qaqa
- Tawllirahu
- Taya Pampa
- Tinyaqucha
- Wamanpinta
- Wamp'u (Huaylas)
- Wamp'u (Huaylas-Yungay)
- Willka
- Wira Wira

Some of the largest lakes of the province are Arwayqucha, Hatunqucha, Ichikqucha, Pukaqucha, Quyllurqucha, Tawlliqucha and Wiqruqucha.

== Political division ==
Huaylas is divided into ten districts, which are:

District	Map
Caraz	Map of the Huaylas province showing its districts
Huallanca	Map of the Huaylas province showing its districts
Huata	Map of the Huaylas province showing its districts
Huaylas	Map of the Huaylas province showing its districts
Mato	Map of the Huaylas province showing its districts
Pamparomas	Map of the Huaylas province showing its districts
Pueblo Libre	Map of the Huaylas province showing its districts
Santa Cruz	Map of the Huaylas province showing its districts
Santo Toribio	Map of the Huaylas province showing its districts
Yuracmarca	Map of the Huaylas province showing its districts

== Ethnic groups ==
The people in the province are mainly indigenous citizens of Quechua descent. Quechua is the language which the majority of the population (57.20%) learnt to speak in childhood, 42.59% of the residents started speaking using the Spanish language (2007 Peru Census).

== See also ==
- Allpamayu (river)
- Santa River
- Yuraqmayu
- Yuraqqucha
