= Caraz =

Caraz San Ildefonso de Caraz
- Town
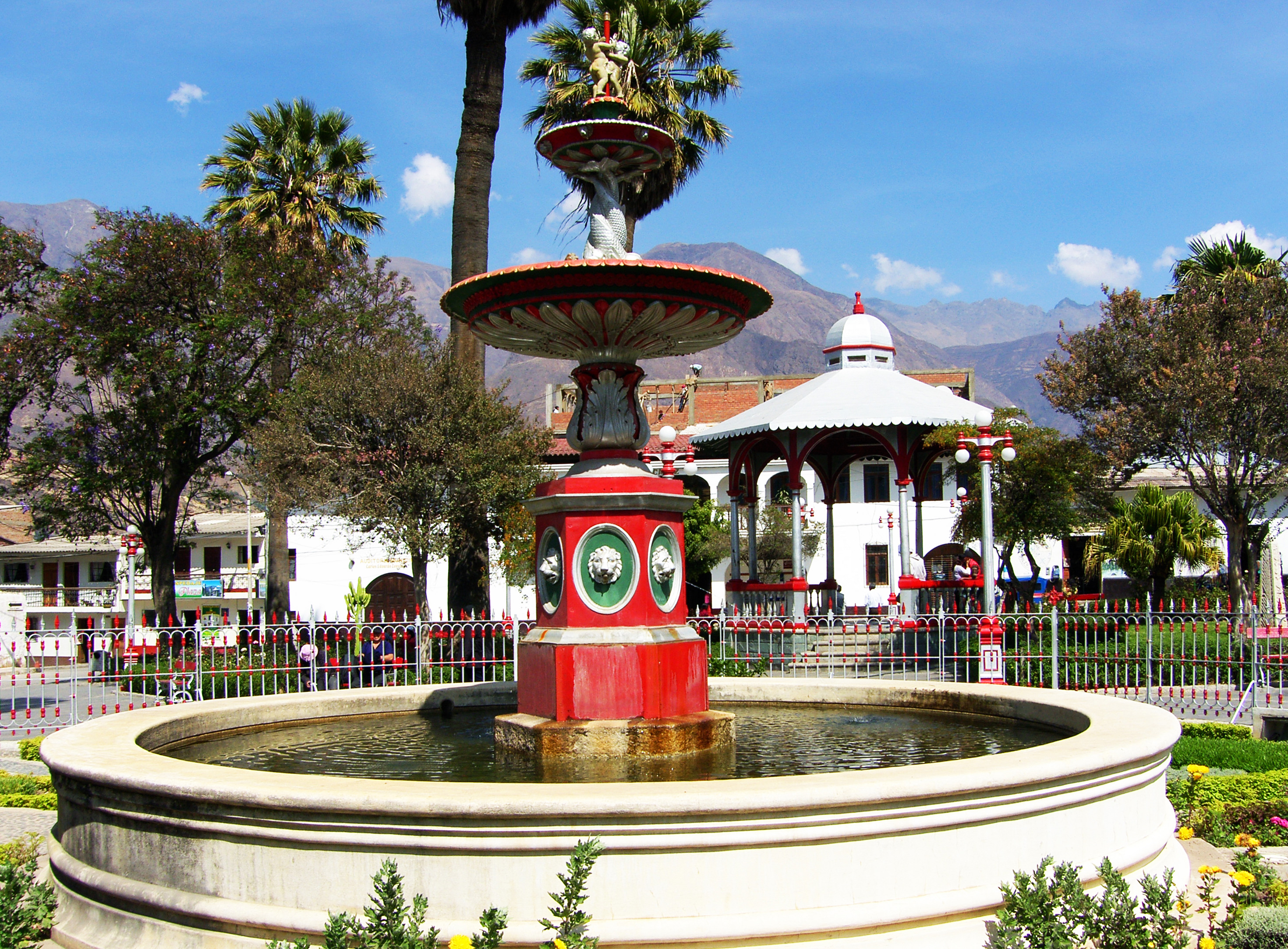
- Main Plaza

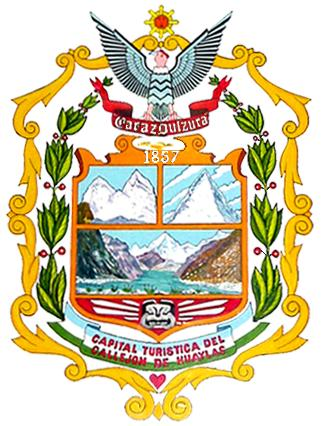
- Flag Seal
- Nickname: La muy fiel ciudad de Caraz (The very faithful city of Caraz)
- Location within Peru
- Coordinates: 9°2′40″S 77°48′28″W
- Country: Peru
- Region: Ancash
- Province: Huaylas
- District: Caraz
- Founded: 29 December 1856

Government
  - Mayor: Esteban Florentino Tranca (2019-2022)

Area
  - Total: 246.52 km^{2} (95.18 sq mi)
- Elevation: 2,256 m (7,402 ft)

Population (2015)
  - Total: 14,250
  - Density: 57.80/km^{2} (149.7/sq mi)
- Time zone: -5
- Website: www.municaraz.gob.pe

Caraz is a town in the Caraz District in the southeastern part of Huaylas Province of the Ancash Region in Peru.

== Political Creation ==
Recent investigations suggest that its political creation happened on 12 February 1821 when General San Martín, while staying in Huaura (village north of Lima), founded four departments including Huaylas, which had Caraz as its capital. In 1857 it was split in two, giving birth to the new province of Huaraz. The District of Caraz was created by the Administration of Liberation of Don Simón Bolivar, legitimized by law on December 29, 1857, and sanctioned a year later. The city of Caraz became the capital of the Province of Huaylas on July 25, 1857.

== Etymology ==
The origin of the name Caraz is uncertain. One possibility is that it derives from the Quechua word QARA-PUNKu, meaning "leather door", as the doors in Caraz were once covered with leather. Don Celso V. Torres maintains that the name comes from the Quechua word KALLASH meaning sterile and without vegetation. Another possibility is that it comes from the Quechua word QARAS, referring to the magüey plants found in the area.

== Geography ==
The town is located at an elevation of about 2250 m in the Cordillera Blanca mountain range. It keeps the traditional architecture and life style of an Andean village, as the remaining cities in the valley were destroyed after the 1970 Ancash earthquake.

== Communications ==
Caraz is 460 km NE from Lima (Peru's capital) via the Panamerican Highway (Route 1N) until km 202, then turn to the East via Route 3N through Huaraz. From Chimbote via the Canyon del Pato (184 km), the first 64 km until Chiquicara are paved, then a dirt road, and finally the last 22 km before Caraz again paved. There are daily flights from Lima Jorge Chavez International, via LC Busre, flying with Fairchild 19-seat Metroliner III, the Anta airport (ATA) is about 45 km S from Caraz.

== Tourist attractions ==
Caraz is a popular destination for trekking and day walks into the Huascaran National Park, and offers a much quieter and safer option when compared with Huaraz. The weather (due to the altitude) is gentle and provides a comfortable stay.

Paron Lake, the largest lake on the Cordillera Blanca, is 32 km East from the city, at 4200m, and is surrounded by 15 snow peaks.

Canyon del Pato, a rock formation, resulting from the approach of Cordilleras Blanca and Negra, 22 km north from the city.

Puya Raimondii, the largest flower in the world, it grows at 4200m at Huashta Punta pass, on the Cordillera Negra, 45 km West from the city.

Tumshukayko, a pre inca remain dating about 3000 years old. Fine stone work on what it seems to be a place for worship, 1 km north from the Plaza de Armas.

Santa Cruz valley, 28 km NE from the city, it's the famous 4-day trek Santa Cruz - Llankanuku, that leads to visit the not less famous mounts Alpamayo 5947m (World's Most Beautiful Mountain) and Artesonraju 6025m (Paramount's live logo).

Huascaran National Park, a 340,000H, with access from the valleys Paron, Santa Cruz and Los Cedros.

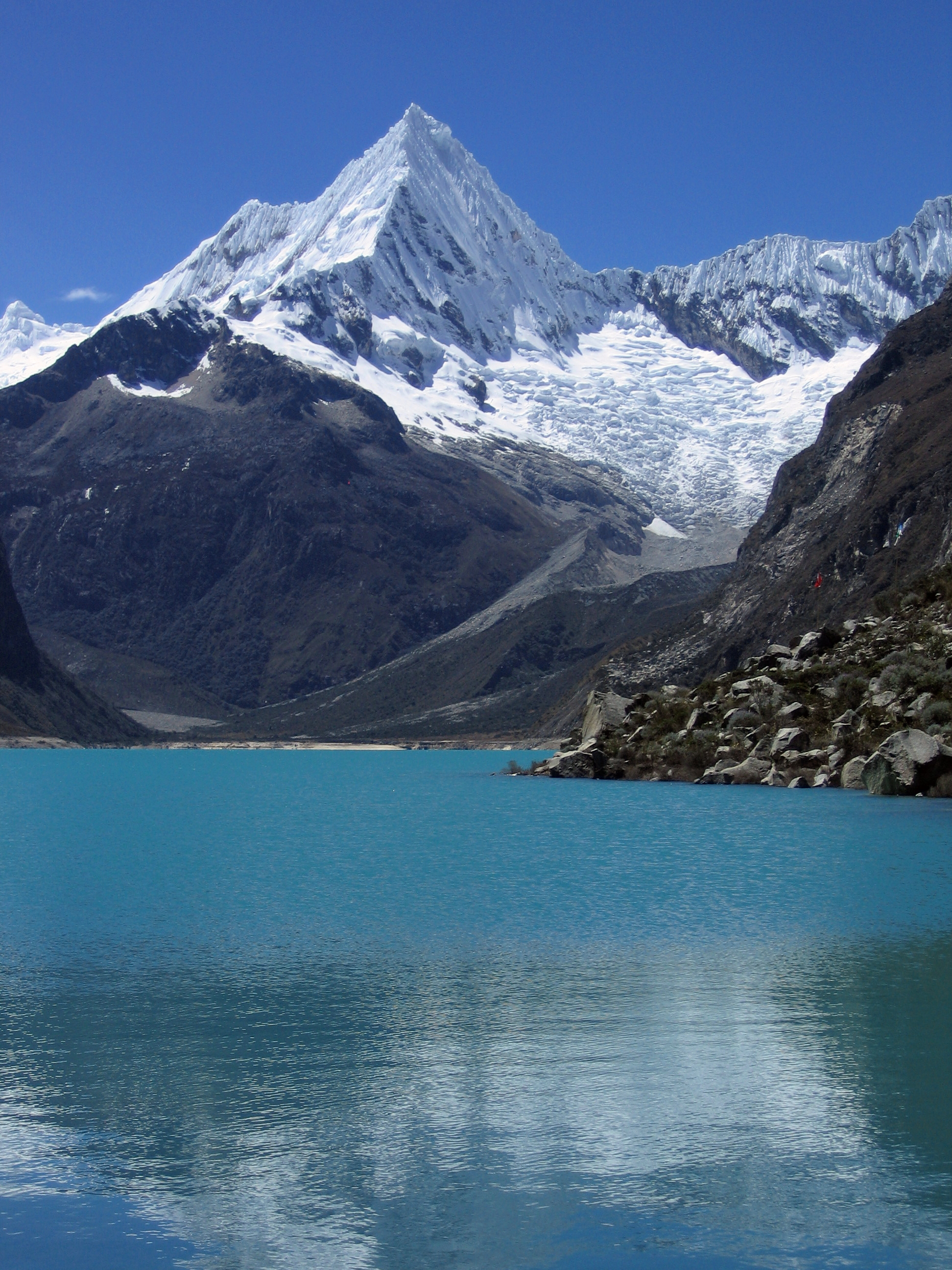
Paron Lake

== Sister cities ==
- (United States) Mesa, Arizona, since 1989
