= Santa Cruz (mountain) =

Mountain in Peru

- Pucaraju
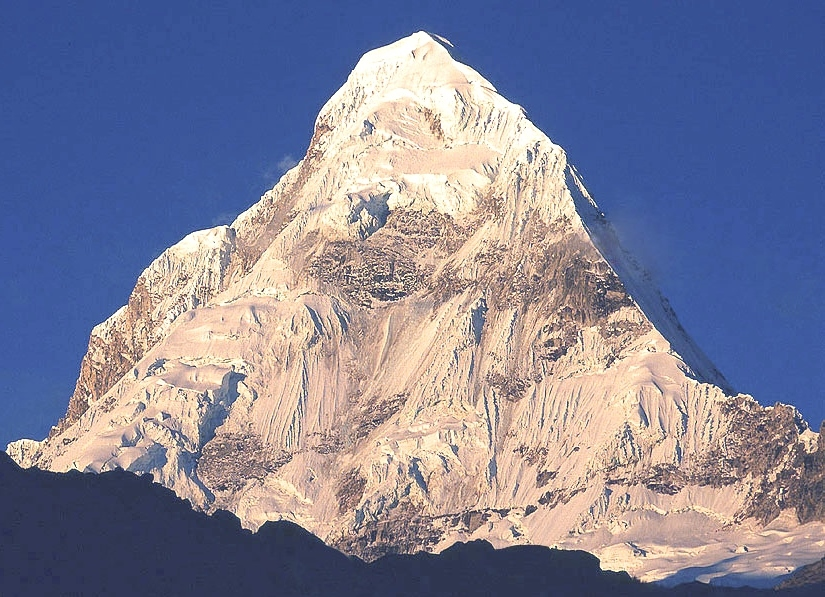
- West face.

Highest point
- Elevation: 6,259 m (20,535 ft)
- Coordinates: 8°53′39″S 77°42′30″W

Geography
- Location within Peru
- Location: Ancash, Peru
- Parent range: Cordillera Blanca, Andes

Climbing
- First ascent: 20 July 1948 by Frédéric Marmillod and Ali Szepessy-Schaurek

Santa Cruz, Pucaraju, Pukaraju (possibly from Quechua puka red, rahu snow, ice, mountain with snow) or Pico de Huaylas (Spanish for "peak of Huaylas") is a mountain in the Cordillera Blanca in the Andes of Peru; within Santa Cruz District, Huaylas Province, Ancash. It has a height of 6,259 metres (20,535 ft), although other maps cite a height of 6,241 metres (20,476 ft).

== See also ==
- Lake Atuncocha
- Caraz
- Taulliraju
