= Alpamayo =

Mountain in Peruvian Andes

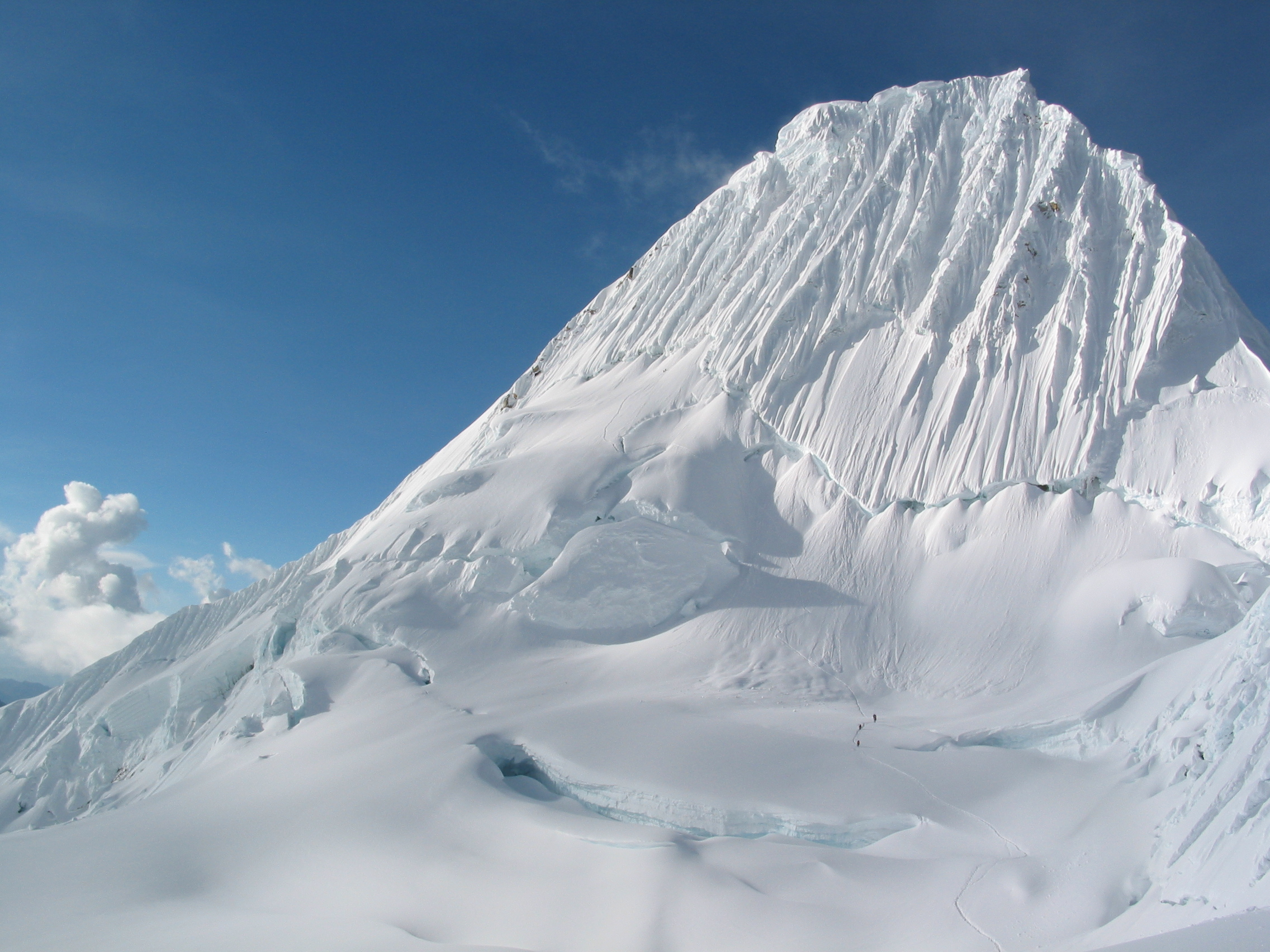

Highest point
- Elevation: 5,947 m (19,511 ft)
- Prominence: 524 m (1,719 ft)
- Parent peak: Quitaraju
- Coordinates: 08°52.75′S 77°39.22′W

Naming
- Native name: Shuyturaju (Quechua)

Geography
- Location within Peru
- Location: Ancash, Peru
- Parent range: Cordillera Blanca

Climbing
- First ascent: June 20, 1957, by Günter Hauser, Berhard Huhn and Horst Wiedmann.
- Easiest route: Difficult snow/ice climb on SW face

Alpamayo (possibly from Quechua allpa earth, mayu river, "earth river") or Shuyturaju (possibly from Ancash Quechua huytu, shuytu oblong, slim and long, Quechua rahu snow, ice, mountain covered in snow) is one of the most conspicuous peaks in the Cordillera Blanca of the Peruvian Andes. Alpamayo Creek originates northwest of it. The Alpamayo lies next to the slightly higher Quitaraju.

== Climbing history and routes ==
Most popular routes start from the village of Caraz, on the north of the Cordillera Blanca. A French-Belgian expedition including George and Claude Kogan claimed to have made the first ascent in 1951. After studying the photos in George Kogan's book The Ascent of Alpamayo, the German team of G. Hauser, F. Knauss, B. Huhn & H. Wiedmann came to the conclusion that the 1951 team did not reach the actual summit, thereby making their ascent via the north ridge in 1957 the first.

The most common climbing route, known as the Ferrari route, is situated on the southwest face of the mountain. It was opened in 1975 by a group of Italian alpinists led by Casimiro Ferrari. It is considered a difficult climb, demanding good crampon and ice climbing technique. There are incomparable views of steep ice faces, penitentes, gigantic white walls and ridges like those of Huandoy Norte, Artesonraju and Huascaran Norte, similar to the finest of the Himalayan scenery. There are also at least six other alternative climbing routes, the second most popular being the Vasque-French route.

Since 1966, it has been described by various publications as one of the most beautiful peaks in the world.
