= Ocros (disambiguation) =

Ocros can refer to a city, a district and a province in Peru.

For the use of the term in a specific setting, see:

- Ocros for the town in Peru.
- Ocros Province for the province in the Ancash Region.
- Ocros District, Ocros for the district in the Ocros province.
- Ocros District, Huamanga for the district in the Huamanga province.
