= Ocros District =

Ocros District may refer to:

- Ocros District, Ocros
- Ocros District, Huamanga
