= Regional governments of Peru =

Government of a Peruvian region

The regional governments (Spanish: gobiernos regionales) of the government of Peru administer each of the country's 24 departments, as well as the Constitutional Province of Callao and the Province of Metropolitan Lima. It has political, economic, and administrative autonomy in the subjects of its matter. The Constitution of Peru first mandated the establishment of regional governments in 1979.

== History ==
Historically, Peru's departments and littoral provinces (autonomous regimes equal in status to a department) were administered by a prefect (prefecto), while provinces were administered by a sub-prefect (sub-prefecto). Prefects were originally known as departmental presidents (presidentes de departamentos), and replaced the intendants (intendente), who performed similar functions as administrators of the Viceroyalty's first-level administrative divisions, known as intendancies (intendencias). From 1836 to 1856, when a new constitution was passed, Peru's littoral provinces were administered by governors (gobernador).

The current system was established through Law No. 27783, passed in 2002.

== Structure ==
The regional governments of Peru are composed of two vibrant sections: a Regional Council, which is the regulatory and oversight body of the regional governments, with a minimum of 7 and a maximum of 25 members; and the Regional Presidency, which serves as the executive organ of the regional government. The president of the latter is elected by direct suffrage in conjunction with a regional vice-president for a period of four years. In addition, it is made up of regional management which is coordinated and directed by a general manager.

=== Assembly ===
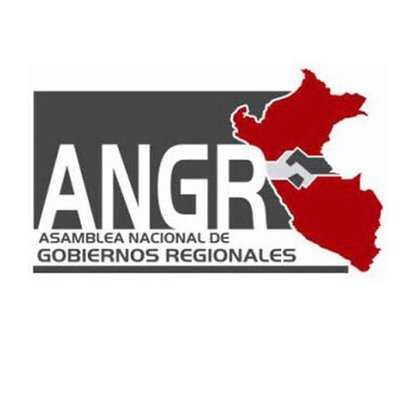
Logo of the ANGR.

The National Assembly of Regional Governments (Spanish: Asamblea Nacional de Gobiernos Regionales; ANGR) is the assembly in charge of promoting the country's decentralisation.

== Election ==
The election of the members of the Regional Council, including the President and Vice-President, is held by direct suffrage for a period of four years. Their offices are unresignable but are revocable. The next regional election is October 4, 2026.

== Governor list ==
In addition to the governments listed below, the Metropolitan Municipality of Lima is the local government (in status to a regional government) that administers Metropolitan Lima.

Region	Governor	Term start	Term end
Amazonas	Gilmer Horna Corrales	January 1, 2023	January 1, 2027
Áncash	Fabián Noriega Brito	January 1, 2023	January 1, 2027
Apurímac	Percy Godoy Medina	January 1, 2023	January 1, 2027
Arequipa	Rohel Sánchez Sánchez	January 1, 2023	January 1, 2027
Ayacucho	Wilfredo Oscorima Núñez	January 1, 2023	January 1, 2027
Cajamarca	Roger Guevara	January 1, 2023	January 1, 2027
Callao	Ciro Castillo Rojo	January 1, 2023	January 1, 2027
Cuzco	Werner Salcedo	January 1, 2023	January 1, 2027
Huancavelica	Leoncio Huayllani Taype	January 1, 2023	January 1, 2027
Huánuco	Antonio Pulgar Lucas	January 1, 2023	January 1, 2027
Ica	Rocky Hurtado	January 1, 2023	January 1, 2027
Junín	Zósimo Cárdenas Muje	January 1, 2023	January 1, 2027
La Libertad	Joana del Rosario Cabrera Pimentel	October 14, 2025	January 1, 2027
Lambayeque	Jorge Pérez Flores	January 1, 2023	January 1, 2027
Lima	Rosa Vásquez Cuadrado	January 1, 2023	January 1, 2027
Loreto	Jorge René Chávez Silvano	January 1, 2023	January 1, 2027
Madre de Dios	Luis Otsuka Salazar	January 1, 2023	January 1, 2027
Moquegua	Gilia Gutiérrez	January 1, 2023	January 1, 2027
Pasco	Juan Luis Chombo Heredia	January 1, 2023	January 1, 2027
Piura	Luis Neyra León	January 1, 2023	January 1, 2027
Puno	Richard Hancco Soncco	January 1, 2023	January 1, 2027
San Martín	Walter Grundel Jiménez	January 1, 2023	January 1, 2027
Tacna	Luis Torres Robledo	January 1, 2023	January 1, 2027
Tumbes	Segismundo Cruces Ordinola	January 1, 2023	January 1, 2027
Ucayali	Manuel Gambini Rupay	January 1, 2023	January 1, 2027

== See also ==
- Administrative divisions of Peru
- Former regions of Peru
- Government of Peru
