= Inca Huajanan =

Mountain in Peru

- Location within Peru

Highest point
- Elevation: 3,200 m (10,500 ft)
- Coordinates: 10°29′55″S 77°21′50″W

Geography
- Location: Peru, Ancash Region
- Parent range: Andes

Inca Huajanan or Inka Waqanan (Quechua inka Inca, waqay to cry, -na a suffix, "where the Inca cries", -n a suffix, also spelled Inca Huajanan, Inca Huaccanan) is a mountain in the Andes of Peru which reaches a height of approximately 3,200 m (10,499 ft). It is located in the Ancash Region, Ocros Province, Acas District. Inca Huajanan lies southwest of the archaeological site of Yanaque - Quilcamarca.

== See also ==
- South America
