= Carhuapampa District =

Coordinates: 9°19′59″S 78°03′00″W

Carhuapampa Qarwapampa
- District
- Interactive map of Carhuapampa
- Country: Peru
- Region: Ancash
- Province: Ocros
- Founded: September 30, 1941
- Capital: Aco

Government
  - Mayor: Artemio Norberto Robles De La Cruz

Area
  - Total: 109.78 km^{2} (42.39 sq mi)
- Elevation: 2,228 m (7,310 ft)

Population (2005 census)
  - Total: 393
  - Density: 3.58/km^{2} (9.27/sq mi)
- Time zone: UTC-5 (PET)
- UBIGEO: 021404

Carhuapampa District is one of ten districts of the Ocros Province in Peru.

== See also ==
- Uchku
