= Lukma Punta =

Mountain in Peru

- Location within Peru

Highest point
- Elevation: 4,600 m (15,100 ft)
- Coordinates: 10°18′42″S 77°19′20″W

Geography
- Location: Peru, Ancash Region
- Parent range: Andes

Lukma Punta (Quechua lukma Lucuma bifera, punta peak; ridge, "lúcuma peak (or ridge)", also spelled Lucmapunta) is a mountain in the Andes of Peru which reaches a height of approximately 4,600 m (15,092 ft). It is located in the Ancash Region, Ocros Province, Ocros District.
