= Cochas District =

Cochas District may refer to:

- Cochas District, Concepción
- Cochas District, Ocros
- Cochas District, Yauyos
