= San Cristóbal de Rajan District =

Coordinates: 8°55′01″S 78°07′01″W

San Cristóbal de Rajan
- District
- Interactive map of San Cristóbal de Rajan
- Country: Peru
- Region: Ancash
- Province: Ocros
- Founded: October 15, 1954
- Capital: Rajan

Area
  - Total: 67.75 km^{2} (26.16 sq mi)
- Elevation: 3,605 m (11,827 ft)

Population (2005 census)
  - Total: 473
  - Density: 6.98/km^{2} (18.1/sq mi)
- Time zone: UTC-5 (PET)
- UBIGEO: 021408

San Cristóbal de Rajan District is one of ten districts of the Ocros Province in Peru.

== See also ==
- Uchku
- Wanaku
