= Acas District =

Coordinates: 10°27′00″S 77°19′01″W

Acas
- District
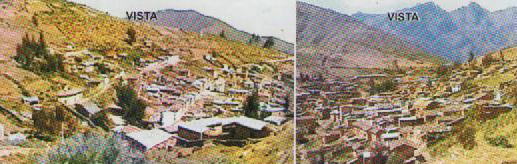
- Interactive map of Acas
- Country: Peru
- Region: Ancash
- Province: Ocros
- Founded: January 2, 1857
- Capital: Acas

Government
  - Mayor: Albert Minaya Aldave

Area
  - Total: 252.48 km^{2} (97.48 sq mi)
- Elevation: 3,689 m (12,103 ft)

Population (2005 census)
  - Total: 424
  - Density: 1.68/km^{2} (4.35/sq mi)
- Time zone: UTC-5 (PET)
- UBIGEO: 021402

Acas District is one of ten districts of the Ocros Province in Peru.

== See also ==
- Inka Waqanan
- Yanaqi - Qillqamarka
