= Santiago de Chilcas District =

Coordinates: 10°28′01″S 77°24′00″W

Santiago de Chilcas
- District
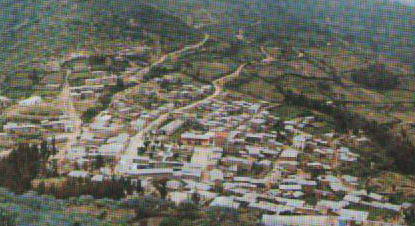
- Interactive map of Santiago de Chilcas
- Country: Peru
- Region: Ancash
- Province: Ocros
- Founded: November 19, 1958
- Capital: Santiago de Chilcas

Area
  - Total: 85.76 km^{2} (33.11 sq mi)
- Elevation: 3,657 m (11,998 ft)

Population (2005 census)
  - Total: 382
  - Density: 4.45/km^{2} (11.5/sq mi)
- Time zone: UTC-5 (PET)
- UBIGEO: 021410

Santiago de Chilcas District is one of ten districts of the Ocros Province in Peru.

Alternative Names: Cerro Niumay

Type: Mountain - an elevation standing high above the surrounding area with small summit area, steep slopes and local relief of 300m or more
