= San Pedro District, Ocros =

Coordinates: 9°09′00″S 78°16′18″W

San Pedro District
- District
- Interactive map of San Pedro District
- Country: Peru
- Region: Ancash
- Province: Ocros
- Founded: January 17, 1945
- Capital: Copa

Government
  - Mayor: Uzias Aron Ariza Aguirre

Area
  - Total: 547.03 km^{2} (211.21 sq mi)
- Elevation: 2,219 m (7,280 ft)

Population (2005 census)
  - Total: 890
  - Density: 1.6/km^{2} (4.2/sq mi)
- Time zone: UTC-5 (PET)
- UBIGEO: 021409

San Pedro District is one of ten districts of the Ocros Province in Peru.
