= Regional Government of Áncash =

Regional government in Peru

- Gobierno Regional de Áncash

Regional Government overview
- Formed: January 1, 2003; 22 years ago
- Jurisdiction: Department of Ancash
- Headquarters: Huaraz
- Website: Government site

The Regional Government of Ancash (Spanish: Gobierno Regional de Áncash; GORE Áncash) is the regional government that represents the Department of Ancash. It is the body with legal identity in public law and its own assets, which is in charge of the administration of provinces of the department in Peru. Its purpose is the social, cultural and economic development of its constituency. It is based in the city of Huaraz.

== List of representatives ==
Regional Presidents

- Jaime Minaya Castromonte (1990–1991)
- Alberto Alfaro Beltrán (1991–1993)

No.	Governor	Political party	Period
1	Freddy Ghilardi	APRA	January 1, 2003–November 28, 2003
2	Ricardo Narváez Soto	APRA	November 29, 2003–December 31, 2006
3	César Álvarez Aguilar	Movimiento Regional Cuenta Conmigo	January 1, 2007–December 31, 2010
-	César Álvarez Aguilar	Movimiento Regional Cuenta Conmigo	January 1, 2011–May 19, 2014
4	Florencio Román Reyna	Movimiento Regional Cuenta Conmigo	May 20, 2014–June 12, 2014
5	Zenón Ayala López	Movimiento Regional Puro Áncash	June 13, 2014–December 31, 2014
6	Enrique Vargas Barrenechea	Movimiento Regional Puro Áncash	January 1, 2015–December 31
7	Waldo Ríos Salcedo	Movimiento Regional Puro Áncash	January 1, 2019–December 31
-	Enrique Vargas Barrenechea	Movimiento Regional Puro Áncash	October 6, 2016–April 10, 2017
8	Luis Gamarra Alor	Movimiento Regional Río Santa Caudaloso	April 19, 2017–December 31, 2018
9	Juan Carlos Morillo Ulloa	Somos Perú	January 1, 2019–May 15, 2020
10	Henry Borja Cruzado	Somos Perú	June 1, 2020–December 31, 2022
11	Koki Noriega	Alianza Gobierno Unidad y Acción	January 1, 2023–Incumbent

== See also ==
- Regional Governments of Peru
- Department of Ancash
