= Uchku (Ancash) =

Mountain in Peru

- Location within Peru

Highest point
- Elevation: 4,600 m (15,100 ft)
- Coordinates: 10°26′56″S 77°14′59″W

Geography
- Location: Peru, Ancash Region
- Parent range: Andes

Uchku (Quechua for hole, pit, also spelled Uchco) is a mountain in the Andes of Peru which reaches a height of approximately 4,600 m (15,092 ft). It is located in the Ancash Region, Ocros Province, on the border of the districts of Carhuapampa and Rajan.
