= Congas District =

Coordinates: 10°19′59″S 77°27′00″W

Congas
- District
- Interactive map of Congas
- Country: Peru
- Region: Ancash
- Province: Ocros
- Founded: December 13, 1943
- Capital: Congas

Government
  - Mayor: Elmer Ananias Gomero Cabanillas

Area
  - Total: 130.03 km^{2} (50.20 sq mi)
- Elevation: 3,055 m (10,023 ft)

Population (2005 census)
  - Total: 1,233
  - Density: 9.482/km^{2} (24.56/sq mi)
- Time zone: UTC-5 (PET)
- UBIGEO: 021406

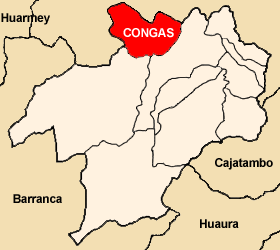

Congas District is one of ten districts of the Ocros Province in Peru.
