= Wanaku (Peru) =

Mountain in Peru

- Location within Peru

Highest point
- Elevation: 4,800 m (15,700 ft)
- Coordinates: 10°25′43″S 77°16′03″W

Geography
- Location: Peru, Ancash Region
- Parent range: Andes

Wanaku (Quechua for guanaco, also spelled Guanaco) is a mountain in the Andes of Peru which reaches a height of approximately 4,800 m (15,700 ft). It is located in the Ancash Region, Ocros Province, Rajan District.
