= Llipa District =

Coordinates: 10°30′S 77°15′W

Llipa
- District
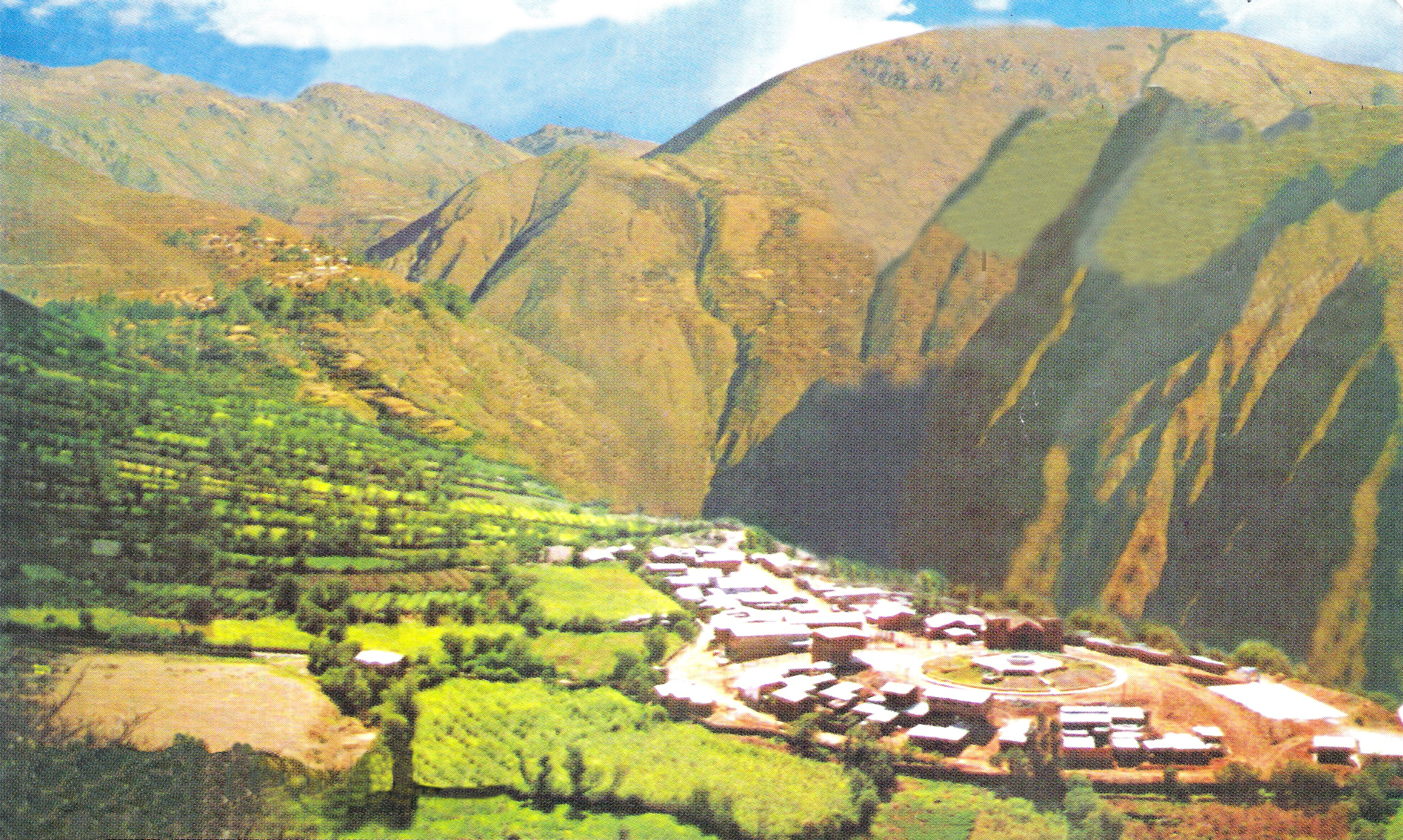
- Llipa
- Interactive map of Llipa
- Country: Peru
- Region: Ancash
- Province: Ocros
- Founded: November 15, 1957
- Capital: Llipa

Government
  - Mayor: Carlos Armando Mariano Dueñas

Area
  - Total: 82.10 km^{2} (31.70 sq mi)
- Elevation: 3,020 m (9,910 ft)

Population (2005 census)
  - Total: 204
  - Density: 2.48/km^{2} (6.44/sq mi)
- Time zone: UTC-5 (PET)
- UBIGEO: 021407

Llipa District is one of ten districts of the Ocros Province in Peru.
