= Ciro Castillo Rojo =

Peruvian surgeon and politician (born 1950)

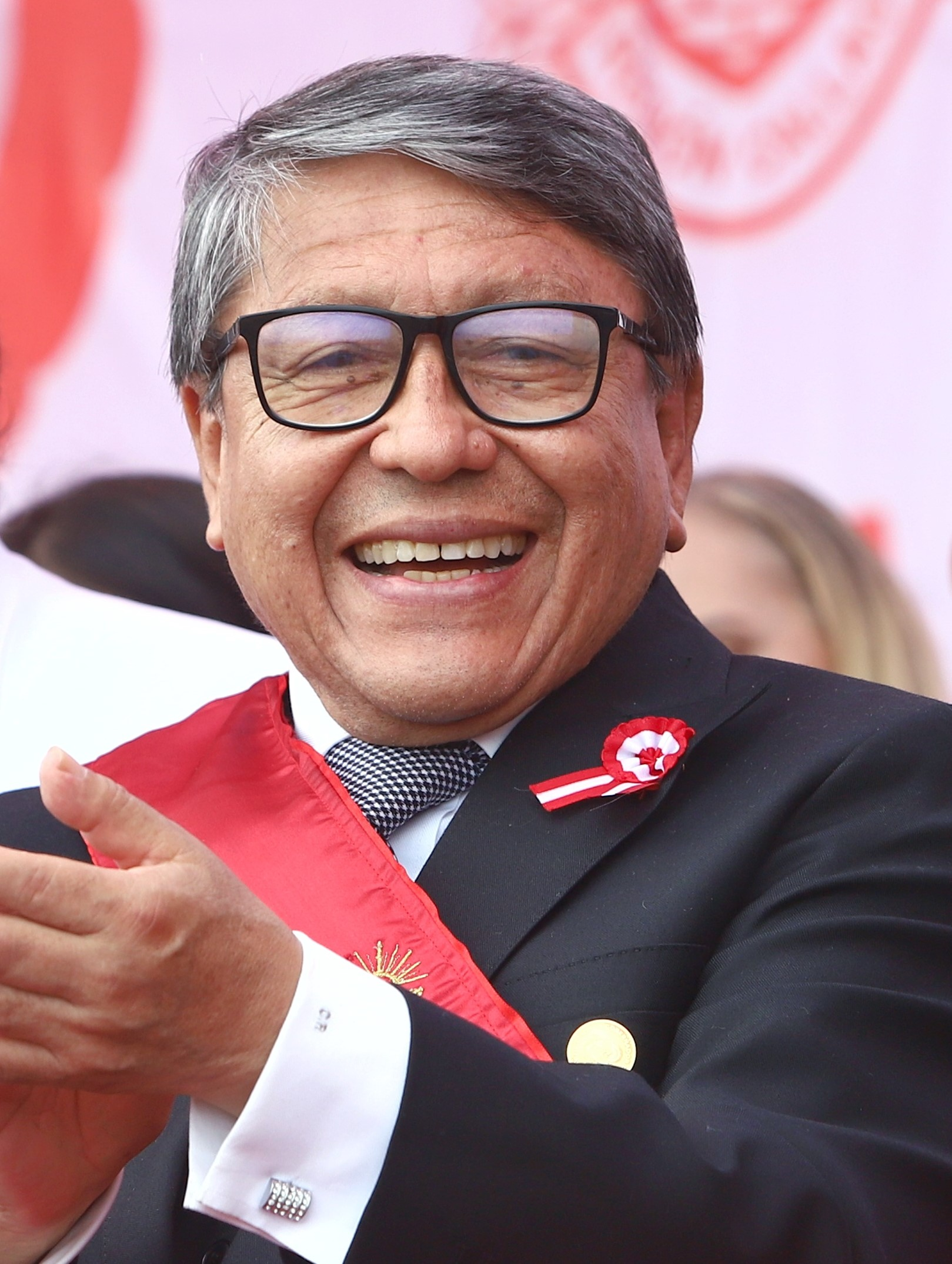
Governor Ciro Ronald Castillo-Rojo Salas

Ciro Ronald Castillo-Rojo Salas (Azángaro, July 7, 1950) is a Peruvian surgeon and politician. He is the current regional governor of Callao, Peruvian seaside city and region, since January 1, 2023.

== Biography ==
He graduated as a surgeon from the National University of San Marcos and has a specialization in General Surgery from the Cayetano Heredia University. Since 1985, he has been working as a surgeon.

He became well known when he led the search for his son Ciro in 2011, who disappeared in the Colca Valley. The search lasted for two hundred and two days, until he was found lifeless in a ravine of the snowy Bomboya mountain. The case received wide media coverage and inspired a miniseries called "Ciro, the Angel of Colca" which was broadcast by América Televisión.

In 2017, he was the regional health director (Diresa) of the department of Áncash.

== Political career ==
He attempted to register his political party, Perú Potencia, with the goal of running for the presidency of Peru. He ran for the Regional Government of Callao in the 2014 regional elections for Acción Popular, coming in second place. He ran again for the same position in the 2018 regional elections for the Alliance for Progress party, without success again.

In the 2016 parliamentary elections, he ran for the Congress of the Republic for Peruanos Por el Kambio, without success. He tried again in the 2020 extraordinary parliamentary elections for Perú Libre and in the 2021 parliamentary elections for Somos Perú.

In the 2022 regional elections, he was elected regional governor for Más Callao, after defeating Miguel Cordano, of Contigo Callao, in a runoff election.

== Controversies ==
In July 2023, the Sunday newspaper Panorama reported a leak in which he had appealed a payment of US$150,000. The Public Prosecutor's Office opened an investigation for alleged influence peddling. It was later reported in the media that one of the former councilors was sentenced by the Eighth Unipersonal Court of Callao.

During the same year, the Superior Court of Justice of Callao took protective measures in support of the vice-governor of the region, Edita Gladys Vargas Cerón, following reports of alleged threats from Castillo Rojo.
