= Regional Government of Loreto =

Regional government in Peru

- Gobierno Regional de Loreto

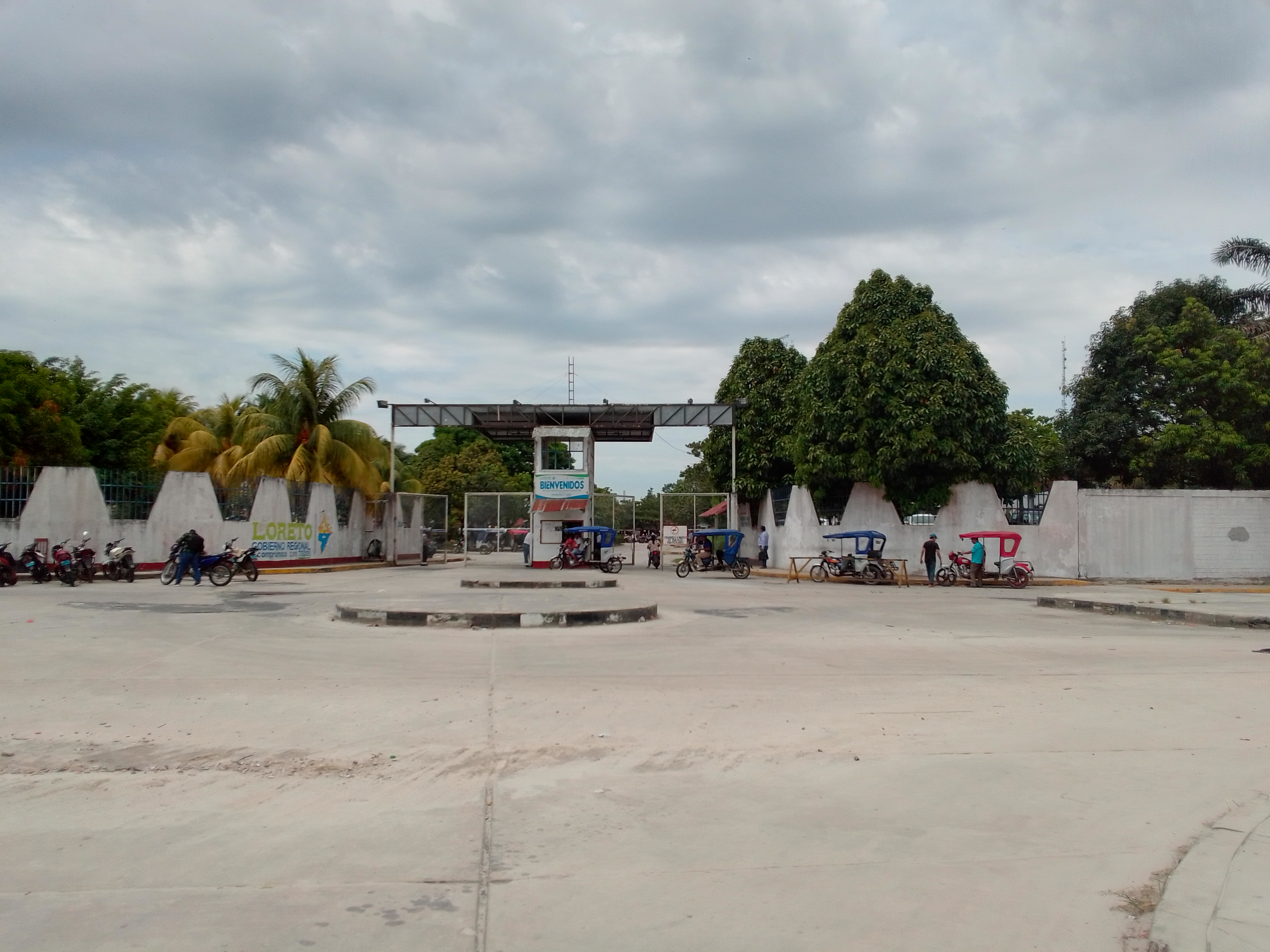

Regional Government overview
- Formed: January 1, 2003; 22 years ago
- Jurisdiction: Department of Loreto
- Website: Government site

The Regional Government of Loreto (Spanish: Gobierno Regional de; GORE Loreto) is the regional government that represents the Department of Loreto. It is the body with legal identity in public law and its own assets, which is in charge of the administration of provinces of the department in Peru. Its purpose is the social, cultural and economic development of its constituency. It is based in the city of Iquitos.

== List of representatives ==
Governor	Political party	Period
Robinson Rivadeneyra	Movimiento Político Regional UNIPOL	January 1, 2003–December 31, 2006
Yván Vásquez Valera	Fuerza Loretana	January 1, 2007–December 31, 2010
Yván Vásquez Valera	Fuerza Loretana	January 1, 2011–December 31, 2014
Fernando Meléndez Celis	Movimiento Integración Loretana	January 1, 2015–December 31, 2018
Elisbán Ochoa Sosa	Restauración Nacional	January 1, 2019–December 31, 2022
René Chávez Silvano	Somos Perú	January 1, 2023–Incumbent

== See also ==
- Regional Governments of Peru
- Department of Loreto
