= Alex Kouri =

Peruvian politician

2nd Governor of Callao
- In office 1 January 2007 – 31 December 2010
- Preceded by: Rogelio Canches
- Succeeded by: Félix Moreno

Mayor of Callao
- In office 1 January 1996 – 31 December 2006
- Preceded by: Kurt Woll Muller
- Succeeded by: Félix Moreno

Member of the Democratic Constituent Congress
- In office 26 November 1992 – 26 July 1995
- Constituency: National

Personal details
- Born: 7 April 1964 (age 62) Lima, Peru
- Party: Chim Pum Callao (1995-present)
- Other political affiliations: Christian People's Party (1989-1995)
- Education: University of Lima (LLB)
- Occupation: Lawyer, Politician

Alexander Martin Kouri Bumachar (born April 7, 1964), known as Alex Kouri, is a Peruvian lawyer and politician. Throughout his career, he has held multiple offices: president of Beneficiencia del Callao (1990), Congressman (1993-1995), three times elected Mayor of the city of Callao and Governor of Callao region.

He graduated in Law and Political Sciences at Universidad de Lima (Lima University). Law Doctor candidate at Jaen University (Universidad de Jaen), Spain. He holds a master's degree in Security, Crisis and Emergency from IUOG (Instituto Universitario Ortega y Gasset); as well as, Intelligence and Counter-Intelligence; and, Propaganda and Psico-social Operations, in CISDE (Spain). He has also undertaken advanced studies in Fundamental Rights and Globalization at Universidad Complutense (Madrid, Spain). He also teaches in several Peruvian universities, in under- and post- graduate studies.

He is also a published author of various books on Peruvian legislation, governance and security topics.

== Education ==
Alex Kouri graduated in Law and Political Sciences at Universidad de Lima (Lima University). Law Doctor candidate at Jaen University (Universidad de Jaen), Spain. He holds a master's degree in Security, Crisis and Emergency from IUOG (Instituto Universitario Ortega y Gasset); as well as, Intelligence and Counter-Intelligence; and, Propaganda and Psico-social Operations, in CISDE (Spain). He has also undertaken advanced studies in Fundamental Rights and Globalization at Universidad Complutense (Madrid, Spain). Additionally, he studied Administratio of Regional and Local governments at Haifa University in Israel. He also teaches in several Peruvian universities, in under- and post- graduate studies.

== Political career ==
He began his political career as a member of the Christian People's Party, became City Manager of Callao in 1990 and a Congressman in 1993. He then left the CPP to found his own movement, el Movimiento Chim Pum Callao, and was elected as Provincial Mayor three times between 1996 and 2006, then President of the Regional Government of Callao. In February 2010 he announced his candidacy for Mayor of Lima Province, but was later excluded from election to the office.

== Books & Publications ==
Published author of various books on Peruvian legislation, governance and security topics:

1. Fenomenología de la legalización de los partidos Bildu/Movadef (July 2013)
2. Reflexiones - bloqueo de celular es en prisoners de máxima Seguridad (desde la óptica de inteligencia)(July 2016)
3. Civiam Participationem- mecanismos de participación y control ciudadanos en el Perú (October 2016)
4. Jurisprudencia constitucional y gobernanza regional y local peruana 1997-2017 (compilación) (April 2017)
