= Regional Government of Callao =

Regional government in Peru

- Gobierno Regional del Callao
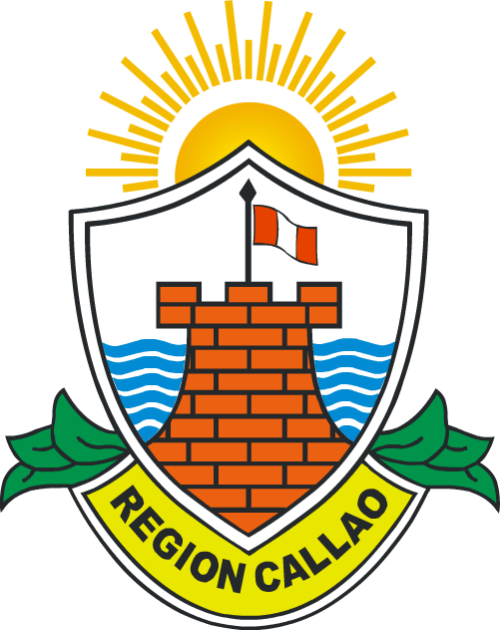

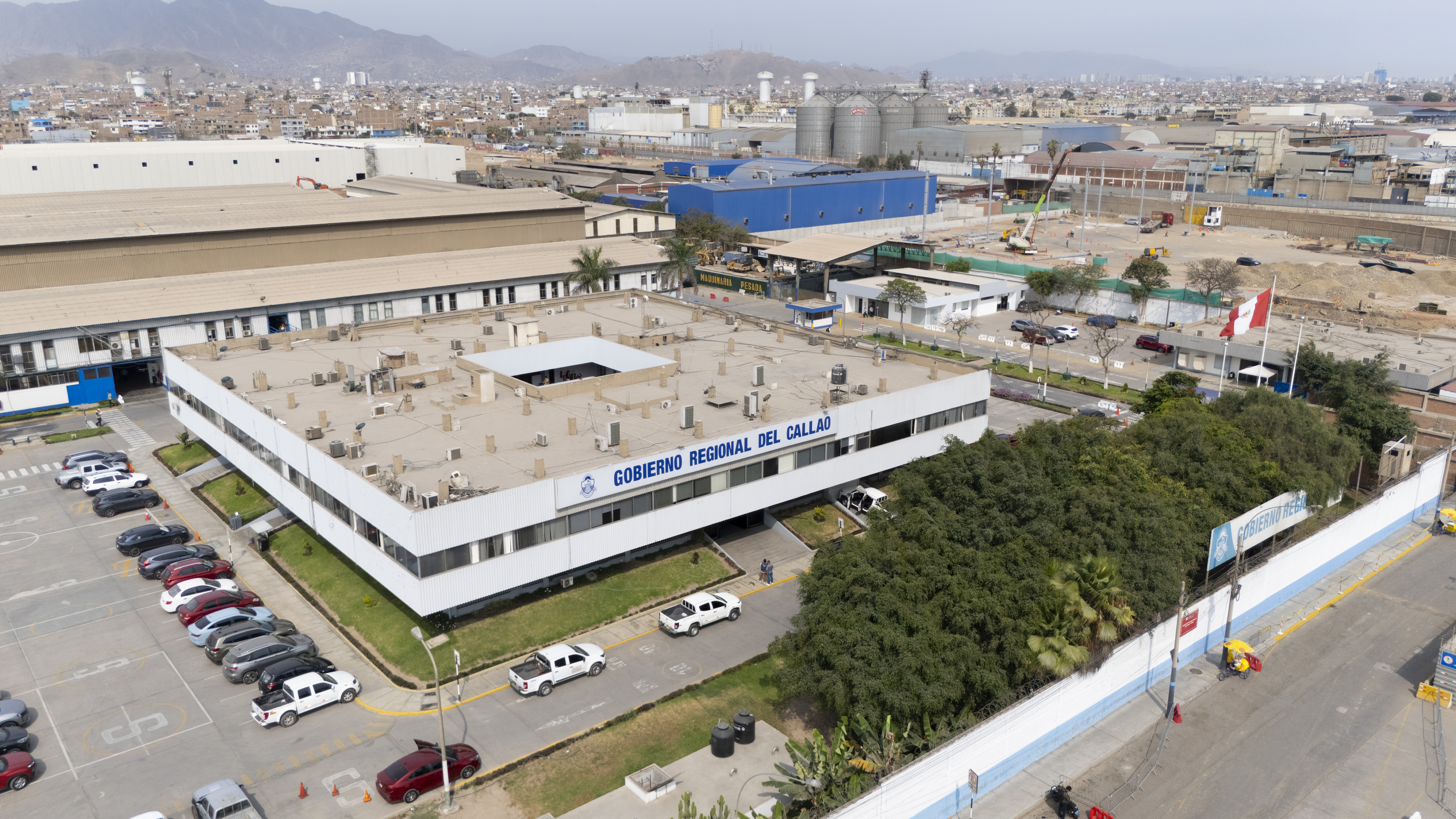

Regional Government overview
- Formed: January 1, 2003; 23 years ago
- Jurisdiction: Callao
- Website: Government site

The Regional Government of Callao (Spanish: Gobierno Regional de Callao; GORE Callao) is the regional government that represents Callao. It is the body with legal identity in public law and its own assets, which is in charge of the administration of provinces of the department in Peru. Its purpose is the social, cultural and economic development of its constituency. It is based in the city of Callao.

It is constituted by the Regional Governor and the Regional Council.

== Regional Governor ==
The executive power is represented by the Regional Governor of Callao, who serves a four-year term. The governor's election is direct, secret, uninominal, and decided by majority vote across the entire territory of the region.

The current governor in office is Ciro Castillo Rojo, appointed by the Regional Council of Callao. His term began on February 4, 2026, and will conclude on December 31, 2026.

== List of representatives ==
Governor	Political party	Period
Rogelio Canches	Perú Posible	January 1, 2003–December 31, 2006
Alex Kouri	Movimiento Independiente Chim Pum Callao	January 1, 2007–December 31, 2010
Félix Moreno	Movimiento Independiente Chim Pum Callao	January 1, 2011–December 31, 2014
Félix Moreno	Movimiento Independiente Chim Pum Callao	January 1, 2015–April 9, 2017
Dante Mandriotti	Por ti Callao	January 1, 2019–December 31, 2022
Ciro Castillo Rojo	Más Callao	January 1, 2023–December 17, 2025
Edita Vargas	We Are Peru	December 17, 2025–February 4, 2026
Ciro Castillo Rojo	Más Callao	February 4, 2026–Incumbent

== See also ==
- Regional Governments of Peru
- Department of Callao
