= Regional Government of Moquegua =

Regional government in Peru

- Gobierno Regional de Moquegua

Regional Government overview
- Formed: January 1, 2003; 22 years ago
- Jurisdiction: Department of Moquegua
- Website: Government site

The Regional Government of Moquegua (Spanish: Gobierno Regional de Moquegua; GORE Moquegua) is the regional government that represents the Department of Moquegua. It is the body with legal identity in public law and its own assets, which is in charge of the administration of provinces of the department in Peru. Its purpose is the social, cultural and economic development of its constituency. It is based in the city of Moquegua.

== List of representatives ==
Governor	Political party	Period
Cristala Constantinides	Somos Perú	January 1, 2003–December 31, 2006
Jaime Rodríguez	Movimiento Independiente Nuestro Ilo Moquegua	January 1, 2007–December 31, 2010
Martín Vizcarra	Integración Regional por Ti	January 1, 2011–December 31, 2014
Jaime Rodríguez	Movimiento Regional Kausachun	January 1, 2015–December 31, 2018
Zenón Cuevas	Frente de Integración Regional Moquegua Emprendedora (FIRME)	January 1, 2019–December 31, 2022
Gilia Gutiérrez	Somos Perú	January 1, 2023–Incumbent

== See also ==
- Regional Governments of Peru
- Department of Moquegua
