= Yanaque - Quilcamarca =

Archaeological site in Peru

- Interactive map of Yanaque - Quilcamarca
- 10°28′30″S 77°20′45″W
- Location: Peru, Ancash Region, Ocros Province

Site notes
- Height: 3,820 metres (12,533 ft)

Yanaque - Quilcamarca (possibly from Ancash Quechua yanaqi friend, Quechua qillqa writing (the act and art of writing), marka village,) is an archaeological site in Peru. It is situated in the Ancash Region, Ocros Province, Acas District, at a height of about 3,820 metres (12,533 ft).

Yanaque - Quilcamarca are the names of two villages which were situated on the mountain Yanaque and a neighboring mountain, legendary places which share the same history. The ruins contain rectangular, semi-circular and quadrangular structures of stone and tombs.
