= Regional Government of Cuzco =

Regional government in Peru

- Gobierno Regional del Cusco
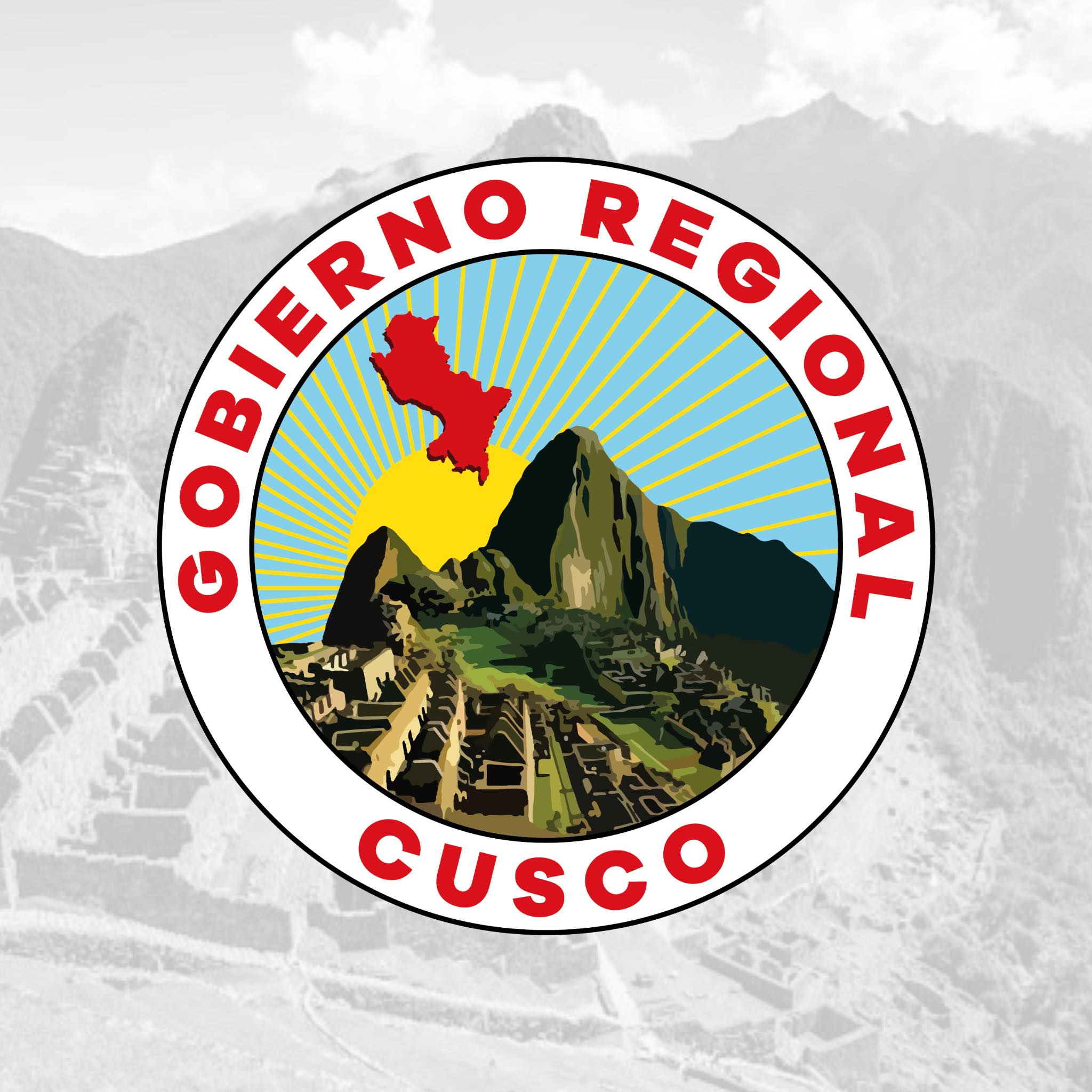

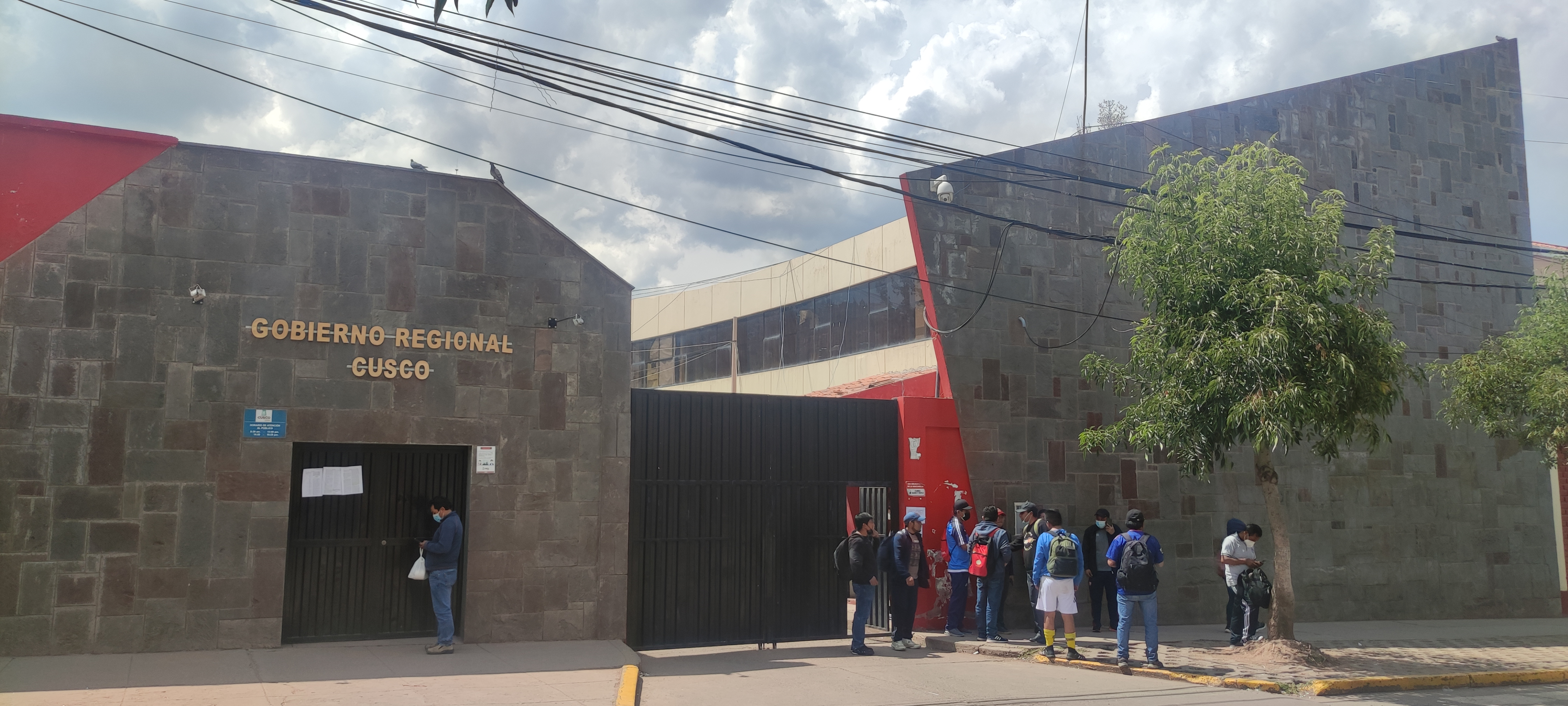

Regional Government overview
- Formed: January 1, 2003; 22 years ago
- Jurisdiction: Department of Cuzco
- Website: Government site

The Regional Government of Cuzco (Spanish: Gobierno Regional del Cuzco; GORE Cuzco) is the regional government that represents the Department of Cuzco. It is the body with legal identity in public law and its own assets, which is in charge of the administration of provinces of the department in Peru. Its purpose is the social, cultural and economic development of its constituency. It is based in the city of Cuzco.

== List of representatives ==
| Governor | Political party | Period |
|---|---|---|
| Carlos Cuaresma | Independent Moralizing Front | January 1, 2003–December 31, 2006 |
| Hugo Gonzales Sayán | Union for Peru | January 1, 2007–December 31, 2010 |
| Jorge Acurio Tito | Gran Alianza Nacionalista Cusco | January 1, 2011–December 26, 2013 |
| René Concha Lezama | Gran Alianza Nacionalista Cusco | January 3, 2014–December 31, 2014 |
| Edwin Licona | Kausachun Cusco | January 1, 2015–December 31, 2018 |
| Jean Paul Benavente | Popular Action | January 1, 2019–December 31, 2022 |
| Werner Salcedo | We Are Peru | January 1, 2023–Incumbent |

== See also ==
- Regional Governments of Peru
- Department of Cuzco
