= Werner Salcedo =

Peruvian politician (born 1977)

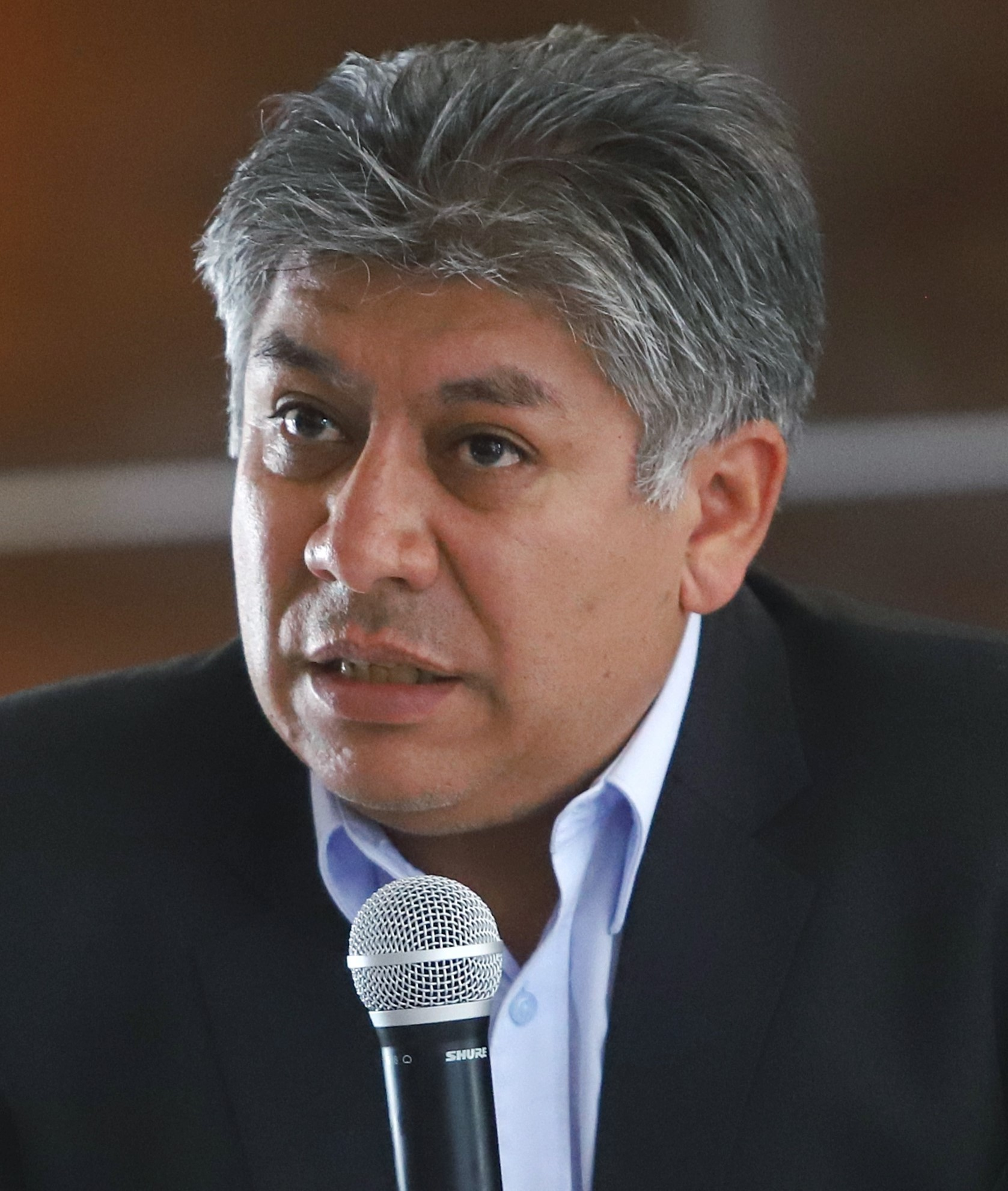
- Salcedo in 2024

Governor of Cusco
- Incumbent
- Assumed office 1 January 2023
- Preceded by: Jean Paul Benavente

Personal details
- Born: 27 January 1977 (age 49)
- Party: We Are Peru

Werner Máximo Salcedo Álvarez (born 27 January 1977) is a Peruvian politician serving as governor of Cusco since 2023. In 2024, he served as president of the National Assembly of Regional Governments.
