= Cochas District, Ocros =

Coordinates: 10°38′40″S 77°33′06″W

Cochas
- District
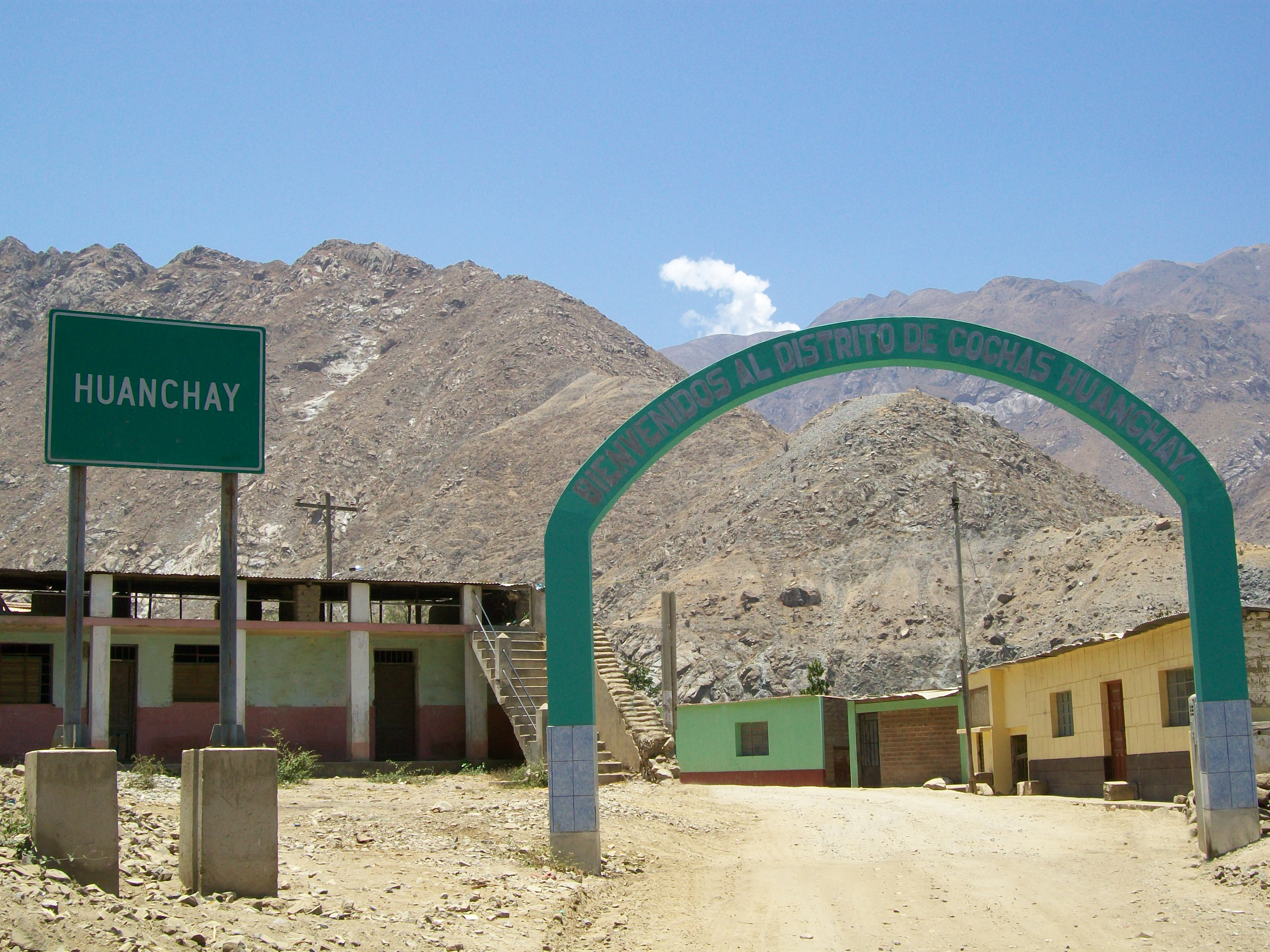
- Huanchay
- Interactive map of Cochas
- Country: Peru
- Region: Ancash
- Province: Ocros
- Founded: January 2, 1857
- Capital: Huanchay

Government
  - Mayor: Esperanza Juana Diaz Bartolo

Area
  - Total: 412.48 km^{2} (159.26 sq mi)
- Elevation: 1,350 m (4,430 ft)

Population (2005 census)
  - Total: 1,137
  - Density: 2.756/km^{2} (7.139/sq mi)
- Time zone: UTC-5 (PET)
- UBIGEO: 021405

Cochas District is one of ten districts of the Ocros Province in Peru.
