= La Viuda Island =

Island in Peru

Isla La Viuda (Spanish)
- Location within Peru

Geography
- Location: Pacific Ocean
- Coordinates: 9°20′55″S 78°27′56″W

Administration
- Peru
- Region: Ancash

Additional information
- Time zone: PET (UTC-5)

La Viuda Island (The Widow Island), also known as Los Chimús Island, is an island of Peru.

The island received its name "The Widow" after the frigate Mercedes sank off the island's shores in 1852, drowning 1,200, including the boat captain, whose wife survived the tragedy.
