= Ocros province =

Coordinates: 10°24′00″S 77°23′46″W

Ocros
- Province
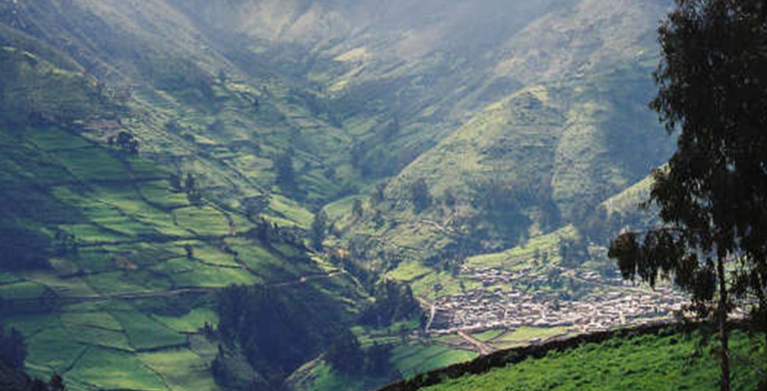
- Ocros

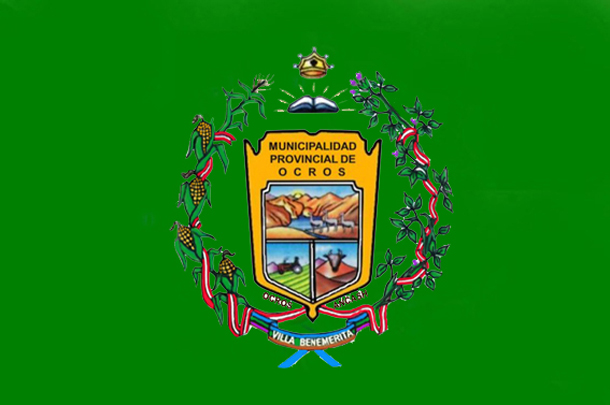
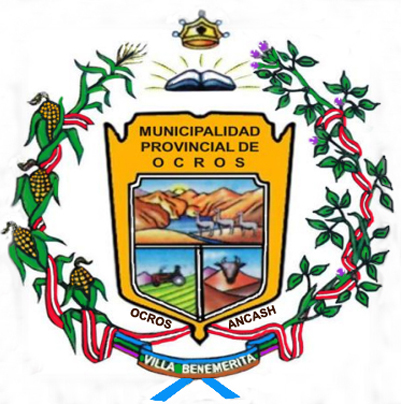
- Flag Coat of arms

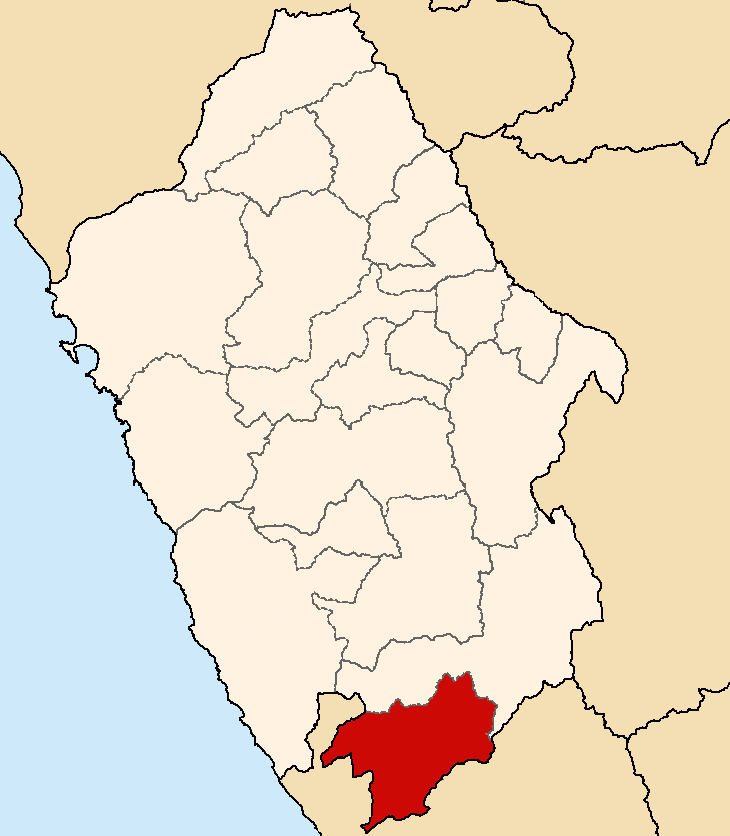
- Location of Ocros in the Ancash Region
- Country: Peru
- Region: Ancash
- Capital: Ocros

Area
  - Total: 2,286 km^{2} (883 sq mi)

Population
  - Total: 7,039
  - Density: 3.079/km^{2} (7.975/sq mi)
- Website: www.ocrosancashperu.com

Ocros is one of twenty provinces of the Ancash Region in Peru.

== Geography ==
Some of the highest mountains of the province are listed below:are listed below:

- Inka Waqanan
- Kushuru Punta
- Lukma Punta
- Maray Pampa
- Millishqucha
- Millpu
- Minaqucha
- Puka Mach'ay
- Puma Wayin
- Putaqa
- Shinwaqucha
- Uchku
- Urqu Pampa
- Wanaku
- Yuraq Punta

== Political division ==
Ocros is divided into ten districts, which are:

- Acas
- Cajamarquilla
- Carhuapampa
- Cochas
- Congas
- Llipa
- Ocros
- San Cristóbal de Rajan
- San Pedro
- Santiago de Chilcas

== See also ==
- Yanaqi - Qillqamarka
