= Gilia Gutiérrez =

Peruvian politician (born 1990)

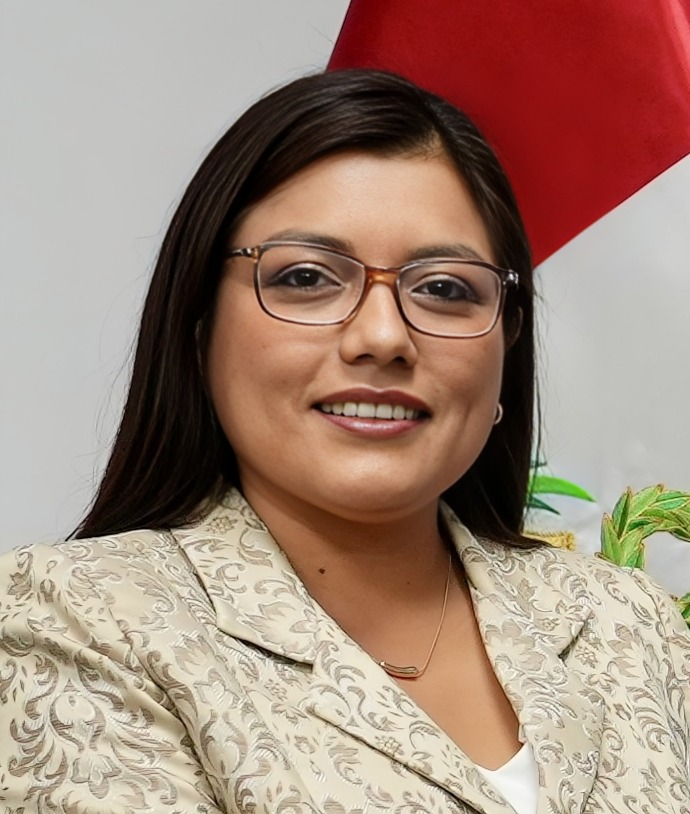

Governor of Moquegua
- Incumbent
- Assumed office 1 January 2023
- Preceded by: Zenón Cuevas

Personal details
- Born: 30 August 1990 (age 35)
- Party: Peru First (since 2024)

Gilia Ninfa Gutiérrez Ayala (born 30 August 1990) is a Peruvian politician serving as governor of Moquegua since 2023. From 2019 to 2020, she served as prefect of Moquegua.
