= Ocros District, Huamanga =

Coordinates: 13.3916°S 73.9180°W

Ocros
- District
- Interactive map of Ocros
- Country: Peru
- Region: Ayacucho
- Province: Huamanga
- Founded: July 15, 1936
- Capital: Ocros

Government
  - Mayor: Angel Hector Gutierrez De La Cruz

Area
  - Total: 194.67 km^{2} (75.16 sq mi)
- Elevation: 3,125 m (10,253 ft)

Population (2005 census)
  - Total: 5,853
  - Density: 30.07/km^{2} (77.87/sq mi)
- Time zone: UTC-5 (PET)
- UBIGEO: 050106

Ocros District is one of fifteen districts of the province Huamanga in Peru.

== Geography ==
One of the highest mountains of the district is Hatun Rumi at approximately 4,200 m (13,800 ft). Other mountains are listed below:

- Challwa Q'asa
- Hatun Tarayuq
- Qiwlla Pata
- Urqu Punta

== Ethnic groups ==
The people in the district are mainly indigenous citizens of Quechua descent. Quechua is the language which the majority of the population (81.69%) learnt to speak in childhood, 17.74% of the residents started speaking using the Spanish language (2007 Peru Census).
