= Ocros =

Ocros Town in Peru
- Village
- Nickname: El corazón de Perú
- Location within Peru
- Coordinates: 10°24′13″S 77°23′47″W
- Country: Peru
- Region: Ancash Region
- Province: Ocros Province
- District: Ocros

Government
  - Mayor: Amador Elias Barrenechea Cabanillas

Population
  - Total: 2,000

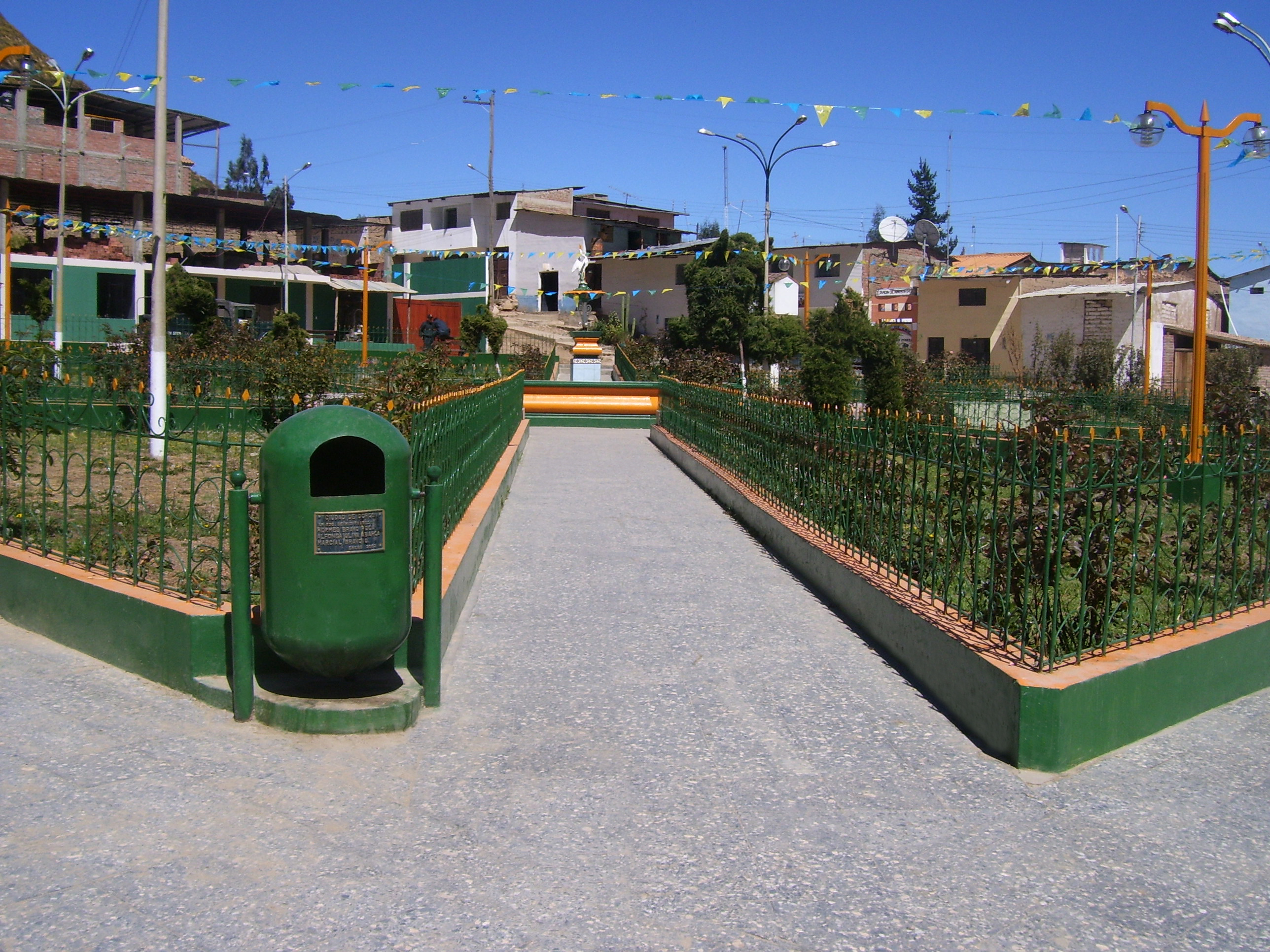
Plaza de Armas de Ocros in Ocros village

Ocros is a village in central Peru, capital of the Ocros District.
