= Koki Noriega =

Peruvian politician (born 1985)

Governor of Ancash
- Incumbent
- Assumed office 1 January 2023
- Preceded by: Henry Borja Cruzado

Personal details
- Born: 20 January 1985 (age 41)

Fabián Koki Noriega Brito (born 20 January 1985) is a Peruvian politician serving as governor of Ancash since 2023. He has served as president of the National Assembly of Regional Governments since 2025. From 2015 to 2018, he served as mayor of the Acochaca District.
