= Ocros District, Ocros =

Ocros
- District
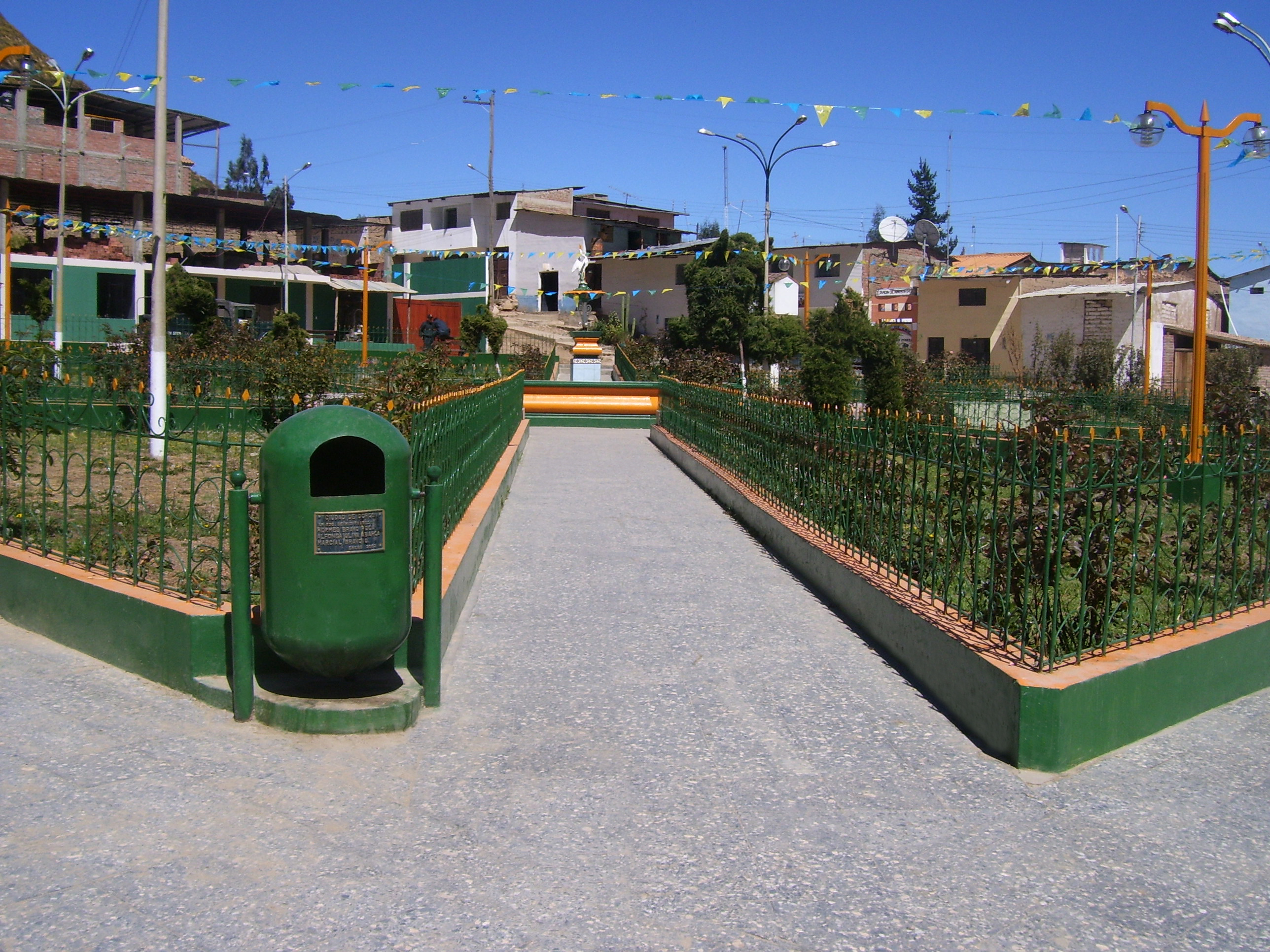
- Ocros

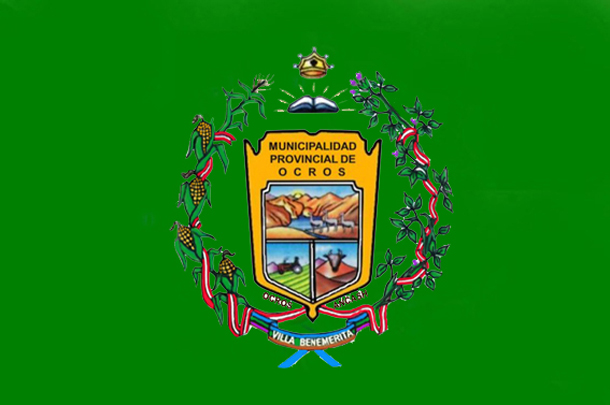
- Flag
- Interactive map of Ocros
- Coordinates: 10°24′00″S 77°23′46″W
- Country: Peru
- Region: Ancash
- Province: Ocros
- Capital: Ocros

Government
  - Mayor: Julio Alzamora Gomero

Area
  - Total: 230.55 km^{2} (89.02 sq mi)
- Elevation: 3,230 m (10,600 ft)

Population (2005 census)
  - Total: 1,539
  - Density: 6.675/km^{2} (17.29/sq mi)
- Time zone: UTC-5 (PET)
- UBIGEO: 021401
- Website: ocrosancashperu.com

Ocros District is one of 10 districts in the Ocros Province in Peru.

== Capital ==
Capital of the Ocros Province is the village of Ocros

== See also ==
- Lukma Punta
