= Department of Ancash =

Department in western Peru

Ancash Anqash (Quechua)
- Department
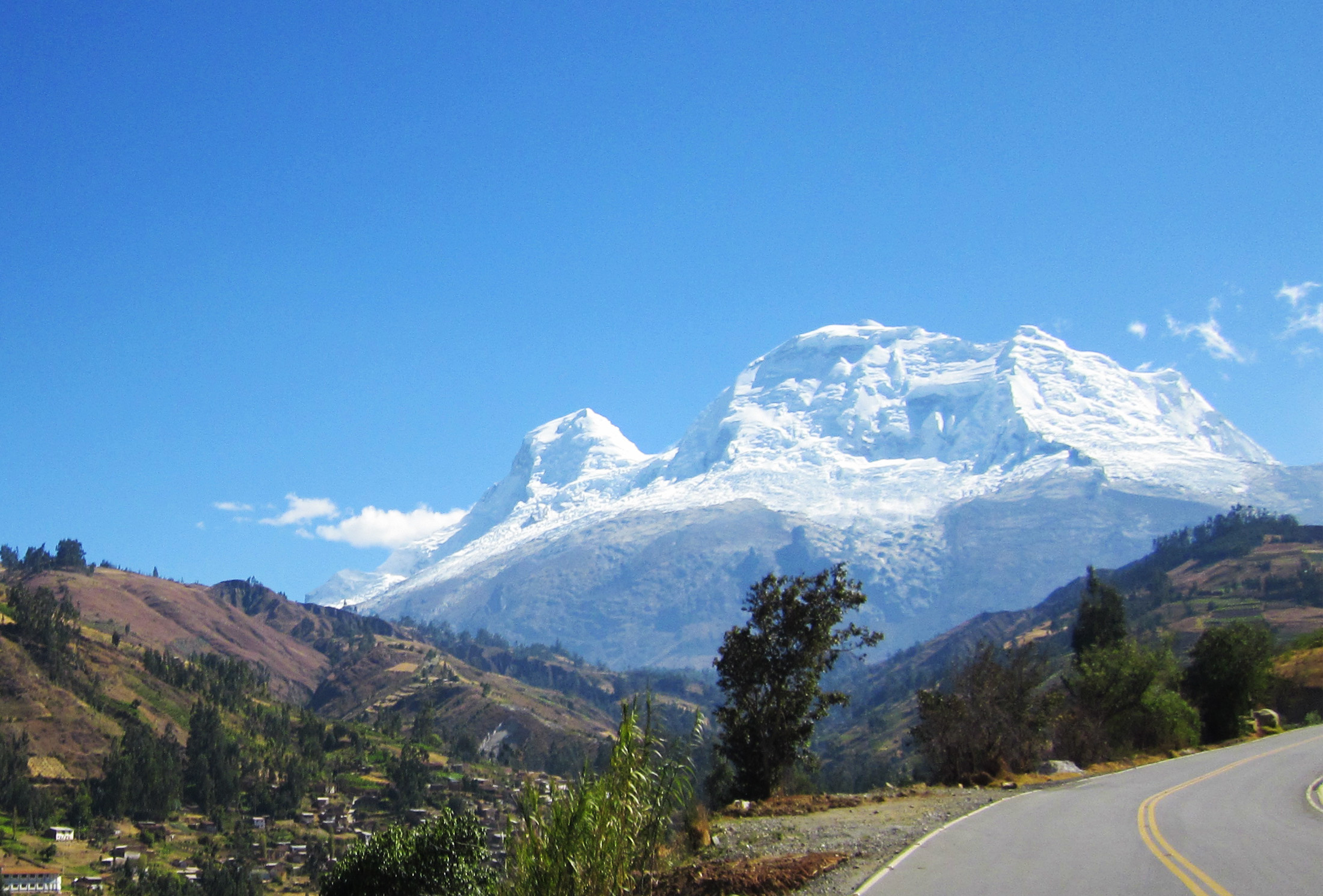
- Huascarán in the Huascaran National Park

- Flag Coat of arms

- Location of Ancash within Peru
- Coordinates: 9.53°S 77.53°W
- Country: Peru
- Capital: Huaraz
- Largest city: Chimbote
- Provinces: List: Aija; Antonio Raymondi; Asunción; Bolognesi; Carhuaz; Carlos Fermín Fitzcarrald; Casma; Corongo; Huaraz; Huari; Huarmey; Huaylas; Mariscal Luzuriaga; Ocros; Pallasca; Pomabamba; Recuay; Santa; Sihuas; Yungay

Government
  - Type: Regional Government
  - Governor: Koki Noriega
  - Senator: Nilza Chacón (FP)

Area
  - Total: 35,914.41 km^{2} (13,866.63 sq mi)
- Elevation (Capital): 3,052 m (10,013 ft)
- Highest elevation: 6,768 m (22,205 ft)
- Lowest elevation: 0 m (0 ft)

Population (2025)
  - Total: 1,205,998 ▲
  - Density: 33.57978/km^{2} (86.97123/sq mi)
- Demonym: ancashino/a
- UBIGEO: 02
- Dialing code: 043
- ISO 3166 code: PE-ANC
- Poverty rate: 21.5% ▼
- Percentage of Peru's GDP: 2.76%

Ancash (Quechua: Anqash; Spanish: Áncash pronounced [ˈaŋkaʃ]) is a department of Peru. Located in the country's west, it is bordered by the departments of La Libertad on the north, Huánuco and Pasco on the east, Lima on the south, and the Pacific Ocean on the west. It is administered by a regional government. Its capital is the city of Huaraz, and its largest city and port is Chimbote.

== Etymology ==
Its name originates from the Quechua word anqash ('light, of little weight'), from anqas ('blue') or from anka ('eagle').

== Geography ==
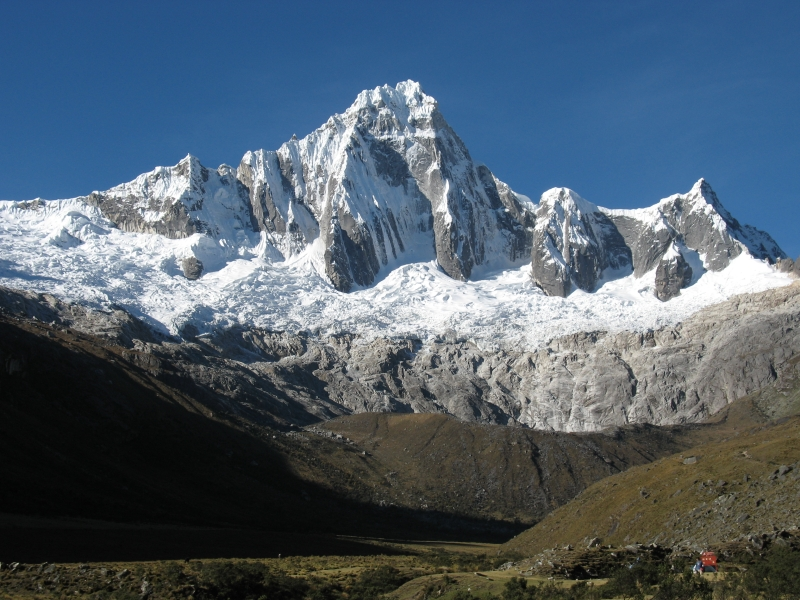
Tawllirahu in Ancash at 5,885 meters

Ancash is a land of contrasts: it features two great longitudinal valleys, which combine the mountain characteristics of the Callejón de Huaylas (Alley of Huaylas) with the sylvan ones of the Alto Marañón. Kilometres of sandy beaches and the blue waters of the Pacific. The territory of the coast, high plateaux and Andean punas of the department are flat, while the rest of the territory, in the Andes, is very rough. In the west, there are slopes with strong declivity form narrow canyons with abrupt and deserted sides.

The rough territory of the department is crossed by two mountain ranges: on the western side, the Cordillera Negra (Spanish for "black mountain range"), which has peaks without glaciers, and on the eastern side, the Cordillera Blanca ("white mountain range"), which has many peaks covered with snow and ice, such as the Huascarán and the Alpamayo. Between these two mountain ranges, the Santa River flows through the so-called Callejón de Huaylas. This valley narrows to form the Cañón del Pato ("duck canyon"). Also along the Pacific slopes, the Santa River has shaped a wide valley in the punas which narrows into the Cordillera Negra, where the Cañón del Pato canyon was formed.

The snow-covered peak of Huascarán, the highest peak of Peru and second of the Americas, reaches a height of 6,768 m (22,205 ft; 4.205 mi) and contrasts with the 6,263 m (20,548 ft) deep trough of Chimbote found in the ocean west of Ancash. Remnants of glaciers created many lakes such as Llanganuco Lakes and Lake Parón.

Following the Pan-American Highway north from Lima, the territory of the department begins just beyond the Fortress of Paramonga, between wide fields of sugarcane, and across the Fortaleza River, 206 kilometres (128 mi) from Lima.

Along the coast of Ancash, from the Fortaleza River to the Santa River, the Pacific exerts great influence. The Peruvian current and the El Niño current exert considerable and sometimes tragic effect on local lives and regional economies.

Normally, the Peruvian current, also known as the Humboldt Current, brings cold water and large numbers of fish. With the development of the shoals of anchoveta, the Ancash ports and creeks became commercial fishing centers. During the 1950s, the bay of Chimbote was the top fishing port of the world.

However, when warmer waters from the north, such as the current of El Niño, bring catastrophic rains to the coast and sea, the shoals of anchoveta disappear, leaving the fishing fleets plants paralysed, and flooding rivers cause serious damage to the lands and cities. The cycles of these two sea currents that affect Peru are hard to predict.

Further north along the Pan-American highway, numerous islands and islets dot the sea near the coast. Most are home only to guano seabirds. From south to north, the most important islands include Tortuga Island (Turtle Island), La Viuda Island (The Widow Island), Isla Blanca (White Island) and Santa Island (Holy Island).

The coastal region of Peru includes many peninsulas, creeks, warm bays and sand beaches, full of colour. Because of the lack of roads and difficult terrain, many of these are inaccessible by land. The most important beaches include Grande Beach, La Gramita Beach and Las Salinas Beach.

Much of this coast is a monotonous stretch of huge sand deserts, a common denominator in all Peruvian coastal regions because of the influence of the Humboldt Current.

Along the rivers, there are green valleys, cultivated mainly with sugarcane, rice and cotton. From south to north, the main rivers of the Ancash coast are the following: Huarmey, Culebras, Casma, Sechín, Nepeña, Lacramarca and Santa.

Of these rivers, the only one with water year-round is the Santa River. Its sources are the glaciers and lakes of the Cordillera Blanca. The other rivers, as with most rivers of the Peruvian coast, are intermittent, depending on the highland rains or the advance of El Niño.

== History ==
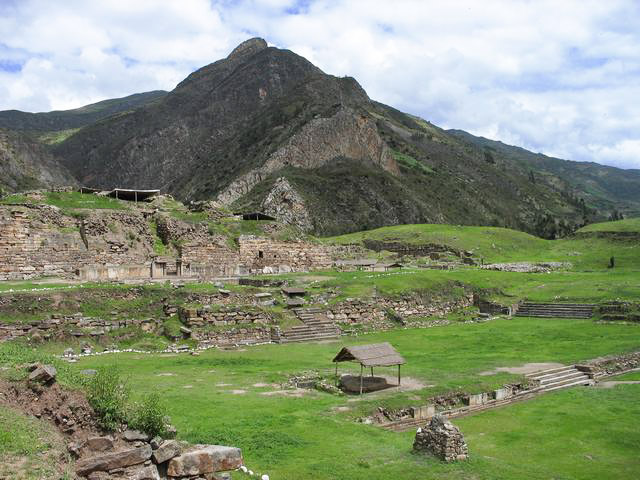
Chavín de Huantar

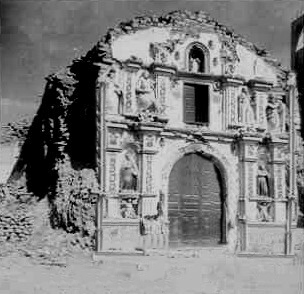
1970 Ancash earthquake

Between 400 and 600 BC, the first Peruvian civilization, known as Chavín, originated and flourished in this zone. The importance of this culture lies not only in its antiquity but in the history and culture it shares with other cultures along the Andean and Amazonian territories. As archaeologist Julio C. Tello put it, "Chavín was the mother of all the cultures that later bloomed in the old Peru." The name Chavín comes from the Quechua word Chawpin, which translates as center or headquarters. Tello believed that people came from the Amazonas, scaled the Andes, and developed the Chavín culture.

During the Inca age, the population of the Santa valley was assimilated into the Inca empire by Pachacuti.

The first Spaniards came to Huaylas attracted by the fame of the silver veins of the department. In time, the Spanish destroyed the Inca cities. It was during this time that Jerónimo de Alvarado founded the city of Huaraz. Though in the Colonial Age this city held little importance and its artistic and cultural life did not have much relevance, it became the headquarters for Simón Bolívar during his campaign to liberate Peru.

The department of Ancash was created following the defeat of the Peru-Bolivia Confederation by the combined forces of the Peruvian restoration army and the Chilean army at the battle of Yungay in 1839.

The 1970 Ancash earthquake devastated the department, killing more than 50,000 people and damaging 186,000 houses in one of the deadliest natural disasters in Peru.

Today, most of the Ancash population is concentrated in the Callejón de Huaylas.

Beginning in 2011, the department has been the site of an ongoing anti-mining protest over allegations of water contamination and public versus private rights to the natural resources of the zone. Clashes between protesters, mining company security, and the federal police have resulted in numerous deaths and injuries.

== Political division ==
Map of provinces

The department is divided into 20 provinces (provincias, singular: provincia), which comprise 166 districts (distritos, singular: distrito). Its capital is Huaraz. The provinces and their capitals are:

Province	Capital	District
Aija	Aija	5
Antonio Raymondi	Llamellín	6
Asunción	Chacas	2
Bolognesi	Chiquián	15
Carhuaz	Carhuaz	11
Carlos F. Fitzcarrald	San Luis	3
Casma	Casma	4
Corongo	Corongo	7
Huaraz	Huaraz	12
Huari	Huari	16
Huarmey	Huarmey	5
Huaylas	Caraz	10
Mariscal Luzuriaga	Piscobamba	8
Ocros	Ocros	10
Pallasca	Cabana	11
Pomabamba	Pomabamba	4
Recuay	Recuay	10
Santa	Chimbote	9
Sihuas	Sihuas	10
Yungay	Yungay	8

== Economy ==
The economy of Ancash, the third largest in Peru, is largely made up of gold, copper and zinc mining. Its coast is rich in fishing resources and it is the most productive fishing region of Peru (Peru is the world's largest exporter of fish meal). Crops cultivated in Ancash include potatoes, wheat and barley.

== Demographics ==
=== Population growth ===
Census year	Population
1981	862,380
1993	983,546
2007	1,164,450
2017	1,139,115
2025	1,205,998

=== Languages ===
According to the 2007 Peru Census, the language learnt first by most of the residents was Spanish (68.34%) followed by Quechua (31.36%). The Quechua variety spoken in Ancash is Ancash Quechua. The following table shows the results concerning the language learnt first in the Department of Ancash by province:

Province	Quechua	Aymara	Asháninka	Another native language	Spanish	Foreign language	Deaf or mute	Total
Aija	2,807	3	-	4	4,623	-	8	7,445
Antonio Raymondi	12,073	17	-	19	3,694	5	34	15,842
Asunción	6,854	3	-	24	1,564	27	36	8,508
Bolognesi	4,473	19	6	87	24,374	10	29	28,998
Carhuaz	30,365	40	2	17	10,971	11	38	41,444
C.F Fitzcarrald	17,956	16	1	2	1,709	-	77	19,761
Casma	5,517	29	2	13	34,299	6	42	39,908
Corongo	745	-	-	2	7,128	-	14	7,889
Huaraz	50,570	116	12	37	88,410	133	99	139,377
Huari	45,830	59	6	32	12,619	9	166	58,721
Huarmey	1,695	10	2	7	24,521	2	14	26,251
Huaylas	28,772	18	5	4	21,422	7	69	50,297
M. Luzuriaga	19,687	19	1	1	1,841	1	95	21,645
Ocros	734	4	2	-	7,932	2	12	8,686
Pallasca	84	1	5	49	26,958	4	46	27,147
Pomabamba	22,061	16	1	1	3,875	2	51	26,007
Recuay	6,587	13	1	1	11,450	4	28	18,084
Santa	9,005	105	36	274	365,507	138	365	375,430
Sihuas	10,520	13	1	4	17,965	1	60	28,564
Yungay	37,806	30	2	4	13,678	10	126	51,656
Total	314,141	531	85	582	684,540	372	1,409	1,001,660
%	31.36	0.05	0.01	0.06	68.34	0.04	0.14	100.00

=== Ethnicity ===
Ethnicity in Ancash (2017)
1. Mestizo (54.9%)
2. Quechua (35.3%)
3. White people (5.90%)
4. Afro-Peruvian (3.20%)
5. Other (0.70%)

Most of the population identifies Mestizo or Quechua.

Ethnicity in Ancash (2017)
Ethnicity	Percentage	Number
Mestizo	54.9%	478,312
Quechua	35.3%	307,965
White	5.9%	51,268
Afro-Peruvian	3.2%	27,953
Other	0.7%	5,671
Aymara	Negligible	852

=== Religion ===
Religion in Ancash (2017)
Religion	Percentage	Number
Catholicism	76.9%	686,511
Evangelical	15.5%	138,659
Irreligious	4.6%	41,411
Other	3%	26,641

=== Literacy ===
As of 2017, 85.3% (923,542) of the population is literate and 14.7% (158,839) of the population is illiterate.

== Toponyms ==
Many of the toponyms of the Department of Ancash originate from Quechua. In and around the Cordillera Blanca, in provinces like Huaylas and Yungay, these names are overwhelmingly predominant. Their Spanish-based orthography, however, is in conflict with the normalized alphabet of the language. According to Article 20 of Decreto Supremo No 004-2016-MC (Supreme Decree) which approves the Regulations to Law 29735, published in the state-owned newspaper El Peruano on 22 July 2016, adequate spellings of the toponyms in the normalised alphabets of the indigenous languages must progressively be proposed with the aim of standardizing the namings used by the National Geographic Institute (Instituto Geográfico Nacional, IGN). The National Geographic Institute realizes the necessary changes in the official maps of Peru.

Contrarily to intentions to replace indigenous toponyms by other names like Santa Cruz or Contrahierbas, the Ministry of Culture proposes to the municipalities of the provinces to recover ancient indigenous toponyms and that these names should be spread by the local and communal authorities on posters and other signage.

== Tourism ==
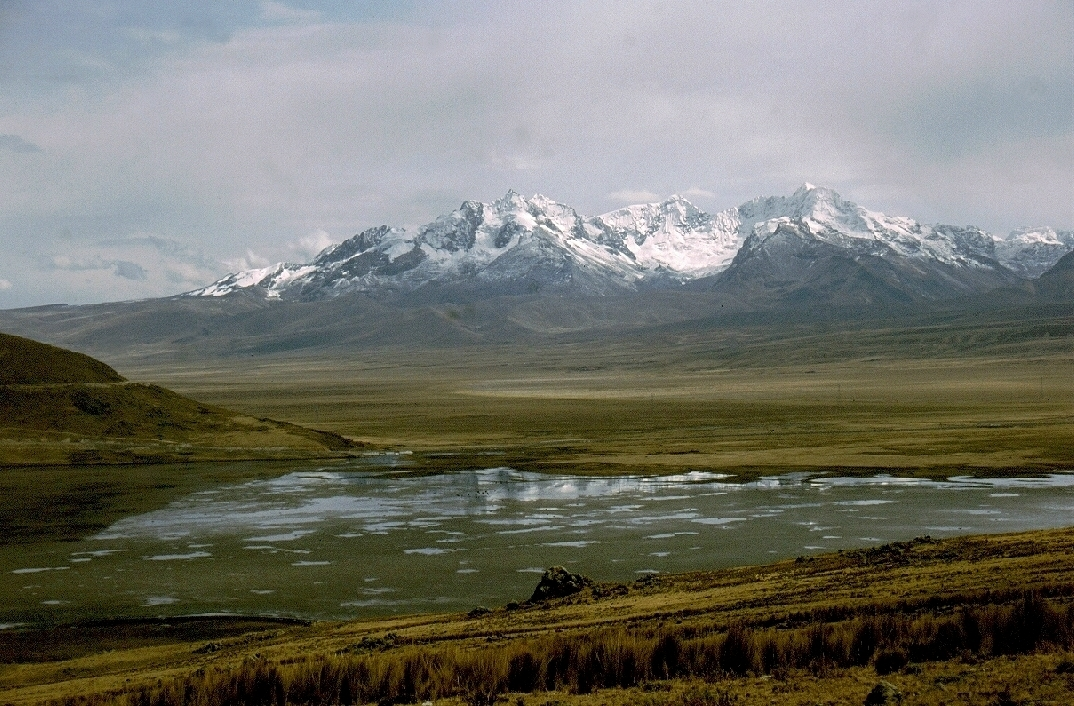
Lake Conococha

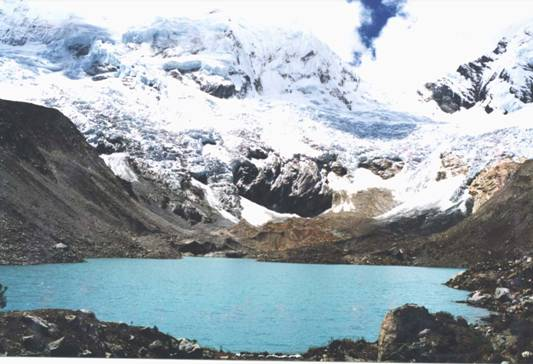
Lake Palcacocha

The geographical centre of Ancash, the Callejón de Huaylas, is an area of intense interest to tourists. This is due to its large variety of natural attractions, its sport and recreational facilities, and the nearby archaeological remains of the ancient cultures that once flourished there. The Cordillera Blanca offers an interesting attraction for tourists visiting Peru. Visitors also come to see the natural beauty of the area's glaciers and valleys and to enjoy the many lakes and thermal fountains.

Ancash is sometimes referred to as the "Switzerland of Peru". There is the four mile high Huascarán, home to the Huascarán National Park. There is also the Alpamayo peak, considered one of the most beautiful in the world.

Among archaeological sites of interest, Ancash has many vestiges of old cultures, including the Guitarrero Cave (10,000 BC), the pre-Columbian ruins of Chavín de Huantar, Hunsakay, Willkawayin, Sechín, and Pañamarka are also well-known.

=== Tours ===
There are a few tours in the Department of Ancash that will let us know the main touristic and historical places of the zone. Among the principal ones are:

- Huaraz – Recuay – Catac – Pachaqutu ravine and Pastururi.
- Yungay – Llankanuku – Vaquería – Waripampa – Santa Cruz and Caraz
- Caraz, Cañon del Pato
- Huaraz – Pitiq – Qillqay and Juanca
- Caraz, Puya Raimondi at Mirador de Huinchus
- Huaraz – Olleros – Yanashallash – Chavín de Huantar – Qiruqucha and Catac
- Caraz, Parun Lake
- Catac and Carpa
- Huaraz – Willkawayin and Llaqa ravine
- Chacas – Perlilla
- Chacas – Huari

=== Pativilca-Caraz-Huallanca route ===
The historical village Pativilca (Lima Region), where Simón Bolívar planned his expedition for the liberation of Peru, lies 202 kilometres (126 mi) north of Lima on the Pan-American Highway. At this point begins the highway that leads to the Callejón de Huaylas. This road is completely paved, although it often had to be repaired because of the extreme damage caused by the huaycos (flash floods) and the rains. The same problem affects most Peruvian roads, especially the ones in the mountains (Quechua natural region and rainforest Rupa-Rupa natural region).

This highway is 287 kilometres (178 mi) long, with an extremely comfortable course, especially in the steep climbing stretches through the Cordillera Negra (Black Range) up to the summit of Conococha, 4,100 metres (13,451 ft) above sea level. From there, the road descends toward the Callejón de Huaylas.

The trip Lima-Huaraz-Caraz of 468 kilometres (254 mi) takes seven hours by car. Modern buses spend eight hours over the same stretch.

East of Pativilca, for about 20 kilometres (12 mi) the highway passes between wide fields planted with sugarcane in extensive fields, parallel to the Fortaleza River bed.

At the town Huaricanga the road enters the department of Ancash. At this point, the highway begins a slow ascent of the first spurs of the Cordillera Negra. This stretch continues for about 50 kilometres (31 mi). The climb gets suddenly steeper beyond the towns Chasquitambo and Chaucayán, with many bends and serpentines.

=== Cordillera Blanca ===
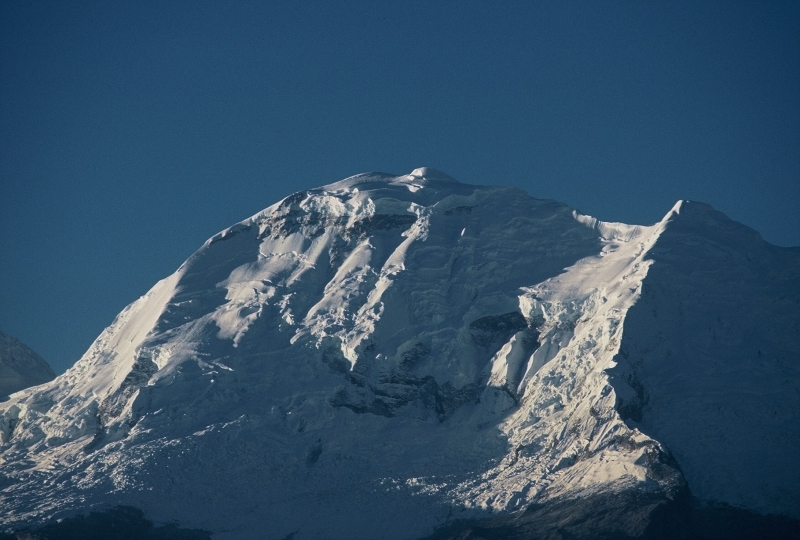
Huascarán, the highest summit in Peru

This mountain range is composed by gigantic summits covered with snow, which are among the most beautiful of the world. The White mountain range is considered the highest tropical mountain range in the world. It borders the Callejón de Huaylas to the east. It has a length of 180 km (110 mi).

It has 35 peaks that are higher than 6,000 m and many other smaller ones, creating a variety of summits with different grades of difficulty in climbing.

This mountain range was called White, not only for its eternal snow but also for the chemical constitution of its quartz and feldspar rocks. It has the highest summit in Peru and the fifth one in America after Aconcagua, Ojos del Salado, Bonete and Mercedario: Huascarán, whose south peak reaches 6,768 m (22,205 ft). Huascarán's north peak reaches 6655 m.

Alpamayo whose height has been estimated in 5,947 m, has been considered as "the most beautiful snow mountain of the world". This statement was achieved by the distinguished Peruvian mountaineer César Morales Arnao who sent the photo of Alpamayo to the world contest of scenic beauty made in 1966 in Munich, Germany.

Huandoy N reaches 6,395 m, Huantsán reaches 6410 m, Chopicalqui reaches 6354 m, Copa N reaches 6173 m, Artesonraju reaches 6025 m, Santa Cruz S reaches 6,259 m and Hualcán reaches 6,126 m.

The beauty of the Cordillera Blanca is largely determined by the Cordillera Negra because this mountain range softens the winds that come from the Pacific Ocean. The Cordillera Negra, acting as a shield, avoids the thaw of the big glaciers from the Cordillera Blanca.

The Cordillera Negra has rocky peaks with very little winter snowfall, reaching a maximum height of 5500 m. Its name comes from the comparison with the white snowy peaks of the Cordillera Blanca.

=== Huascarán National Park ===
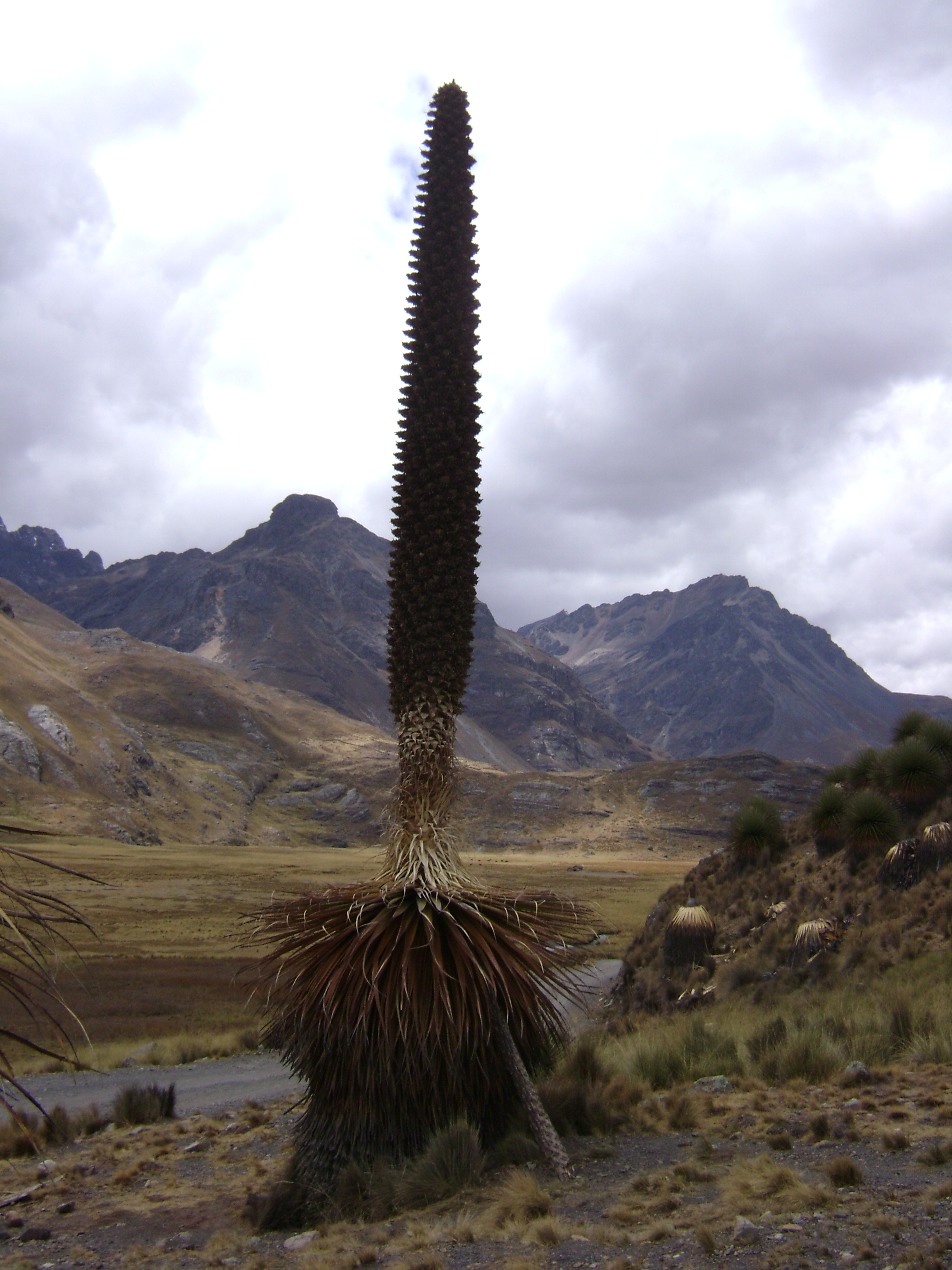
The Puya raimondii, a gigantic inflorescence, unique to Peru and Bolivia

The Huascarán National Park is one of the most outstanding conservation parks in Peru, due to its landscapes that are full of peaks, lakes, canyons, torrents and waterfalls. Inside its borders, it can be observed the whole Cordillera Blanca and seven peaks of more than 6000 m height. They constitute one of the main international focuses for climbers and mountaineers. It was stated as a National Park on July 1, 1975, with a surface of 340,000 ha and a length of 158 km (98 mi). This National Park includes parts of the following provinces: Recuay, Huaraz, Carhuaz, Yungay, Huaylas, Pomabamba, Mariscal Luzuriaga, Huari, Corongo, Sihuas and Bolognesi. This park has also been listed as a biosphere reservation and as a World Heritage Site by UNESCO.

The park territory is very uneven. It has snowy summits, which altitudes vary between 5000 and 6768 MSL. It also has gullies, that are deeply encased because of the fluvioglacial erosion, and a great number of lagoons. Inside the borders of the park, there are 663 glaciers that are distributed throughout 180 km, from the Tuku in the south up to the Champara in the north.

Regarding its climate, there are two very well defined seasons: The dry season from April to September becoming worse between the months of June and August and the wet season from October to May whose highest rainfall is between January and March.

Its flora includes important groups of Puya Raimondi. In its fauna, there are tarucas, spectacled bears, vicuñas, pumas, foxes, vizcachas, weasels, Andean mountain cats, opossums, hog-nosed skunks, etc.

There is also a great number of birds, predominantly ducks, American coots and hummingbirds.

=== Cordillera Negra ===
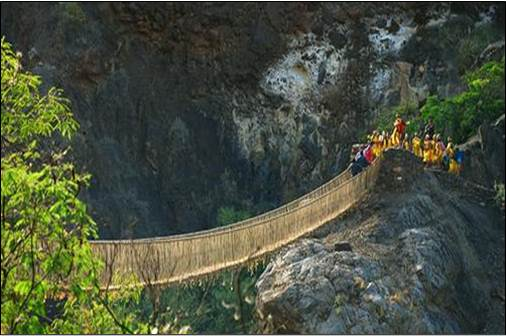
Inca Bridge Pukayaku

The route Casma-Huaraz is not a very highly travelled road. The highway begins with a paved path that arrives up to Yaután. Then it quickly begins to ascend through an unpaved path by the sides of the Cordillera Negra, following the course of the Casma River. This route becomes more steep once it arrives to Pariacoto. Along the road, there are not important towns at all, except for Pira that offers some traveler's services.

This route, extremely steep and narrow, goes between big abysses and gullies. It can be seen small rural districts with chacras (smallholdings) that have been sown with potatoes, wheat, barley and other food products. It can also be seen livestock and a lot of human activity.

The gullies of the Cordillera Negra -that goes, simultaneously, with the Cordillera Blanca throughout 150 km- are gloomy and dark. Most of them are dry or their flow is scarce. From north to south, there are some hills like Rumicruz (5,020 m), Rocarre (5,187 m), Cerro Rico (5,015 m), and Chunta (4,810 m).

The beauty of the Cordillera Blanca is largely determined by the Cordillera Negra because this mountain range soften the winds that come from the Pacific Ocean. The Cordillera Negra acts like a shield and avoids the thaw of the big glaciers that are located in the Cordillera Blanca.

The Cordillera Negra has rocky peaks with very little winter snow, reaching a maximum height of 5,500 m. Its name comes from the comparison with the white snowy peaks of the Cordillera Blanca.

=== Extreme sports ===
Extreme sports in the Callejón de Huaylas and the Huascarán National Park:

- Mountaineering: the glaciers of the Cordillera Blanca constitute one of the most important world scenarios for ice climbing. Mountaineering can be practiced the whole year but the weather is best between the months of May and September.
- Trekking: the prehispanic paths offer excellent opportunities for trekking during the whole year. On the way, it can be observed varied flora, fauna, impressive snowy mountains, gullies and deep canyons, archaeological sites and several typical villages. There are several routes that last from one day to three weeks.
- Camping: it is a pleasant and a relaxing experience to spend the night under the moonlight, having as a unique companion: the stars and some constellations like Capricornus, Crux, Centaurus and others. This sport can be practiced at any time of the year.
- Canoeing: the Santa River has the technical characteristics and different difficulty grades for practicing river sports as canoeing, kayak and others. For example, there are some rapids between Anta and Caraz that are good for those who are just beginning to practice this sport. The lakes Llankanuku and Qiruqucha also offer some special characteristic for a boat ride.
- Cycling: the cyclists that ride on the highways and roads enjoy the practice of this sport by traveling inside and outside the Huascarán National Park. This sport can be practiced at any time of the year. The north area, near Caraz, offers the best rides, single tracks and down hill tracks.
- Rock climbing: the granite belt that goes round the glaciers of the Cordillera Blanca constitutes the suitable place for practicing this sport. There are walls from 100 m to 1000 m of height that have many kinds of technical difficulties to get through. There is an odd scenario for this sport called Rocódromo de Monterrey.
- Alpine skiing: it consists on slipping from the glaciers. The most favorable ones for practicing this sport are: Pastururi, Copa, Wallqan, Huascarán, Wallunarahu and Perlilla, the latter being recently discovered and promoted by the local government of the Asunción Province, with 6 km (3.7 mi) of moderate and steep slopes where competitions were held soon snowboarding and alpine skiing. These snowcapped mountains are ideal for practicing the slide on snow (also known as siquiesqui) and for making snowmen.
- Paragliding – Hang gliding: along the Callejón de Huaylas there are several places that are favourable for the practice of these flight sports. They can be practiced at any time of the year.
- Horse riding: it is a sport of big emotions. It is practiced on bridle paths with Peruvian horses that were raised in the Callejón de Huaylas.
- Fishing: the rod fishing of trout can be practiced in rivers and lagoons of the Cordillera Blanca and Cordillera Negra at any time of the year.

=== Santa River and the Cañón del Pato ===
From Chimbote to Huallanca, there are approximately 140 km (87 mi). This unpaved and very little travelled highway is a provisional line over the embankment of the old railroad. This railway and several tunnels were destroyed by the catastrophe of 1970.

The highway, outside Chimbote, goes through the wide flat and fertile embankments of the Santa valley and it continuous its course up to Huallanca.

From Chuquicara, the highway becomes narrower. The Chuquicara River is a major right-hand tributary of the Santa River. Its waters are black because they contain abundant coal sediments proceeding from the heights of Pallasca.

From Huallanca, it is possible to travel through the Cañón del Pato. This canyon is one of the many canyons that are along the 370 km (230 mi) of the Santa River. The Santa River has its source in the lake Conococha. This river is the most important river in the coast, because its annual water mass is 6100 million m^{3}. As centuries went by, it has formed a narrow pass of 2000 m of altitude in the Cordillera Negra.

In this place, the waters turn into whirlpools and rapids before going out from a narrow gorge of 500 m that is called Cañón del Pato (Duck Canyon). This waterfall constitutes the source of hydroelectric energy in the power station of the Cañón del Pato, in Huallanca.

From Huallanca, it is possible to enter the Callejón de Huaylas by the highway that goes to Caraz. It is also a way to enter the Callejón de Conchucos (Conchucos valley).

=== Callejón de Conchucos ===
The Callejón de Conchucos is a beautiful succession of valleys located to the east of the Cordillera Blanca. It is connected by a highway from Catac to Huallanca.

There are eight provinces of the Ancash Region that cover the Callejón de Conchucos. They are Huari, Asunción, Antonio Raymondi, Mariscal Luzuriaga, Pomabamba, Sihuas, Corongo and Pallasca. This Callejón is located to the east of the Cordillera Blanca, that is to say, to the other side of the Callejón de Huaylas, before the Marañón River.

The topography of the soil presents high summits, deep valleys and inhospitable punas, making it a rough zone, such as most of the highland in Peru.

The northern provinces of Pallasca Province and Corongo Province have their own direct access towards Chimbote and the Callejón de Huaylas. The other provinces have a longitudinal highway of double entry, one from Huari Province and the other one from Huallanca District and Sihuas Province, joining Pomabamba Province, Mariscal Luzuriaga Province and Antonio Raymondi Province.

== Transportation ==
Five main highways cross the department:

- The North Pan-American highway, that crosses the coast of Ancash longitudinally.
- Three east–west highways that connect the coast with the region of the highlands, most importantly the Callejón de Huaylas:
  - Pativilca – Huaraz – Caraz – Huallanca
  - Nepeña – Pamparumas – Caraz
  - Huarmey – Aija – Recuay
  - Casma – Huaraz
  - Chimbote – Huallanca – Caraz
- One highway that crosses the Callejón de Conchucos (Conchucos Alley) longitudinally, to the east of the Cordillera Blanca.

In addition, the region has a network of local roads.

== Additional facts ==
Weather	Warm and semitropical
Temperature	Annual average 16.2 °C (61.2 °F)
Road network	4,429 kilometres (2,752 mi)
Illiteracy rate	4.7%
Child mortality rate	43 per thousand
Distances	Caraz to Lima, 468 kilometres (291 mi); Caraz to Trujillo, 295 kilometres (183 mi); Huaraz to Cajamarca, 636 kilometres (395 mi)

== Notable people ==
- Santiago Antúnez de Mayolo, physicist, engineer and mathematician

== See also ==
- Tourism in Peru
