= Quilcayhuanca =

Valley in the Ancash Region in Peru

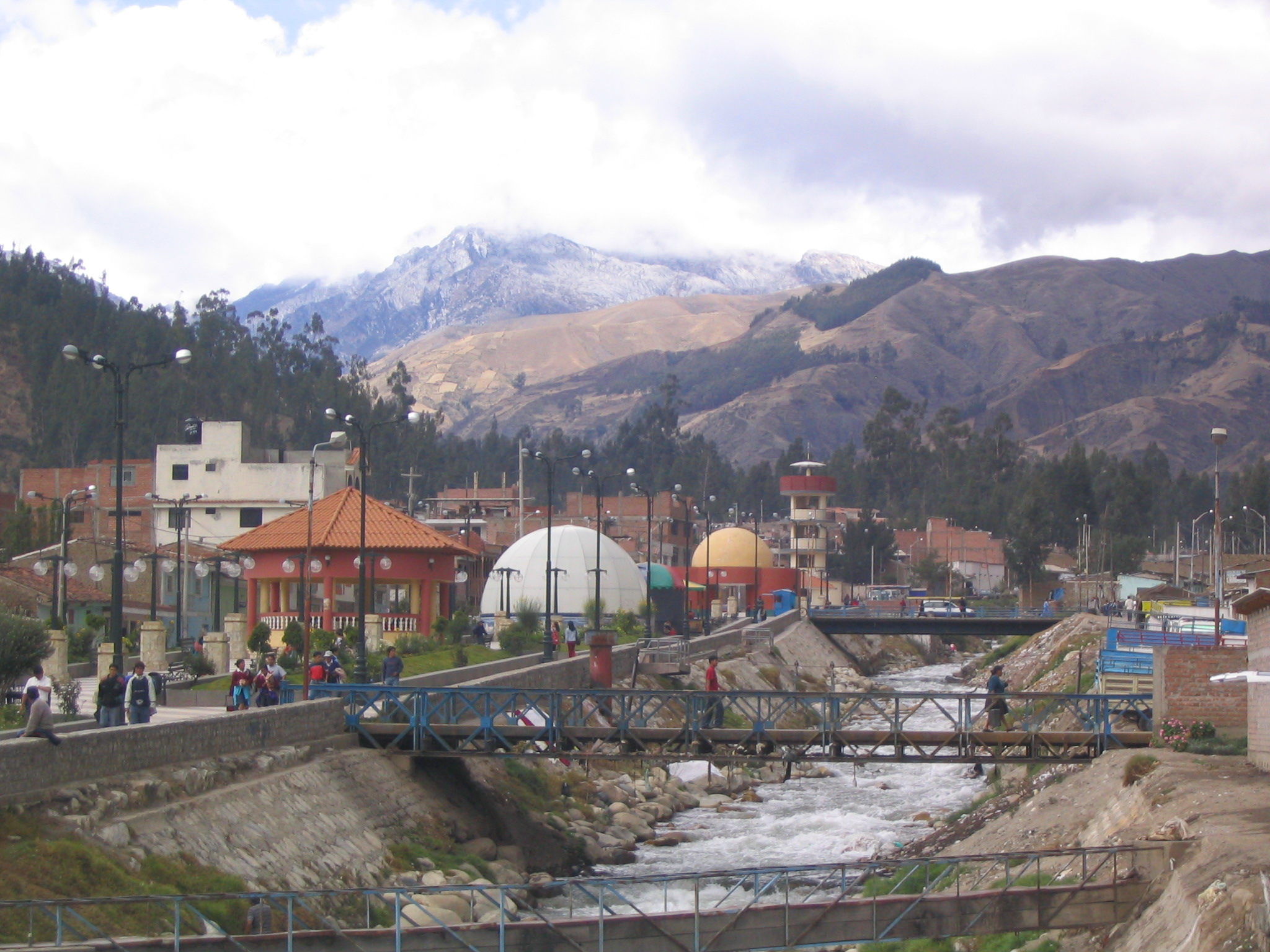
- Quilcay River in Huaraz
- Etymology: Quechua

Location
- Country: Peru
- Region: Ancash Region

Physical characteristics
- Mouth: Santa River

Quilcayhuanca (possibly from Quechua qillqay to write, wank'a rock, possibly "rock with inscriptions"), Quillcay, Quilcay or Qelkaywanka is a river in the Ancash Region in Peru. It is a right affluent of the Santa River.

The river originates in the Cordillera Blanca west of Tullparaju near the lake Tullpaqucha. Its direction is to the southwest. It flows along the border of the districts Independencia and Huaraz in the Huaraz Province. From the point of the confluence with the Paria River in the east of the town Huaraz it receives the name Quillcay. Now canalized, the river crosses the town from east to west along the border of the suburb El Centenario, until emptying into Santa River in the west side of town.

The Quilcayhuanca valley is located inside Huascarán National Park. It is one of the tourist attractions of the Huaraz Province with views of snow-capped mountains (like Andavite, Churup, Pucaranra, Chinchey and Tullparaju) and visits to glacial lakes and rock paintings.
