= João Garcia =

Portuguese mountaineer

Personal information
- Nationality: Portuguese
- Born: João José Silva Abranches Garcia; 11 June 1967 (age 59) Lisbon, Portugal

Climbing career
- Type of climber: Mountaineer
- Major ascents: Mount Everest, Annapurna
- Known for: Completing Seven Summits

João José Silva Abranches Garcia (born 11 June 1967 in Lisbon, Portugal) is a mountaineer in Portugal. His main professional activities are as organizer and guide in mountaineering expeditions. On 18 May 1999 he became the first Portuguese man to reach the summit of Mount Everest, without the use of supplementary oxygen. Three years later, in 2002, he published a book, A Mais Alta Solidão (The Highest Loneliness), in which he describes his experiences in mountain climbing, namely his 1999 expedition to Everest, where he endured bitter adversities. Nevertheless, João Garcia continued to climb and on the 17th April 2010, he summited Annapurna without the aid of supplemental oxygen, becoming the 10th man of all time to climb all 14 eight-thousanders without bottled oxygen or Sherpas.

== Biography ==
Born in the Portuguese capital Lisbon, João Garcia started practicing mountaineering in 1982 (15 years old), when he travelled to Serra da Estrela by bicycle to practice rock climbing with “Clube de Montanhismo da Guarda” (CMG) (Guarda mountaineering club). In the following year he started ice climbing. In 1984 he went on an expedition to the Alps with CMG, having ascended to Mont Blanc for the first time. The following years he climbed several other summits in the Alps.

In the meantime he practiced triathlon which helped him acquire the necessary physical strength to succeed in mountain climbing.

In 1993 he started his activities in the Himalayas, as part of an international Polish expedition (led by Krzysztof Wielicki) to Cho Oyu, in Tibet. The ascent was performed by a new route and without the aid of supplementary oxygen. Since then he ascended several Himalayan mountains including all the fourteen eight-thousanders.

On 18 May 1999 he became the first Portuguese person to climb Mount Everest (8848m) by its north face route, again without using supplementary oxygen. During the descent his partner Pascal Debrouwer from Belgium, fell to his death. Due to the harsh weather, João Garcia suffered from severe frostbite in his fingers and face, leading him to spend some time in a hospital in Zaragoza, Spain, where he had a part of his fingers amputated.

In June/July 2000 he visited Peru with a party from CAB (Club Alpin Belge), climbing Urus, Ishinca, Tocllaraju, ad Chopicalqui.

During his 2005 Lhotse ascent, his partner Hélder Santos was forced to abandon the summit attempt due to food poisoning. Still, he climbed in great style, having reached the summit alone.

In 2006 he started the project "À conquista dos Picos do Mundo" (Conquering the world's peaks), where he aspires to climb (without supplementary oxygen and between 2006 and 2010), eight of the fourteen eight-thousanders, hoping to finish the fourteen summits by 2010. His first quest was Kanchenjunga, which he summitted on 22 May 2006, along with Ivan Vallejo from Ecuador.

Still in 2006, João led a Portuguese expedition to Shishapangma (8027m), which included the mountaineers Bruno Carvalho, Hélder Santos, Rui Rosado and Ana Santos. The journalist Aurélio Faria has followed part of the expedition. João, Bruno and Rui reached the summit on 31 October. Tragically, Bruno fell to his death during the descent.

On 20 July 2007, João reached the summit of K2, the second-highest mountain in the world, completing his ninth ascent of a mountain over 8,000 meters. Multiple expeditions collaborated during the summit push. João completed the climb without using supplemental oxygen.

On 20 May 2008 João reached the summit of Makalu (8,462 m), his 10th eight-thousander. After considerable logistic complications in the Everest region due to the mayhem caused by the Olympic flame trip to the roof of the world, João reached base camp late in the season and ended up summiting alone, under strong wind.

On 18 July 2008 João summitted Broad Peak (8,051 m), his 11th eight-thousander.

On 28 April 2009 he reached the summit of Manaslu (8,163 m) after yet another difficult climb. He was joined by four members of a Korean expedition while most climbers involved in the summit push were forced to go back due to exhaustion and unfavorable climbing conditions.
On 10 July 2009 João summitted Nanga Parbat (8,126 m), his 13th eight-thousander.

He summited Annapurna (8,091 m) on 17 April 2010. With this accomplishment he has reached the summit of all the 14 eight-thousanders and become one of the few mountaineers to achieve this without the use of supplementary oxygen.

João Garcia has also climbed the Seven Summits (the highest mountains of each of the seven continents): Mount Everest (Asia), Aconcagua (South America), Denali (North America), Elbrus (Europe), Vinson Massif (Antarctica), Kilimanjaro (Africa) and Mount Kosciuszko (Australia).

Nowadays, João Garcia is the only Portuguese high altitude and extreme conditions cameraman, having directed several documentaries about his expeditions, most of them broadcast on Portuguese television. He is the author of the book “A Mais Alta Solidão” (The Highest Loneliness), having sold more than 30 thousand copies; and “Mais Além – Depois do Evereste” (Further – Beyond Everest), published in February 2007, and dedicated to the memory of Bruno Carvalho.

== Peaks ==
1984

- Aiguille Argentiere, France (3879m)
- Mont Maudit, France-Italy (4465m)
- Mont Blanc, France-Italy (4810m)

1985

- Mont Blanc du Tacul, France (4248m)
- Mont Blanc, France-Italy (4810m)
- Aiguille du Midi, France(3800m)

1986-1992

- Many climbs in the Alps and Pyrinees;

1993

- Matterhorn, Switzerland-Italy (4478m)
- Cho Oyu, Nepal (8201m)
- Shishapangma South, Tibet (8013m) (attempt)

1994

- Jbel Toubkal, Morocco (4167m)
- Dhaulagiri, Nepal (8167m)

1995

- Denali, Alaska (6194m) (attempt)
- Mont Blanc, France-Italy (4810m)

1996

- Nanga Parbat, Pakistan (8125m) (attempt)
- Aconcagua, Argentina (6959m)

1997

- Mount Everest, Nepal-Tibet (8844m) (attempt)
- Mont Blanc, France-Italy (4810m)
- Island Peak, Nepal (6160m)
- Ama Dablam, Nepal (6812m)
- Aconcagua, Argentina (6959m)

1998

- Mount Everest, Nepal-Tibet (8848m) (attempt)
- Gokio Peak, Nepal (5483m)
- Mont Blanc, France-Italy (4810m)

1999

- Mount Everest, Nepal-Tibet (8848m)
- Aconcagua, Argentina (6959m)

2000

- Urus, Peru (5495m)
- Ishinca, Peru (5530m)
- Tuqllarahu, Peru (6032m)
- Chopicalqui, Peru (6354m)
- Dent Blanche, Switzerland (4324m)
- Aconcagua, Argentina (6959m)

2001

- Gasherbrum II, China-Pakistan (8035m)
- Mont Blanc, France-Italy (4810m)

2002

- Aconcagua, Argentina (6959m) (summit two times in two days)
- Pumori, Nepal-Tibet (7161m)
- McKinley, Alaska, U.S. (6194m)
- Shishapangma, Tibet (8013m) (attempt)

2003

- Aconcagua, Argentina (6959m) (summit 6th time)
- Pumori, Nepal-Tibet (7161m) (summit for the 2nd time along with 5 Portuguese friends)
- Elbrus, Russia (4741m) (2nd time)
- Mont Blanc, France-Italy (4810m) (24th time)
- Himlung Himal, Nepal (7167m)
- Vinson Massif, Antarctica (4897m)

2004

- Aconcagua, Argentina (6962m) (summit 7th time)
- Ama Dablam, Nepal (6812m) (Ex Leader, summit for the 2nd time, 4 Portuguese friends)
- Gasherbrum I, China-Pakistan (8080m) (summit with 1 friend) - the 11th 8000
- Mont Blanc, France-Italy (4810m) (2 more times)
- Monte Cervino (Matterhorn or Mont Cervin), France-Italy-Switzerland (4478m)
- Imja Tse (or Island Peak), Khumbu-Nepal (6160m)

2005

- Lhotse, Nepal (8516m)
- Mount Kilimanjaro, Tanzania (5895m)

2006

- Kangchenjunga, Nepal-India (8586m)
- Shishapangma, Tibet (8027m)

2007

- K2, Pakistan (8611m)

2008

- Makalu, Nepal-Tibet (8485m)
- Broad Peak, China-Pakistan (8051m)

2009

- Manaslu, Nepal (8163m)
- Nanga Parbat, Pakistan (8126m)

2010

- Annapurna, Nepal (8091m)
