= Tullparaju =

Mountain in Peru

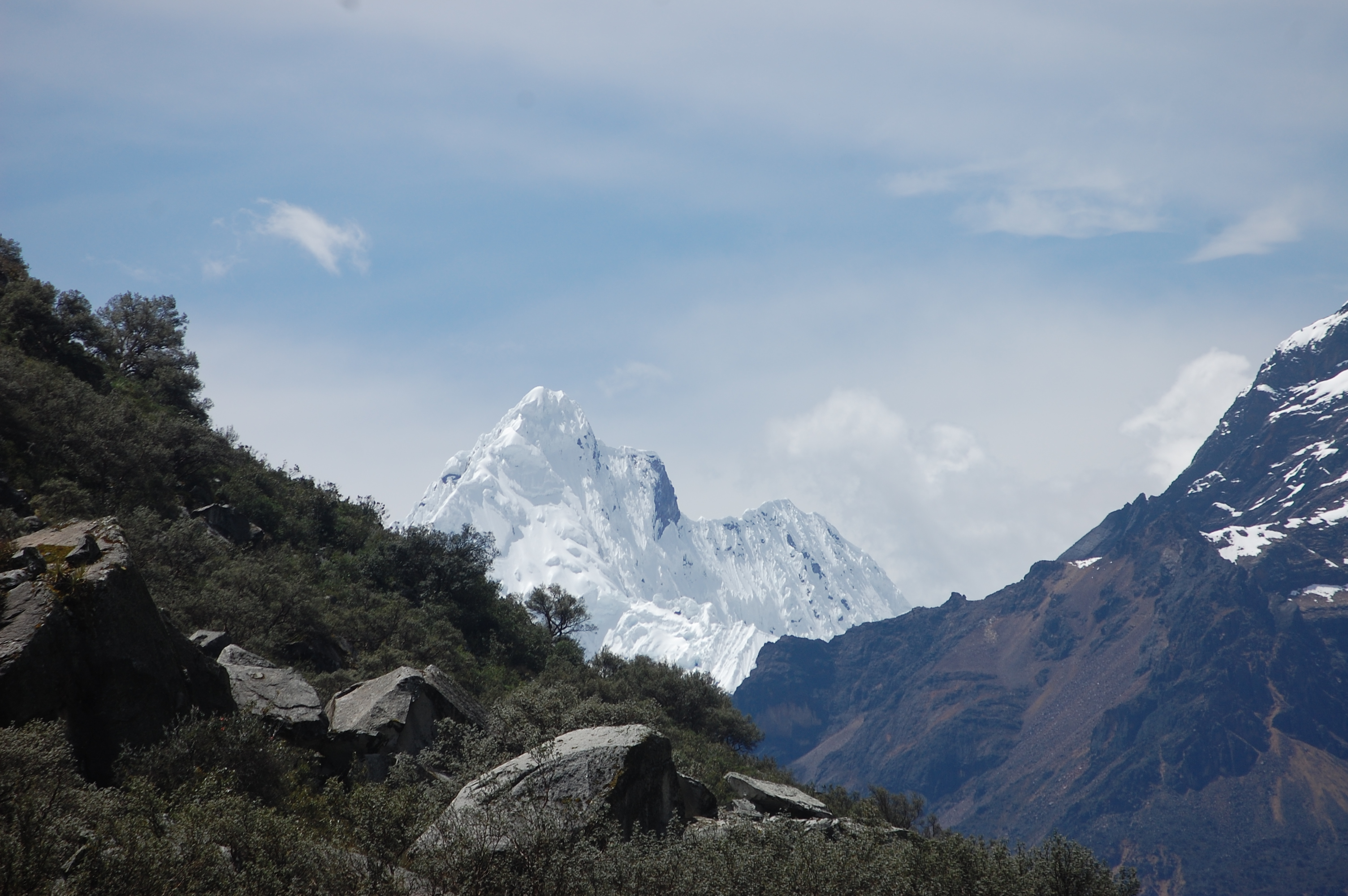
- Tullparaju mountain from the entrance of Quilcayhuanca ravine

Highest point
- Elevation: 5,787 m (18,986 ft)
- Coordinates: 9°24′00″S 77°19′00″W

Geography
- Location within Peru
- Location: Peru, Ancash
- Parent range: Cordillera Blanca

Climbing
- First ascent: 1-1962 via W. ridge: E. ridge-1979

Tullparaju (possibly from Quechua tullpa rustic cooking-fire, stove, rahu snow, ice, mountain with snow) is a mountain in the Cordillera Blanca in the Andes of Peru, about 5,787 metres (18,986 ft) high. It is situated in the Ancash Region, Huaraz Province, Independencia District, and in the Huari Province, Huari District. Tullparaju lies southeast of the mountains Pucaranra and Chinchey and northeast of Andavite. It is situated at the end of the Quilcayhuanca valley, northeast of the lake Tullpacocha.
