= Hatun Jacacocha =

Lake in Peru

- Location within Peru
- Location: Peru; Ancash Region
- Coordinates: 9°29′17″S 77°14′51″W
- Max. length: 180 m (590 ft)
- Max. width: 120 m (390 ft)
- Surface elevation: 4,190 m (13,750 ft)

Hatun Jacacocha or Hatunjacacocha (possibly from Quechua hatun big, qaqa rock, qucha lake, "big rock lake") is a lake in Peru located in the Ancash Region, Huari Province, Huantar District. It is situated at a height of 4,190 m (13,750 ft), about 180 m (590 ft) long and 120 m (390 ft) at its widest point.

Close to Hatun Jacacocha there is a smaller lake named Ichic Jacacocha (possibly from Quechua Ichik Qaqaqucha, ichik little, "little rock lake"). It is situated in the same valley at 9°29′31″S 77°14′44″W, south-east of Hatun Jacacocha. Both lakes are connected by a stream which flows to the Carhuazcancha valley (Qarwakancha) in the north. Ichic Jacacocha is situated at a height of 4,280 m (14,040 ft), about 60 m (200 ft) long and 20 m (66 ft) at its widest point.

Both lakes lie in the Huascarán National Park. They are surrounded by qiwuña (Polylepis) and ichhu (Stipa ichu). Plants like kiswar (Buddleja incana), champa estrella (Plantago rigida) and purwa (or qaqapa pisqun) (Lycopodium crassum) grow at Hatun Jacacocha and there are trouts in the lake.

At the shore of Ichic Jacacocha you find lliqllish qura (Werneria nubigena), ankush (Senecio canescens) and wiqlla (Tillandsia fendleri). This is also a place to watch birds like the plain-tailed warbling finch (Poospiza alticola) and the cinereous conebill (Conirostrum cinereum).

== See also ==
- Carhuascancha
- Huantsan
