= Huaraz District =

Coordinates: 9°32′S 77°32′W

Huaraz Waras
- District
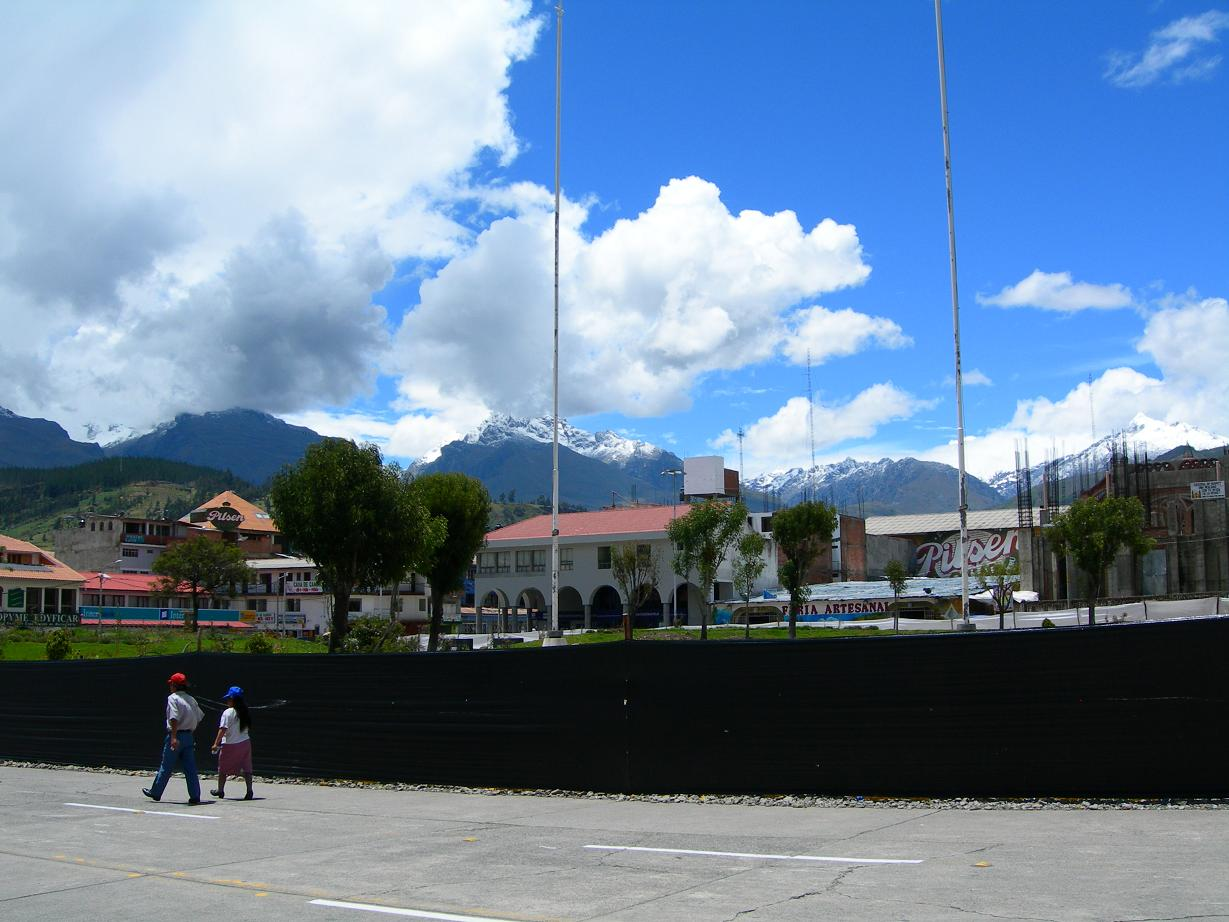
- Main square in Huaraz with the Cordillera Blanca in the background
- Interactive map of Huaraz
- Country: Peru
- Region: Ancash
- Province: Huaraz
- Capital: Huaraz

Government
  - Mayor: Eliseo Rori Mautino Ángeles (2019-2022)

Area
  - Total: 432.99 km^{2} (167.18 sq mi)
- Elevation: 3,052 m (10,013 ft)

Population (2005 census)
  - Total: 52,592
  - Density: 121.46/km^{2} (314.59/sq mi)
- Time zone: UTC-5 (PET)
- UBIGEO: 020101

Huaraz District is one of twelve districts of the province Huaraz in Peru.

== Geography ==
The Cordillera Blanca and the Cordillera Negra traverse the district. Some of the highest mountains of the district are listed below:

- Antap'iti
- Kashan
- Kayish
- Kima Rumi
- Map'arahu
- Puka Hirka
- Qarwakancha
- Wamash Punta
- Wamashrahu

== See also ==
- Administrative divisions of Peru
