= Arteza =

Mountain in Peru

- Location within Peru

Highest point
- Elevation: 5,000 m (16,000 ft)
- Coordinates: 9°27′35″S 77°16′39″W

Geography
- Location: Peru, Ancash Region
- Parent range: Andes, Cordillera Blanca

Arteza (possibly from Quechua for a wooden boat) is a mountain in the Cordillera Blanca in the Andes of Peru, about 5,000 metres (16,404 ft) high. It is situated in the Ancash Region, Huari Province, Huantar District. Arteza lies at the Qarwakancha valley, southeast of Andavite and Cayesh and northeast of Qarwakancha and Maparaju.
