= Araranca =

Mountain in Peru

- Location within Peru

Highest point
- Elevation: 4,800 m (15,700 ft)
- Coordinates: 9°38′15″S 77°17′57″W

Geography
- Location: Peru, Ancash Region
- Parent range: Cordillera Blanca

Araranca (possibly from Quechua for a little lizard) is a mountain in the Cordillera Blanca in the Andes of Peru, about 4,800 metres (15,748 ft) high. It is situated in the Ancash Region, Huaraz Province, Olleros District. Araranca lies southwest of Tuctu and northwest of Yanaraju. It lies north of the Araranca valley.
