= Huantar District =

Coordinates: 9°26′25″S 77°12′40″W

Huantar Wantar
- District
- Interactive map of Huantar
- Country: Peru
- Region: Ancash
- Province: Huari
- Capital: Huantar

Government
  - Mayor: Renan Wilfredo Trejo Garcia

Area
  - Total: 156.15 km^{2} (60.29 sq mi)
- Elevation: 3,354 m (11,004 ft)

Population (2005 census)
  - Total: 2,924
  - Density: 18.73/km^{2} (48.50/sq mi)
- Time zone: UTC-5 (PET)
- UBIGEO: 021008

Huantar District is one of sixteen districts of the Huari Province in Peru.

== Ethnic groups ==
The people in the district are mainly indigenous citizens of Quechua descent. Quechua is the language which the majority of the population (92.86%) learnt to speak in childhood, 6.33% of the residents started speaking using the Spanish language (2007 Peru Census).

== See also ==
- Artisa
- Hatun Qaqaqucha and Ichik Qaqaqucha
- Kayish
- Map'arahu
- Qarwakancha
