= Quimarumi =

Mountain in Peru

- Minas
- Location within Peru

Highest point
- Elevation: 5,459 m (17,910 ft)
- Coordinates: 9°28′34″S 77°21′21″W

Geography
- Location: Peru, Ancash Region
- Parent range: Andes, Cordillera Blanca

Quimarumi (possibly from Ancash Quechua kima three, rumi stone, "three stones"), also known as Minas (Spanish for mines), is a 5,459-metre-high (17,910 ft) mountain in the Cordillera Blanca in the Andes of Peru. It is located in the Ancash Region, Huaraz Province, Huaraz District. Quimarumi lies on a ridge between the Quilcayhuanca valley and the Shallap valley, northwest of Carhuascancha and northeast of Qullapaqu.
