= Pumahuacanca =

Mountain in Peru

- Location within Peru

Highest point
- Elevation: 5,000 m (16,000 ft)
- Coordinates: 9°36′29″S 77°20′48″W

Geography
- Location: Peru, Ancash Region
- Parent range: Andes, Cordillera Blanca

Pumahuacanca or Pumahuaganga (possibly from Quechua: puma cougar, puma, waqay to cry, -nqa a suffix, "the cougar will cry") is a mountain in the Cordillera Blanca in the Andes of Peru which reaches a height of approximately 5,000 m (16,000 ft). It is located in the Ancash Region, Huaraz Province, Olleros District. Pumahuacanca lies southwest of Uruashraju and southeast of Shacsha.

Pumahuacanca (Pumahuaganga) is also the name of an intermittent stream which originates near the mountain. It flows to the south.
