= Tullpacocha =

Lake in Peru

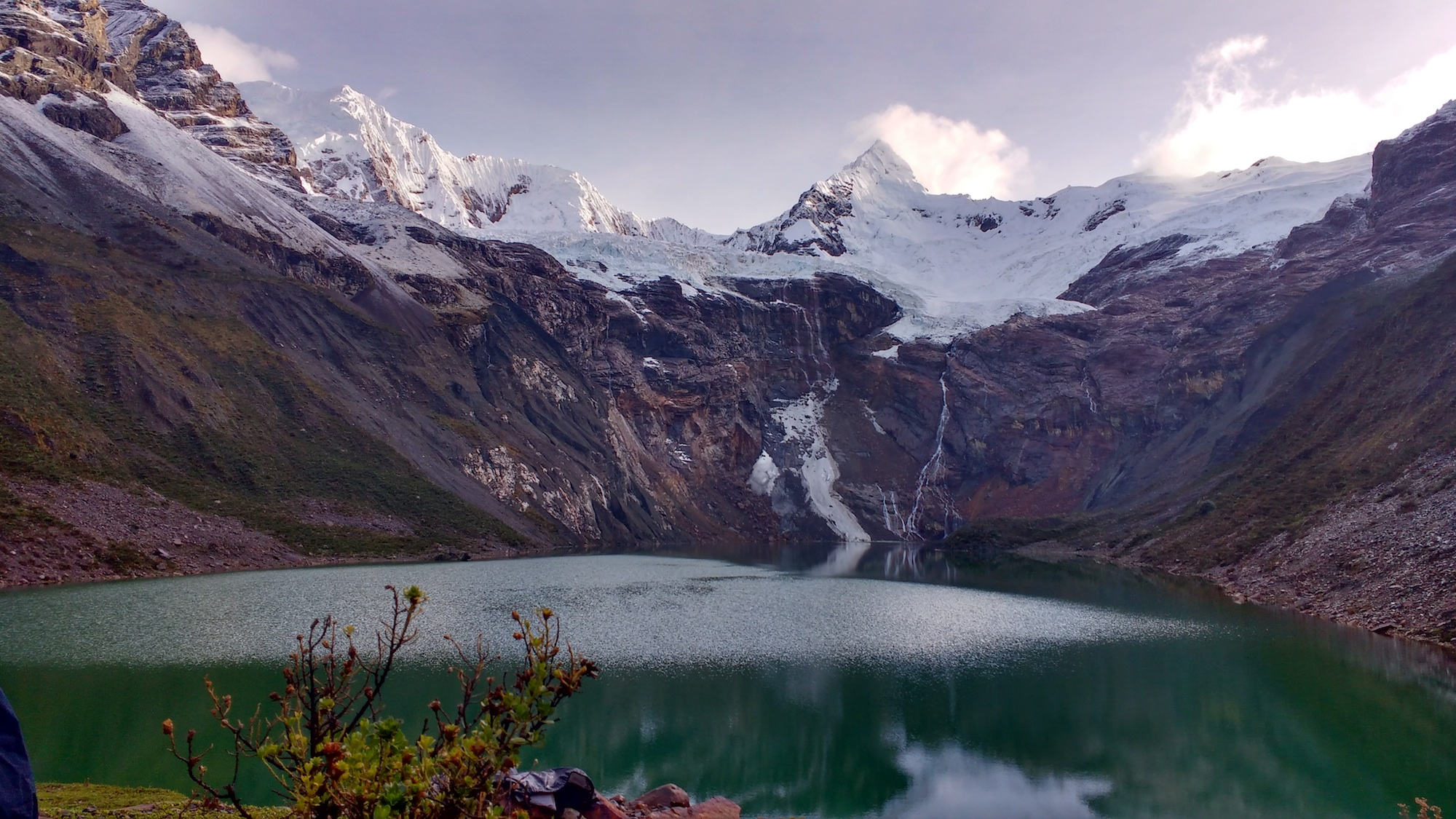
- Tullparaju mountain at the center and Tullpacocha lake beneath

- Location within Peru
- Location: Peru; Ancash Region
- Coordinates: 9°25′15″S 77°20′36″W

Tullpacocha or Tulpacocha (possibly from Quechua tullpa rustic cooking-fire, stove, qucha lake,) is a lake in Peru located in the Ancash Region, Huaraz Province, Independencia District. Tullpacocha lies in the Cordillera Blanca, southeast of Palcaraju and Pucaranra, southwest of Chinchey and Tullparaju and northwest of Andavite, at the very end of the Quilcayhuanca gorge.
