= Tuctopunta =

Mountain in Peru

- Location within Peru

Highest point
- Elevation: 5,343 m (17,530 ft)
- Coordinates: 9°36′15″S 77°19′10″W

Geography
- Location: Peru, Ancash, Bolognesi Province
- Parent range: Cordillera Blanca

Tuctopunta (possibly from Quechua tuqtu broody hen, punta peak; ridge; first, before, in front of) is a 5,343-metre-high (17,530 ft) mountain in the Cordillera Blanca in the Andes of Peru. It is located in the Ancash Region, Huaraz Province, Olleros District. Tuctopunta lies northwest of Tuctu and southwest of Uruashraju and Arhuay.
