= Tocllaraju =

Mountain in Peru

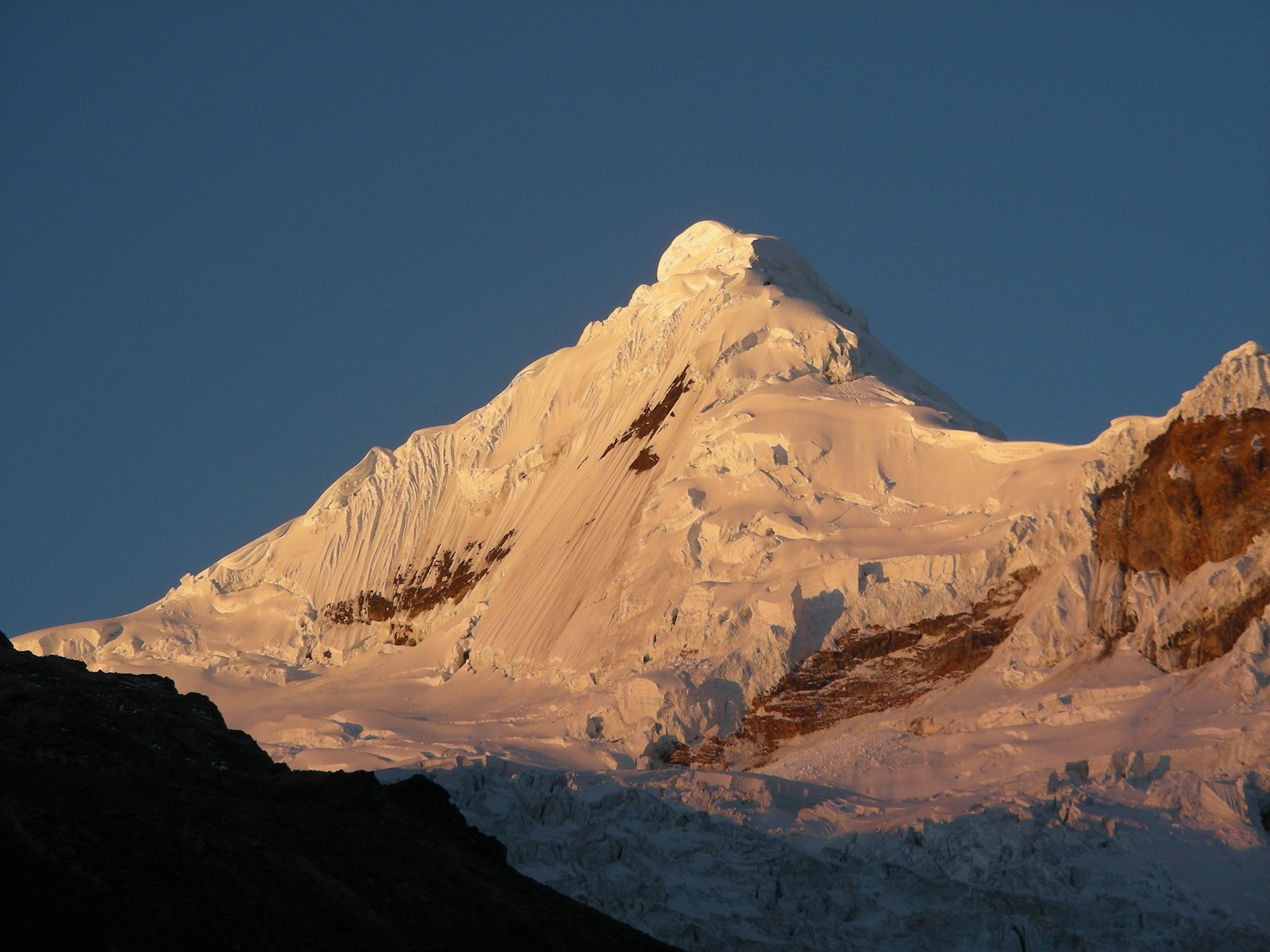

Highest point
- Elevation: 6,034 m (19,797 ft)
- Prominence: 2,757 m (9,045 ft)
- Parent peak: Chinchey
- Coordinates: 9°20′51.46″S 077°23′48.47″W

Geography
- Location within Peru
- Parent range: Peruvian Andes, Andes

Climbing
- First ascent: 07/31/1939 - Walther Brecht and Hans Schweizer (Germany)

Tocllaraju (possibly from Quechua tuqlla trap, rahu snow, ice, mountain with snow, "snow-covered trap mountain") is a mountain in the Cordillera Blanca in the Andes of Peru, about 6,034 m (19,797 ft) high. It is situated in the Ancash Region, Carhuaz Province, Aco District, and in the Huaraz Province, Tarica District. Its territory is within the Peruvian protection area of Huascarán National Park. Tocllaraju lies north-west of the mountains Pukaranra and Palcaraju.

== Elevation ==
Although official sources mention 6034 metres, DEM elevation data shows lower numbers (SRTM 5950 metres and TanDEM-X 5928 metres), Therefore, Tocllaraju might not reach the 5980 metre altitude.

The height of the nearest key col is 3253 meters, therefore its topographic prominence is 2757 meters. Tocllaraju is considered a Mountain Sub-System according to the Dominance System and its dominance is 45.87%. Its parent peak is Chinchey and the Topographic isolation is 8.3 kilometers.

== Climbing ==
The normal route to the summit of this mountain is the Northwest Ridge rated Alpine D (difficile/difficult). The Northwest Ridge route was the route used to claim the first ascent of Tocllaraju by W. Brecht and H. Schweizer on 31 July 1939. An alternative route to the summit is the West Face Direct route rated Alpine D+ and was first climbed on 18 July 1980.
