= Yanaraju =

Yanaraju (possibly Quechua for "black snow peak") may refer to:

- Contrahierbas, a mountain in Ancash, Peru; also called Yanaraju.
- Urus, a mountain in Ancash, Peru; also called Yanaraju.
- Yanamarey, a mountain in Ancash, Peru; also called Yanaraju.
