= Tarica District =

Coordinates: 8°36′00″S 77°46′01″W

Tarica
- District
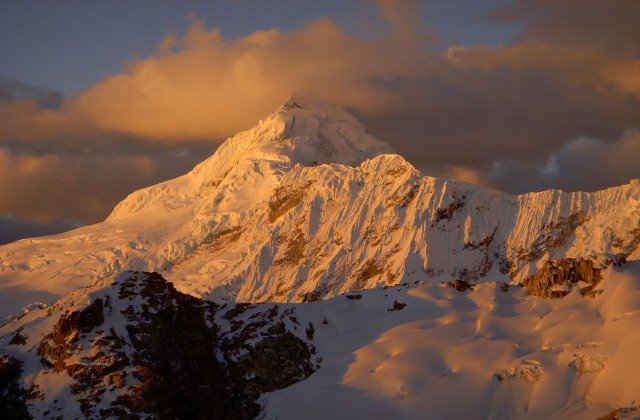
- Tuqllarahu on the eastern border of the district
- Interactive map of Tarica
- Country: Peru
- Region: Ancash
- Province: Huaraz
- Founded: February 2, 1956
- Capital: Tarica

Government
  - Mayor: Fredy Hildo Chinchay Salazar

Area
  - Total: 110.28 km^{2} (42.58 sq mi)
- Elevation: 2,802 m (9,193 ft)

Population (2005 census)
  - Total: 5,500
  - Density: 50/km^{2} (130/sq mi)
- Time zone: UTC-5 (PET)
- UBIGEO: 020112

Tarica District is one of twelve districts of the province Huaraz in Peru.

== Geography ==
The Cordillera Blanca traverses the district. Some of the highest peaks of the district are Ranrapallqa, and Tuqllarahu. Other mountains are listed below:

- Hatun Kunka
- Uqshapallqa
- Yanarahu

== Ethnic groups ==
The people in the district are mainly indigenous citizens of Quechua descent. Quechua is the language which the majority of the population (68.31%) learnt to speak in childhood, 31.53% of the residents started speaking using the Spanish language (2007 Peru Census).
