= Independencia District, Huaraz =

Coordinates: 9.5146°S 77.5275°W

Independencia
- District
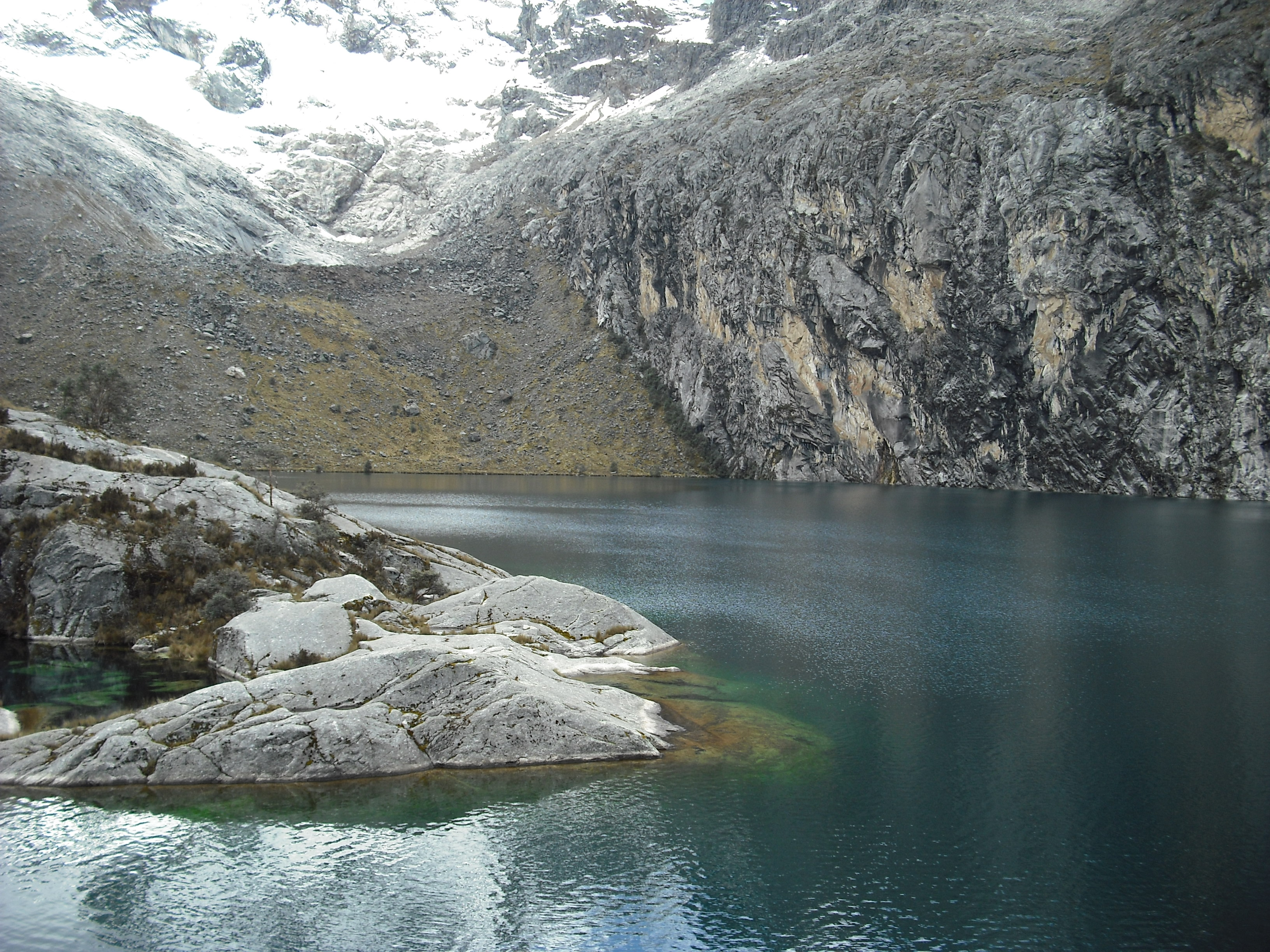
- Churup Lake, Independencia District

- Coat of arms
- Interactive map of Independencia
- Country: Peru
- Region: Ancash
- Province: Huaraz
- Founded: November 16, 1992
- Capital: Centenario

Government
  - Mayor: Gregorio Emiliano Mezarina Paredes

Area
  - Total: 342.95 km^{2} (132.41 sq mi)
- Elevation: 3,049 m (10,003 ft)

Population (2005 census)
  - Total: 61,705
  - Density: 179.92/km^{2} (466.00/sq mi)
- Time zone: UTC-5 (PET)
- UBIGEO: 020105

Independencia District is one of twelve districts of the province Huaraz in Peru.

== Geography ==
The Cordillera Blanca traverses the district. Some of the highest peaks of the district are Pallqarahu, Pukaranra, Ranrapallqa and Rurichinchay. Other mountains are listed below:

- Churup
- Hatun Kunka
- Puka Qaqa Punta
- Rima Rima
- Uqshapallqa
- Tullparahu

== See also ==
- Pallqaqucha
- Qillqaywank'a
- Tullpaqucha
- Willkawayin
