= Cashan (Peru) =

Mountain in Peru

- Tijeraspunta
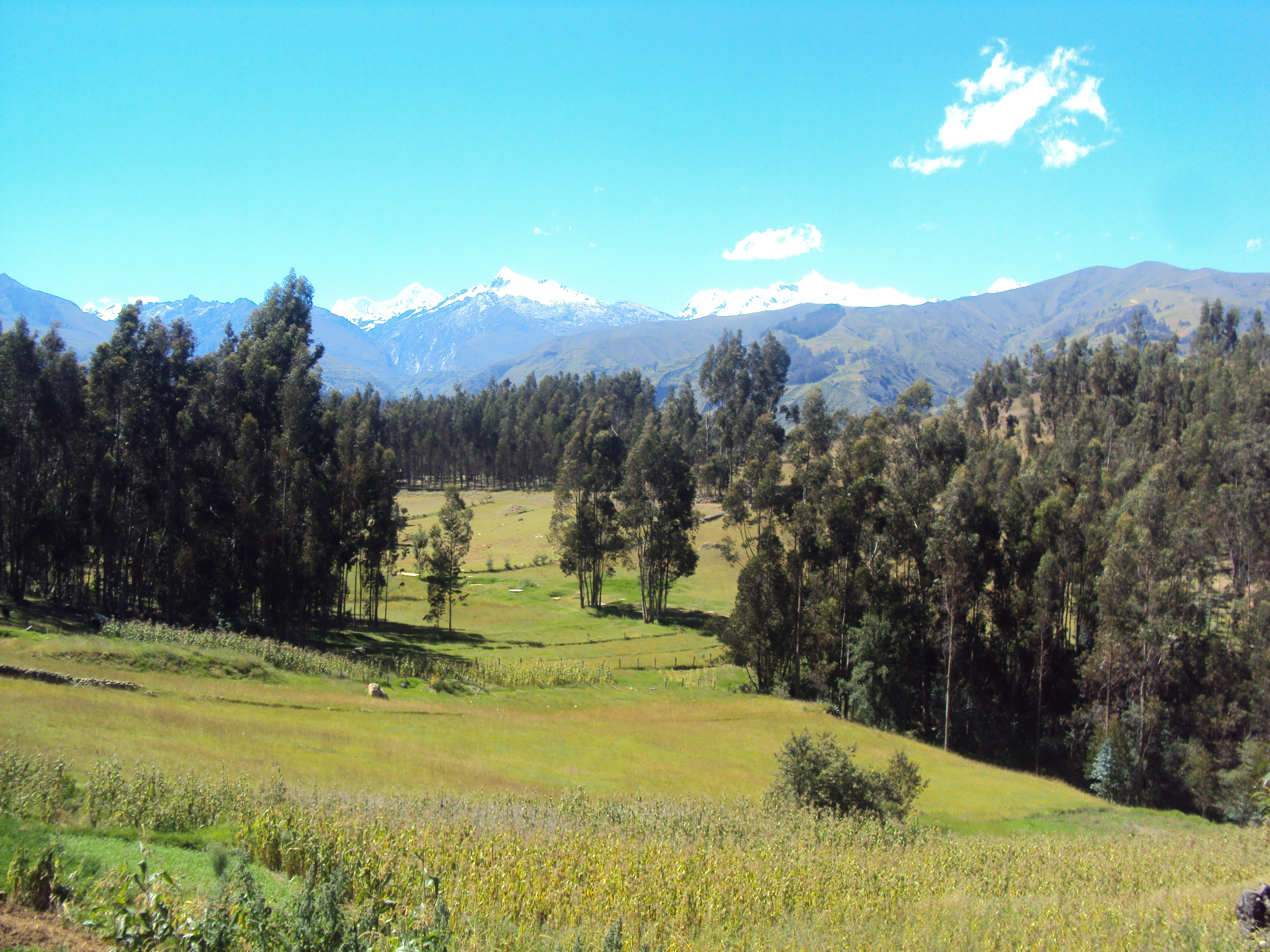
- Huantsán, Huamashraju, Cashan and Shacsha as seen from the west

Highest point
- Elevation: 5,716 m (18,753 ft)
- Coordinates: 9°33′26″S 77°21′20″W

Geography
- Location within Peru
- Location: Peru, Ancash Region
- Parent range: Andes, Cordillera Blanca

Cashan, Kashan (possibly from Quechua kasha thorn or spine -n a suffix) or Tijeraspunta is a mountain in the Cordillera Blanca in the Andes of Peru, about 5,716 metres (18,753 ft) high. It is located in the Ancash Region, Huaraz Province, in the districts of Huaraz and Olleros. Cashan lies southeast of the town of Huaraz, southwest of Huantsán, west of Uruashraju and northeast of Shacsha.
