= Rúrec =

Mountain in Peru

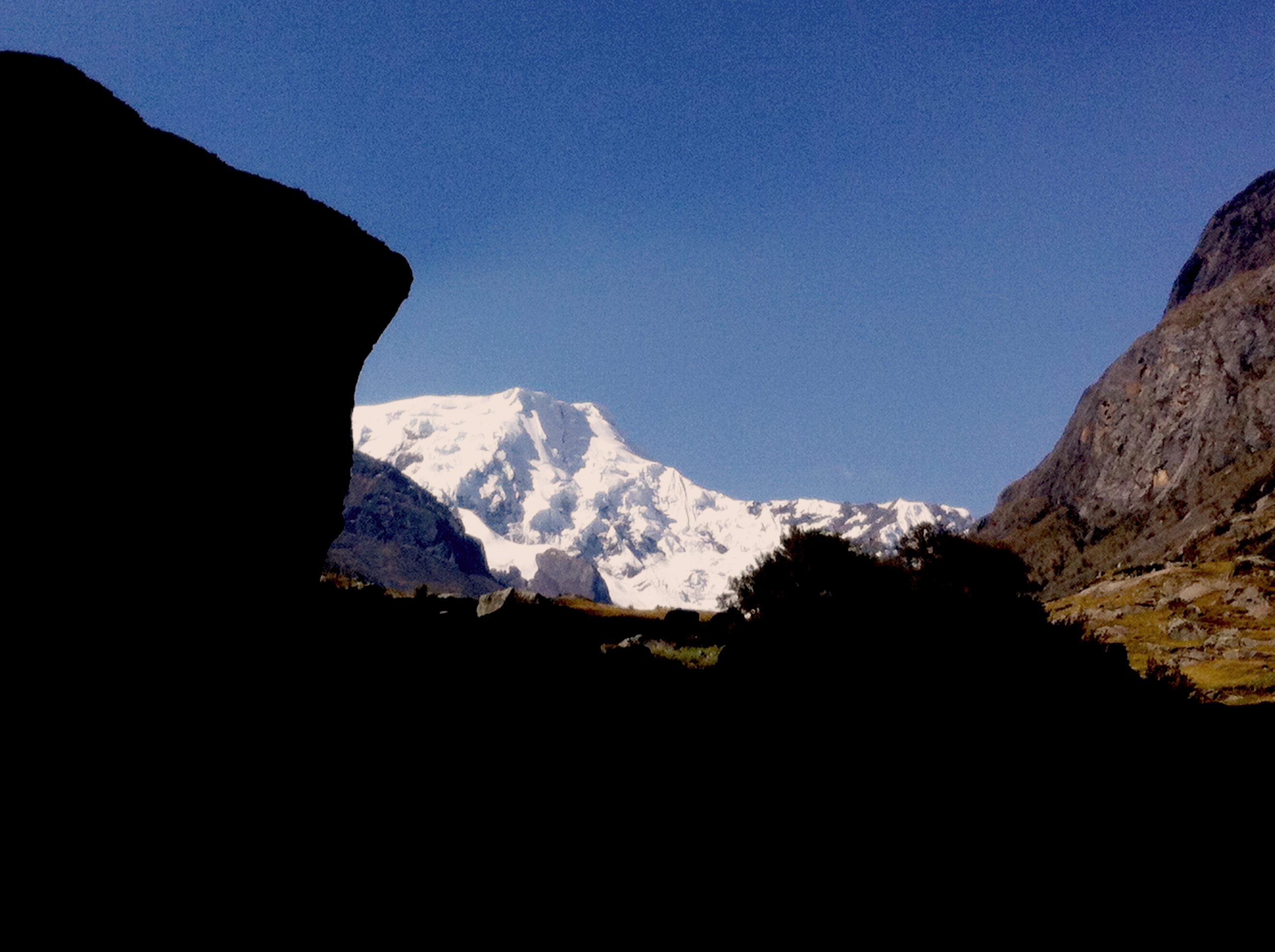
- Rurec mountain, west face, in August 2019.

Highest point
- Elevation: 5,700 m (18,700 ft)
- Coordinates: 9°33′57″S 77°18′24″W

Geography
- Location within Peru
- Location: Ancash, Peru
- Parent range: Andes, Cordillera Blanca

Rúrec, also spelled Rurec, (possibly from Quechua ruri interior; valley or little river, -q a suffix) is a 5,700-metre-high (18,701 ft) mountain in the southern part of the Cordillera Blanca in the Andes of Peru. It is located in the Ancash Region, Huaraz Province, Olleros District, and in the Huari Province, Chavín de Huantar District. Rúrec is located south of Huantsán.
