= Maparaju =

Mountain in Peru

- Location within Peru

Highest point
- Elevation: 5,326 m (17,474 ft)
- Coordinates: 9°27′00″S 77°18′12″W

Geography
- Location: Peru, Ancash Region
- Parent range: Andes, Cordillera Blanca

Maparaju (possibly from Quechua map'a dirty, stained, rahu mountain with snow, "dirty (or stained) snow mountain") is a 5,326-metre-high (17,474 ft) mountain in the Cordillera Blanca in the Andes of Peru. It is located between Huaraz and Huari provinces, in the region of Ancash. Maparaju lies at the head of the Cayesh valley, southwest of Cayesh and Artisa and northeast of Qarwakancha.

Lake Maparaju is a little lake located south of the mountain at 9°28′15″S 77°18′09″W.
