= Tuctu (Ancash) =

Mountain in Peru

- Location within Peru

Highest point
- Elevation: 5,000 m (16,000 ft)
- Coordinates: 9°37′28″S 77°16′48″W

Geography
- Location: Peru, Ancash Region
- Parent range: Andes, Cordillera Blanca

Tuctu (possibly from Quechua for "broody hen") is a mountain in the Cordillera Blanca in the Andes of Peru, about 5,000 metres (16,404 ft) high. It is situated in the Ancash Region, Huaraz Province, Olleros District, and in the Huari Province, Chavin de Huantar District. It lies southeast of Arhuay, Uruashraju and Tuctopunta.
