= Wamanpinta (Huaraz) =

Mountain in Peru

- Location within Peru

Highest point
- Elevation: 4,400 m (14,400 ft)
- Coordinates: 9°28′34″S 77°40′57″W

Geography
- Location: Peru, Ancash Region
- Parent range: Andes, Cordillera Blanca

Wamanpinta (Quechua for Chuquiraga, also spelled Huamanpinta) is a mountain in the Cordillera Blanca in the Andes of Peru which reaches a height of approximately 4,400 m (14,436 ft). It is located in the Ancash Region, Huaraz Province, Pira District.
