= Colcabamba District, Huaraz =

Coordinates: 9°34′59″S 77°49′01″W

Colcabamba Qullqapampa
- District
- Interactive map of Colcabamba
- Country: Peru
- Region: Ancash
- Province: Huaraz
- Founded: October 31, 1941
- Capital: Colcabamba

Government
  - Mayor: Jonas Micaias Jamanca Carbajal

Area
  - Total: 50.65 km^{2} (19.56 sq mi)
- Elevation: 3,136 m (10,289 ft)

Population (2005 census)
  - Total: 270
  - Density: 5.3/km^{2} (14/sq mi)
- Time zone: UTC-5 (PET)
- UBIGEO: 020103

Colcabamba District is one of twelve districts of the province Huaraz in Peru.
