= Jatuncunca =

Mountain in Peru

- Janyaraju, Jangyraju
- Location within Peru

Highest point
- Elevation: 5,600 m (18,400 ft)
- Coordinates: 9°24′37″S 77°27′01″W

Geography
- Location: Peru, Ancash Region
- Parent range: Andes, Cordillera Blanca

Jatuncunca (possibly from Quechua hatun big, kunka throat, gullet, "big throat" or big gullet"), Janyaraju or Jangyraju is a mountain in the Cordillera Blanca of the Andes of Peru, about 5,600 metres (18,373 ft) high. It is located in the Ancash Region, Huaraz Province, on the border of the districts Independencia and Tarica. Jatuncunca lies west of Ocshapalca.
