= Pira District =

Coordinates: 9°34′01″S 77°43′01″W

Pira
- District
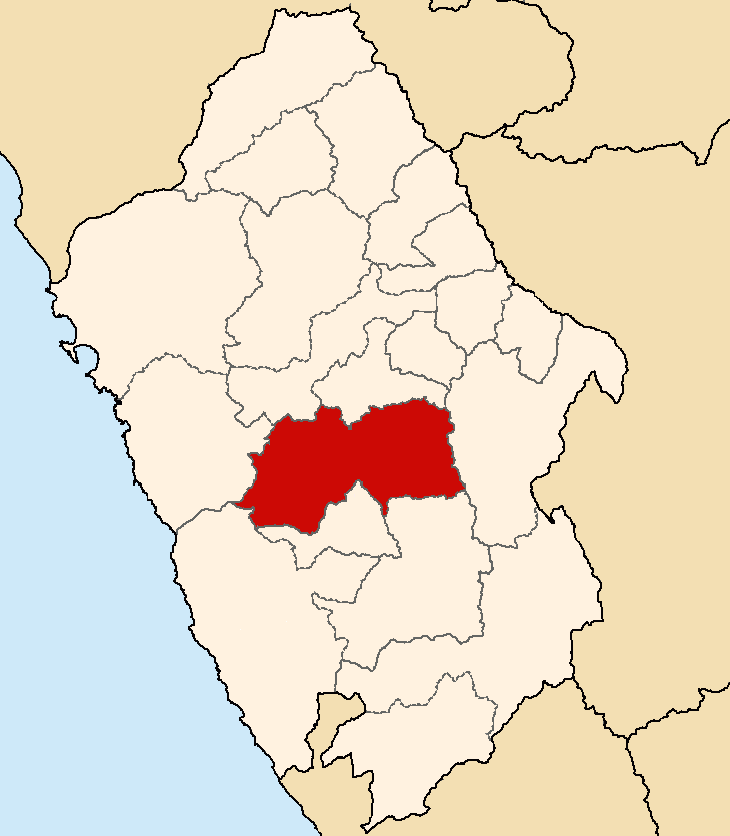
- The location of the Pira district in Peru
- Interactive map of Pira
- Country: Peru
- Region: Ancash
- Province: Huaraz
- Founded: November 19, 1917
- Capital: Pira

Government
  - Mayor: Hector Raul Obregon Inti

Area
  - Total: 243.73 km^{2} (94.10 sq mi)
- Elevation: 3,570 m (11,710 ft)

Population (2017)
  - Total: 3,321
  - Density: 13.63/km^{2} (35.29/sq mi)
- Time zone: UTC-5 (PET)
- UBIGEO: 020111

Pira District is one of twelve districts of the province Huaraz in Peru.

== Ethnic groups ==
The people in the district are mainly indigenous citizens of Quechua descent. Quechua is the language which the majority of the population (83.20%) learnt to speak in childhood, 16.63% of the residents started speaking using the Spanish language (2007 Peru Census).

== See also ==
- Wamanpinta
