= Pariacoto District =

Pariacoto District Distrito de Pariacoto
- District
- Interactive map of Pariacoto District
- Coordinates: 9°31′01″S 77°52′59″W
- Country: Peru
- Region: Ancash
- Province: Huaraz
- Founded: January 2, 1857
- Capital: Pariacoto

Government
  - Mayor: Artemio Mejia Ramos

Area
  - Total: 162.5 km^{2} (62.7 sq mi)
- Elevation: 1,239 m (4,065 ft)

Population (2005 census)
  - Total: 4,248
  - Density: 26.14/km^{2} (67.71/sq mi)
- Time zone: UTC-5 (PET)
- UBIGEO: 020110

Pariacoto District is one of twelve districts of the province Huaraz in Peru.

== Ethnic groups ==
The people in the district are mainly indigenous citizens of Quechua descent. Quechua is the language which the majority of the population (57.35%) learnt to speak in childhood, 42.48% of the residents started speaking using the Spanish language (2007 Peru Census).

== See also ==
- Puka Hirka
