= Ocshapalca =

Mountain in Peru

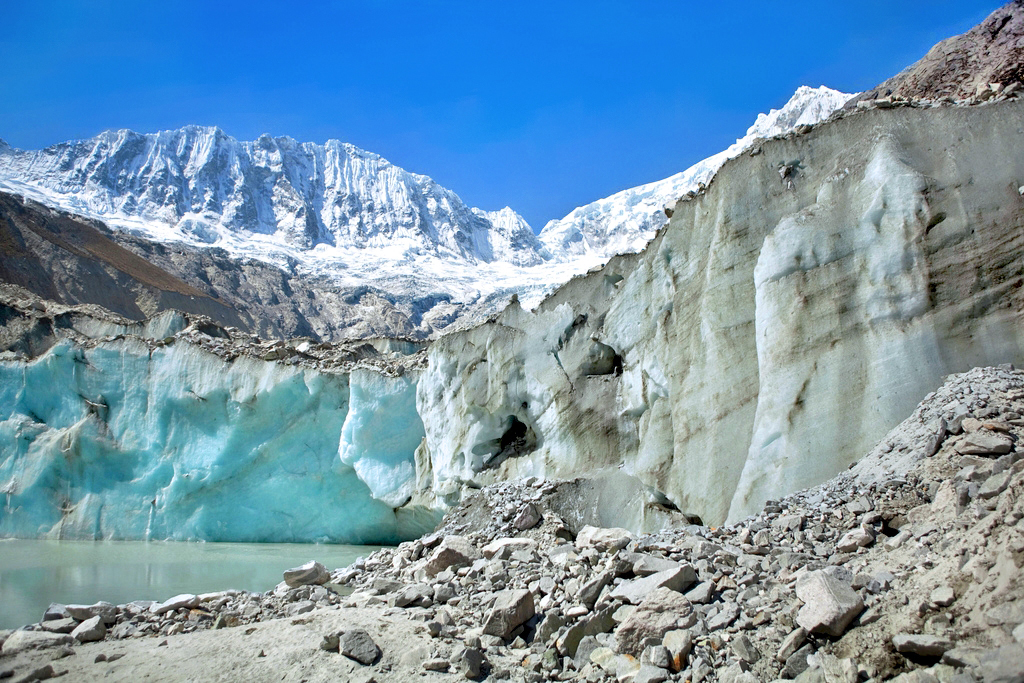
- Ocshapalca (on the left) and Ranrapalca (on the right), the Llaqa Glacier and Llaqa Lake

Highest point
- Elevation: 5,888 m (19,318 ft)
- Coordinates: 9°24′30″S 77°26′5″W

Geography
- Location within Peru
- Location: Ancash, Peru
- Parent range: Andes, Cordillera Blanca

Climbing
- First ascent: 1-1965 via N. ridge: S. face-1979: S. face (new route)-1989.

Ocshapalca (possibly from Quechua uqsha high altitude grass, pallqa bifurcation, division into two parts) is a mountain in the Cordillera Blanca in the Andes of Peru, about 5,888 m (19,318 ft) high. It is situated in the Ancash Region, Huaraz Province, on the border of the districts Independencia District and Tarica. Ocshapalca lies between the mountain Hatunkunka in the west and Ranrapalca in the east.

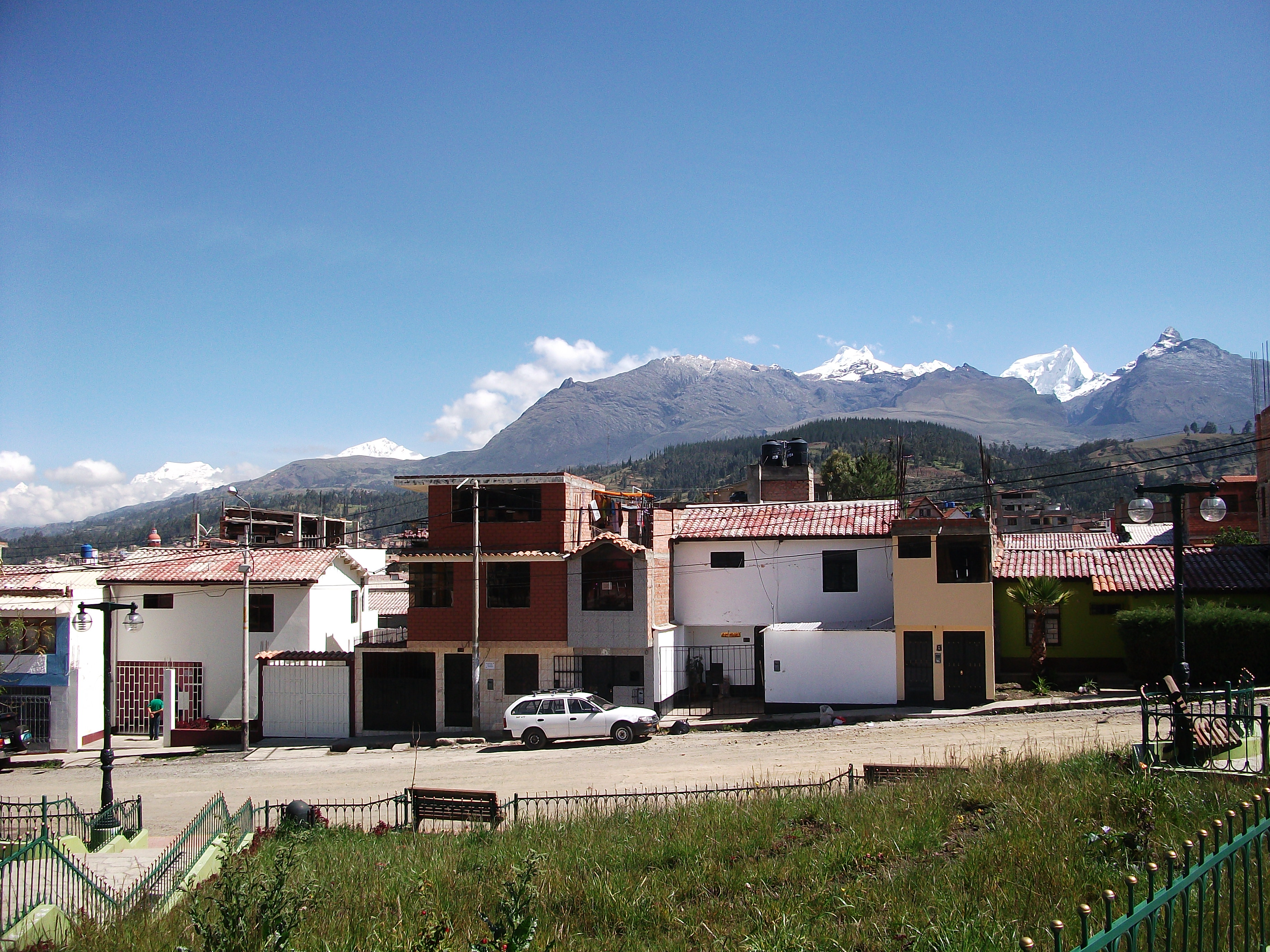
Vallunaraju, Ocshapalca and Ranrapalca (the snow-covered mountains on the right) as seen from Huaraz
