= Jangas District =

Coordinates: 9°24′00″S 77°34′59″W

Jangas
- District
- Interactive map of Jangas
- Country: Peru
- Region: Ancash
- Province: Huaraz
- Founded: January 2, 1857
- Capital: Jangas

Government
  - Mayor: Wilder Jhon Hinostroza Minaya

Area
  - Total: 59.84 km^{2} (23.10 sq mi)
- Elevation: 2,825 m (9,268 ft)

Population (2005 census)
  - Total: 4,345
  - Density: 72.61/km^{2} (188.1/sq mi)
- Time zone: UTC-5 (PET)
- UBIGEO: 020106

Jangas District is one of twelve districts of the province Huaraz in Peru.

== Ethnic groups ==
The people in the district are mainly indigenous citizens of Quechua descent. Quechua is the language which the majority of the population (71.53%) learnt to speak in childhood, 28.08 % of the residents started speaking using the Spanish language (2007 Peru Census).
