= Olleros District, Huaraz =

Coordinates: 9°37′59″S 77°28′59″W

Olleros
- District
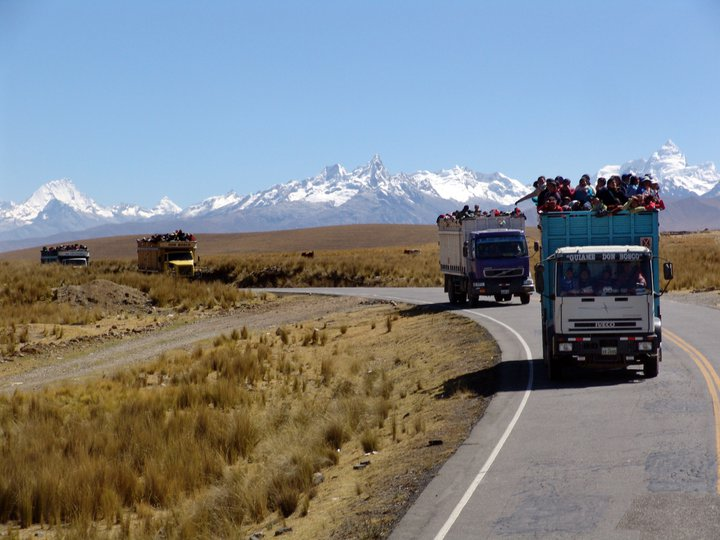
- The Cordillera Blanca with Shaqsha (center) as seen from the southwest
- Interactive map of Olleros
- Country: Peru
- Region: Ancash
- Province: Huaraz
- Founded: October 16, 1933
- Capital: Olleros

Government
  - Mayor: Sixto Feliciano Blacido León

Area
  - Total: 222.91 km^{2} (86.07 sq mi)
- Elevation: 3,336 m (10,945 ft)

Population (2005 census)
  - Total: 2,761
  - Density: 12.39/km^{2} (32.08/sq mi)
- Time zone: UTC-5 (PET)
- UBIGEO: 020108

Olleros District is one of twelve districts of the province Huaraz in Peru.

== Geography ==
The Cordillera Blanca traverses the district. Some of the highest peaks of the district are listed below:

- Ararankha
- Arway
- Kashan
- Puma Waqanqa
- Ruriq
- Shaqsha
- Tuqtu
- Tuqtu Punta
- Urwashrahu
- Wamash Punta
- Yanarahu

== Ethnic groups ==
The people in the district are mainly indigenous citizens of Quechua descent. Quechua is the language which the majority of the population (67.54%) learnt to speak in childhood, 32.17% of the residents started speaking using the Spanish language (2007 Peru Census).
