= Puka Hirka (Huaraz-Yungay) =

Mountain in Peru

- Location within Peru

Highest point
- Elevation: 4,870 m (15,980 ft)
- Coordinates: 9°25′32″S 77°46′48″W

Geography
- Location: Peru, Ancash Region
- Parent range: Andes, Cordillera Negra

Puka Hirka (Quechua puka red, hirka mountain, "red mountain", Hispanicized spelling Puca Jirca) is a 4,870-metre-high (15,980 ft) mountain in the Cordillera Negra in the Andes of Peru. It is situated in the Ancash Region, Huaraz Province, on the border of the districts of Cochabamba and Pariacoto, and in the Yungay Province, Shupluy District. It lies southwest of Willka Wayin.
