= Cochabamba District, Huaraz =

Coordinates: 9.483°S 77.867°W

Cochabamba Quchapampa
- District
- Interactive map of Cochabamba; Quchapampa
- Country: Peru
- Region: Ancash
- Province: Huaraz
- Founded: September 30, 1943
- Capital: Cochabamba

Government
  - Mayor: Vido Segundo Sanchez Sifuentes

Area
  - Total: 135.65 km^{2} (52.37 sq mi)
- Elevation: 2,105 m (6,906 ft)

Population (2005 census)
  - Total: 2,051
  - Density: 15.12/km^{2} (39.16/sq mi)
- Time zone: UTC-5 (PET)
- UBIGEO: 020102

Cochabamba District is one of twelve districts of the province Huaraz in Peru.

== Ethnic groups ==
The people in the district are mainly indigenous citizens of Quechua descent. Quechua is the language which the majority of the population (77.83%) learnt to speak in childhood, 22.06% of the residents started speaking using the Spanish language (2007 Peru Census).

== See also ==
- Puka Hirka
