= Ishinca =

Mountain in Peru

Nevado Ishinca
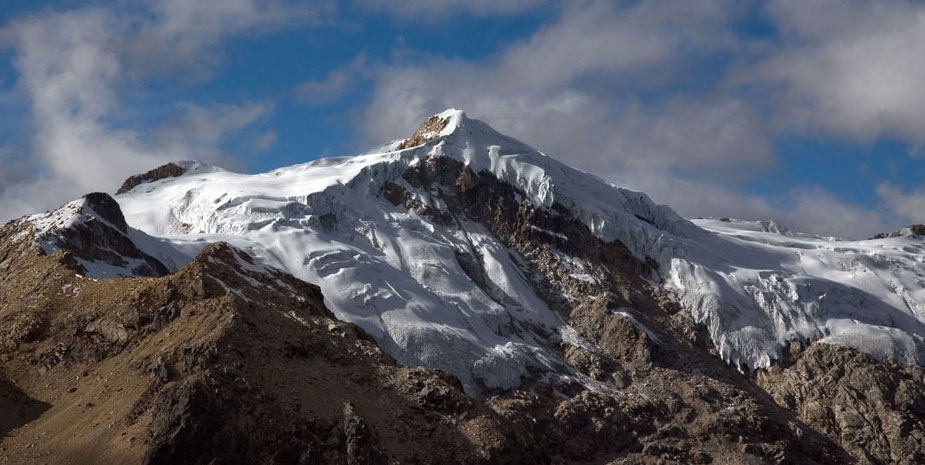

Highest point
- Elevation: 5,530 m (18,140 ft)
- Coordinates: 09°23′18.9″S 77°24′12.8″W

Geography
- Location within Peru
- Location: Ancash, Peru
- Parent range: Cordillera Blanca

Climbing
- Easiest route: North-West Route; Alpine Grade PD- (peu difficile/somewhat difficult)

Nevado Ishinca, meaning "snow covered mountain", is a mountain peak located in the Cordillera Blanca mountain range in the Peruvian Andes. It is located in the Ishinca Valley region and has a summit elevation of 5,530 meters. Ishinca is most often climbed via its normal route, the North-West Route rated Alpine PD-. Ishinca's North-West Route was first ascended by J. Fonrouge, W. Lindaver, H. Salger, H. Schmidbauer and V. Staudacher in 1964.

Oronymy

At Anqash Runa Simi: ichinqa → ishinqa → ishinca (it will stand).
