= Shacsha =

Mountain in Peru

- Shaqsha, Huanchan, Huantsán Chico
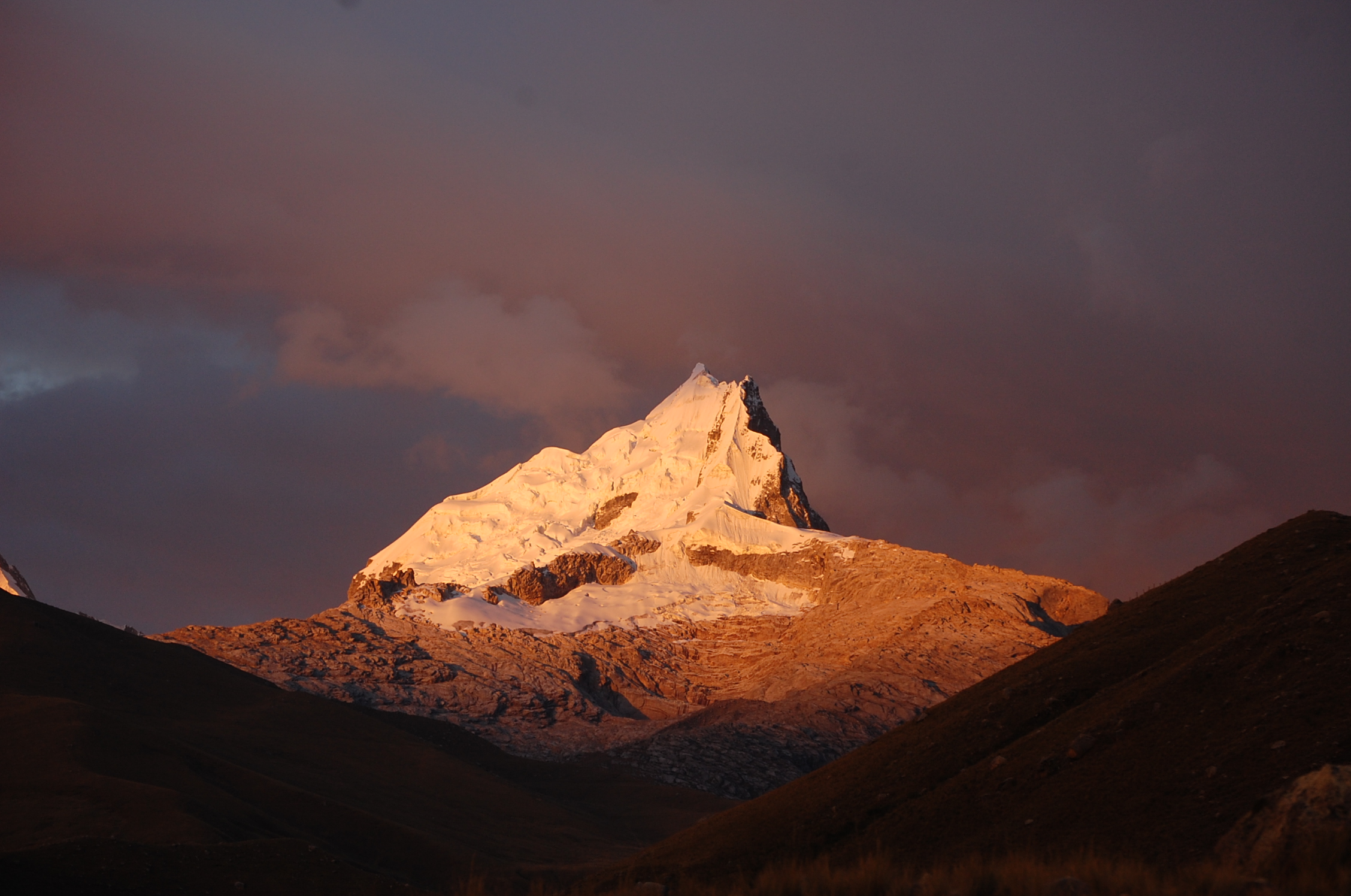
- Shacsha mountain from Olleros

Highest point
- Elevation: 5,703 m (18,711 ft)
- Coordinates: 9°35′08″S 77°22′08″W

Geography
- Location within Peru
- Location: Peru, Ancash Region
- Parent range: Andes, Cordillera Blanca

Shacsha, Shaqsha, (possibly from Ancash Quechua for jingle bell / a typical dancer of the Ancash Region), Huantsán Chico or Huanchan is a mountain in the Cordillera Blanca in the Andes of Peru, about 5,703 metres (18,711 ft) high, (other sources cite a height of 5,632 metres (18,478 ft)). It is situated in the Ancash Region, Huaraz Province, Olleros District. Shacsha lies southwest of Huantsán, west of Uruashraju and southeast of the town of Huaraz.

A nearby small lake to the west is also named Shacsha or Shacshacocha.

== See also ==
- Cashan
- Ranrapalca
- Huamashraju
