= Andavite =

Mountain in Peru

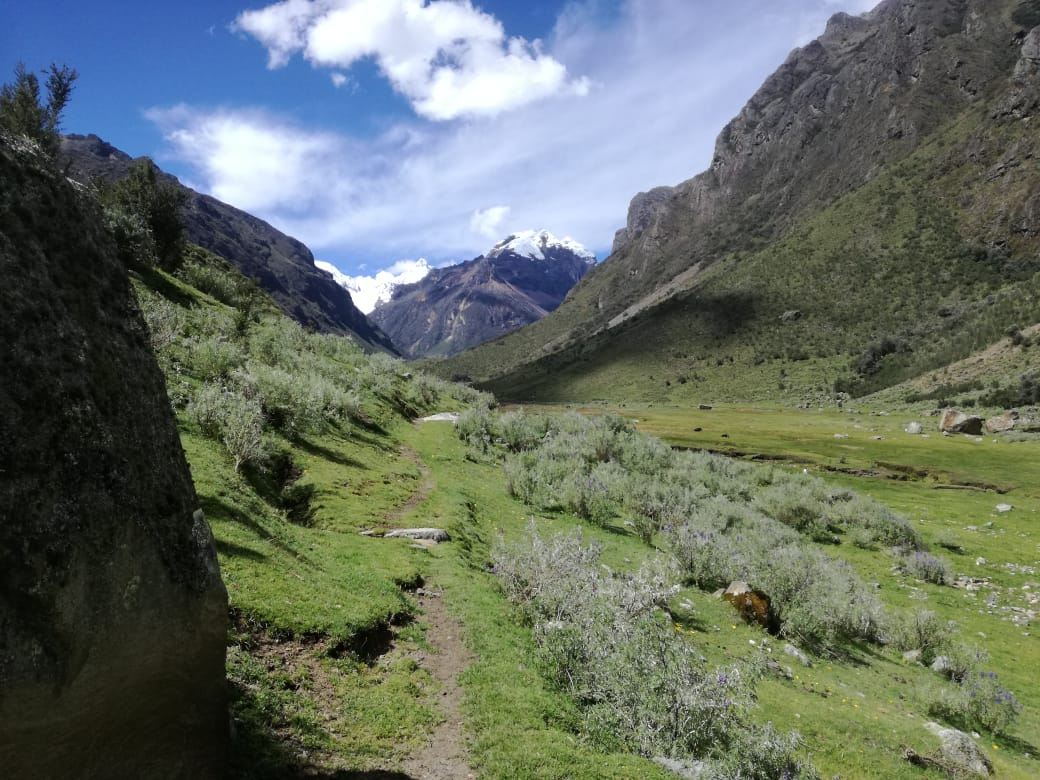

Highest point
- Elevation: 5,518 m (18,104 ft)
- Coordinates: 9°25′51″S 77°19′33″W

Geography
- Location within Peru
- Location: Ancash, Peru
- Parent range: Cordillera Blanca

Andavite (possibly from Quechua anta copper, p'iti dividing by pulling powerfully to the extremes; gap, interruption) or Chopiraju is a 5,518-metre-high (18,104 ft) mountain in the Cordillera Blanca in the Andes of Peru. It is located northeast of the village of Pitec, between Huaraz and Huari provinces in Ancash. Andavite lies northwest of Cayesh and southeast of Tullparaju. It is situated at the end of the Quilcayhuanca valley, southeast of a lake named Tullpacocha.
