= Huaraz Province =

Coordinates: 9°31′38″S 77°32′00″W

Huaraz
- Province
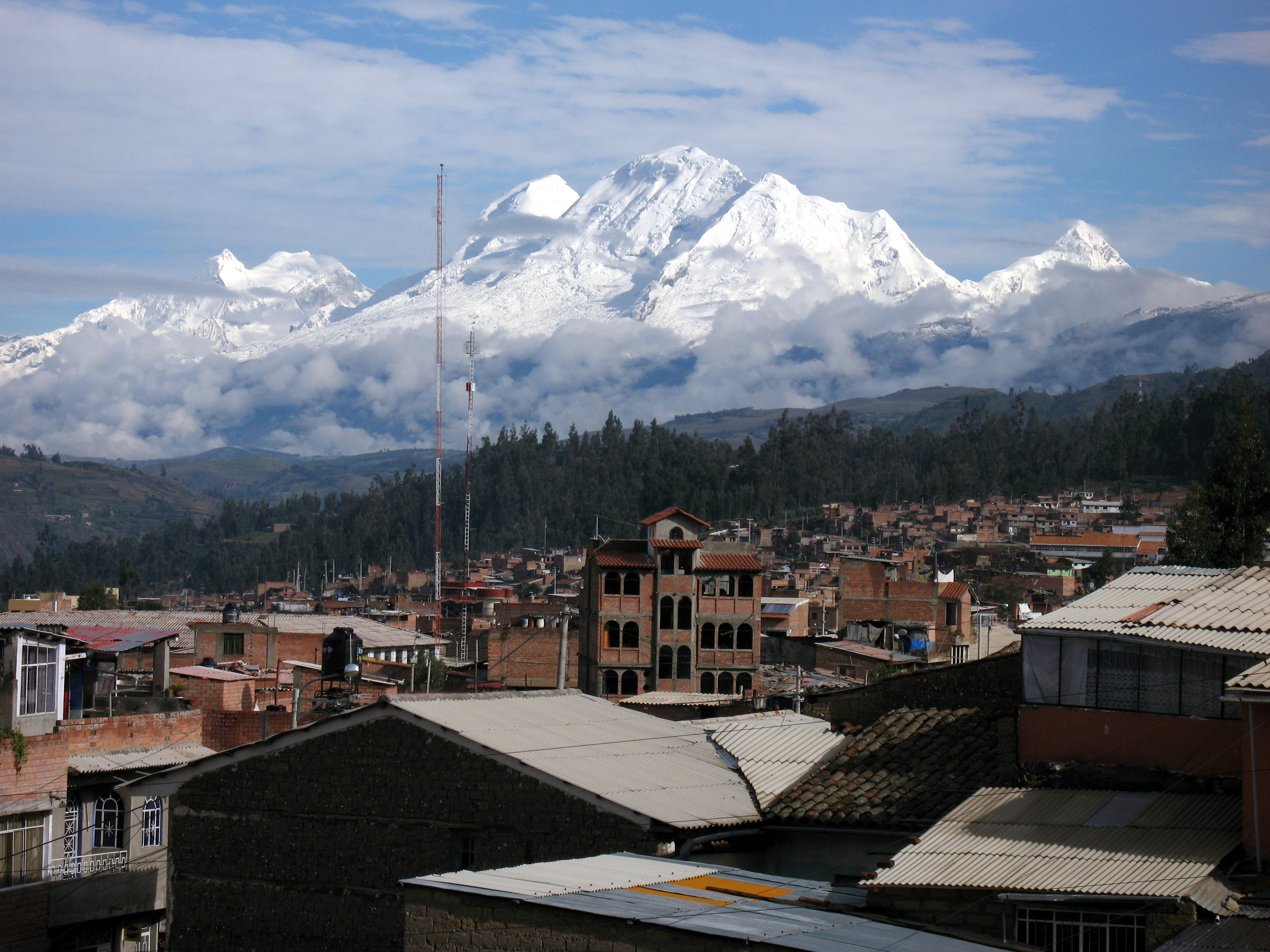
- Looking north over Huaraz towards the Cordillera Blanca

- Flag Coat of arms

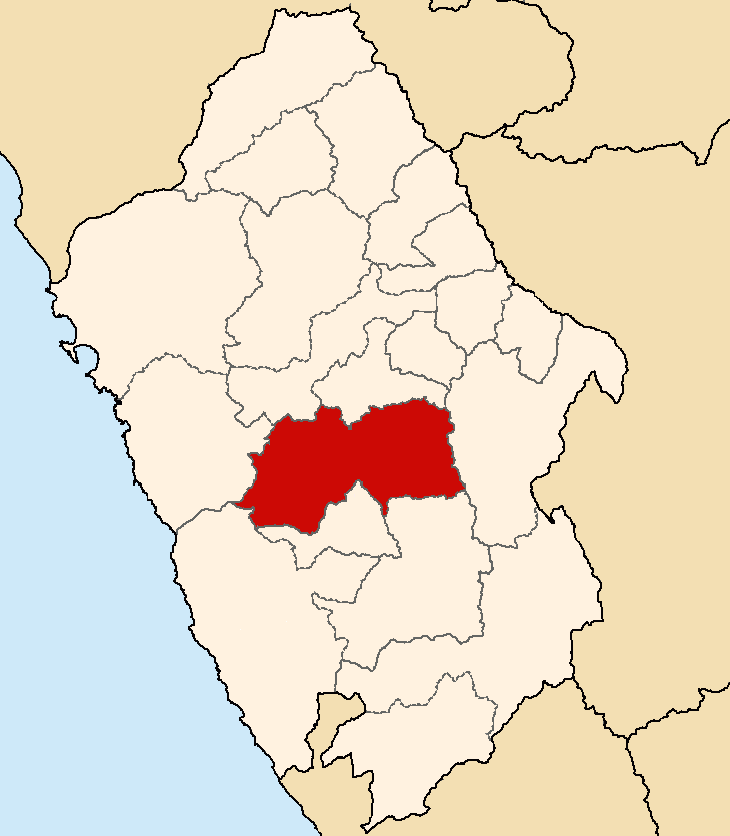
- Location of Huaraz in the Ancash Region
- Country: Peru
- Region: Ancash
- Capital: Huaraz

Government
  - Mayor: Eliseo Rori Mautino Ángeles (2019-2022)

Area
  - Total: 2,492.91 km^{2} (962.52 sq mi)
- Elevation: 3,052 m (10,013 ft)

Population
  - Total: 143,415
  - Density: 57.5292/km^{2} (149.000/sq mi)
- UBIGEO: 0201
- Website: www.munihuaraz.gob.pe

Huaraz is one of twenty provinces of the Ancash Region in Peru. It was created on August 5, 1857, during the presidency of Ramón Castilla. Geographically, the province is located over the Callejón de Huaylas and the western slopes of the Cordillera Negra.

The Regional Museum of Archaeology is located in the Huaraz district. Some other highlights of the province are the Pumacayán hill, the hot springs of Monterrey (at 6 km or 4 mi from the city) and the Willkawain archaeological sites, at 13 kilometres (8 mi) to the north of Huaraz, in village of Paria, in the Independencia district.

== Geography ==
The Cordillera Blanca and the Cordillera Negra traverse the province. Some of the highest peaks of the province are Pucaranra, Chinchey, Tocllaraju and Huantsán. Other mountains are listed below:

- Araranca
- Churup
- Jatuncunca
- Cayesh
- Kima Rumi
- Maparaju
- Lake Palcacocha
- Puka Hirka
- Puka Hirka (Aija-Huaraz-Recuay)
- Pucagaga Punta
- Pucaranra
- Puma Waqanqa
- Carhuascancha
- Ranrapalca
- Rima Rima
- Rúrec
- Shacsha
- Tullparaju
- Tuctu
- Tuctopunta
- Ocshapalca
- Uruashraju
- Vallunaraju
- Wamanpinta
- Huamashraju
- Huantsán
- Urus (Carhuaz-Huaraz)
- Yanamarey (Huaraz-Huari-Recuay)

At 30 kilometres (20 mi) from Huaraz, by the route Huaraz–Casma that crosses the Cordillera Negra, there is a place named Punta Callan in the summit of this mountain range. It offers a panoramic sight of the Cordillera Blanca and the Callejón de Huaylas.

== Political division ==
Huaraz is divided into twelve districts, which are the following:

- Cochabamba
- Colcabamba
- Huanchay
- Huaraz
- Independencia
- Jangas
- La Libertad
- Olleros
- Pampas
- Pariacoto
- Pira
- Tarica

== Ethnic groups ==
The province is inhabited by indigenous and mestizo citizens of Quechua descent. Spanish is the language which the majority of the population (63.43%) learnt to speak in childhood, 36.28% of the residents started speaking using the Quechua language (2007 Peru Census).

== See also ==
- Administrative divisions of Peru
- Pallqaqucha
- Tullpaqucha
