= Urus (mountain) =

Mountain in Peru

- Yanaraju
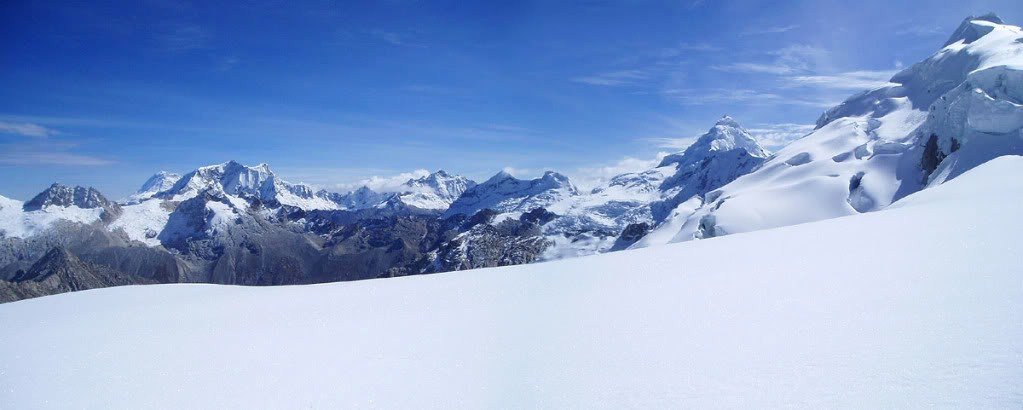
- Urus in front of Huascarán and Copa (on the left)

Highest point
- Elevation: 5,423 m (17,792 ft)
- Coordinates: 9°21′18″S 77°26′06″W

Geography
- Location within Peru
- Location: Peru, Ancash Region
- Parent range: Andes, Cordillera Blanca

Urus, also known as Yanaraju (possibly from Quechua yana black, rahu snow, ice, mountain with snow, "black snow peak"), is a 5,423-metre-high (17,792 ft) mountain in the Cordillera Blanca in the Andes of Peru. It located between Carhuaz and Huaraz provinces, in Ancash. Urus lies in Huascarán National Park, west of Tocllaraju.
