= Carhuascancha =

Mountain in Peru

- Location within Peru

Highest point
- Elevation: 5,648 m (18,530 ft)
- Coordinates: 9°29′10″S 77°19′19″W

Geography
- Location: Peru, Ancash Region
- Parent range: Cordillera Blanca

Carhuascancha (possibly from Quechua qarwa yellowish / golden / pale / leaf worm, larva of a beetle, kancha enclosure, enclosed place, yard, a frame, or wall that encloses) or Tumarinaraju is a mountain in the Cordillera Blanca in the Andes of Peru with an elevation of 5,648 metres (18,530 ft) or 5,668 metres (18,596 ft) above sea level. It is situated in the Ancash Region, Huari Province, Huantar District, and in the Huaraz Province, Huaraz District. Carhuascancha lies north-west of Huantsán.

The Carhuascancha River originates east of the mountain and flows eastwards.
