= Uruashraju =

Mountain in Peru

- Verdecocha
- Location within Peru

Highest point
- Elevation: 5,722 m (18,773 ft)
- Coordinates: 9°34′39″S 77°18′44″W

Geography
- Location: Peru, Ancash Region
- Parent range: Andes

Climbing
- First ascent: 1-1966 via W. ridge, S. buttress: S. ridge-1975: N.W. face-1982.

Uruashraju (possibly from the regional Quechua spelling, urwa infertile, sterile; corn plant without corncob used as fodder, rahu snow, ice, mountain with snow) or Verdecocha (possibly from Spanish verde green, Quechua qucha lake, "green lake") is a mountain in the Cordillera Blanca of the Andes of Peru, about 5,722 metres (18,773 ft) high. It is located in the Ancash Region, Huaraz Province, Olleros District, and in the Huari Province, Chavín de Huantar District. Uruashraju lies south of Huantsán, east of Cashán and Shacsha, and southeast of Lake Tararhua (Lake Verdecocha).
