= Cayesh =

Mountain in Peru

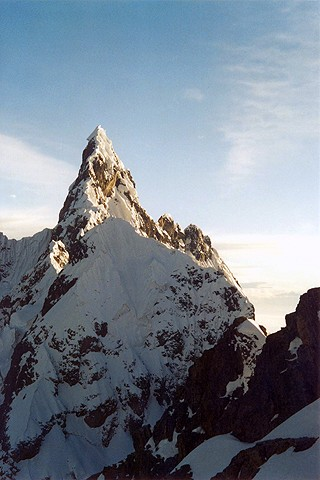
- Cayesh seen from the summit of Maparaju glacier.

Highest point
- Elevation: 5,721 m (18,770 ft)
- Coordinates: 9°26′21″S 77°18′00″W

Geography
- Location within Peru
- Location: Peru, Ancash Region
- Parent range: Andes, Cordillera Blanca

Cayesh is a mountain in the Cordillera Blanca in the Andes of Peru, about 5,721 metres (18,770 ft) high. It is located between Huaraz and Huari provinces in Ancash. Cayesh lies at the head of the Cayesh valley, northwest of Artisa and southeast of Andavite.
