= Chinchey =

Mountain in Peru

- Rurichinchay
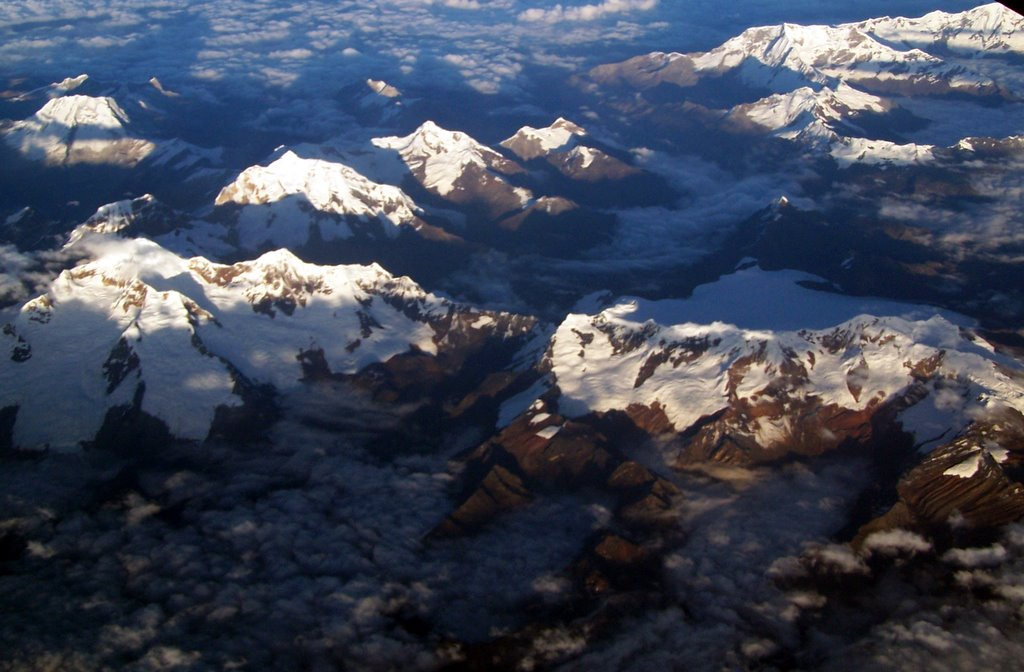
- Aerial view of the Cordillera Blanca as seen from the southeast showing Ranrapalca and Chinchey in the left part of the image

Highest point
- Elevation: 6,309 m (20,699 ft)
- Prominence: 1,342 m (4,403 ft)
- Listing: List of mountains in the Andes
- Coordinates: 9°22′57″S 77°19′47″W

Geography
- Location within Peru
- Location: Ancash, Peru
- Parent range: Cordillera Blanca

Chinchey, also known as Rurichinchay, is a 6,309-metre-high (20,699 ft) mountain in the Cordillera Blanca in the Andes of Peru. It is located in the region of Ancash, most precisely between the districts of Aco (in Carhuaz Province), Independencia (in Huaraz Province), and Huari (in Huari Province).

Rurichinchay is also the name of the lake northeast of the mountain at 9°20′31″S 77°19′04″W and the name of the river which originates at the lake. It flows to the southeast.

== See also ==
- Pucaranra
