= San Miguel de Aco District =

Coordinates: 8.367°S 77.650°W

San Miguel de Aco Aqu
- District
- Interactive map of San Miguel de Aco
- Country: Peru
- Region: Ancash
- Province: Carhuaz
- Founded: December 7, 1953
- Capital: Aco

Government
  - Mayor: Tomas Severiano Gutierrez Lliuya

Area
  - Total: 133.89 km^{2} (51.70 sq mi)
- Elevation: 2,925 m (9,596 ft)

Population (2005 census)
  - Total: 2,353
  - Density: 17.57/km^{2} (45.52/sq mi)
- Time zone: UTC-5 (PET)
- UBIGEO: 020608

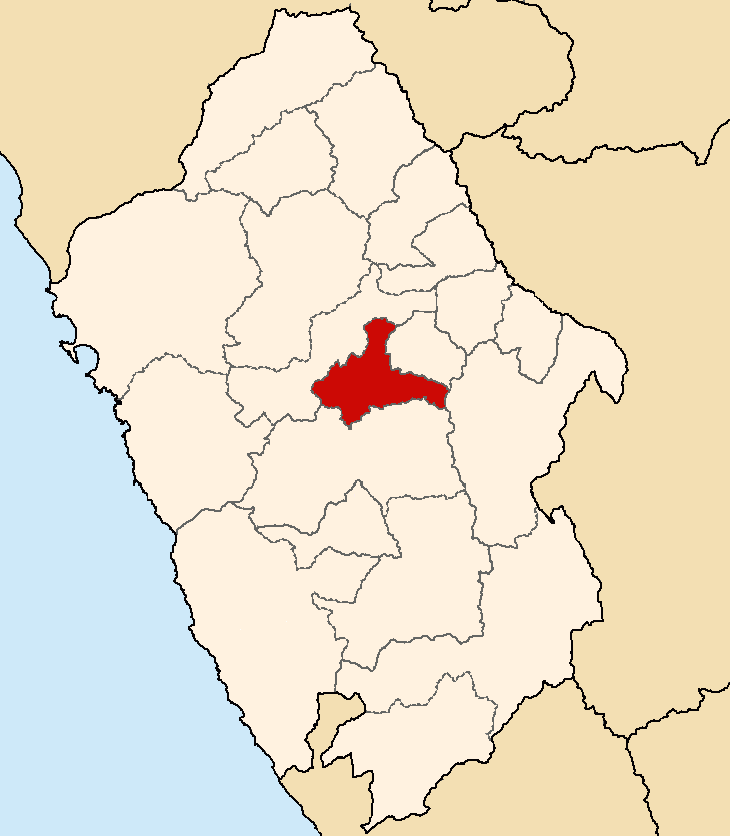
Location of the province Carhuaz in the Ancash region in Peru.

San Miguel de Aco District is one of eleven districts of the Carhuaz Province in Peru.

== Ethnic groups ==
The people in the district are mainly indigenous citizens of Quechua descent. Quechua is the language which the majority of the population (96.98%) learnt to speak in childhood, 2.90% of the residents started speaking using the Spanish language (2007 Peru Census).

== See also ==
- Ancash Quechua
