= Pucaranra =

Mountain in Peru

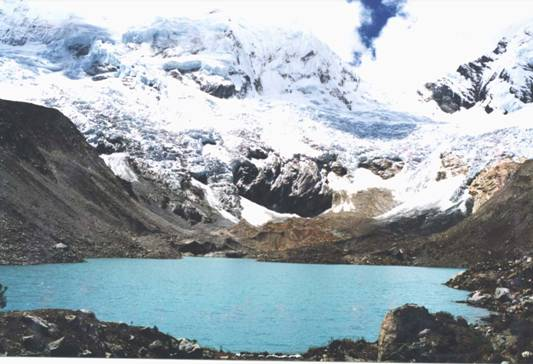
- Palcaraju (on the left) and Pucaranra (on the right) behind Lake Palcacocha

Highest point
- Elevation: 6,147 m (20,167 ft)
- Prominence: 2,903 m (9,524 ft)
- Parent peak: Chinchey
- Coordinates: 9°23′30″S 77°21′03″W

Geography
- Location within Peru
- Location: Peru, Ancash Region
- Parent range: Andes, Cordillera Blanca

Climbing
- First ascent: 07/04/1948 - B. Lauterburg, Federico Marmillod, R. Schmid and F. Sigrist (Switzerland) via S.W. spur of S. ridge Variant on S.W. side-1954 E. slopes-1957: N.E. ridge-1959 S.W. ridge, S.W. face-1965 W. ridge-1977
- Easiest route: southeast ridge, AD

Pucaranra (possibly from Quechua puka red, ranra stony; stony ground,) is a mountain in the Cordillera Blanca in the Andes of Peru, about 6,147 metres (20,167 ft) high (although other sources cite an elevation of 6,156 metres (20,197 ft). It is located in Ancash, southwest of mount Chinchey. Its territory is within the Peruvian protection area of Huascarán National Park, at the border of two provinces: Carhuaz and Huaraz (Districts of San Miguel De Aco and Independencia).

== First ascent ==
Pucaranra was first climbed by B. Lauterburg, Federico Marmillod, R. Schmid and F. Sigrist (Switzerland) April 7, 1948, via Southwest spur of the south ridge.

== Elevation ==
Other data from available digital elevation models: SRTM 6138 metres and TanDEM-X 5961 metres. The height of the nearest key col is 3253 meters, leading to a topographic prominence of 2903 meters. Pucaranra is considered a Mountain Sub-System according to the Dominance System and its dominance is 47.16%. Its parent peak is Chinchey and the Topographic isolation is 2.4 kilometers.

== Climbing ==
Several interesting lines on this mountain, none of them serious but all requiring commitment. The east-northeast ridge is rated AD/D (depending on conditions), the southeast face AD+ and the southeast ridge AD.
