= Huantsán =

Mountain in Peru

- Tunsho
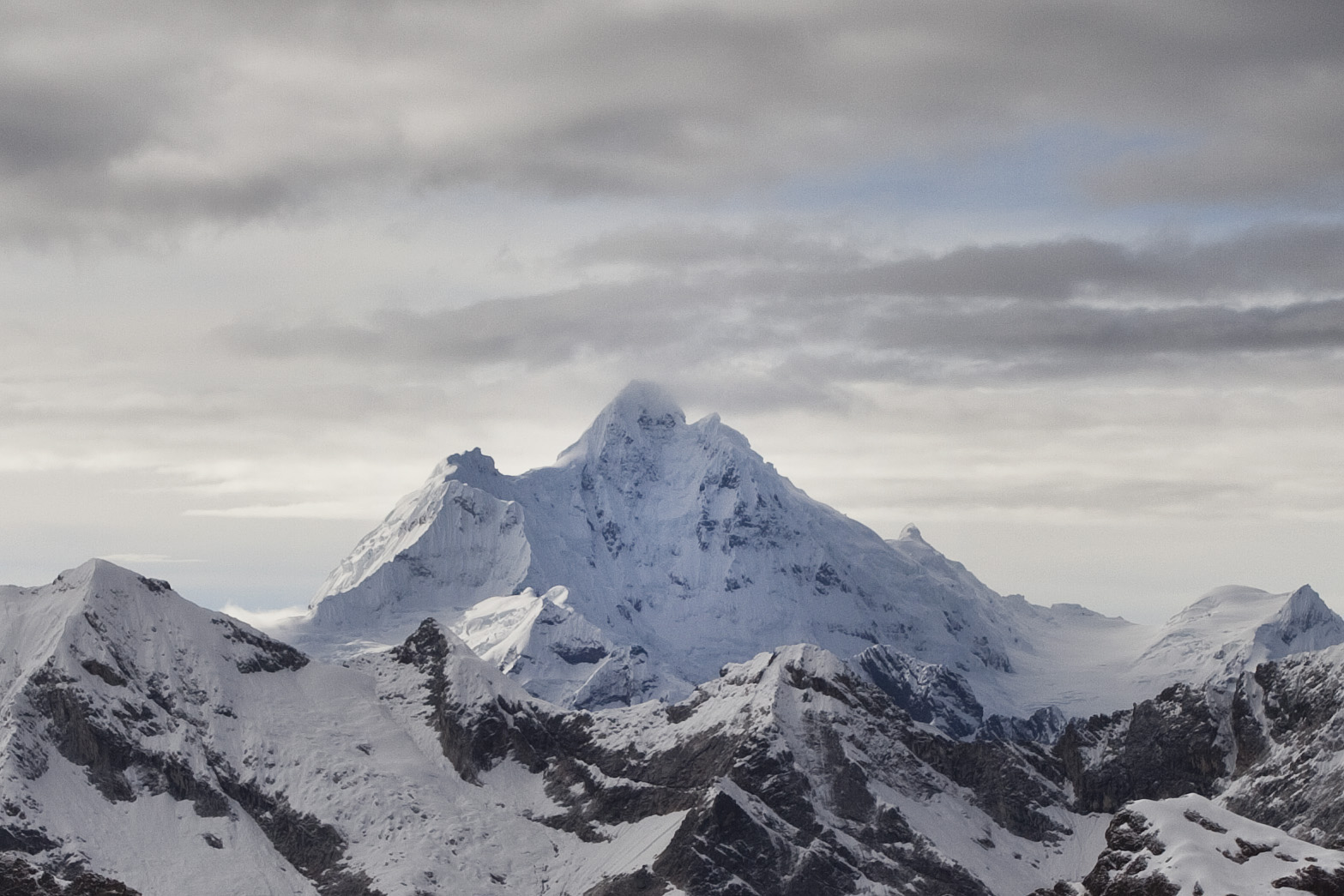

Highest point
- Elevation: 6,369 m (20,896 ft)
- Prominence: 1,633 m (5,358 ft)
- Listing: Ultra
- Coordinates: 9°30′57″S 77°18′36″W

Geography
- Location within Peru
- Location: Peru
- Parent range: Cordillera Blanca (Andes)

Climbing
- First ascent: 7 July 1952 by Lionel Terray, Cees G. Egeler and Tom de Booy

Huantsán, Huantsan (modern Quechua orthography: Wantsan) or Tunsho is a mountain in the Andes of Peru. It is located in Ancash Region and is part of the Cordillera Blanca mountain range, a sub-range of the Andes. It has four peaks, with a maximum elevation of 6,369 metres (20,896 ft) above sea level.

== Geography ==
Huantsán is located in the boundary of the provinces of Huaraz and Huari, in the region of Ancash. It belongs to the southern part of the Cordillera Blanca and is the only elevation that exceeds 6000m in that area. Huantsán consists of four peaks: Huantsán Norte (6.113m), Huantsán (6.395m), Huantsán Oeste (6.270m) and Huantsán Sur (5.913m).

Huantsán is protected inside Huascarán National Park.

== Climbing ==
Huantsán is one of the less climbed of all 6000m peaks in the Cordillera Blanca. All routes to the main summit are technically committing, the easier being the north-northwest ridge rated D+/TD-, involving a traverse from the nearby Huantsán Norte down a steep narrow snow ridge to a saddle at 6,050 metres (19,849 ft) and a final section of steep snow and ice. More difficult is the west face, rated TD and requiring climbing on steep rock, mixed ground and bulges of water ice. Even more difficult is the northeast ridge, rated TD+ and climbed on the 17 August 1974 in two weeks by a party of thirteen people using fixed ropes.

== History ==
In 1945, an avalanche coming from Huantsán buried the village of Chavín, killing about 500 people.

The first ascent to Huantsán was performed by the team of Tom de Booy, Cees Egeler and Lionel Terray in 1952, who reached the main summit via the north summit.

Huantsán and the Cordillera Blanca are protected within Huascarán National Park since 1975.

== See also ==
- Cashan
- Shacsha
- Uruashraju
- Huamashraju
- List of mountains in the Andes
- List of Ultras of South America
