= Pampas (disambiguation) =

The Pampas are fertile South American lowlands.

Pampas may also refer to:

== Animals and plants ==
- Pampas cat, a small wild cat
- Pampas deer, a deer
- Pampas fox, a medium-sized zorro
- Pampas meadowlark, a bird
- Cortaderia selloana, pampas grass, a flowering plant
- Salpichroa origanifolia, pampas lily-of-the-valley, a flowering plant

== Places ==
- Pampas, Peru
- Pampas District, Huaraz, Peru
- Pampas District, Pallasca, Peru
- Pampas District, Tayacaja, Peru
- Ostrobothnia, a region of Finland locally known as Pampas
- Pampas, Queensland, a locality in the Toowoomba Region, Australia
- Cortland Township, DeKalb County, Illinois, U.S., formerly Pampas Township

== Other uses ==
- Pampas XV, an Argentine rugby union team.
- Aurinel Pampas, a character in Nemesis by Isaac Asimov

== See also ==
- Pampa (disambiguation)
