= Ciro Gálvez =

Peruvian lawyer, songwriter, professor and politician

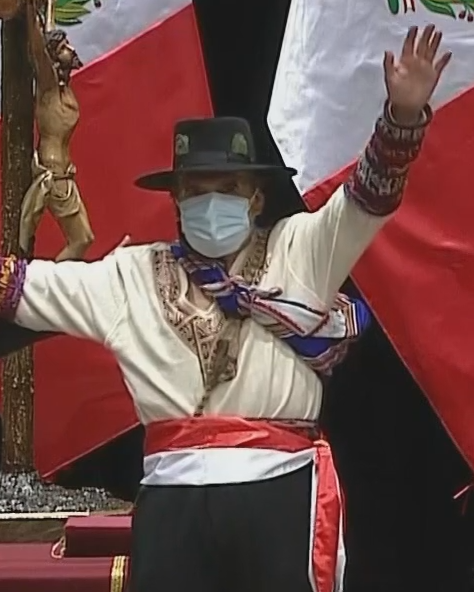

17th Minister of Culture
- In office 29 July 2021 – 6 October 2021
- President: Pedro Castillo
- Prime Minister: Guido Bellido
- Preceded by: Alejandro Neyra
- Succeeded by: Gisela Ortiz

Personal details
- Born: Ciro Alfredo Gálvez Herrera; 16 January 1949 (age 77) Surcubamba, Tayacaja Province, Huancavelica, Peru
- Party: National United Renaissance

Ciro Alfredo Gálvez Herrera (born 16 January 1949 in Surcubamba, Tayacaja Province, Huancavelica) is a Peruvian lawyer, songwriter, professor of Quechua and politician. As candidate of the Andean Renaissance party, he ran unsuccessfully in the Peruvian presidential elections in 2001 and 2006 and 2021. Gálvez also held the 17th Minister of Culture under the presidency of Pedro Castillo

== Life ==
Ciro Gálvez studied law at the National University of San Marcos in Lima and graduated as lawyer. He studied also Quechua at the INSUC Institute (Instituto Superior de Quechua) in Lima. He opened a notary office in Huancayo.

In 1993, Ciro Gálvez founded the Andean Renaissance party (Renacimiento Andino). He ran unsuccessfully for President in 2001 and was running as Andean Renaissance's presidential candidate for the 2006 national election. On April 7, 2006, two days before the election, he withdrew from the race unofficially, expressing his support for Lourdes Flores' candidacy, but without presenting a formal resignation and not affecting the ballot. He subsequently received 0.186% of the vote, coming in 15th place. He also ran unsuccessfully for Governor of Huancavelica in the 2002 and 2006 regional elections.

He again ran for President in the 2021 general election under the National United Renaissance, with a conservative platform declaring to be in opposition to LGBT rights. For the election, his ticket included former pastor and businessman Claudio Zolla as his first running-mate, due to a political accord with the New Peru Liberal Party, a libertarian movement led by Zolla. On March 31, 2021, he became a national trend in the networks due to his participation in the electoral debate, where he presented his proposals in Spanish and Quechua.

On March 14, 2021, a source from his party reported that he was admitted to a clinic after testing positive for COVID-19.

He is dean of the Notary College of Junín, Quechua professor – he speaks and sings in Chanka Quechua – and legal assessor of several companies. He is lifelong member of the Inter-American Network of Law Firms and former Professor of Civil Rights at the Los Andes Peruvian University.

Some of his songs such as Kutisaq/Volveré (I will return), Pim wañuchiwachkanchik / Quién nos está matando (Who is killing us) and Iskay pishtaku chawpimpi / Entre dos fuegos (Between two fires) have become popular.
