= Qullqapampa (disambiguation) =

Qullqapampa (Quechua qullqa, qulqa deposit, storehouse, pampa a large plain, hispanicized spellings Colcabamba, Colcapampa, Collcabamba, Collcapampa) may refer to:

- Colcabamba District, Aymaraes, a district in the Aymaraes Province, Apurímac Region, Peru, and its seat
- Colcabamba District, Huaraz, a district in the Huaraz Province, Ancash Region, Peru, and its seat
- Colcabamba District, Tayacaja, a district in the Tayacaja Province, Huancavelica Region, Peru, and its seat
  - Colcabamba, Tayacaja, the capital of Colcabamba District, Tayacaja
- Qullqapampa, an archaeological site in the Cusco Region, Peru
