= Claudio Zolla =

Claudio Alejandro Zolla Suárez (born 8 January 1969) is a Peruvian evangelical pastor, communicator, businessman and political figure. As an advocate for Christian principles and values, he is the founder of "Campeones para Cristo" Church in Peru, "Pro Values National Movement", conservative political party "Peru Nuevo", Corporation Zolla, and urban development project Nueva Lima.

== Biography ==
He was born in the Jesús María District in Lima, Peru, on January 8, 1969 to Pedro Victor Felipe Zolla Castro and Adriana Apolonia Suarez Romarioni.

In 1995, Claudio Zolla founded "Misión Campeones para Cristo". An Evangelical Christian church in the center of Lima with the focus of bringing the youth to know Christ. The ministry grew to 12 different locations across the city of Lima, hosting many Christian conferences and events. Most notably, "Invasion Vida" a yearly event of worship for the younger generations.

On June 13th, 2002 Claudio Zolla organized the "National Day of Values". The event was held in front of the Palace of Justice, Lima where over 60,000 people from various churches and organizations gathered to raise a voice and advocate for christian values in all spheres of society. Among the guest artists, was Christian singer and pastor Marcos Witt.

During these years, Claudio Zolla became known as "El Pastor de Jovenes" or "The Pastor of the Youth" among many Christian circles in the nation.

As an advocate for classical liberalism, Claudio Zolla founded and led the party "Peru Nuevo", a non-registered political party. Alongside his teacher and political scientist Alberto Mansueti, Zolla taught the principles of limited government, free markets, and civil liberties, among other tenets of classical liberalism.

In 2015, Zolla attained press coverage as he confronted President Nicolás Maduro of Venezuela outside the United Nations headquarters in New York City. Engaging in a debate, Maduro mocked Zolla's views on capitalism and invited him over to Venezuela to "learn the truth". To which Zolla retaliated by condemning his socialist ideals and how he governs his nation. The debate ended shortly after as both men parted ways.

For the 2016 Peruvian general election, Zolla announced his candidacy for President of Peru, although he was not able to register his party in order to file his ticket. Subsequently, he signed a political accord with Peru Nation in order to run for First Vice President. With Francisco Diez Canseco Távara as the presidential nominee, the ticket was eventually withdrawn before the election, per decision from the primary candidate .

In 2021 Zolla ran unsuccessfully for Second Vice President with National United Renaissance (RUNA) for the 2021 Peruvian general election. His nomination was signed as part of a political accord with RUNA leader and presidential nominee, Ciro Gálvez.
