= La Merced District =

La Merced District may refer to:

- La Merced District, Aija in Ancash Region, Peru
- La Merced District, Churcampa in Huancavelica Region, Peru
