= Pampas District =

Pampas District may refer to:

- Pampas District, Huaraz
- Pampas District, Pallasca
- Pampas District, Tayacaja
