= Kiswar (disambiguation) =

Kiswar (Quechua for buddleja incana, also spelled queshuar, quishuar, quesuar, quisoar, quisuar, quisuar) may refer to:

- Kiswar (Buddleja incana), a plant
- Kiswar, Ancash, an archaeological site in the Yungay Province, Ancash Region, Peru
- Kiswar (Cusco), a mountain in the Cusco Region, Peru
- Kiswar (Recuay), a mountain in the Recuay Province, Ancash Region, Peru
- Kiswar Lakes, a group of lakes in the La Libertad Region, Peru
- Quishuar District, a district in the Huancavelica Region, Peru
