= Mission Kipi =

- Theatrical release poster
- Misión Kipi
- Directed by: Sonaly Tuesta
- Written by: Sonaly Tuesta
- Produced by: Sonaly Tuesta; Javier Anaya; Martina Sottile
- Cinematography: Wilmer Gutierrez
- Edited by: Mana García
- Music by: Vibe Music
- Production company: Ayni Producciones
- Distributed by: Tondero Distribución
- Release date: March 21, 2024
- Running time: 81 minutes
- Country: Peru
- Language: Spanish

Mission Kipi (Spanish: Misión Kipi) is a 2024 Peruvian documentary film written, co-produced and directed by Sonally Tuesta in her directorial debut. It follows Walter Velásquez and his creation, Kipi, a girl robot whose job is to help the children of Colcabamba continue their studies amid the COVID-19 pandemic.

== Synopsis ==
During the pandemic, rural teacher Walter Velásquez, dedicated to science and technology for years, creates a robot from computer scrap and baptizes it with the name Kipi. Most of Walter's students left school due to COVID-19 pandemic and returned to their communities. Without connectivity or access due to dispersed population centers, Kipi becomes the teacher's assistant and accompanies the educational pilgrimage of its creator, bringing learning to homes and communities.

== Release ==
It premiered on March 21, 2024, in Peruvian theaters.

== Accolades ==
Year	Award / Festival	Category	Recipient	Result	Ref.
2024	11th Trujillo Film Festival	APRECI Jury Awards - Special Mention	Mission Kipi	Won	
2024	11th Huánuco Film Festival	Best Feature Film Category “Cinema Goes to School”	Mission Kipi	Won	
