= Laria =

Laria may refer to:

- Leucoma, a genus of moths
- Laria District, a district in Peru
- Laria language, an Indo-Aryan language of India
