= Yanaorco (Coris-Locroja) =

Mountain in Peru

- Location within Peru

Highest point
- Elevation: 4,400 m (14,400 ft)
- Coordinates: 12°37′10″S 74°27′03″W

Geography
- Location: Peru, Huancavelica Region
- Parent range: Andes

Yanaorco (possibly from in the Quechua spelling Yana Urqu: yana black, urqu mountain, "black mountain") is a mountain in the Andes of Peru which reaches a height of approximately 4,400 m (14,400 ft). It is located in the Huancavelica Region, Churcampa Province, on the border of the districts of Coris and Locroja.
