= Salcahuasi District =

Coordinates: 12.1038°S 74.7516°W

Salcahuasi
- District
- Interactive map of Salcahuasi
- Country: Peru
- Region: Huancavelica
- Province: Tayacaja
- Founded: June 18, 1987
- Capital: Salcahuasi

Government
  - Mayor: Mauro Ruben Inocente Morales

Area
  - Total: 117.98 km^{2} (45.55 sq mi)
- Elevation: 3,150 m (10,330 ft)

Population (2005 census)
  - Total: 3,811
  - Density: 32.30/km^{2} (83.66/sq mi)
- Time zone: UTC-5 (PET)
- UBIGEO: 090715

Salcahuasi District is one of the sixteen districts of the province Tayacaja in Peru.

== Ethnic groups ==
The people in the district are mainly Indigenous citizens of Quechua descent. Quechua is the language which the majority of the population (89.78%) learnt to speak in childhood, 9.69% of the residents started speaking using the Spanish language (2007 Peru Census).
