= Acraquia District =

Coordinates: 12.4068°S 74.9014°W

Acraquia
- District
- Interactive map of Acraquia
- Country: Peru
- Region: Huancavelica
- Province: Tayacaja
- Founded: September 9, 1954
- Capital: Acraquia

Government
  - Mayor: Roger Hermogenes Huaripata Solier

Area
  - Total: 110.27 km^{2} (42.58 sq mi)
- Elevation: 3,287 m (10,784 ft)

Population (2005 census)
  - Total: 5,061
  - Density: 45.90/km^{2} (118.9/sq mi)
- Time zone: UTC-5 (PET)
- UBIGEO: 090703

Acraquia District is one of sixteen districts of the province Tayacaja in Peru.

== Ethnic groups ==
The people in the district are mainly Indigenous citizens of Quechua descent. Quechua is the language which the majority of the population (51.68%) learnt to speak in childhood, 47.98% of the residents started speaking using the Spanish language (2007 Peru Census).
