= Daniel Hernández District =

Coordinates: 12.3901°S 74.8583°W

Daniel Hernández
- District
- Interactive map of Daniel Hernández
- Country: Peru
- Region: Huancavelica
- Province: Tayacaja
- Founded: January 9, 1956
- Capital: Mariscal Cáceres

Government
  - Mayor: Fermin Luis Quispe Chamorro

Area
  - Total: 106.92 km^{2} (41.28 sq mi)
- Elevation: 3,280 m (10,760 ft)

Population (2005 census)
  - Total: 9,745
  - Density: 91.14/km^{2} (236.1/sq mi)
- Time zone: UTC-5 (PET)
- UBIGEO: 090706

Daniel Hernández District is one of sixteen districts of the province Tayacaja in Peru.
