= Llaqta Qulluy (Tayacaja) =

Archaeological site in Peru

- Location: Peru
- Region: Huancavelica Region, Tayacaja Province

Site notes
- Height: 3,960 m (12,990 ft)

Llaqta Qulluy (Quechua llaqta place (village, town, city, country, nation), qulluy to die out, become extinct; to fail, "extinct town", also spelled Llaccta Ccolloy, Llacta Ccolloy, Llactaccolloy) is an archaeological site in Peru on a mountain of that name. It is situated in the Huancavelica Region, Tayacaja Province, Ahuaycha District. The site lies in the community of Llaqta Pata (Llaccta Pata), Vista Alegre, on top of the 3,960-metre-high (12,990 ft) mountain.
