= Churcampa province =

Coordinates: 12.722847°S 74.421214°W

Churcampa
- Province
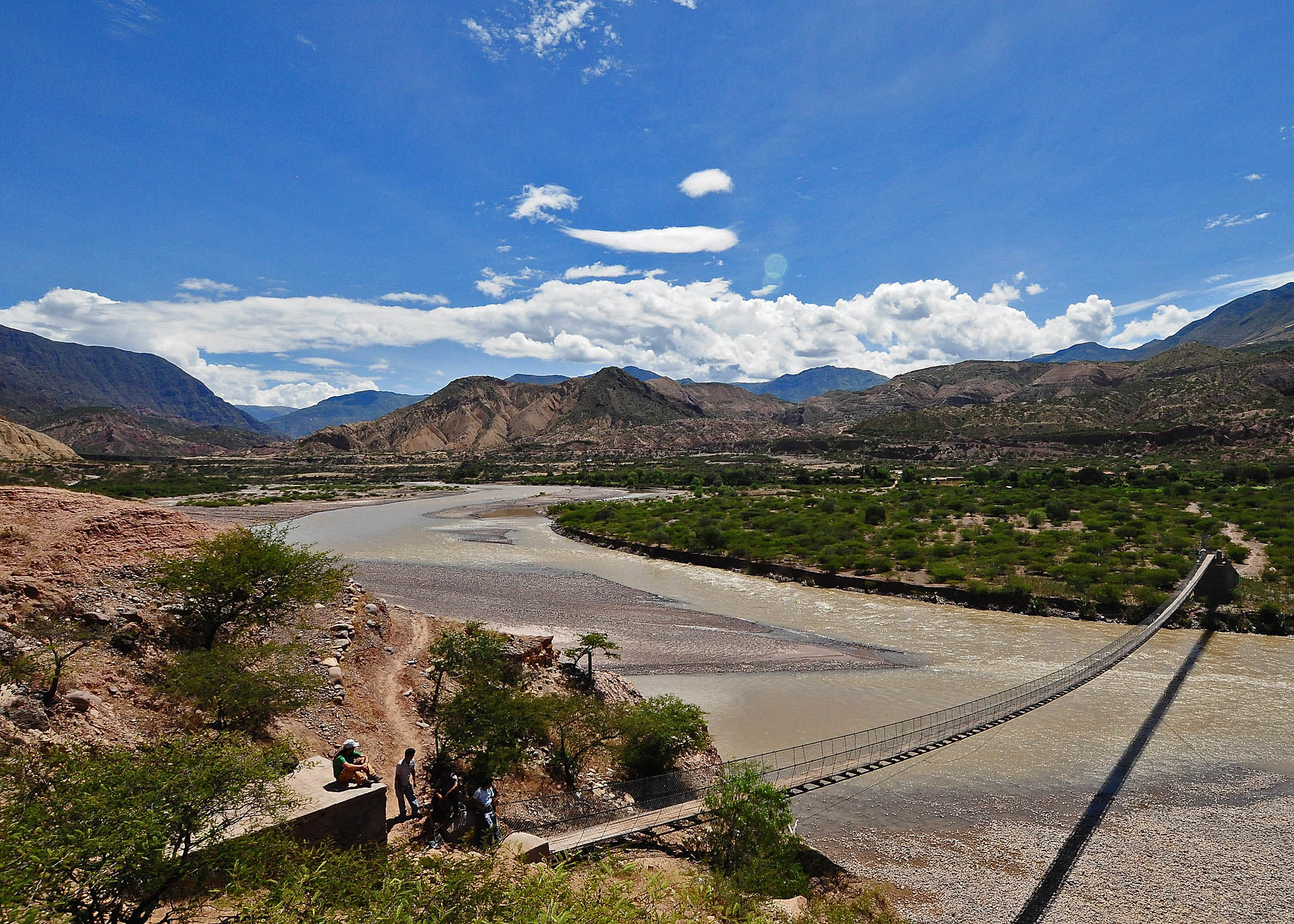
- Footbridge across Mantaro River in Chaypara, La Merced District

- Location of Churcampa in the Huancavelica Region
- Country: Peru
- Region: Huancavelica
- Capital: Churcampa

Government
  - Mayor: Robert Juan Rojas Meza (2007)

Area
  - Total: 1,232.45 km^{2} (475.85 sq mi)

Population
  - Total: 42,755
  - Density: 34.691/km^{2} (89.849/sq mi)
- UBIGEO: 0905

Churcampa is a province located in the Huancavelica Region of Peru. It is one of the seven that make up that region. The capital of the province is Churcampa.

== Boundaries ==
- North: province of Tayacaja
- East: Ayacucho Region
- South: province of Acobamba
- West: province of Huancavelica

== Geography ==
Some of the highest mountains of the province are listed below:

- Allquchayuq
- Artisa
- Chawpi Urqu
- Hamp'atuyuq
- Hamp'atuyuq (Pachamarca)
- Hatun Pampa
- Ichhu Pata
- Ichhu Ukhu
- Luychu Q'asa
- Llaqta Urqu
- Mamacha Urqu
- Muruqucha
- Muyu Urqu
- Ñawpa Llaqta Urqu
- Puka Pampa
- Qiwllaqucha
- Q'illu Urqu
- Q'iru Q'asa
- Saywa
- Suyu Qaqa
- Wisk'achayuq
- Yana P'unqu
- Yana Urqu (Chinchihuasi-Cosme)
- Yana Urqu (Coris-Locroja)
- Yana Willka
- Yuraq Yuraq

== Political division ==
The province is divided into eleven districts, which are:

- Anco (La Esmeralda)
- Chinchihuasi (Chinchihuasi)
- Churcampa (Churcampa)
- El Carmen (Paucarbambilla)
- La Merced (La Merced)
- Lacroja (Locroja)
- Pachamarca (Pachamarca)
- Paucarbamba (Paucarbamba)
- San Miguel de Mayocc (Mayocc)
- San Pedro de Coris (San Pedro de Coris)
- Cosme (Santa Clara de Cosme)

== Ethnic groups ==
The people in the province are mainly Indigenous citizens of Quechua descent. Quechua is the language which the majority of the population (79.11%) learnt to speak in childhood, 20.46% of the residents started speaking using the Spanish language (2007 Peru Census).
