= Gisela Ortiz =

Peruvian human rights activist and politician

Gisela Ortiz Perea
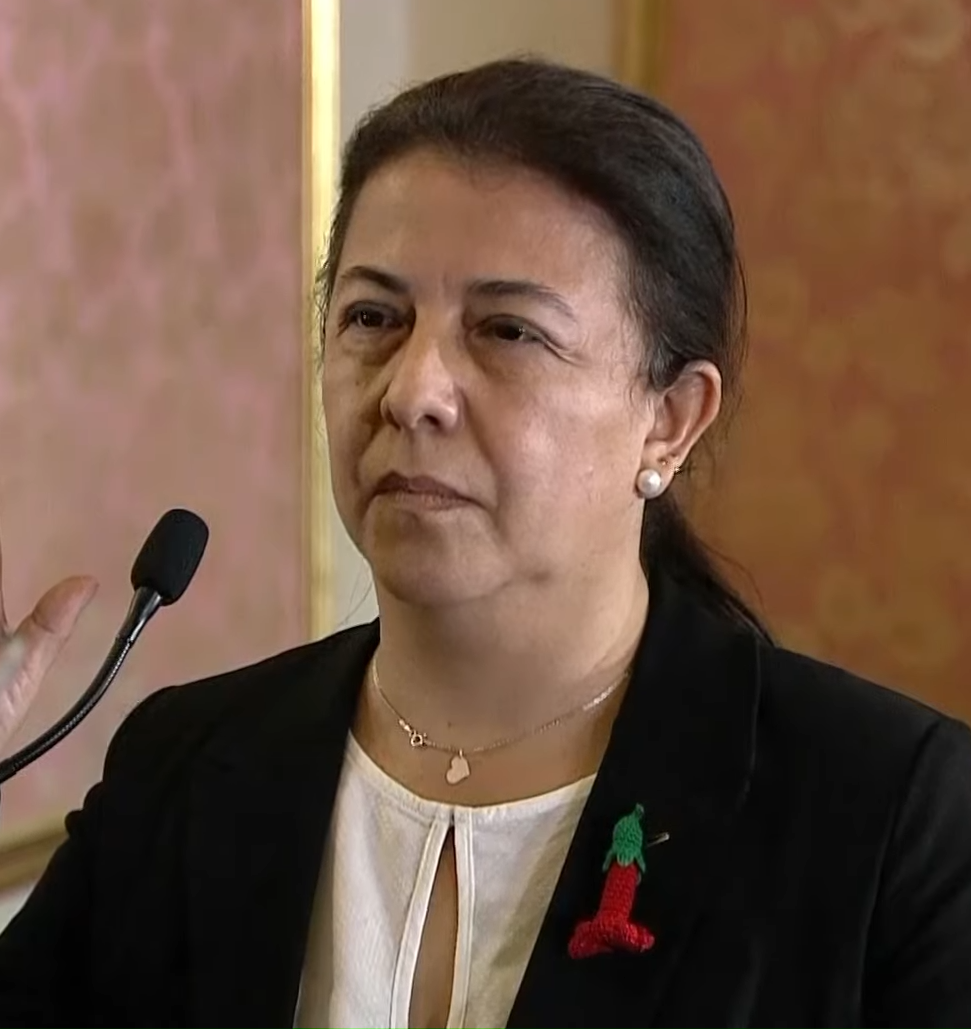

18th Minister of Culture
- In office October 6, 2021 – February 1, 2022
- President: Pedro Castillo
- Preceded by: Ciro Gálvez
- Succeeded by: Alejandro Salas

Personal details
- Education: National University of Education Enrique Guzmán y Valle
- Occupation: Human rights activist and politician

Andrea Gisela Ortiz Perea (born 1972) is a Peruvian human rights activist and politician. She served as minister of culture of Peru from 2021 to 2022.

== Biography ==
Ortiz was born in Chachapoyas, Peru, in 1972. She graduated from the National University of Education Enrique Guzmán y Valle, where she studied business administration.

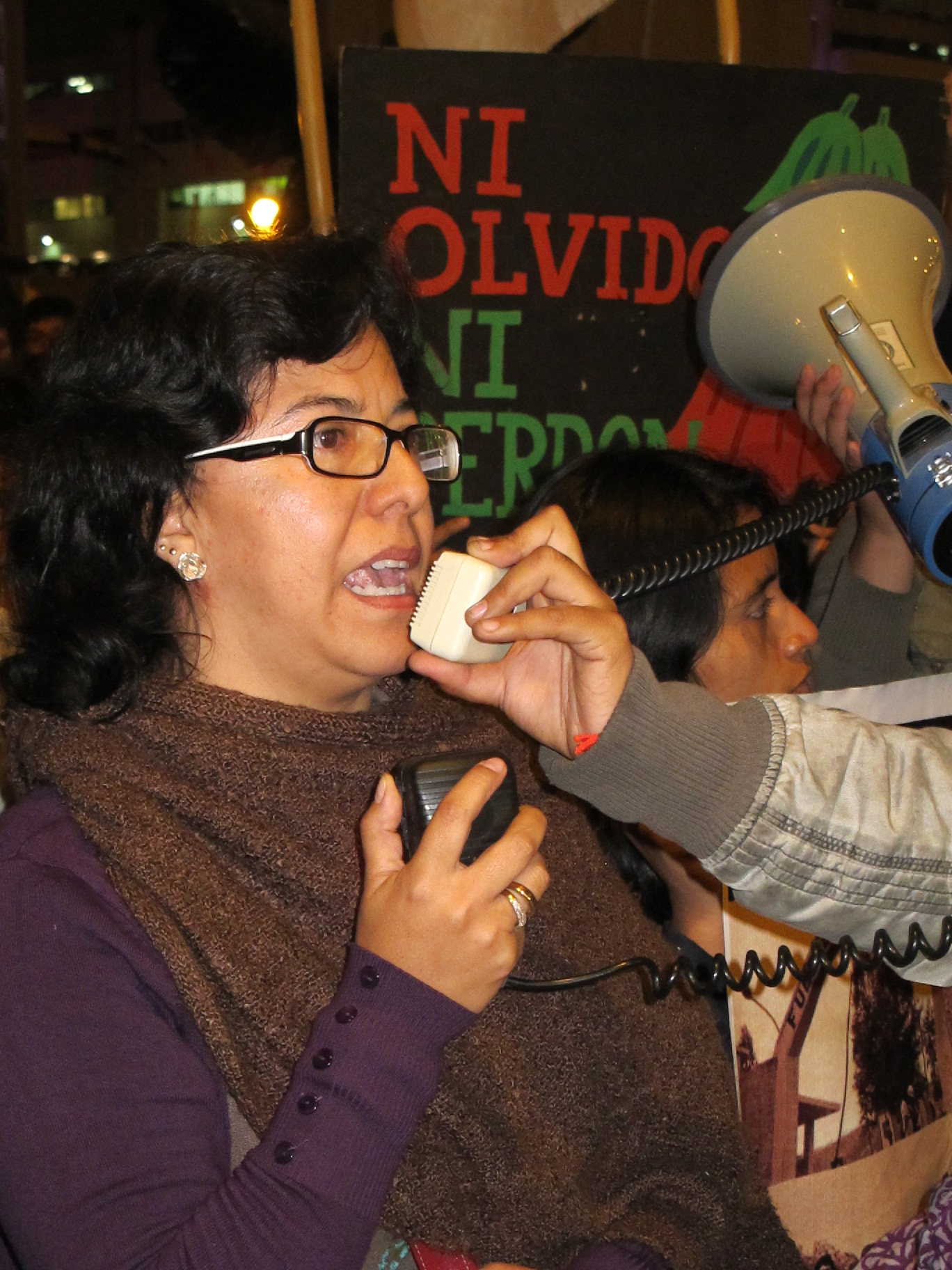
Gisela Ortiz at a protest in 2012.

In 1992, she was designated the spokesperson for the relatives of the victims of the La Cantuta massacre, in which a professor and nine students from the National University of Education Enrique Guzmán y Valle — including her brother Luis Enrique Ortiz Perea — were kidnapped, tortured, and killed by the Grupo Colina, a far-right Peruvian paramilitary group. The La Cantuta massacre is one of the incidents for which former Peruvian President Alberto Fujimori was sentenced to 25 years in prison.

Since 2009, she has served as the director of operations for the Equipo Peruano de Antropología Forense (EPAF), an NGO dedicated to searching for and identifying missing persons.

In October 2021, she was named minister of culture in President Pedro Castillo's government. She served until February 2022, when she stepped down in a cabinet reshuffle.
