= Tintay Puncu District =

Coordinates: 12.1519°S 74.5447°W

Tintay Puncu
- District
- Interactive map of Tintay Puncu
- Country: Peru
- Region: Huancavelica
- Province: Tayacaja
- Founded: October 3, 1984
- Capital: Tintay Puncu

Government
  - Mayor: Nelfa Comun Gavilan

Area
  - Total: 460.32 km^{2} (177.73 sq mi)
- Elevation: 2,350 m (7,710 ft)

Population (2005 census)
  - Total: 3,944
  - Density: 8.568/km^{2} (22.19/sq mi)
- Time zone: UTC-5 (PET)
- UBIGEO: 090718

Tintay Puncu District is one of sixteen districts of the Tayacaja Province in Peru.

== Geography ==
One of the highest peaks of the district is Kuntur Qaqa at approximately 4,600 m (15,100 ft). Other mountains are listed below:

- Hatun Urqu
- Llaqta Qulluy
- Llawi Q'asa
- Mata Qucha
- Muru Qucha
- Patu Qucha
- P’unqu Q’asa
- Silla Q'asa
- Uqi Pastu
- Waka Yupana
- Wanay
- Yana Qucha
- Yuraq Yaku Urqu

== Ethnic groups ==
The people in the district are mainly Indigenous citizens of Quechua descent. Quechua is the language which the majority of the population (94.36%) learnt to speak in childhood, 5.04% of the residents started speaking using the Spanish language (2007 Peru Census).
