= Huaribamba District =

Coordinates: 12.2795°S 74.9382°W

Huaribamba Wari Pampa
- District
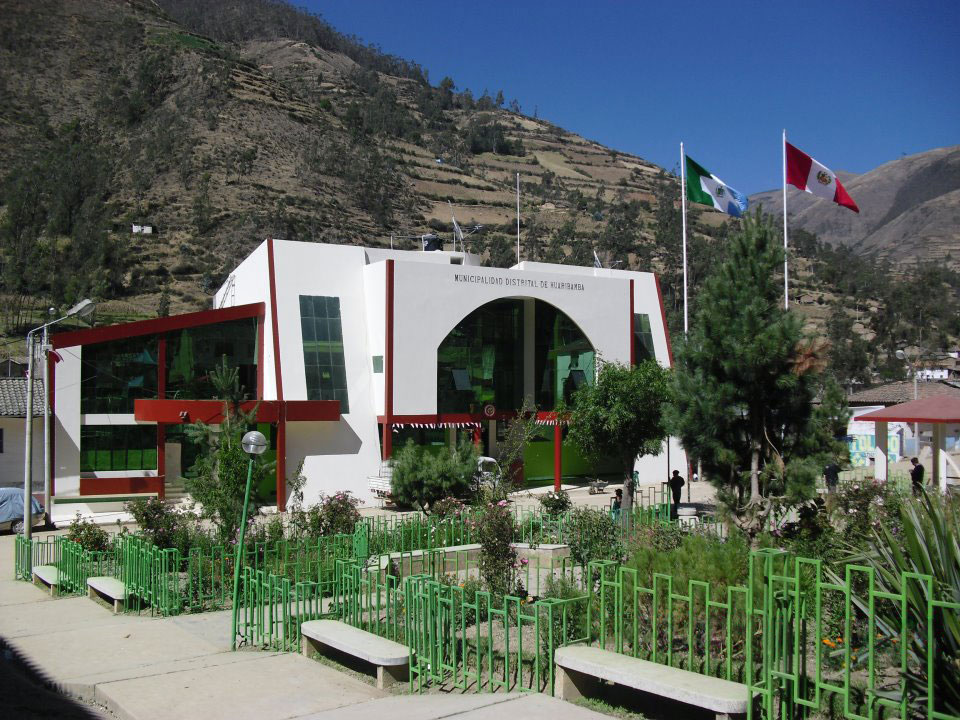
- Huaribamba government building
- Interactive map of Huaribamba
- Country: Peru
- Region: Huancavelica
- Province: Tayacaja
- Capital: Huaribamba

Government
  - Mayor: Nilton Fortunato Minaya Romani

Area
  - Total: 359.93 km^{2} (138.97 sq mi)
- Elevation: 2,996 m (9,829 ft)

Population (2005 census)
  - Total: 7,962
  - Density: 22.12/km^{2} (57.29/sq mi)
- Time zone: UTC-5 (PET)
- UBIGEO: 090709

Huaribamba District is one of sixteen districts of the Tayacaja Province in Peru.

== Geography ==
One of the highest peaks of the district is Yana Urqu at approximately 4,600 m (15,100 ft). Other mountains are listed below:

- Hatun Chaka
- Hatun Wayq'u
- Luychus
- Muchka Urqu
- Rayusqa
- Saqsa Kunka
- Uqsa Q'asa
- Wamani

== Ethnic groups ==
The people in the district are mainly Indigenous citizens of Quechua descent. Quechua is the language which the majority of the population (65.63%) learnt to speak in childhood, 34.07% of the residents started speaking using the Spanish language (2007 Peru Census).
