= Chawpi Urqu (Huancavelica) =

Mountain in Peru

- Location within Peru

Highest point
- Elevation: 4,400 m (14,400 ft)
- Coordinates: 12°28′18″S 74°34′58″W

Geography
- Location: Peru, Huancavelica Region
- Parent range: Andes

Chawpi Urqu (Quechua chawpi middle, center, urqu mountain, "middle mountain", also spelled Chaupi Orjo) is a mountain in the Andes of Peru which reaches a height of approximately 4,400 m (14,400 ft). It is located in the Huancavelica Region, Churcampa Province, Chinchihuasi District.
