= Anco District, Churcampa =

Coordinates: 12.6828°S 74.5874°W

Anco District
- District
- Interactive map of Anco District
- Country: Peru
- Region: Huancavelica
- Province: Churcampa
- Capital: La Esmeralda

Government
  - Mayor: Delfin Huarcaya Palante

Area
  - Total: 275.03 km^{2} (106.19 sq mi)
- Elevation: 2,404 m (7,887 ft)

Population (2005 census)
  - Total: 9,373
  - Density: 34.08/km^{2} (88.27/sq mi)
- Time zone: UTC-5 (PET)
- UBIGEO: 090502

Anco District is one of ten districts of the province Churcampa in Peru.

== Ethnic groups ==
The people in the district are mainly Indigenous citizens of Quechua descent. Quechua is the language which the majority of the population (92.06%) learnt to speak in childhood, 7.49% of the residents started speaking using the Spanish language (2007 Peru Census).

== See also ==
- Luychu Q'asa
