= Ampatuyoc (Churcampa) =

Mountain in Peru

- Location within Peru

Highest point
- Elevation: 4,200 m (13,800 ft)
- Coordinates: 12°40′33″S 74°23′43″W

Geography
- Location: Peru, Huancavelica Region
- Parent range: Andes

Ampatuyoc (possibly from in the Quechua spelling Hamp'atuyuq; hamp'atu frog, -yuq a suffix, "the one with a frog (or frogs)") is a mountain in the Andes of Peru which reaches a height of approximately 4,200 m (13,800 ft). It is located in the Huancavelica Region, Churcampa Province, Churcampa District. A lake named Chinchiqucha lies at its feet.
