= Churcampa District =

Coordinates: 12.7392°S 74.3877°W

Churcampa
- District
- Interactive map of Churcampa
- Country: Peru
- Region: Huancavelica
- Province: Churcampa
- Capital: Churcampa

Government
  - Mayor: Robert Juan Rojas Meza

Area
  - Total: 141.36 km^{2} (54.58 sq mi)
- Elevation: 3,262 m (10,702 ft)

Population (2005 census)
  - Total: 6,323
  - Density: 44.73/km^{2} (115.8/sq mi)
- Time zone: UTC-5 (PET)
- UBIGEO: 090501

Churcampa District is one of ten districts of the province Churcampa in Peru.

== Ethnic groups ==
The people in the district are mainly Indigenous citizens of Quechua descent. Quechua is the language which the majority of the population (62.59%) learnt to speak in childhood, 36.56% of the residents started speaking using the Spanish language (2007 Peru Census).

== See also ==
- Hamp'atuyuq
