= Churcampa =

Coordinates: 12°44′S 74°23′W

Churcampa is a town in Peru. It is the capital of Churcampa District and Churcampa Province in the Huancavelica region.

According to the 2007 Peru Census, it has a population of 2,718.
