= Quello Cocha (Churcampa-Tayacaja) =

Mountain in Peru

- Location within Peru

Highest point
- Elevation: 4,400 m (14,400 ft)
- Coordinates: 12°28′25″S 74°35′31″W

Geography
- Location: Peru, Huancavelica Region
- Parent range: Andes

Quello Cocha or Qillwaqucha (Quechua qillwa, qiwlla, qiwiña gull, qucha lake, "gull lake", also spelled Quellhuacocha) is a mountain at a small lake of that name in the Andes of Peru which reaches a height of approximately 4,400 m (14,400 ft). It is located in the Huancavelica Region, Churcampa Province, Chinchihuasi District, and in the Tayacaja Province, Colcabamba District.

The lake named Qillwaqucha lies southeast of the peak in the Chinchihuasi District at 12°28′37″S 74°35′13″W.
