= Pazos District =

Coordinates: 12.2590°S 75.0704°W

Pazos
- District
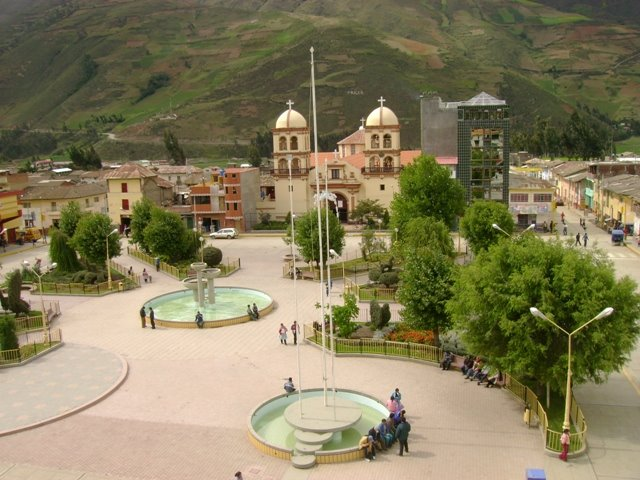
- Interactive map of Pazos
- Country: Peru
- Region: Huancavelica
- Province: Tayacaja
- Founded: January 31, 1951
- Capital: Pazos

Government
  - Mayor: Zacarias Julio Huachos Mendez

Area
  - Total: 152.93 km^{2} (59.05 sq mi)
- Elevation: 3,840 m (12,600 ft)

Population (2005 census)
  - Total: 7,985
  - Density: 52.21/km^{2} (135.2/sq mi)
- Time zone: UTC-5 (PET)
- UBIGEO: 090711

Pazos District is one of sixteen districts of the province Tayacaja in Peru.
