= Acostambo District =

Coordinates: 12.3653°S 75.0548°W

Acostambo Aqus Tampu
- District
- Interactive map of Acostambo
- Country: Peru
- Region: Huancavelica
- Province: Tayacaja
- Founded: January 8, 1912
- Capital: Acostambo

Government
  - Mayor: Javier Romani Villalba

Area
  - Total: 168.06 km^{2} (64.89 sq mi)
- Elevation: 3,600 m (11,800 ft)

Population (2017 census)
  - Total: 4,537
  - Density: 27.00/km^{2} (69.92/sq mi)
- Time zone: UTC-5 (PET)
- UBIGEO: 090702

Acostambo District is one of sixteen districts of the Tayacaja Province in Peru.

== Geography ==
One of the highest peaks of the district is Chikuru Punta at approximately 4,200 m (13,800 ft). Other mountains are listed below:

- Chawpi Urqu
- Hatun Pampa
- Inka Pukyu
- Kiswar Q'asa
- Llama Kancha
- Muyu Urqu
- Phiruruyuq
- Saywa

== Climate ==
Climate data for Acostambo, elevation 3,603 m (11,821 ft), (1991–2020)
| Month | Jan | Feb | Mar | Apr | May | Jun | Jul | Aug | Sep | Oct | Nov | Dec | Year |
|---|---|---|---|---|---|---|---|---|---|---|---|---|---|
| Mean daily maximum °C (°F) | 16.1 (61.0) | 15.9 (60.6) | 15.7 (60.3) | 16.2 (61.2) | 16.5 (61.7) | 16.3 (61.3) | 16.3 (61.3) | 16.5 (61.7) | 16.6 (61.9) | 16.9 (62.4) | 17.5 (63.5) | 16.7 (62.1) | 16.4 (61.6) |
| Mean daily minimum °C (°F) | 4.2 (39.6) | 4.5 (40.1) | 4.3 (39.7) | 2.5 (36.5) | 0.1 (32.2) | −1.7 (28.9) | −2.1 (28.2) | −0.6 (30.9) | 1.6 (34.9) | 2.9 (37.2) | 3.0 (37.4) | 3.9 (39.0) | 1.9 (35.4) |
| Average precipitation mm (inches) | 117.8 (4.64) | 128.4 (5.06) | 103.4 (4.07) | 43.9 (1.73) | 20.7 (0.81) | 9.0 (0.35) | 12.2 (0.48) | 15.2 (0.60) | 37.1 (1.46) | 59.2 (2.33) | 65.6 (2.58) | 104.6 (4.12) | 717.1 (28.23) |
Source: National Meteorology and Hydrology Service of Peru

== See also ==
- Tampu Mach'ay
