= Huachocolpa District, Tayacaja =

Coordinates: 12.0483°S 74.5946°W

Huachocolpa Wachuqullpa
- District
- Interactive map of Huachocolpa
- Country: Peru
- Region: Huancavelica
- Province: Tayacaja
- Founded: January 31, 1951
- Capital: Huachocolpa

Government
  - Mayor: Luis Alberto Hinostroza Huamani

Area
  - Total: 292 km^{2} (113 sq mi)
- Elevation: 2,907 m (9,537 ft)

Population (2005 census)
  - Total: 3,761
  - Density: 12.9/km^{2} (33.4/sq mi)
- Time zone: UTC-5 (PET)
- UBIGEO: 090707

Huachocolpa District is one of sixteen districts of the province Tayacaja in Peru.

== Ethnic groups ==
The people in the district are mainly Indigenous citizens of Quechua descent. Quechua is the language which the majority of the population (93.61%) learnt to speak in childhood, 6.20% of the residents started speaking using the Spanish language (2007 Peru Census).
