= Inka Mach'ay, Peru =

Archaeological site in Peru

Coordinates: 12.3200°S 75.0700°W

Inka Mach'ay
- Interactive map of Inka Mach'ay
- Location: Peru
- Region: Huancavelica Region, Tayacaja Province

Inka Mach'ay (Quechua inka Inca, mach'ay cave, "Inca cave", Hispanicized spelling Incamachay, Inca Machay) is an archaeological site in Peru. It is situated in the Huancavelica Region, Tayacaja Province, Ñahuimpuquio District.

== See also ==
- Tampu Mach'ay
- Pirwayuq
