= San Marcos de Rocchac District =

Coordinates: 12.0939°S 74.8636°W

San Marcos de Rocchac
- District
- Interactive map of San Marcos de Rocchac
- Country: Peru
- Region: Huancavelica
- Province: Tayacaja
- Founded: June 7, 1961
- Capital: San Marcos de Rocchac

Government
  - Mayor: Ernan Hugo Ramon Llulluy

Area
  - Total: 281.71 km^{2} (108.77 sq mi)
- Elevation: 3,182 m (10,440 ft)

Population (2005 census)
  - Total: 3,101
  - Density: 11.01/km^{2} (28.51/sq mi)
- Time zone: UTC-5 (PET)
- UBIGEO: 090716

San Marcos de Rocchac District is one of sixteen districts of the Tayacaja Province in Peru.

== Geography ==
One of the highest peaks of the district is Chawpi Urqu at approximately 4,600 m (15,100 ft). Other mountains are listed below:

- Chuqa
- Chiqlla Pampa
- Ch'awi Urqu
- Hatun Chaya
- Hatun Ukru
- Hisp'a
- Kiswar Tuna
- Kuntur Kuntur
- Luychu Puyku
- Llulluch'a Urqu
- Mantur
- Puka Qucha
- Puywan
- Qalla Qalla
- Q'asa Q'asa
- Rumi Wasi
- T'utura
- Warawniyuq
- Warmi Qucha
- Wayta
- Yana Saywa
- Yuraq Waman Sara

== Ethnic groups ==
The people in the district are mainly Indigenous citizens of Quechua descent. Quechua is the language which the majority of the population (86.57%) learnt to speak in childhood, 13.34% of the residents started speaking using the Spanish language (2007 Peru Census).
