= Cosme District =

Cosme District Distrito de Cosme
- District
- Interactive map of Cosme District
- Coordinates: 12°34′11″S 74°39′24″W
- Country: Peru
- Region: Huancavelica
- Province: Churcampa
- Founded: June 7, 2010
- Capital: Santa Clara de Cosme

Government
  - Mayor: Eduardo Leiva Pumacahua

Area
  - Total: 106.43 km^{2} (41.09 sq mi)
- Elevation: 3,465 m (11,368 ft)

Population (2002)
  - Total: 5,035
  - Density: 47.31/km^{2} (122.5/sq mi)
- Time zone: UTC-5 (PET)
- UBIGEO: 090511

Cosme District is one of eleven districts of the province Churcampa in Peru.

== See also ==
- Yana Urqu
