= San Pedro de Coris District =

San Pedro de Coris District Quris
- District
- Interactive map of San Pedro de Coris District
- Coordinates: 12°36′10″S 74°23′45″W
- Country: Peru
- Region: Huancavelica
- Province: Churcampa
- Founded: May 10, 1955
- Capital: San Pedro de Coris

Government
  - Mayor: Meger Josue Rojas Meza

Area
  - Total: 126.17 km^{2} (48.71 sq mi)
- Elevation: 3,580 m (11,750 ft)

Population (2005 census)
  - Total: 4,561
  - Density: 36.15/km^{2} (93.63/sq mi)
- Time zone: UTC-5 (PET)
- UBIGEO: 090509

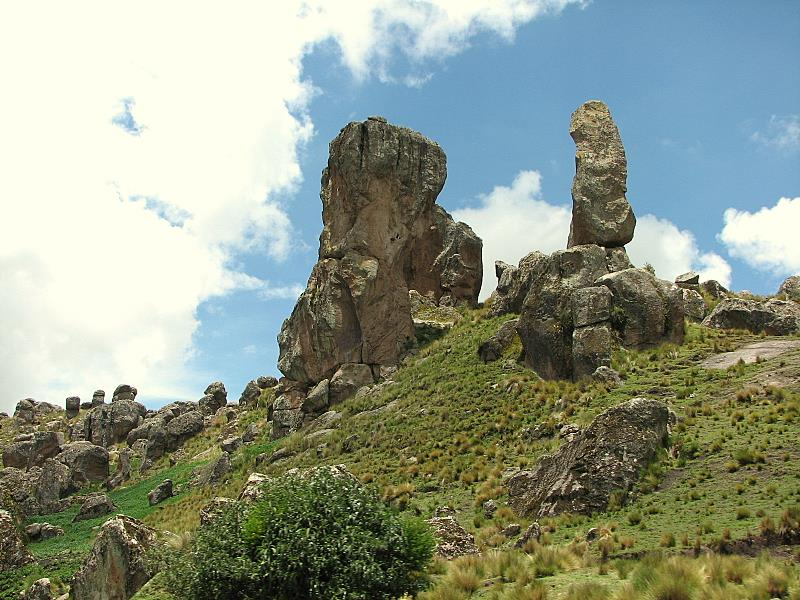
Stones (Piedras) en Huancavelica

San Pedro de Coris District is one of ten districts of the province Churcampa in Peru.

== See also ==
- Allquchayuq
- Yana Urqu
