= Ahuaycha District =

Coordinates: 12.4074°S 74.8914°W

Ahuaycha Awaycha
- District
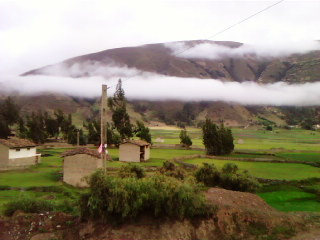
- Landscape of Ahuaycha
- Interactive map of Ahuaycha
- Country: Peru
- Region: Huancavelica
- Province: Tayacaja
- Founded: December 14, 1954
- Capital: Ahuaycha

Government
  - Mayor: Raul Huaman Vasquez

Area
  - Total: 90.96 km^{2} (35.12 sq mi)
- Elevation: 3,280 m (10,760 ft)

Population (2005 census)
  - Total: 5,939
  - Density: 65.29/km^{2} (169.1/sq mi)
- Time zone: UTC-5 (PET)
- UBIGEO: 090704

Ahuaycha District is one of sixteen districts of the province Tayacaja in Peru.

== Ethnic groups ==
The people in the district are mainly Indigenous citizens of Quechua descent. Quechua is the language which the majority of the population (54.30%) learnt to speak in childhood, 45.43% of the residents started speaking using the Spanish language (2007 Peru Census).

== Climate ==
Climate data for Pampas, Ahuaycha, elevation 3,250 m (10,660 ft), (1991–2020)
Month	Jan	Feb	Mar	Apr	May	Jun	Jul	Aug	Sep	Oct	Nov	Dec	Year
Mean daily maximum °C (°F)	17.6 (63.7)	17.3 (63.1)	17.3 (63.1)	17.9 (64.2)	18.1 (64.6)	17.8 (64.0)	17.5 (63.5)	17.9 (64.2)	18.0 (64.4)	18.6 (65.5)	19.0 (66.2)	18.1 (64.6)	17.9 (64.3)
Mean daily minimum °C (°F)	5.8 (42.4)	6.4 (43.5)	5.8 (42.4)	3.7 (38.7)	1.4 (34.5)	−0.3 (31.5)	−0.8 (30.6)	0.5 (32.9)	2.8 (37.0)	4.0 (39.2)	4.3 (39.7)	5.3 (41.5)	3.2 (37.8)
Average precipitation mm (inches)	91.1 (3.59)	95.5 (3.76)	84.5 (3.33)	34.4 (1.35)	15.4 (0.61)	8.1 (0.32)	13.9 (0.55)	15.1 (0.59)	26.5 (1.04)	39.4 (1.55)	44.2 (1.74)	79.2 (3.12)	547.3 (21.55)
Source: National Meteorology and Hydrology Service of Peru

== See also ==
- Llaqta Qulluy
