= Locroja District =

District in Peru

Coordinates: 12.7403°S 74.4417°W

Locroja
- District
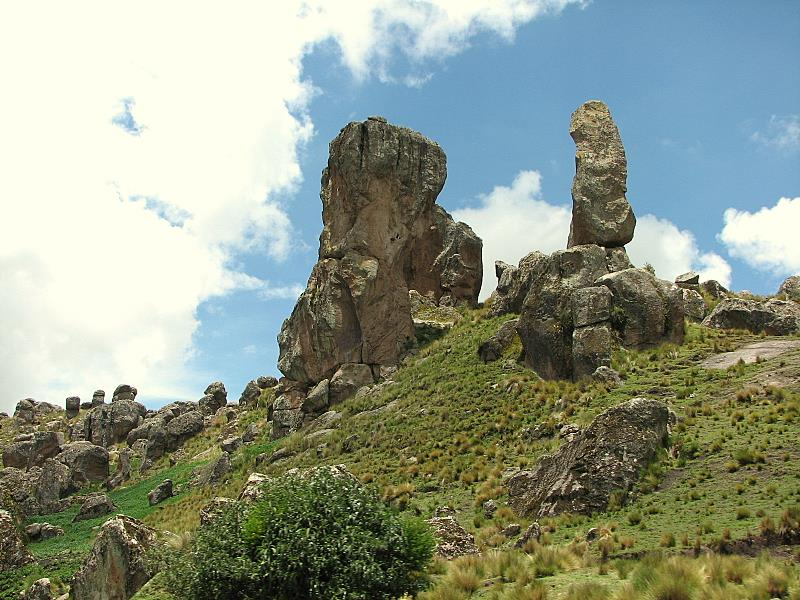
- Interactive map of Locroja
- Country: Peru
- Region: Huancavelica
- Province: Churcampa
- Founded: January 21, 1875; 151 years ago
- Capital: Locroja

Government
  - Mayor: German Quispe Yangali

Area
  - Total: 76.76 km^{2} (29.64 sq mi)
- Elevation: 3,379 m (11,086 ft)

Population (2005 census)
  - Total: 4,930
  - Density: 64.2/km^{2} (166/sq mi)
- Time zone: UTC-5 (PET)
- UBIGEO: 090506

Locroja District is one of ten districts of the Churcampa Province in Peru.

== Geography ==
One of the highest peaks of the district is Hatun Q'asa at approximately 4,400 m (14,400 ft). Other mountains are listed below:

- Allquchayuq
- Awqapa Tiyana
- Ichhu Urqu
- Llaqta Pata
- Yana Urqu

== Ethnic groups ==
The people in the district are mainly Indigenous citizens of Quechua descent. Quechua is the language which the majority of the population (85.31%) learnt to speak in childhood, 14.57% of the residents started speaking using the Spanish language (2007 Peru Census).
