= Viscachayoc (Huancavelica) =

Mountain in Peru

- Location within Peru

Highest point
- Elevation: 4,200 m (13,800 ft)
- Coordinates: 12°29′03″S 74°35′35″W

Geography
- Location: Peru, Huancavelica Region
- Parent range: Andes

Viscachayoc or Wisk'achayuq (Quechua wisk'acha viscacha -yuq a suffix, "the one with the viscachas", also spelled Viscachayoc) is a mountain in the Andes of Peru which reaches a height of approximately 4,200 m (13,800 ft). It is located in the Huancavelica Region, Churcampa Province, Chinchihuasi District.
