= Yana Orjo (Chinchihuasi-Cosme) =

Mountain in Peru

- Location within Peru

Highest point
- Elevation: 4,400 m (14,400 ft)
- Coordinates: 12°32′08″S 74°36′44″W

Geography
- Location: Peru, Huancavelica Region
- Parent range: Andes

Yana Orjo (possibly from in the Quechua spelling Yana Urqu; yana black, urqu mountain, "black mountain") is a mountain in the Andes of Peru which reaches a height of approximately 4,400 m (14,400 ft). It is located in the Huancavelica Region, Churcampa Province, on the border of the districts of Chinchihuasi and Cosme.
