= Pachamarca District =

Coordinates: 12.5154°S 74.5263°W

Pachamarca Pachamarka
- District
- Interactive map of Pachamarca
- Country: Peru
- Region: Huancavelica
- Province: Churcampa
- Founded: April 23, 1965
- Capital: Pachamarca

Government
  - Mayor: Cirilo Barros Herrera

Area
  - Total: 160.06 km^{2} (61.80 sq mi)
- Elevation: 2,730 m (8,960 ft)

Population (2005 census)
  - Total: 3,007
  - Density: 18.79/km^{2} (48.66/sq mi)
- Time zone: UTC-5 (PET)
- UBIGEO: 090510

Pachamarca District is one of ten districts of the province Churcampa in Peru.

== Ethnic groups ==
The people in the district are mainly Indigenous citizens of Quechua descent. Quechua is the language which the majority of the population (92.55%) learnt to speak in childhood, 6.65% of the residents started speaking using the Spanish language (2007 Peru Census).

== See also ==
- Hamp'atuyuq
