= Pirwayuq =

Archaeological site in Peru

- Interactive map of Pirwayuq
- Location: Peru
- Region: Huancavelica Region, Tayacaja Province

Site notes
- Height: 3,900 metres (12,795 ft)

Pirwayuq (Quechua pirwa deposit / the planet Jupiter, -yuq a suffix to indicate ownership, "the one with a deposit", Hispanicized spelling Pirhuayoc) is an archaeological site in Peru. It is situated in the Huancavelica Region, Tayacaja Province, Laria District. The site lies on top of the 3,900-metre-high (12,795 ft) mountain Pirwayuq.

== See also ==
- Inka Mach'ay
- Tampu Mach'ay
