= San Miguel de Mayocc District =

Coordinates: 12.8056°S 74.3899°W

San Miguel de Mayocc Mayuq
- District
- Interactive map of San Miguel de Mayocc
- Country: Peru
- Region: Huancavelica
- Province: Churcampa
- Founded: June 22, 1962
- Capital: Mayocc

Government
  - Mayor: Apolonio Maximo Sotomayor Zambrano

Area
  - Total: 37.86 km^{2} (14.62 sq mi)
- Elevation: 2,212 m (7,257 ft)

Population (2005 census)
  - Total: 897
  - Density: 23.7/km^{2} (61.4/sq mi)
- Time zone: UTC-5 (PET)
- UBIGEO: 090508

San Miguel de Mayocc District is one of ten districts of the province Churcampa in Peru.
