= Allcochayoc =

Mountain in Peru

- Location within Peru

Highest point
- Elevation: 4,400 m (14,400 ft)
- Coordinates: 12°37′29″S 74°26′23″W

Geography
- Location: Peru, Huancavelica Region
- Parent range: Andes

Allcochayoc (possibly from in the Quechua spelling Allquchayuq; allqu dog, -cha, -yuq suffixes, "the one with a little dog (or little dogs)") is a mountain in the Andes of Peru which reaches a height of approximately 4,400 m (14,400 ft). It is located in the Huancavelica Region, Churcampa Province, on the border of the districts of Coris and Locroja District.
