= Quello Cocha (Huancavelica) =

Mountain in Peru

- Location within Peru

Highest point
- Elevation: 4,000 m (13,000 ft)
- Coordinates: 12°28′37″S 74°37′59″W

Geography
- Location: Peru, Huancavelica Region
- Parent range: Andes

Quello Cocha or Q'illuqucha (Quechua q'illu yellow, qucha lake, "yellow lake", also spelled Quellococha) is a mountain in the Andes of Peru which reaches a height of approximately 4,000 m (13,000 ft). It is located in the Huancavelica Region, Tayacaja Province, Colcabamba District.
