= Ñahuimpuquio District =

Coordinates: 12.3291°S 75.0699°W

Ñahuimpuquio Ñawinpukyu
- District
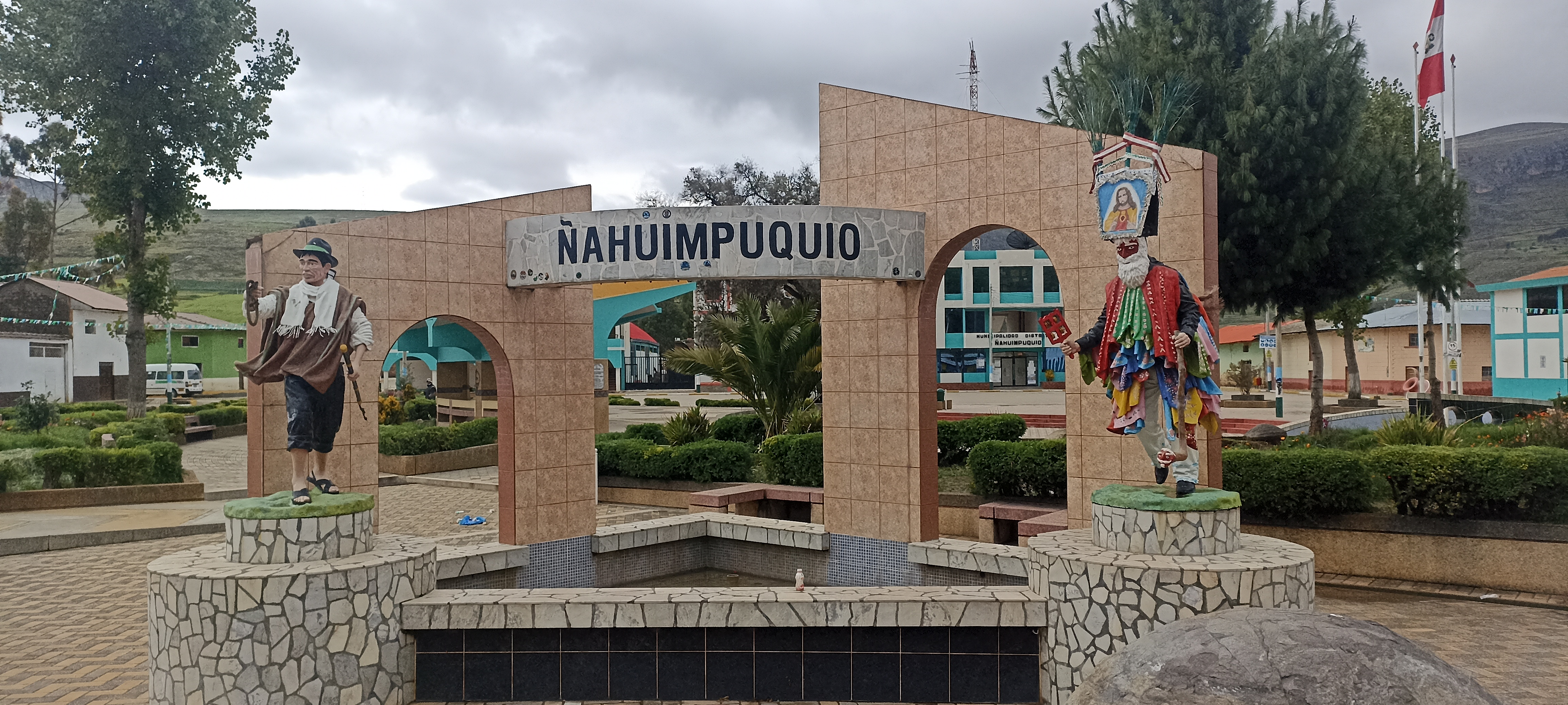
- Main square in the Ñahuimpuquio District
- Interactive map of Ñahuimpuquio
- Country: Peru
- Region: Huancavelica
- Province: Tayacaja
- Founded: November 6, 1903
- Capital: Ñahuimpuquio

Government
  - Mayor: Albino Misael Romero Roca

Area
  - Total: 67.39 km^{2} (26.02 sq mi)
- Elevation: 3,630 m (11,910 ft)

Population (2005 census)
  - Total: 2,599
  - Density: 38.57/km^{2} (99.89/sq mi)
- Time zone: UTC-5 (PET)
- UBIGEO: 090710

Ñahuimpuquio District (Quechua Ñawinpukyu) is one of sixteen districts of the province Tayacaja in Peru.

== See also ==
- Inka Mach'ay
