= Chinchihuasi District =

Coordinates: 12.5185°S 74.5478°W

Chinchihuasi Chinchi Wasi
- District
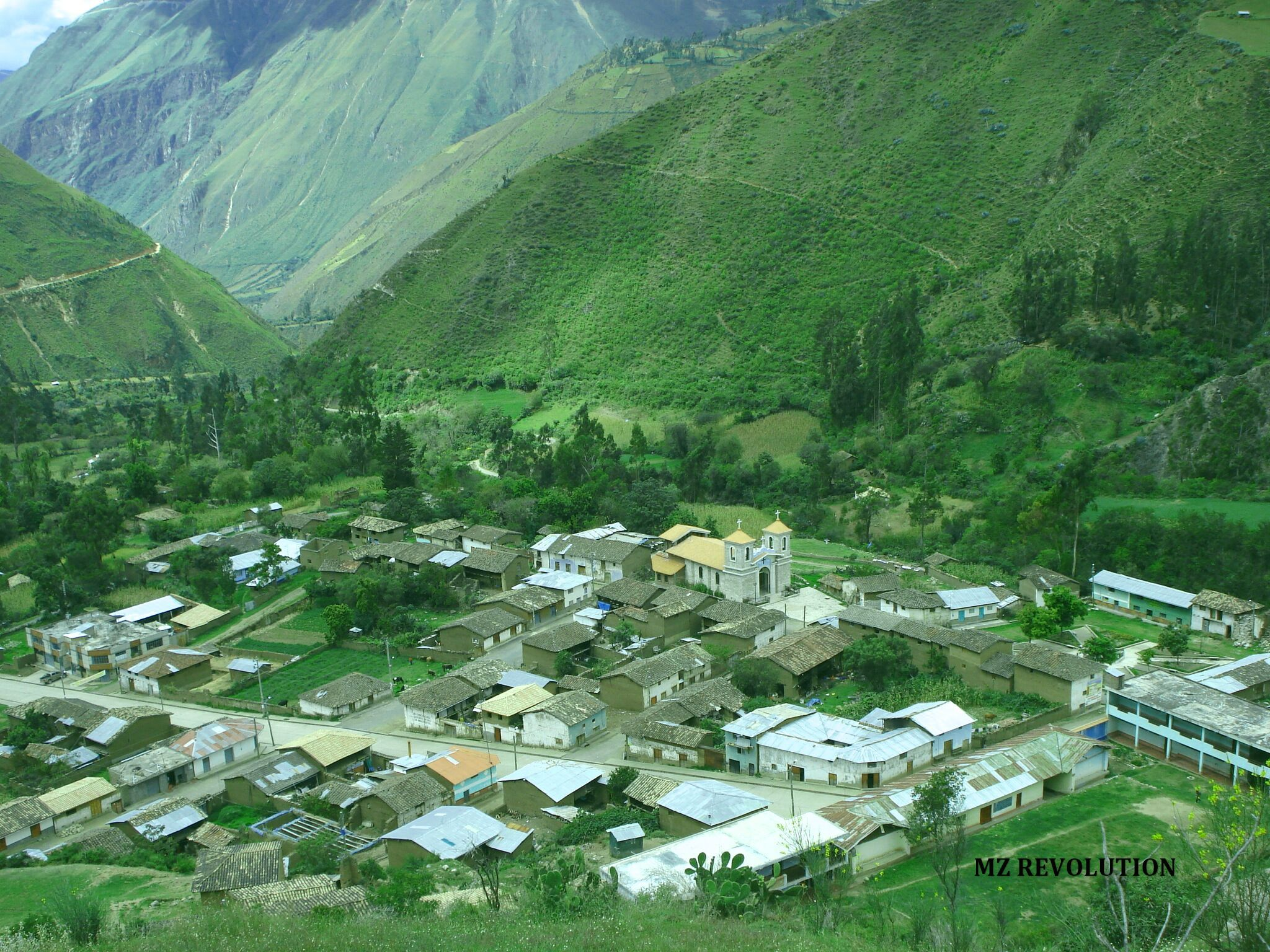
- Chinchihuasi
- Interactive map of Chinchihuasi
- Country: Peru
- Region: Huancavelica
- Province: Churcampa
- Founded: January 11, 1962
- Capital: Chinchihuasi

Government
  - Mayor: Miguel Abregu Torre

Area
  - Total: 171.68 km^{2} (66.29 sq mi)
- Elevation: 2,800 m (9,200 ft)

Population (2005 census)
  - Total: 3,935
  - Density: 22.92/km^{2} (59.36/sq mi)
- Time zone: UTC-5 (PET)
- UBIGEO: 090503

Chinchihuasi or Chinchi Wasi (Quechua chinchi a kind of chili pepper, wasi house, "chili pepper house") is one of ten districts of the Churcampa Province in Peru.

== Geography ==
One of the highest peaks of the district is Qiwllaqucha at approximately 4,400 m (14,400 ft). Other mountains are listed below:

- Artisa
- Chawpi Urqu
- Ch'aki Qucha
- Ch'iqullu
- Hatun Pampa
- Muyu Urqu
- Ñaqch'a Ñaqch'a
- Qasqa Rumi
- Q'iru Q'asa
- T'uru Rumi
- Wisk'achayuq
- Yana Urqu

== Ethnic groups ==
The people in the district are mainly Indigenous citizens of Quechua descent. Quechua is the language which the majority of the population (91.46%) learnt to speak in childhood, 8.08% of the residents started speaking using the Spanish language (2007 Peru Census).
