= Luychujasa =

Mountain in Peru

- Location within Peru

Highest point
- Elevation: 4,400 m (14,400 ft)
- Coordinates: 12°34′59″S 74°33′51″W

Geography
- Location: Peru, Huancavelica Region
- Parent range: Andes

Luychujasa (possibly from the Quechua spelling Luychu Q'asa; luychu, taruka, deer, q'asa mountain pass, "deer pass") is a mountain in the Andes of Peru which reaches a height of approximately 4,400 m (14,400 ft). It is located in the Huancavelica Region, Churcampa Province, Anco District. A small lake named Yanacocha (Quechua for "black lake") lies at its feet.
