= Tampu Mach'ay, Huancavelica =

Archaeological site in Peru

Tampu Mach'ay
- Location: Peru
- Region: Huancavelica Region, Tayacaja Province

Site notes
- Height: 3,400 metres (11,155 ft)

Tampu Mach'ay or Tampumach'ay (Quechua tampu inn, guest house, mach'ay cave, "guest house cave", Hispanicized spelling Tambomachay) is an archaeological site in Peru. It is located in the Huancavelica Region, Tayacaja Province, Acostambo District. Tampu Mach'ay is situated near the main square of Acostambo at an elevation of about 3,400 metres (11,155 ft).

== See also ==
- Inka Mach'ay
- Pirwayuq
