= El Carmen District, Churcampa =

Coordinates: 12.7272°S 74.4810°W

El Carmen District
- District
- Interactive map of El Carmen District
- Country: Peru
- Region: Huancavelica
- Province: Churcampa
- Founded: June 10, 1955
- Capital: Paucarbambilla

Government
  - Mayor: Remigio Ñahui Ccora

Area
  - Total: 73.12 km^{2} (28.23 sq mi)
- Elevation: 3,114 m (10,217 ft)

Population (2005 census)
  - Total: 3,195
  - Density: 43.70/km^{2} (113.2/sq mi)
- Time zone: UTC-5 (PET)
- UBIGEO: 090504

El Carmen District is one of ten districts of the province Churcampa, in Peru.

== Ethnic groups ==
The people in the district are mainly Indigenous citizens of Quechua descent. Quechua is the language which the majority of the population (85.81%) learnt to speak in childhood, 13.77% of the residents started speaking using the Spanish language (2007 Peru Census).
