= Pampa (disambiguation) =

The Pampas are fertile South America lowlands.

Pampa or La Pampa may also refer to:

== Places ==
=== United States ===
- Bena, California, formerly Pampa, an unincorporated area
- Pampa micropolitan area, Texas
  - Pampa, Texas, a city
    - Pampa Army Air Field, a World War II airfield near Pampa, Texas
- Pampa, Virginia, an unincorporated community

=== Elsewhere ===
- La Pampa Province, Argentina
- La Pampa, Córdoba, Argentina, a village
- Pampã River, Minas Gerais, Brazil
- Pamba River, also Pampa River, Kerala, India
- Pampa Sarovar, a lake near Hampi, India
- La Pampa District, Peru
- La Pampa, Peru
- Pampa Island, Palmer Archipelago, Antarctica
- Pampa Passage, adjoining Pampa Island

== People ==
- Adikavi Pampa (902–975), Kannada language poet
- Okinka Pampa (died 1930, a queen-priestess of the Bijagos of Orango, Guinea-Bissau

== Other uses ==
- La Pampa (film), known in English as Block Pass, a 2024 French film
- Pampa Award, a literary award in the Indian state of Karnataka
- Pampa Kampana, two characters in Victory City, a 2023 novel by Salman Rushdie
- FMA IA-63 Pampa, a jet training aircraft
- Pampa Energía, an Argentine energy company
- Pampa Film, an Argentine film production company active in the 1930s and 1940s
- Ford Pampa, a coupe utility manufactured by Ford do Brasil
- Pampa (bird), a genus of hummingbird
- Pampa sheep, a sheep breed
- Parallel artificial membrane permeability assay (PAMPA), in medicinal chemistry
- Pampa Oilers, a former minor league baseball team based in Pampa, Texas

== See also ==
- Federal University of Pampa, also known as Unipampa, a public university in the state of Rio Grande do Sul, Brazil
- Pampas (disambiguation)
- Pampers, a brand of baby and toddler products
