= Pampas District, Tayacaja =

Pampas
- District
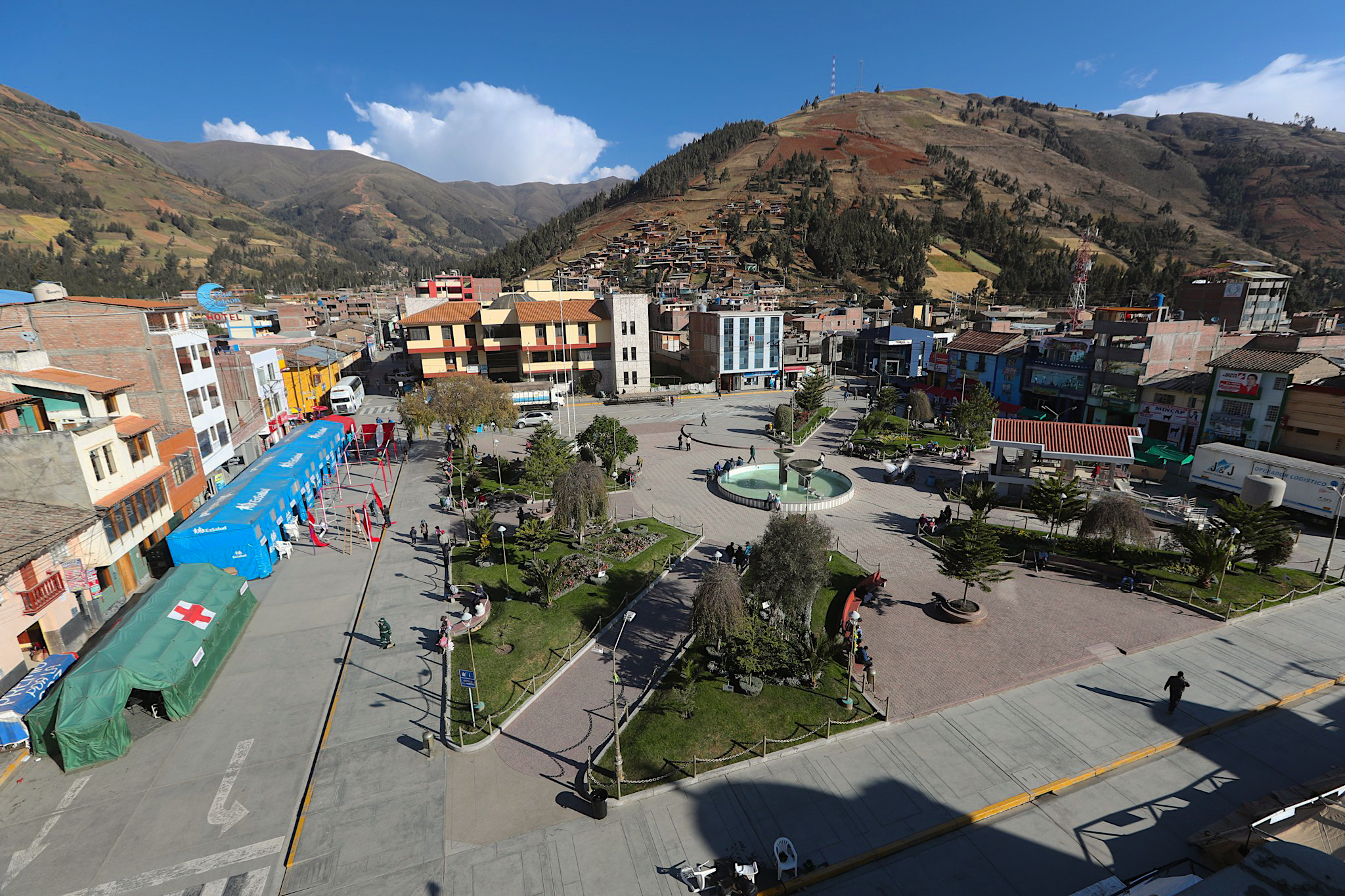
- Pampas in 2018

- Location of Pampas in the Tayacaja province
- Coordinates: 12°23.4′S 74°52.0′W
- Country: Peru
- Region: Huancavelica
- Province: Tayacaja
- Capital: Pampas

Government
  - Mayor: Jesús Americo Monge Abad

Area
  - Total: 109.07 km^{2} (42.11 sq mi)
- Elevation: 3,276 m (10,748 ft)

Population (2005 census)
  - Total: 12,269
  - Density: 112.49/km^{2} (291.34/sq mi)
- Time zone: UTC-5 (PET)
- UBIGEO: 090701

Pampas District is one of sixteen districts of the province Tayacaja in Peru.
