= Laria District =

Coordinates: 12.5612°S 75.0369°W

Laria
- District
- Interactive map of Laria
- Country: Peru
- Region: Huancavelica
- Province: Huancavelica
- Founded: June 23, 1962
- Capital: Laria

Government
  - Mayor: Urbano Cuicapuza Huamancaja

Area
  - Total: 78.45 km^{2} (30.29 sq mi)
- Elevation: 3,861 m (12,667 ft)

Population (2005 census)
  - Total: 1,391
  - Density: 17.73/km^{2} (45.92/sq mi)
- Time zone: UTC-5 (PET)
- UBIGEO: 090109

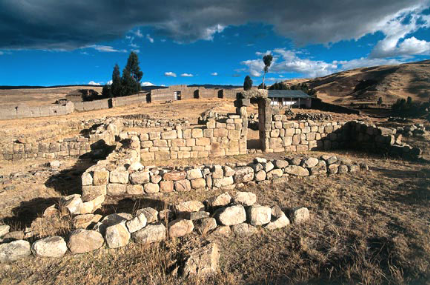

Laria District is one of nineteen districts of the province Huancavelica in Peru.

== Ethnic groups ==
The people in the district are mainly Indigenous citizens of Quechua descent. Quechua is the language which the majority of the population (64.37%) learnt to speak in childhood, 34.82% of the residents started speaking using the Spanish language (2007 Peru Census).

== See also ==
- Pirwayuq
