= Quishuar District =

Coordinates: 12.2439°S 74.7774°W

Quishuar Kiswar
- District
- Interactive map of Quishuar
- Country: Peru
- Region: Huancavelica
- Province: Tayacaja
- Founded: March 6, 1957
- Capital: Quishuar

Government
  - Mayor: José Rodolfo Acevedo Segura

Area
  - Total: 31.54 km^{2} (12.18 sq mi)
- Elevation: 3,130 m (10,270 ft)

Population (2005 census)
  - Total: 1,023
  - Density: 32.44/km^{2} (84.01/sq mi)
- Time zone: UTC-5 (PET)
- UBIGEO: 090713

Quishuar District is one of sixteen districts of the province Tayacaja in Peru.

Its Quechua name kiswar is the name of the tree Buddleja incana.

== Ethnic groups ==
The people in the district are mainly Indigenous citizens of Quechua descent. Quechua is the language which the majority of the population (87.40%) learnt to speak in childhood, 12.60% of the residents started speaking using the Spanish language (2007 Peru Census).

== History ==
The Quishuar district was created on March 6, 1957, by law No.12816, during the government of President Manuel Prado Ugarteche.
