= La Merced District, Churcampa =

Coordinates: 12.7882°S 74.3589°W

La Merced District
- District
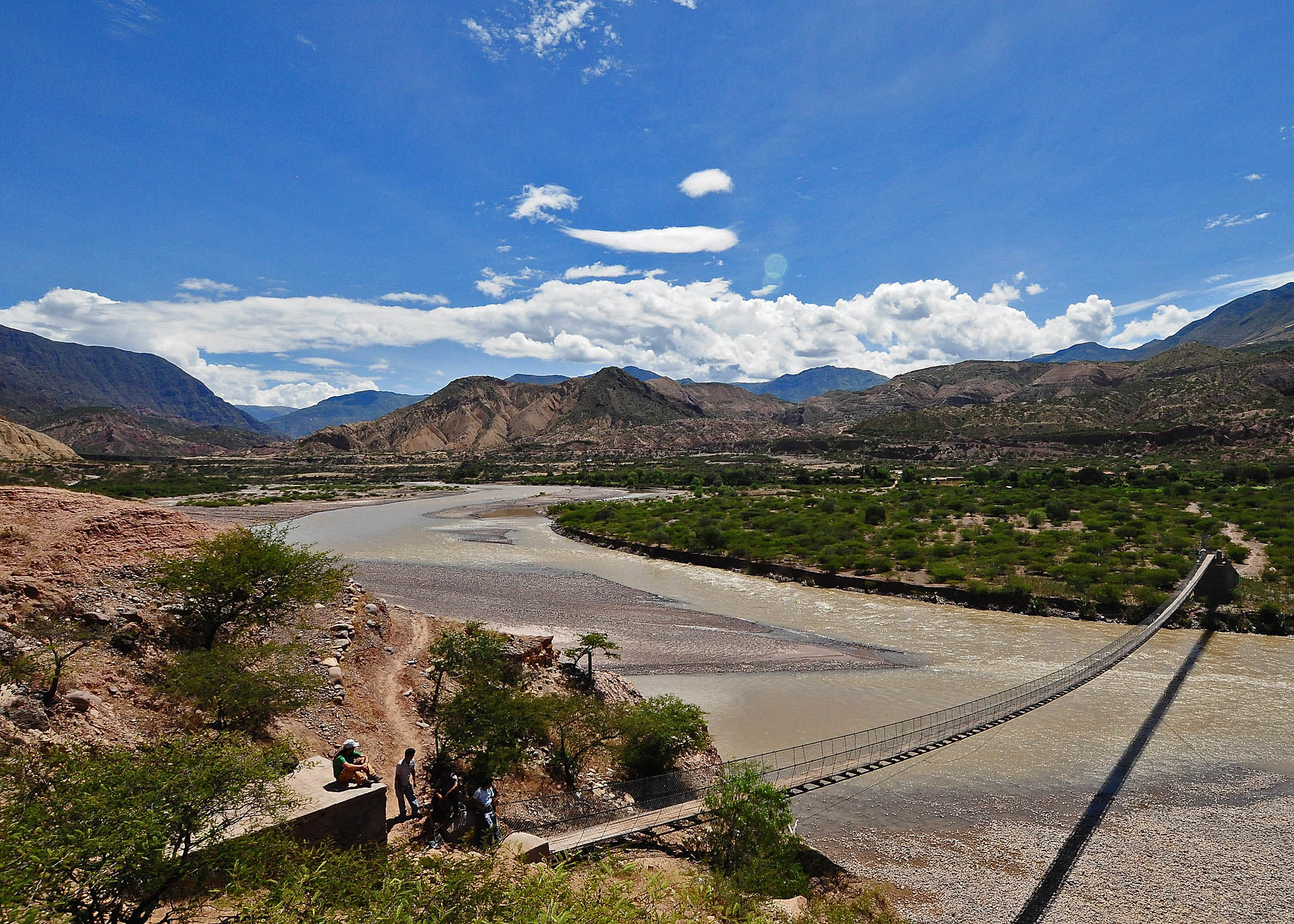
- Footbridge across Mantaro River in Chaypara, La Merced District
- Interactive map of La Merced District
- Country: Peru
- Region: Huancavelica
- Province: Churcampa
- Founded: November 30, 1945
- Capital: La Merced

Government
  - Mayor: Irineo Guevara Pacheco

Area
  - Total: 69 km^{2} (27 sq mi)
- Elevation: 2,632 m (8,635 ft)

Population (2005 census)
  - Total: 587
  - Density: 8.5/km^{2} (22/sq mi)
- Time zone: UTC-5 (PET)
- UBIGEO: 090505

La Merced District is one of ten districts of the province Churcampa in Peru.

== Ethnic groups ==
The people in the district are mainly Indigenous citizens of Quechua descent. Quechua is the language which the majority of the population (53.28%) learnt to speak in childhood, 46.62% of the residents started speaking using the Spanish language (2007 Peru Census).
