= Tayacaja province =

Coordinates: 12.398156°S 74.867728°W

Tayacaja
- Province
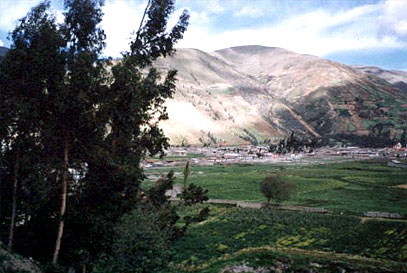
- Pampas

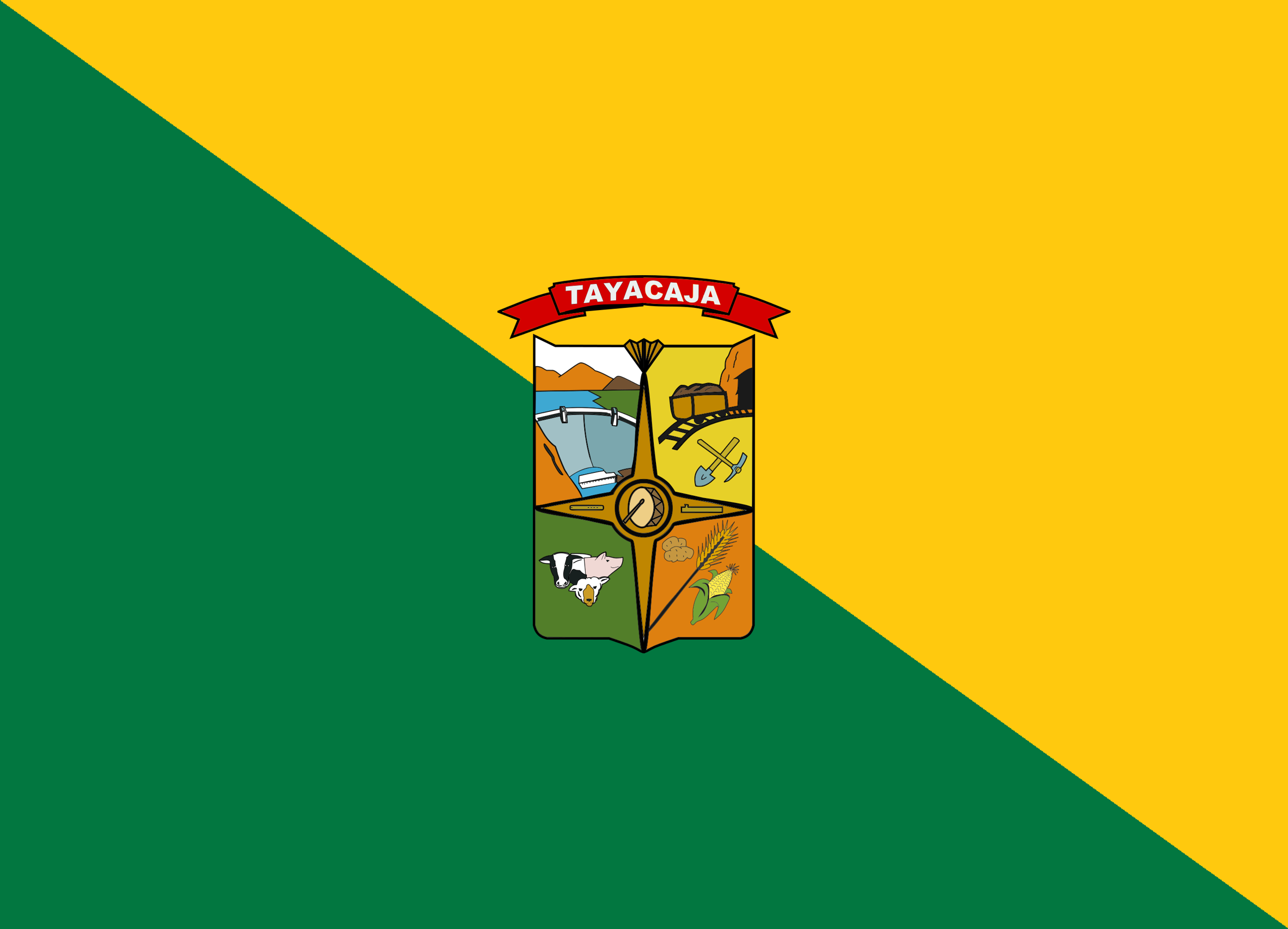
- Flag Coat of arms

- Location of Tayacaja in the Huancavelica Region
- Country: Peru
- Region: Huancavelica
- Capital: Pampas

Government
  - Mayor: Jesus Americo Monge Abad (2007)

Area
  - Total: 3,370.6 km^{2} (1,301.4 sq mi)

Population
  - Total: 104,378
  - Density: 30.967/km^{2} (80.205/sq mi)
- UBIGEO: 0907

Tayacaja is one of seven provinces located in the Huancavelica Region of Peru. The capital of this province is the city of Pampas. The province has a population of 116,371 inhabitants as of 2002.

== Boundaries ==
- North: Junín Region
- East: Ayacucho Region, Churcampa province
- South: Huancavelica province
- West: Junín Region

== Political division ==
Tayacaja is divided into eighteen districts, which are:

- Acostambo (Acostambo)
- Acraquia (Acraquia)
- Ahuaycha (Ahuaycha)
- Colcabamba (Colcabamba)
- Daniel Hernández (Mariscal Cáceres)
- Huachocolpa (Huachocolpa)
- Huaribamba (Huaribamba)
- Ñahuimpuquio (Ñahuimpuquio)
- Pampas (Pampas)
- Pazos (Pazos)
- Quishuar (Quishuar)
- Salcabamba (Salcabamba)
- Salcahuasi (Salcahuasi)
- San Marcos de Rocchac (San Marcos de Rocchac)
- Surcubamba (Surcubamba)
- Tintay Puncu (Tintay)
- Andaymarca (Andaymarca)
- Quichuas (Quichuas)

== Geography ==
One of the highest peaks in the district is Chawpi Urqu at approximately 4,600 m (15,100 ft). Other mountains are listed below:

- Anka Tiyanan
- Artisa
- Atuq Punta
- Aya Wasi
- Chiqlla Pampa
- Chiqllas
- Hatun Asnu
- Hatun Pampa
- Hatun Pata
- Hatun Q'asa
- Hatun Ukru
- Hatun Urqu
- Hatun Wayq'u
- Inka Puyku
- Inka Rumi
- Inkill Pata
- Kiswar Pampa
- Kiswar Q'asa
- Kiswar Tuna
- Kuntur Kuntur
- Kuntur Qaqa
- Kuntur Sinqa
- Luychu Pukyu
- Luychus
- Llaksa
- Llama Kancha
- Llant'an Urqu
- Llaqta Qulluy
- Llaqta Qulluy Pata
- Llawlli Urqu
- Llulluch'a Urqu
- Mata Qucha
- Millpu
- Mishi Qucha
- Muchka Urqu
- Muyu Urqu
- Pata Qucha
- Puka K'ark'a
- Puka Muqu
- Puka Qucha
- Puma Willka
- Putaqa Pata
- Puywan
- Phiruruyuq
- P'unqu Q'asa
- Qalla Qalla
- Qillwaqucha
- Q'asa Q'asa
- Q'illuqucha
- Ranra Qucha
- Rayusqa
- Rumi Wasi
- Saqsa Kunka
- Saywa Urqu
- Silla Q'asa
- Sumaq Pata
- Tiklla Q'asa
- Tuna K'uchu
- T'utura
- Urqun Chupa
- Usnu Pata
- Wamani
- Wamani Marka
- Wanu Pata
- Warawniyuq
- Warmi Qucha
- Wayta
- Wayta Pallana
- Wayta Qucha
- Wiru Munti
- Yana Chaka
- Yana Ichhu
- Yana Qucha
- Yana Saywa
- Yuraq Yaku Urqu

== Ethnic groups ==
The people in the province are mainly Indigenous citizens of Quechua descent. Quechua is the language which the majority of the population (65.11%) learnt to speak in childhood, 34.51% of the residents started speaking using the Spanish language (2007 Peru Census).

== See also ==
- Inka Mach'ay
- Llaqta Qulluy
- Pirwayuq
- Tampu Mach'ay
