= Colcabamba, Tayacaja =

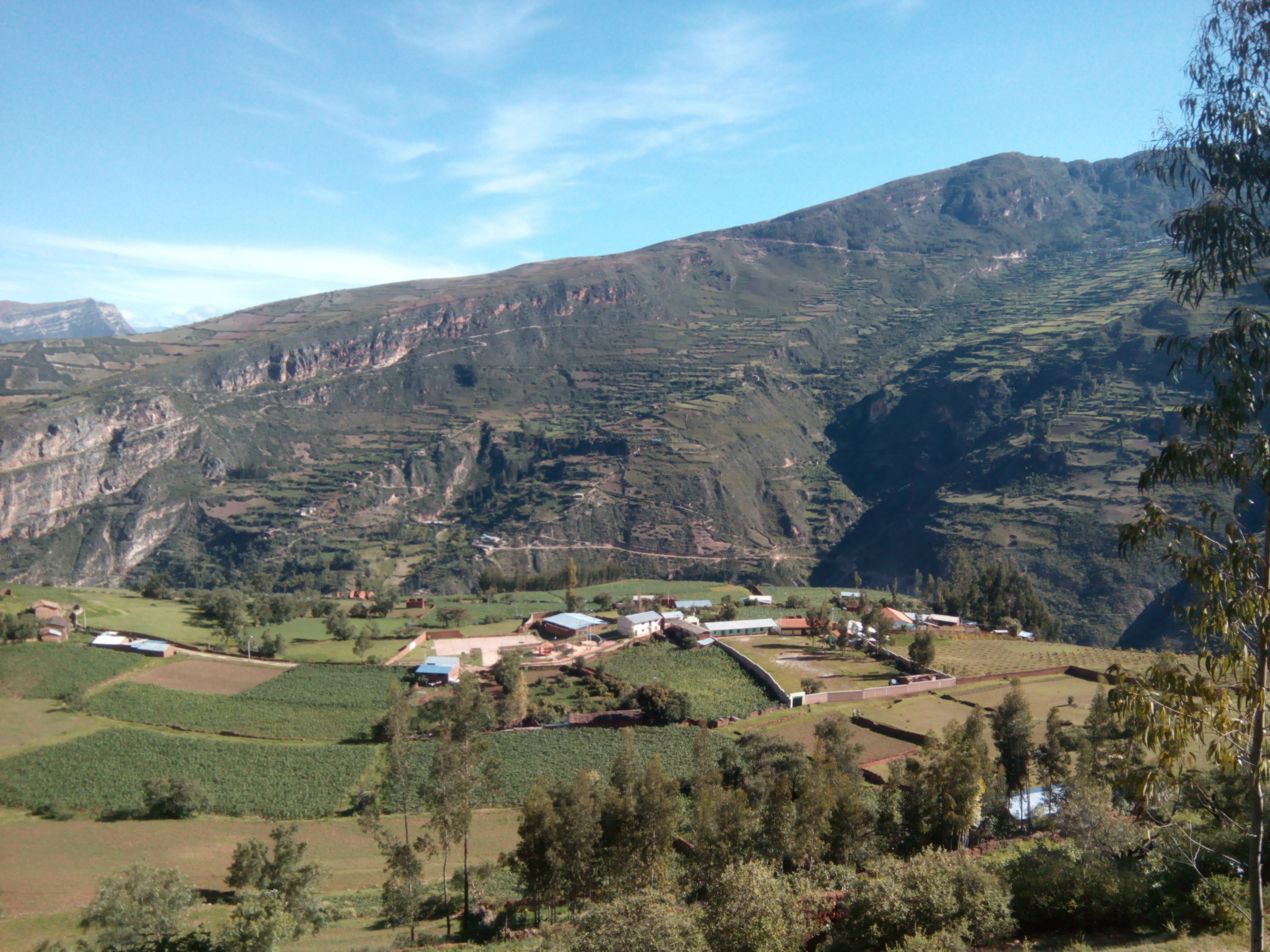
Colcabamba, Colcabamba District, Tayacaja Province, Huancavelica Region, Peru

Colcabamba is the capital of the district of Colcabamba District, Tayacaja Province, Huancavelica Region, Peru. According to the 2007 Peru Census, it has a population of 2,026. In 2015 that increased to 19,37.

== Climate ==
Climate data for Colcabamba, elevation 3,019 m (9,905 ft), (1991–2020)
Month	Jan	Feb	Mar	Apr	May	Jun	Jul	Aug	Sep	Oct	Nov	Dec	Year
Mean daily maximum °C (°F)	18.1 (64.6)	17.6 (63.7)	17.7 (63.9)	18.4 (65.1)	19.0 (66.2)	18.8 (65.8)	18.6 (65.5)	19.5 (67.1)	19.4 (66.9)	19.8 (67.6)	20.3 (68.5)	18.2 (64.8)	18.8 (65.8)
Mean daily minimum °C (°F)	9.2 (48.6)	9.4 (48.9)	9.3 (48.7)	8.6 (47.5)	7.8 (46.0)	7.0 (44.6)	6.3 (43.3)	7.0 (44.6)	8.2 (46.8)	8.7 (47.7)	9.3 (48.7)	9.3 (48.7)	8.3 (47.0)
Average precipitation mm (inches)	174.7 (6.88)	170.5 (6.71)	152.5 (6.00)	57.4 (2.26)	22.7 (0.89)	14.6 (0.57)	13.4 (0.53)	16.4 (0.65)	34.6 (1.36)	72.0 (2.83)	65.5 (2.58)	125.4 (4.94)	919.7 (36.2)
Source: National Meteorology and Hydrology Service of Peru
