= Surcubamba District =

Coordinates: 12.1163°S 74.6302°W

Surcubamba
- District
- Interactive map of Surcubamba
- Country: Peru
- Region: Huancavelica
- Province: Tayacaja
- Capital: Surcubamba

Government
  - Mayor: Nelfa Comun Gavilan

Area
  - Total: 230.88 km^{2} (89.14 sq mi)
- Elevation: 2,585 m (8,481 ft)

Population (2005 census)
  - Total: 5,098
  - Density: 22.08/km^{2} (57.19/sq mi)
- Time zone: UTC-5 (PET)
- UBIGEO: 090717

Surcubamba District is one of sixteen districts of the Tayacaja Province in Peru.

== Geography ==
One of the highest peaks of the district is Kulikuli at approximately 4,600 m (15,100 ft). Other mountains are listed below:

- Artisa
- Ch'aki Qucha
- Ch'uru Q'asa
- Hatun Q'asa
- Ichhu Pata
- Inkill Pata
- Kiska Pata
- Kuntur Sinqa
- Llaqta Qulluy
- Llaqta Qulluy Pata
- Mata Rumi
- Muchka Urqu
- Pirwayuq
- Qunchayuq

The largest lake of the district is Warmi Qucha ("woman's lake").

== Ethnic groups ==
The people in the district are mainly Indigenous citizens of Quechua descent. Quechua is the language which the majority of the population (89.61%) learnt to speak in childhood, 9.99% of the residents started speaking using the Spanish language (2007 Peru Census).
