= National United Resurgence =

Political party in Peru

National United Renaissance Renacimiento Unido Nacional
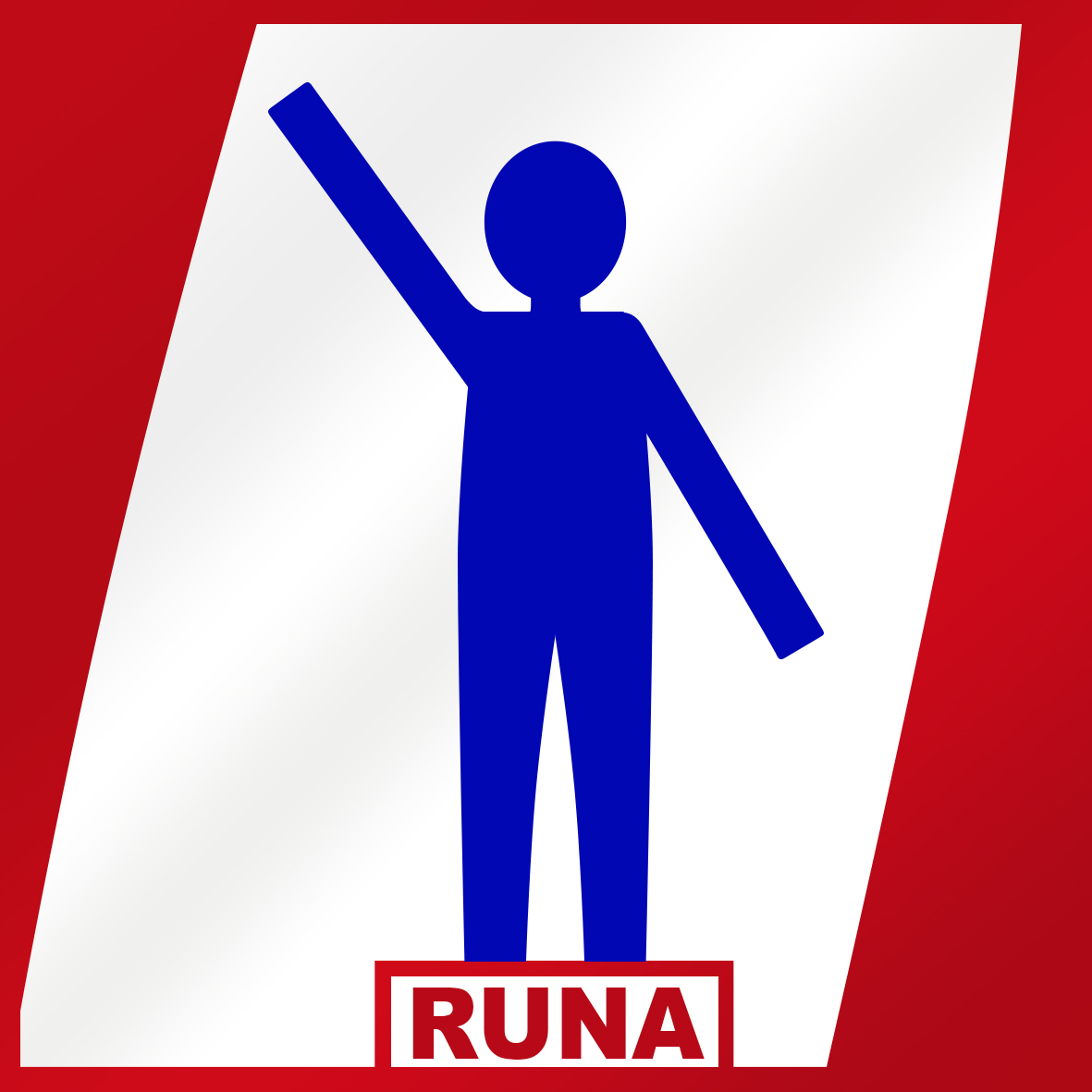
- Abbreviation: RUNA
- President: Ciro Gálvez
- Secretary-General: Ciro Gálvez
- Founded: 1992 (as an organization; Andean Renaissance); 19 August 2002 (as a political party); 15 June 2013 (as National United Renaissance)
- Headquarters: Lima, Peru
- Ideology: Indigenismo
- Political position: Centre
- Seats in the Congress: 0 / 130
- Governorships: 0 / 25
- Regional Councillors: 3 / 274
- Province Mayorships: 0 / 196
- District Mayorships: 0 / 1,874

Website
- partidoruna.com

National United Renaissance (Spanish: Renacimiento Unido Nacional, RUNA) is a political party in Peru.

== History ==
Originally founded as Andean Renaissance (Spanish: Renacimiento Andino, RA) in 1992 as a political organisation, it officially registered as a party on 19 August 2002, and changed to its current name on 15 June 2013.

In 1993, Ciro Gálvez founded the Renacimiento Andino political party. He unsuccessfully ran for president in Peru's 2001 general elections, finishing sixth, and he ran as the presidential candidate of Renacimiento Andino for the general elections of Peru in 2006. On April 7, 2006, two days before the elections, he unofficially withdrew from the race, expressing his support for the candidacy of Lourdes Flores. However, he did not present a formal resignation. It not affect the vote. He received 0.186% of the votes, remaining in position 15 of the electoral contest. Subsequently, the party lost its registration the following year.

On October 28, 2020, Gálvez registered his candidacy for the 2021 general elections in Peru. He commented that "They will face the 2021 elections with their own militants, without an electoral or political alliance, or with well-known figures."

== Election results ==
=== Presidential elections ===
Year	Candidate	Party	Votes	Percentage	Outcome
2001	Ciro Gálvez	Andean Renaissance	85 436	0.81	6th
2006	Ciro Gálvez	Andean Renaissance	22 892	0.19	15th
2021	Ciro Gálvez	National United Renaissance	87,810	0.62	15th

== See also ==
- Category:National United Renaissance politicians
