= Pampas, Peru =

Pampas
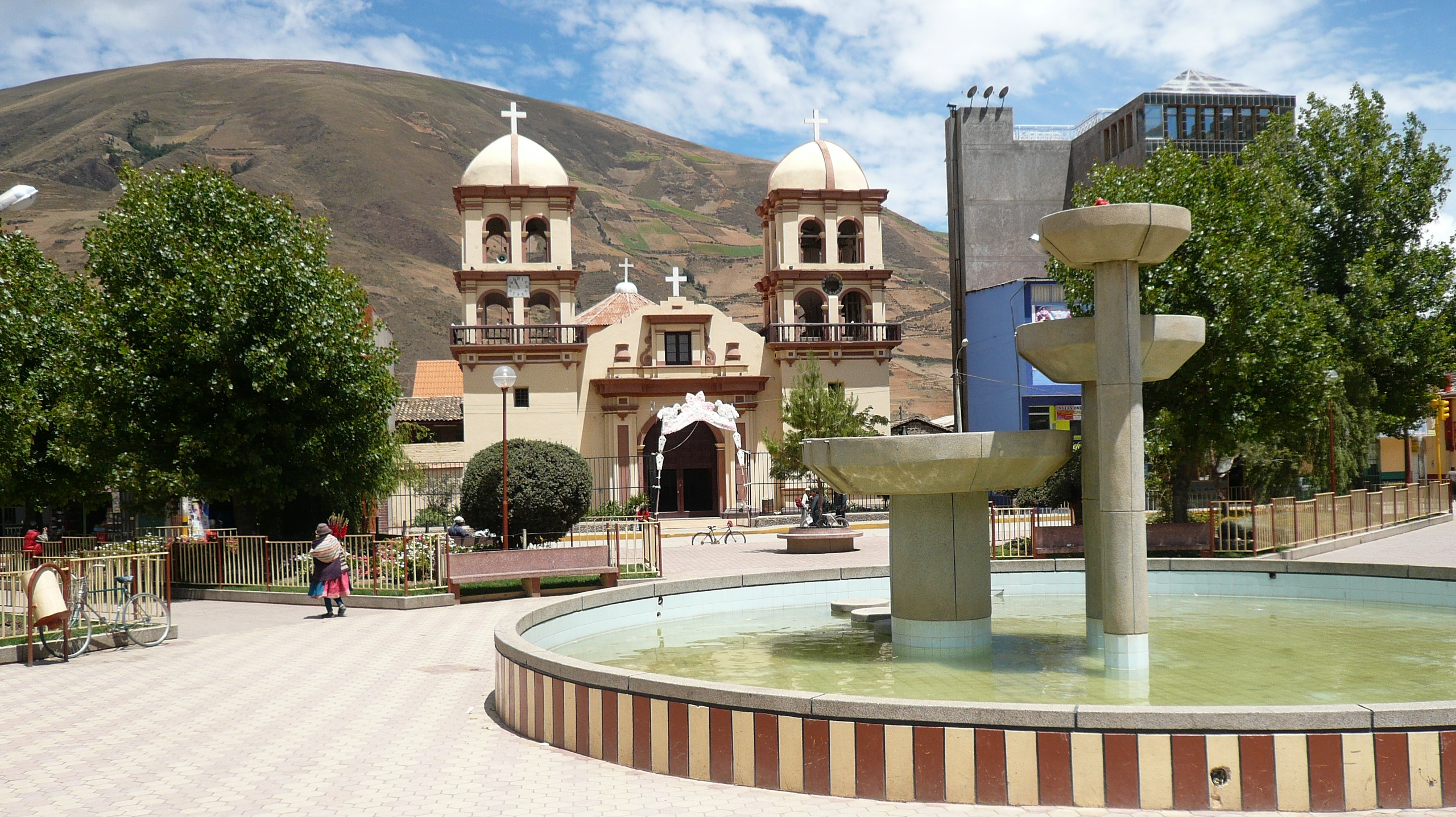
- Plaza de Armas, Pampas

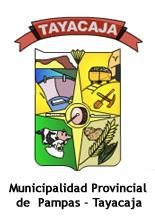
- Flag Coat of arms
- Nickname: Ciudad de los Cuchimichis (The Cuchimichis City)
- Location within Peru
- Coordinates: 12°23′55.76″S 74°52′12.78″W
- Country: Peru
- Region: Huancavelica
- Province: Tayacaja
- Established: 21 June 1825

Government
  - Mayor: Jess Amrico Monge Abad

Area
  - Total: 52.264 km^{2} (20.179 sq mi)
- Elevation: 3,276 m (10,748 ft)

Population
  - Total: 11,566
  - Density: 221.3/km^{2} (573/sq mi)
- Time zone: UTC-5 (PET)
  - Summer (DST): UTC-5 (PET)
- Postal code: 090701
- Area code: 067
- Website: www.munitayacaja.gob.pe

Pampas is a city in Peru. It is the capital of the Tayacaja Province and it was established on June 21, 1825. According to the 2007 census had a population of 9,973 (11,566 in the metropolitan area). It has an approximate altitude of 3,276 metres.

== Transportation ==
The city is connected to the nearby cities like Huancayo and Ayacucho by partially paved roads.

== Education ==
The city house a branch of the Universidad Nacional de Huancavelica and it is home of a local technical institute; the Instituto Tecnologico Pampas - Tayacaja.

== Health ==
The city has now a new hospital, the Hospital Pampas that serve the city and the towns nearby.

== Images ==
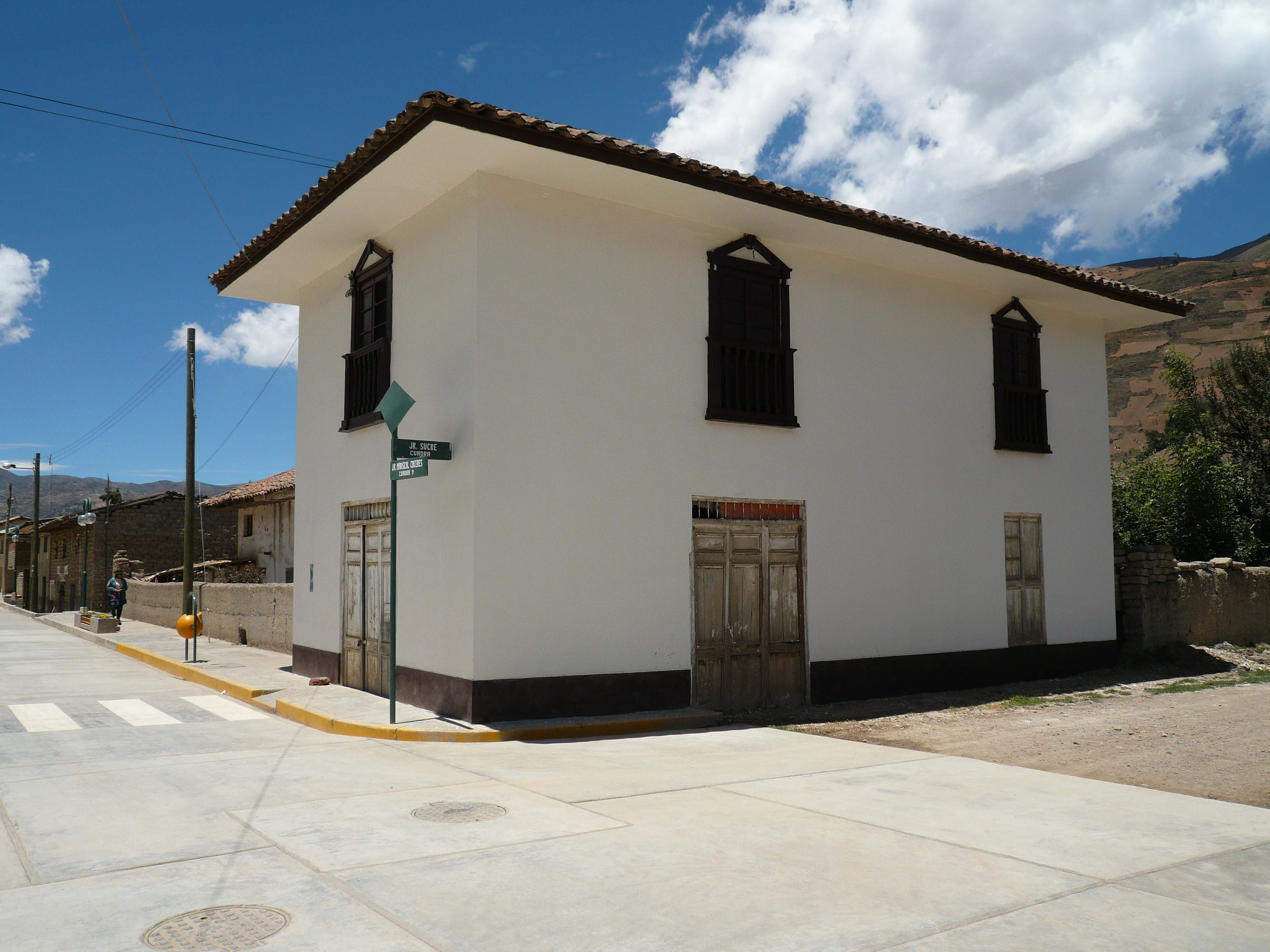
A house in Pampas.

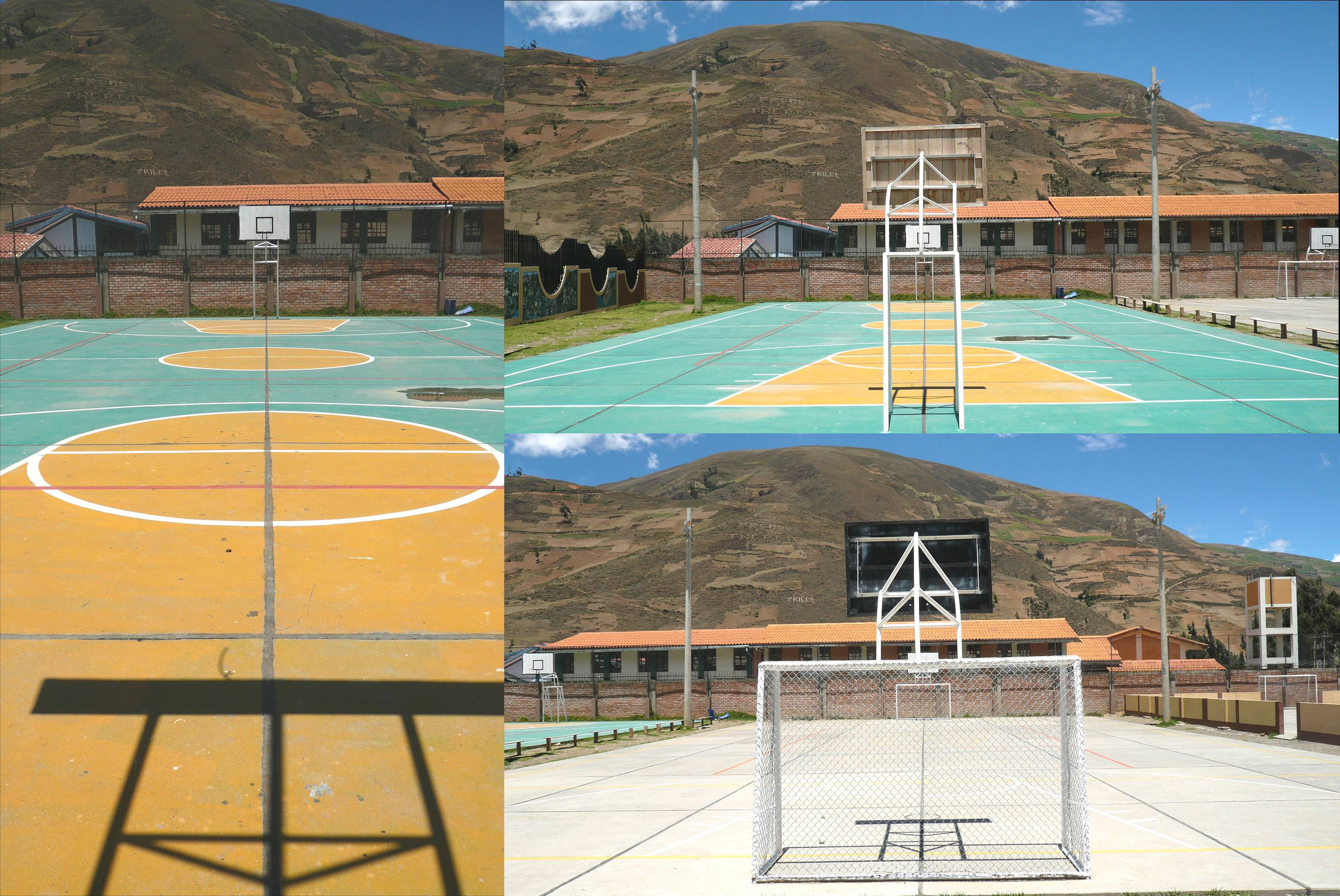
Futsal court in Pampas.

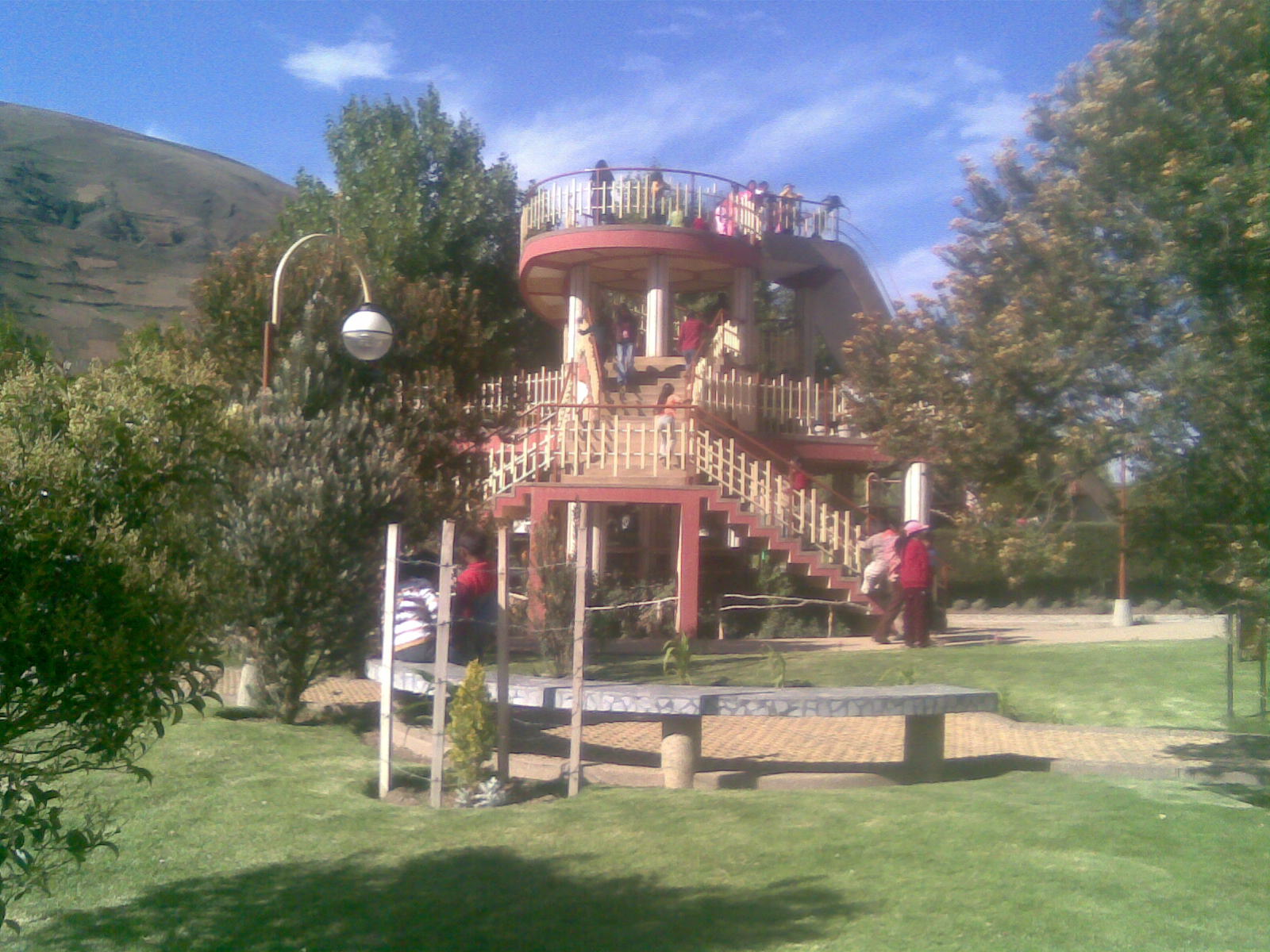
Slide in the "Parque Ecolgico de Pampas".

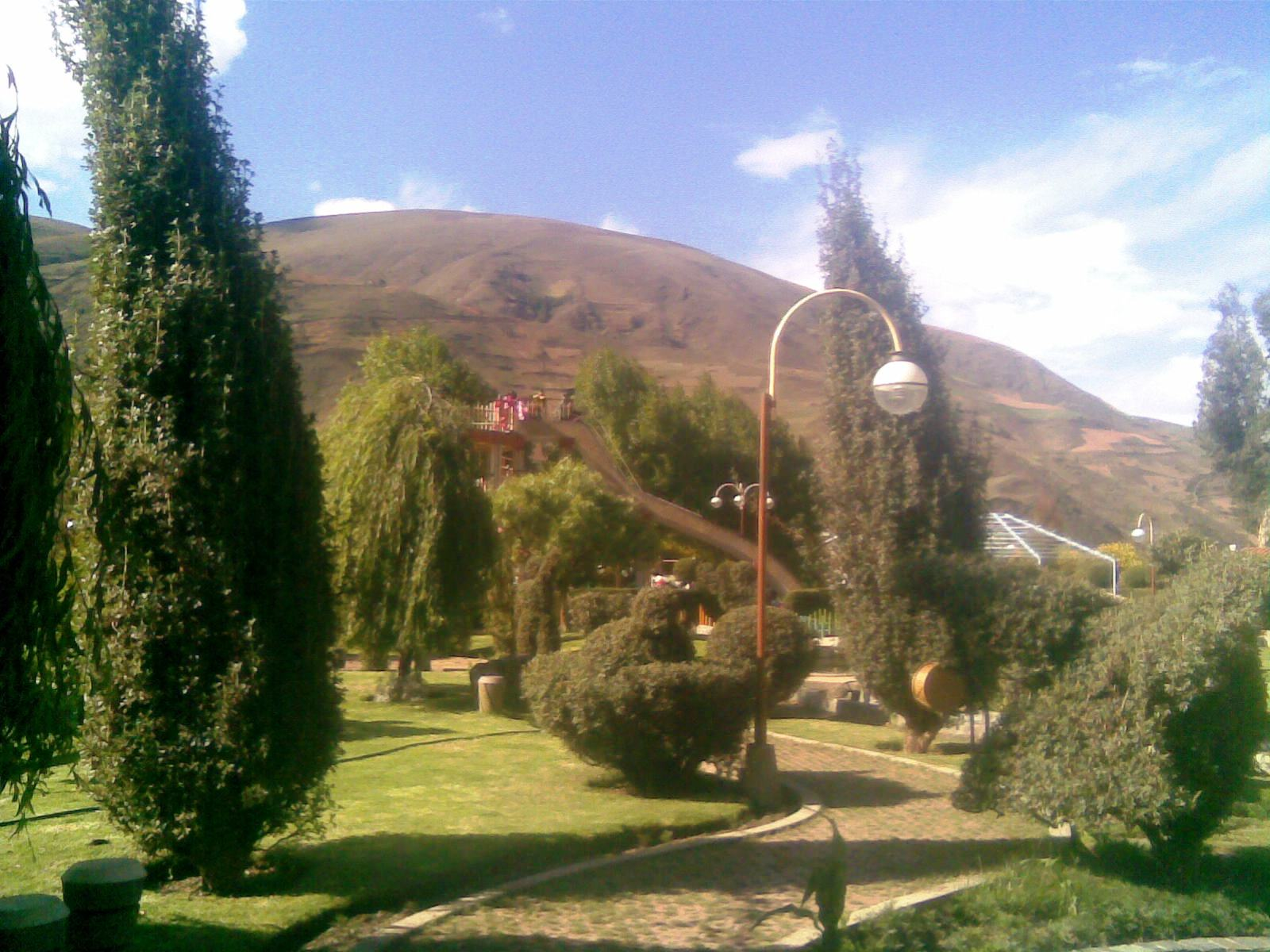
Gardens in the "Parque Ecolgico de Pampas".

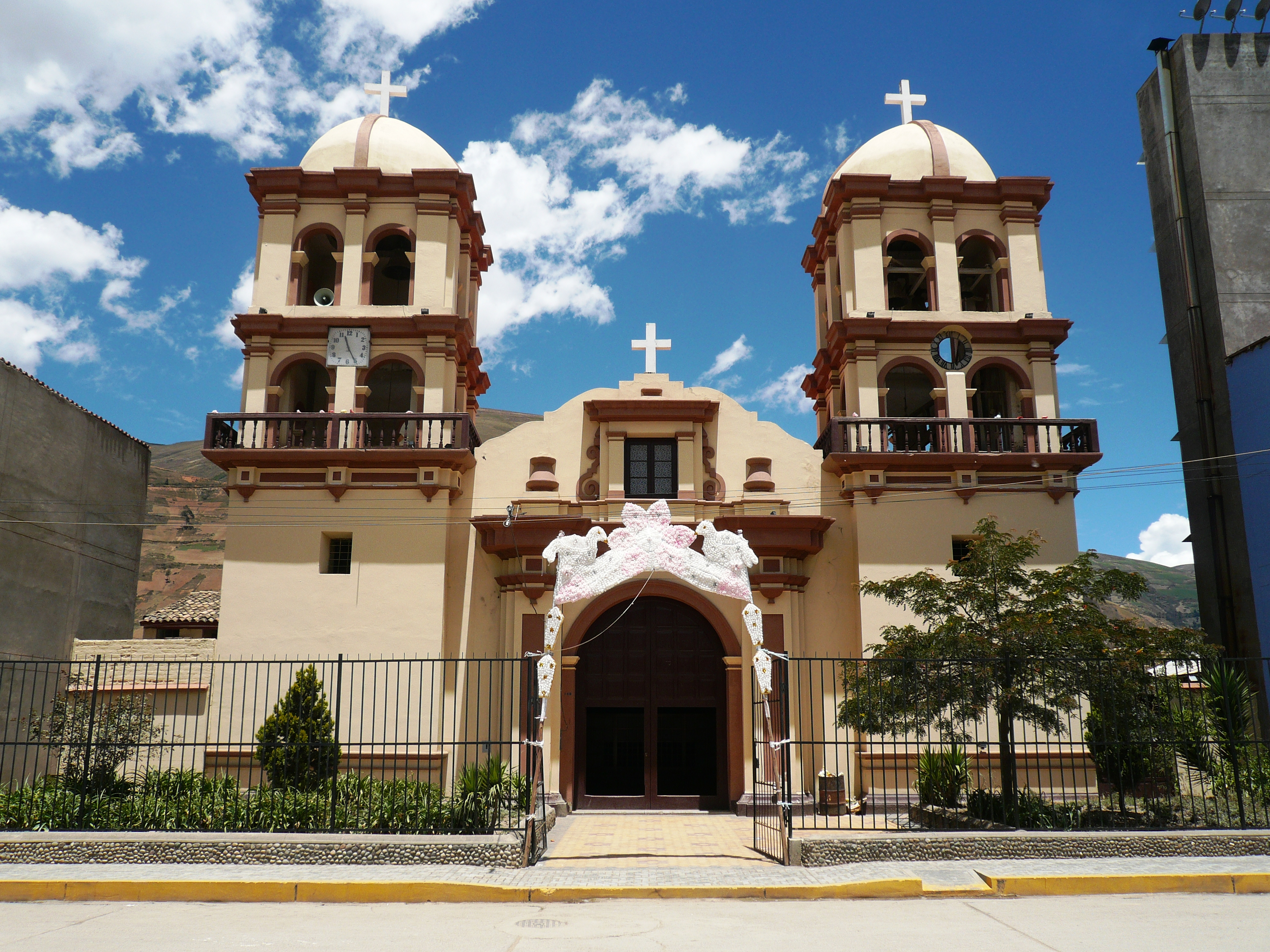
Cathedral of San Pedro de Pampas.

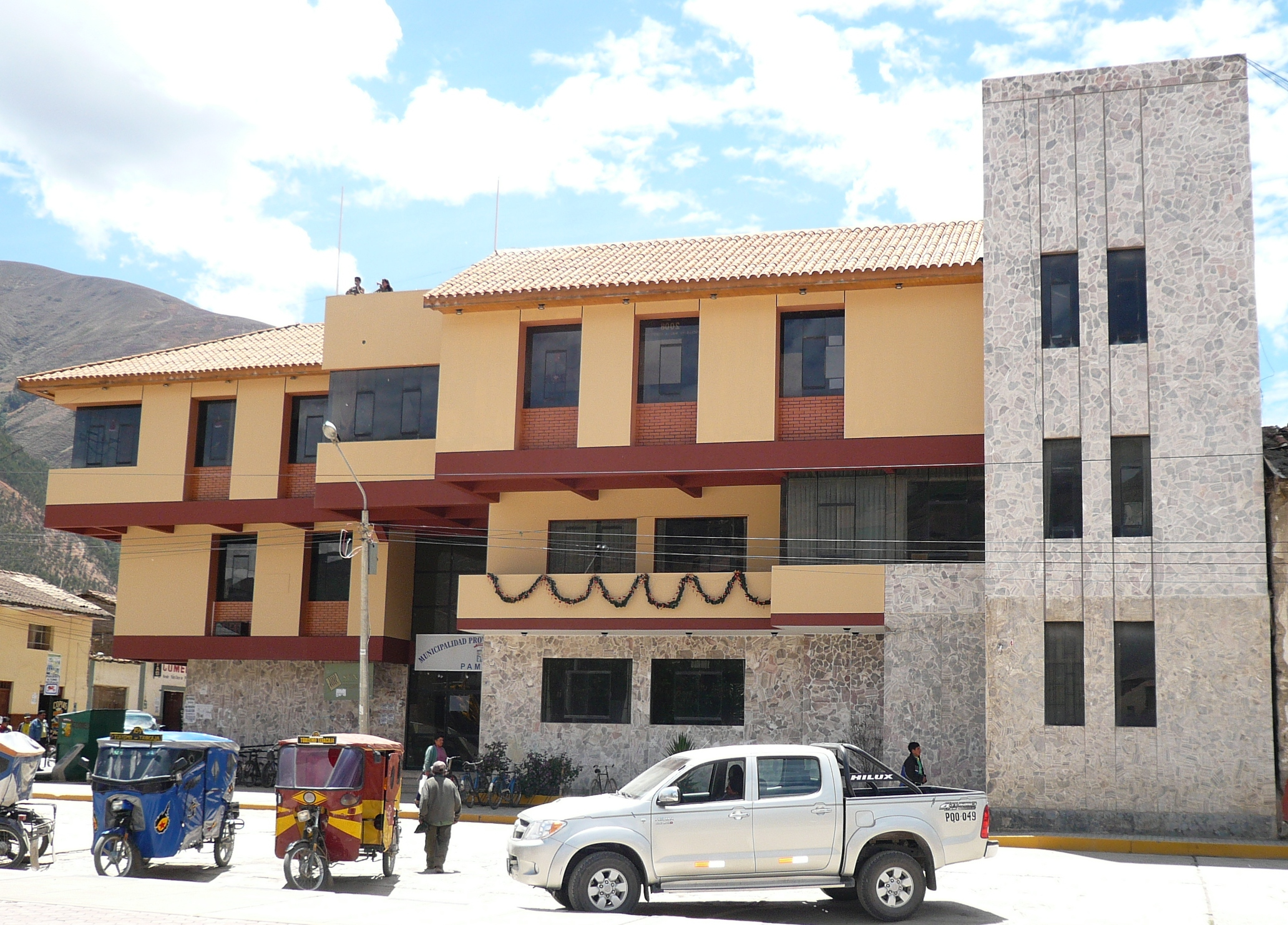
Municipality of Pampas.

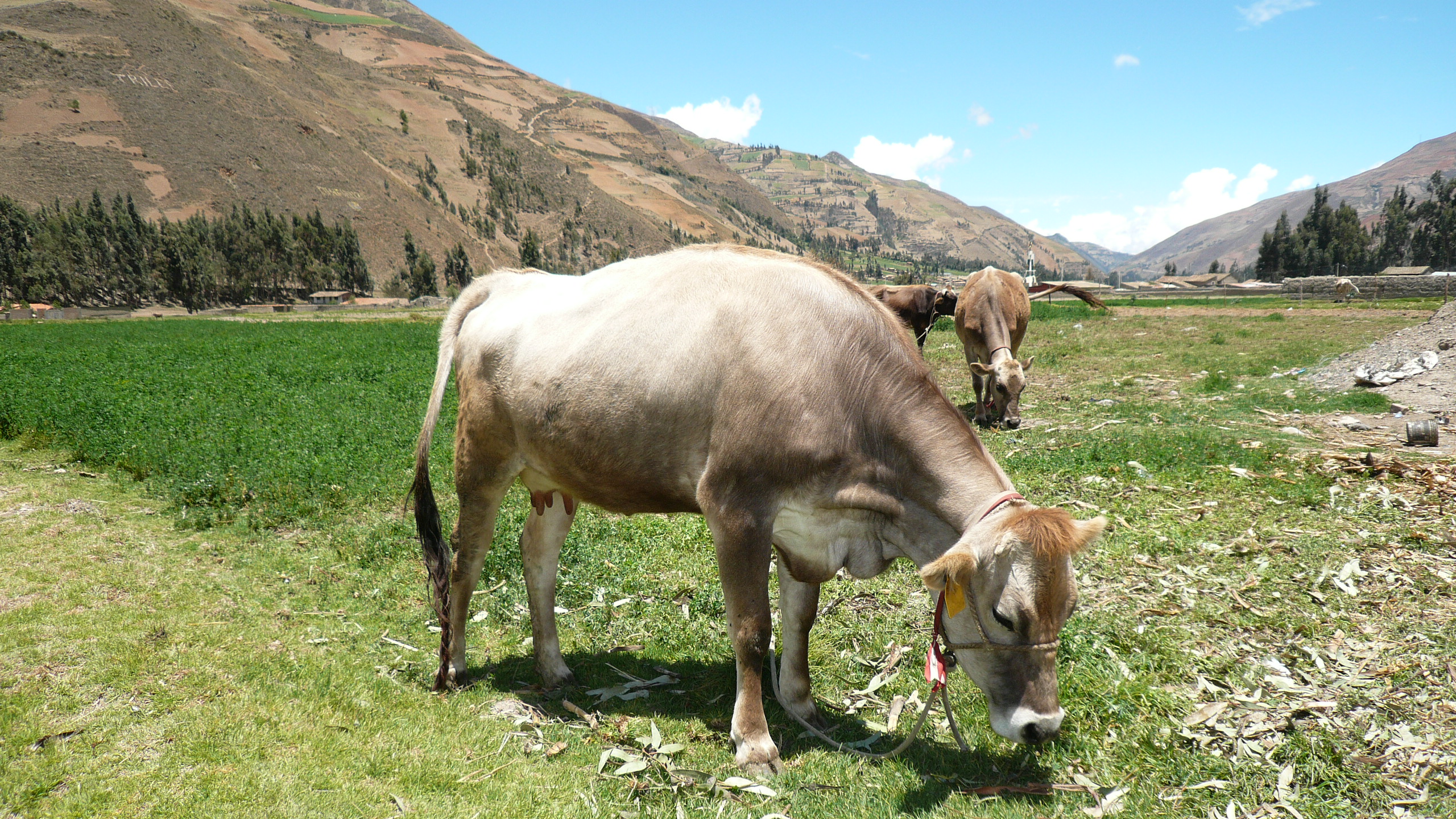
A cow in Pampas.

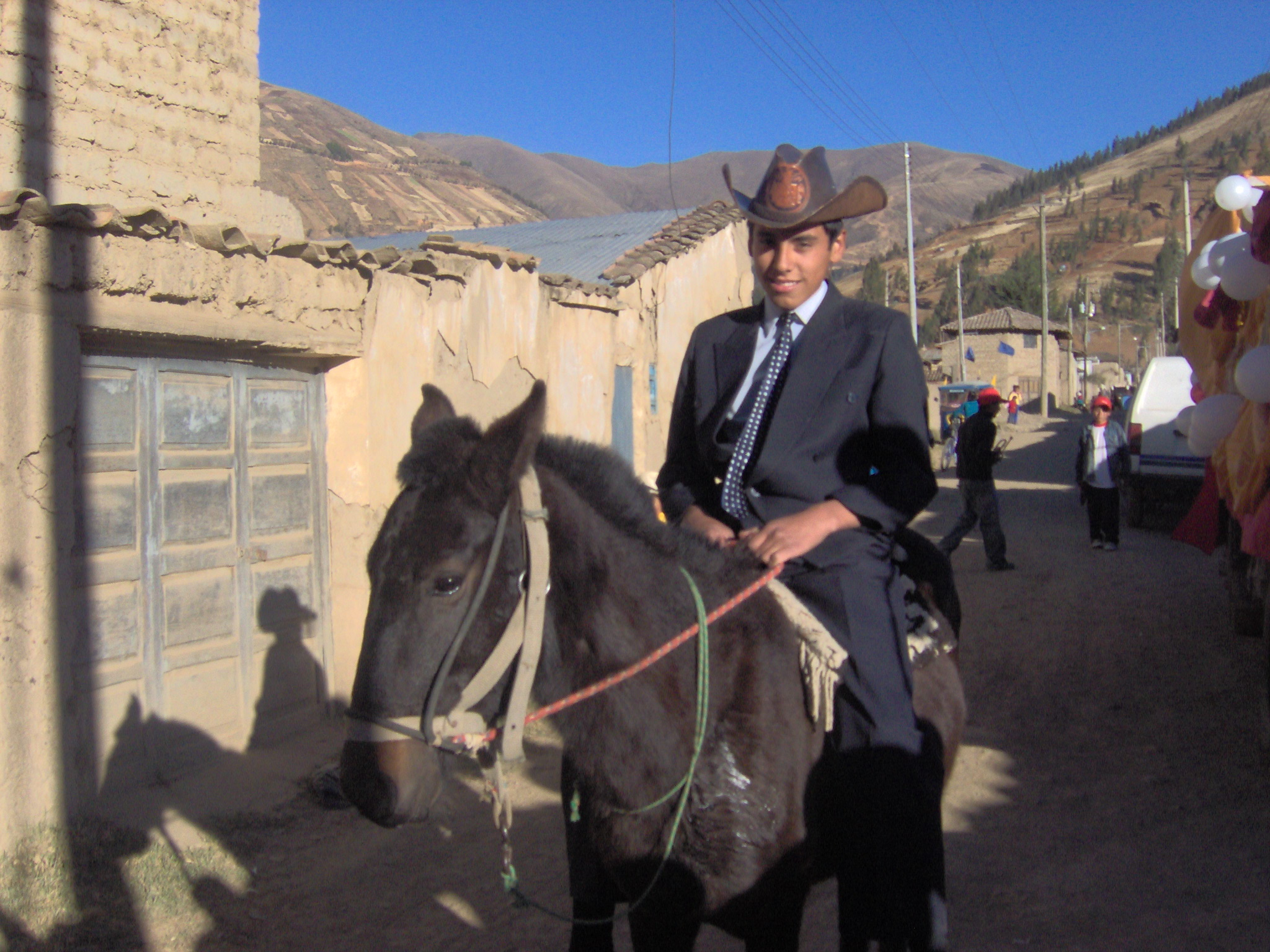
Pampino.
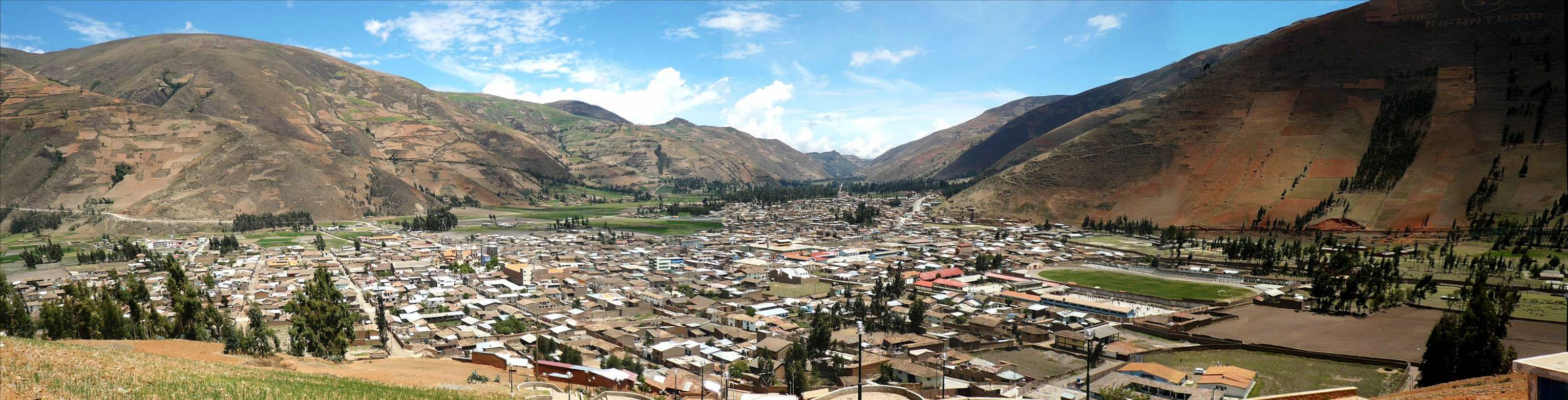
Panoramic of Pampas
