= Colcabamba District, Tayacaja =

Colcabamba Qullqa Pampa
- District
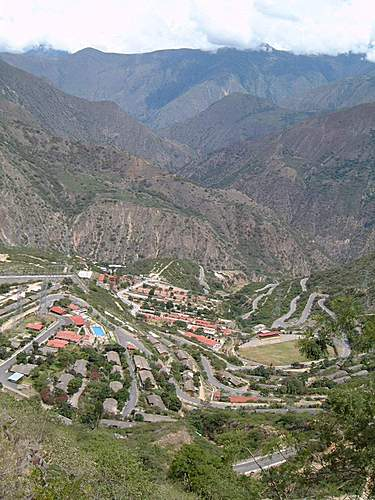
- Campo Armiño, Colcabamba District

- Coat of arms

- Location of Colcabamba in the Tayacaja province
- Coordinates: 12°24.5′S 74°40.6′W
- Country: Peru
- Region: Huancavelica
- Province: Tayacaja
- Capital: Colcabamba

Government
  - Mayor: Augusto Maravi Romani

Area
  - Total: 598.12 km^{2} (230.94 sq mi)
- Elevation: 2,979 m (9,774 ft)

Population (2005 census)
  - Total: 21,593
  - Density: 36.101/km^{2} (93.502/sq mi)
- Time zone: UTC-5 (PET)
- UBIGEO: 090705

Colcabamba (from Quechua: Qullqa Pampa, meaning "deposit plain") is one of sixteen districts of the Tayacaja Province in Peru.

== Geography ==
One of the highest peaks of the district is Atuq Punta at approximately 4,400 m (14,400 ft). Other mountains are listed below:

- Arpayuq
- Ch'uñuna Mach'ay
- Kimsa Chumpi
- Minas Qucha
- Pakay Raqra
- Panti
- Parya Qaqa
- Pawkaray
- Qillwa Qucha
- Q'illu Qucha
- Tayanku
- Wanu Pata
- Waylla
- Wiska

== Ethnic groups ==
The people in the district are mainly Indigenous citizens of Quechua descent. Quechua is the language which the majority of the population (76.32%) learnt to speak in childhood, 23.21% of the residents started speaking using the Spanish language (2007 Peru Census).

== Climate ==
Climate data for Colcabamba, elevation 3,019 m (9,905 ft), (1991–2020)
Month	Jan	Feb	Mar	Apr	May	Jun	Jul	Aug	Sep	Oct	Nov	Dec	Year
Mean daily maximum °C (°F)	18.1 (64.6)	17.6 (63.7)	17.7 (63.9)	18.4 (65.1)	19.0 (66.2)	18.8 (65.8)	18.6 (65.5)	19.5 (67.1)	19.4 (66.9)	19.8 (67.6)	20.3 (68.5)	18.2 (64.8)	18.8 (65.8)
Mean daily minimum °C (°F)	9.2 (48.6)	9.4 (48.9)	9.3 (48.7)	8.6 (47.5)	7.8 (46.0)	7.0 (44.6)	6.3 (43.3)	7.0 (44.6)	8.2 (46.8)	8.7 (47.7)	9.3 (48.7)	9.3 (48.7)	8.3 (47.0)
Average precipitation mm (inches)	174.7 (6.88)	170.5 (6.71)	152.5 (6.00)	57.4 (2.26)	22.7 (0.89)	14.6 (0.57)	13.4 (0.53)	16.4 (0.65)	34.6 (1.36)	72.0 (2.83)	65.5 (2.58)	125.4 (4.94)	919.7 (36.2)
Source: National Meteorology and Hydrology Service of Peru
