= Recuay, Peru =

Recuay
- Town
- Location within Peru
- Coordinates: 9°43′19.74″S 77°27′22.58″W
- Country: Peru
- Region: Ancash
- Province: Recuay
- District: Recuay

Government
  - Mayor: Milton Duck Leon Vergara
- Elevation: 3,422 m (11,227 ft)
- Time zone: UTC-5 (PET)

Recuay is a town in the Ancash Region, Peru. It is located at the border of the Santa River, 3422 msnm, and it the capital of the Recuay Province. it was created by law 11326 on April 14, 1950.

Recuay maintains its colonial style up to now, with its old casonas and simple buildings, made of mud walls and tiles roofs. Its main square has a classic fountain in the middle, surrounded with grills. From there the majestic 'hill of Jerusalem' is observed and the eucalyptuses and cypresses that adorn this city can also be admired.

It possesses the mineral waters and thermal springs of Quñuqqucha, Uqhuschaka, Pachaqutu, Pumapampa, Burgos and Utuco. The lakes named Qiruqucha and Quñuqqucha are located inside the limits of the province, as well as the magnificent Puya Raimondi forest - taking the detour towards Carpa - and the San Francisco cave, a geologic formation of volcanic rock with beautiful stalactites.

There is also another unpaved highway that joins Recuay with Aija, the homeland of the scientist Santiago Antúnez de Mayolo. It is necessary to climb the Cordillera Negra which crosses Wank'ap'iti at 4,000 msnm, and descend towards the city of Aija.

At 25 km from Recuay, penetrating the Callejón de Huaylas, Huaraz, the capital of the Ancash Region, is located. On both sides of the paved highway towards Huaraz, a big variety of typical sceneries are repeated tirelessly. From Puente Bedoya (Bedoya bridge) (km 183) starts, on the right hand, a road towards Olleros and Waripampa (Huaripampa), and the more and more journeyed walk towards Chavín.

== Geography ==
=== Climate ===
Climate data for Recuay, elevation 3,431 m (11,257 ft), (1991–2020)
Month	Jan	Feb	Mar	Apr	May	Jun	Jul	Aug	Sep	Oct	Nov	Dec	Year
Mean daily maximum °C (°F)	20.4 (68.7)	20.1 (68.2)	19.7 (67.5)	20.5 (68.9)	21.2 (70.2)	21.6 (70.9)	21.9 (71.4)	22.3 (72.1)	22.1 (71.8)	21.3 (70.3)	21.0 (69.8)	20.6 (69.1)	21.1 (69.9)
Mean daily minimum °C (°F)	6.1 (43.0)	6.4 (43.5)	6.4 (43.5)	5.8 (42.4)	4.0 (39.2)	1.8 (35.2)	0.8 (33.4)	1.3 (34.3)	3.3 (37.9)	4.8 (40.6)	5.1 (41.2)	5.8 (42.4)	4.3 (39.7)
Average precipitation mm (inches)	116.6 (4.59)	127.5 (5.02)	173.5 (6.83)	95.1 (3.74)	30.9 (1.22)	6.4 (0.25)	2.1 (0.08)	5.6 (0.22)	28.9 (1.14)	67.1 (2.64)	71.4 (2.81)	111.4 (4.39)	836.5 (32.93)
Source: National Meteorology and Hydrology Service of Peru
