= Aija =

Aija may refer to:

- Aija (given name), Latvian feminine given name
- Aija Province, province in the Ancash Region of Peru
- Aija District, district in the Ancash Region of Peru
- Aija, Peru, town in the Ancash Region of Peru
- Aijā, 2023 song by Sudden Lights set to represent Latvia in the Eurovision Song Contest 2023
