= Aija District =

Coordinates: 9°46′01″S 77°37′59″W

Aija
- District
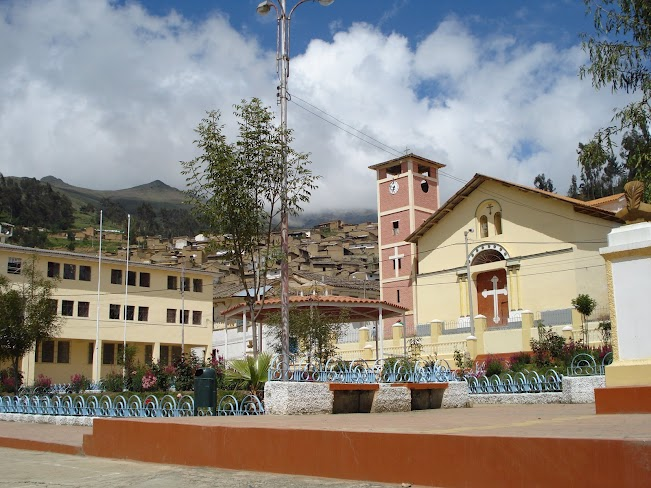
- Interactive map of Aija
- Country: Peru
- Region: Ancash
- Province: Aija
- Capital: Aija

Government
  - Mayor: German Ignacio Hizo Requena (2007)

Area
  - Total: 159.74 km^{2} (61.68 sq mi)
- Elevation: 3,363 m (11,033 ft)

Population (2017)
  - Total: 2,017
  - Density: 12.63/km^{2} (32.70/sq mi)
- Time zone: UTC-5 (PET)
- UBIGEO: 020201

Aija District is one of 5 districts in Aija Province, Ancash Region, Peru. Its population was 2017 as of the 2017 census.

== Geography ==
The District of Aija is located on the western slopes of the Cordillera Negra. It borders on Recuay Province to the south and east, on Coris District, Huacllan District and Succha District to the west, and on La Merced District to the north.

Some of the highest mountains of the district are listed below:

- Kuntur Pukyu
- Lima Hirka
- Parya
- Puka Allpa
- Puka Hirka
- Puma Puñunan
- Puma Wayin
- Sach'a Hirka
- Wank'ap'iti
- Yana Kunkush
- Yana Mach'ay
- Yuraq Yaku
