= Recuay =

Recuay may refer to:

- Recuay, Peru, a small town in the Río Santa valley in northwestern central Peru
- Recuay Province, a province in the Ancash Region in northwestern central Peru
- Recuay District, a district in the Recuay Province in the Ancash Region
- Recuay culture, a pre-Columbian culture in northwestern central Peru
