= José Anaya =

Peruvian politician

Member of Congress
- In office 26 July 2006 – 26 July 2011
- Constituency: Ancash

Personal details
- Born: José Oriol Anaya Oropeza; 23 March 1948 (age 76); Coris, Aija, Peru
- Political party: Union for Peru
- Occupation: Politician

José Oriol Anaya Oropeza (born 23 March 1948 in Coris) is a Peruvian politician. He was a former Congressman representing Ancash for the 2006–2011 period, and belongs to the Union for Peru party.
