= Pamparomas (disambiguation) =

Pamparomas may refer to a village and a district in Peru:

- Pamparomas, a village in the Pamparomas District
- Pamparomas District, a district in the Huaylas Province in the Ancash Region of Peru
