= Callejón de Huaylas =

Valley in Peru

Coordinates: 9°16′S 77°07′W

Camino Laguna Parón

The Santa Valley (Quechua Sancta) is an inter-andean valley in the Ancash Region in the north-central highlands of Peru. Due to its location between two mountain ranges, it is known as Callejón de Huaylas, the Alley of Huaylas, whereas "Huaylas" refers to the territorial division's name during the Viceroyalty of Peru.

Going north from Lima, the road climbs to an altitude of 3,945 m, where the lake Conococha marks the head of the valley. This lake is the main source of Santa River. From here the road descends into the Callejón de Huaylas, demarcated by the Cordillera Blanca ("white range") to the east and the Cordillera Negra ("black range") to the west. To the south rise the summits of the Huayhuash mountain range.

Huaraz, the capital of Ancash, is the largest city in the Callejón, located at 3,000 m above sea level. In the valley north of Huaraz there are the towns Carhuaz, Yungay (the site of a major earthquake and landslide in 1970 that buried the town and killed over 20,000 people) and Caraz which is considered the last city in the valley.

== Location ==
The Callejón de Huaylas stretches for 150 km in the Ancash Region of Peru. The Santa river runs along the valley floor in a north-westerly direction. The valley's southern extreme begins at 4,000 m above sea level, and descends to 2,000 m at its northern end past the city of Caraz where the Santa River leaves the valley. It is bordered by two mountain ranges, the snow-covered Cordillera Blanca (White Mountain Range) to the east, where many climbable peaks boast year-round snow above 5,000 m, and the Cordillera Negra (Black Mountain Range) to the west, reaching over 4,000 m but typically getting no snow as it is exposed to warm coastal winds on its western flank. Nevado Huascarán (6,746 m), the highest peak of Peru, is located in the Cordillera Blanca above the town of Yungay.

== History ==
The Callejón de Huaylas has a rich history going back thousands of years. Relatively little survives from the preceramic period in this region, but modern work by Thomas F. Lynch and his team has suggested a civilization which was integrated with the cultures living on the coastal plain. The Callejón contains, within a short distance, many of the major eco-zones of the Andes, and Lynch suggests that this would have allowed considerable diversity of occupations. Guitarrero cave, on the eastern slopes of the Cordillera Negra, serves as one of the primary preceramic sites for the region. Within, Lynch and his team have documented many preserved plant species, including varieties of domesticated maize and vegetal material from exclusively coastal species. Radiocarbon dating of these organic remains demonstrate that human habitation of the cordillera is at least 10,000 years old, and perhaps even more. Elsewhere, the preceramic site of Quebrada Perrón in the northern Callejón contains evidence of complex stone-working and continuous use for thousands of years as a stone workshop.

While these preceramic civilizations precede it, the development of the Chavin Culture at Chavin de Hunatár is often the first discussed due to the importance of the site. Chavin de Hunatár is a ruined ceremonial complex located on a pass between the Conchucos Valley and the Callejón de Huaylas itself. Its relatively low elevation lends it access to the many nearby biomes, from the tropical forest to the mountain peaks to the coastal region. Chavin de Hunatár developed over several hundred years, from 900 BCE to 200 BCE, before later fading from the record. Its influence extended from the Callejón de Huaylas hundreds of kilometers away, as far as the Jequetepeque and Lambayeque Valleys, as evidenced by Chavin-style pottery and construction being found at these sites. In distant Karwa, there are Chavin-style textiles, demonstrating Chavin’s cultural reach. Chavin also served as a religious and pilgrimage center, and we see distant cultures, such as Pacopampa and Kuntur Wasi, changing their temple architecture and craftsmanship to reflect the new Chavin cult. Chavin art includes designs such as jaguars, caimans, and other jungle animals, hinting that the Chavin network extended far distant from its home in the Callejón de Huaylas, to the coasts and the jungle beyond.

Beginning around 200 BCE, Chavin de Hunatár faded from its previous preeminence, and soon was abandoned entirely and inhabited principally by squatters. From this point to around 600 CE, known to anthropologists as the Early Intermediate Period, the region surrounding the Callejón de Huaylas descended into what archeologists have described as a ‘dark age.’ Where before, settlements were distributed amongst valleys and along river valleys, now they became concentrated on hilltops and in defensible positions, hinting at a new wave of warfare in the region. The next major culture which rose here was the Recuay culture, which is first attested in the record circa 250 CE. The Recuay settlements follow the trend of defensibility and are positioned in strategic positions to dominate the Santa Valley. Examples of this distinctive style include the sites of Chinchawas, Pashash, Honco Pampa, Huacarpón, and Yayno. The Recuay pottery style represents something entirely novel, distinct from its Chavin predecessors. It is based on the distinctive use of kaolin clay and complicated, red, white and black painting styles. The Recuay culture also had a characteristic underground funerary style.

Eventually, around 600 CE, the Andes began to unify culturally once again into the Middle Horizon. During this age, two large cultures came to dominate: the Wari and the Tiwanaku, in the north and south, respectively. In the Callejón de Huaylas, the Wari became preeminent, and the first evidence of this is in funerary style. As the Recuay-Wari transition began, the record demonstrates a shift from the underground funerary style to surface Chullpa style. After a significant time of mixing, these tombs began to contain pottery in the Wari style. The Marca Jirca site, east of Huaraz, contains a good example of this. Here are found a collection of Wari-style vases within an intentionally buried Chullpa. Elsewhere in the Callejón de Huaylas, at Honco Pampa, is evidence of Wari temples, ceramics, and even road construction along a major avenue into and out of the Santa Valley, which several archeologists have put forth as evidence for the imperial nature of Wari control. By this time, however, it seems clear that the Callejón had lost most of its cultural influence and had been relegated to a province within the Wari horizon. Most evidence points to the fact that the Wari left the region to be predominantly self-governing, however. By the eleventh century CE, the Wari influence had faded from the region, and the whole of premodern Peru descended once again into an Intermediate Period.

The Late Intermediate Period represents a return to small-scale regionalism and a dearth of any major unifying control. Unfortunately, very few burials and artifacts from this period have been studied form the Callejón de Huaylas. One of the best-attested discoveries, of 21 pottery pieces from Coscopunta, does suggest, however, that regional trade was still taking place. The pottery shares strong resemblances to the Casma-style pottery of the coastal valleys of Chao and Huarmey. Both styles contain pitcher necks and decorative lines of circles around their edges. Melissa Vogel has suggested that this is evidence of a broader state which unified the Callejón de Huaylas with the coastal regions, but there is little other evidence for this. However, it is clear that the Coscopunta collection shares much of its design with other, locally derived potteries from around the Callejón de Huaylas and Callejón de Conchucos, suggesting that trade and inter-cultural contact continued on at least a regional basis. For example, George Lau demonstrates a similarity between the Coscopunta pottery and that of nearby Chinchawas and Carhuaz.

From this point onward, the Callejón de Huaylas fades from importance in the archeological record and is not mentioned in discussions of the Late Horizon and the rise of the Incas.

José de San Martín and Simón Bolívar used the valley as a base during the Wars of Independence because of its strategic value.

In 1885, Pedro Pablo Atusparía was the leader of a peasant uprising in the valley.

On 31 May 1970 a landslide caused by the 1970 Ancash earthquake buried the town of Yungay, killing 25,000 persons. Only 92 people survived, most of whom were in the cemetery and stadium at the time of the earthquake. The regional capital, Huaraz, as well as Caraz and Aija were partially destroyed.

Located in the Callejón de Huaylas, Huascarán National Park was designated a World Biosphere Reserve by UNESCO in 1977 to protect the local flora, fauna and archaeological sites.

== Population ==
The population of the Callejón de Huaylas is primarily Quechua and Spanish-speaking Andeans, most of them small-scale and subsistence-farmers living in mountain villages, mixed with Spanish-speaking Mestizos in the small towns and cities along the Santa river. The richer Mestizos dominate politically and economically, but migration, education and tourism have brought changes in the population in recent decades.

Most Quechua families adhere to traditional forms of food, music, and dress, yet still have cell phones and typically raise Guinea Pigs and other farm animals in their farms. Although men have typically adopted modern pants, collared shirts and sweaters, Quechua women continue to wear llikllas and layered colored skirts called polleras in Spanish. Both men and women wear llanq'is, rudimentary sandals in the traditional style, although they are now made from recycled rubber from car tires. One can buy them in any size from the various markets in the region, for around 5 soles a pair.

== Climate change ==
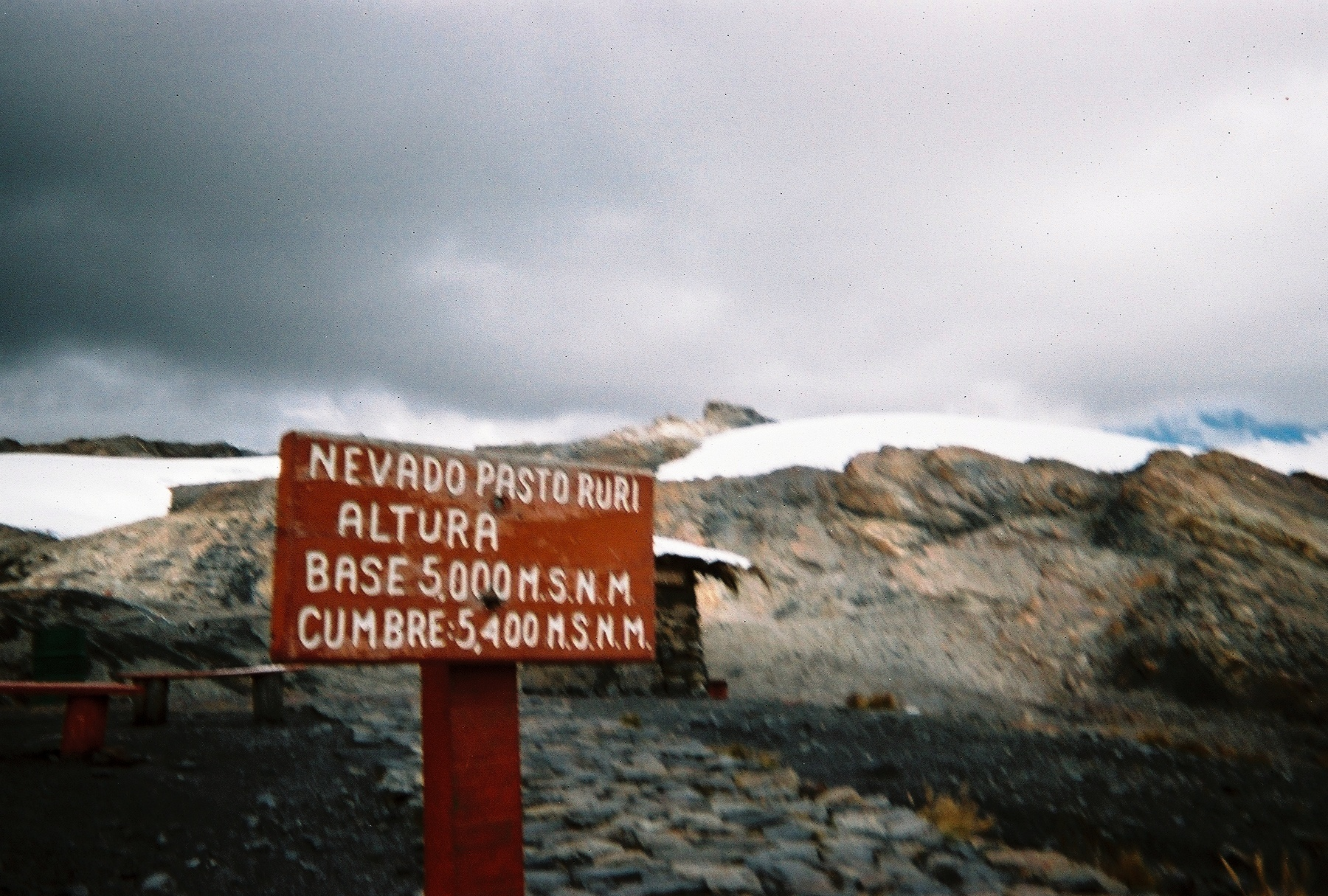
The receding Pastoruri glacier

The climate in the valley is subtropical and dry. The rainy season lasts from October to April, during which time it can rain nearly every afternoon. The yearly average temperature is 16.6 °C in the daytime and 12.6 °C at night.

As rainy seasons get less rainy and dry seasons get hotter and drier, climate change has become a very worrisome topic for the Peruvian government. As glaciers continue to recede, there is much worry that many glaciers such as the popular tourist site Pastoruri will disappear in as little as 20 years. This will threaten the very existence of many towns who depend on glacial runoff as their primary water source, and will likely lead to increased migration to the cities as glacial rivers dry up.

Furthermore, as the region heats up, parasites such as mosquitoes are able to survive the rainy season and live at increasingly high altitudes that were previously uninhabitable for them. These trends pose a danger to public health in the region, and will also likely contribute to pressures on the government to address the changing environment of the Callejón de Huaylas.

== Tourism ==
The valley is an excellent tourist destination both for Peruvians and foreigners, and the city of Huaraz is home to a variety of local tour agencies that organize trips to the major attractions. Tourists come primarily for trekking and mountaineering, though the region also offers opportunities for adventure sports such as skiing, paragliding and rafting, as well as archaeology and botany.

Pre-Inca ruins such as those at Chavín de Huantar, a relic of the Chavín culture which spanned 900 to 300 BCE have been preserved and studied and provide a significant tourist attraction.

== Climbing ==
The climbing season coincides with the summer in the northern hemisphere, as the dry season spans from roughly May to September. Multiple climbing routes have been opened and detailed on most of the peaks of the Cordillera Blanca, ranging in difficulty from E to ES, and the Huaraz Guide Association guides climbers of all levels to virtually any peak in the region.

Because of the tropical heat of the Callejón, the snow line sits above 5,000 m during the dry season. Most climbs between 5,000 m and 6,000 m are typically done in two days: one day of approach and one day to summit. Nevado Huascarán, the highest peak in the range, is typically climbed in three days by a variety of routes.

There are many difficult climbs in the region, and many have died on the peaks of the Cordillera Blanca. Snow conditions in the area are unlike those in the rest of the world, and many inexperienced climbers attempt to climb beyond their means or without spending enough time to acclimatise because of the relative technical ease of some of the lesser peaks. Although guide service prices may appear high when compared with the general prices of things in Peru, they are lower than in other climbing regions of the world and are an important way to minimize risk.

== See also ==
- Ancash Region
