= Kushuru =

Mountain in Peru

- Location within Peru

Highest point
- Elevation: 5,000 m (16,000 ft)
- Coordinates: 8°52′50″S 77°59′00″W

Geography
- Location: Peru, Ancash Region
- Parent range: Cordillera Negra

Kushuru (Ancash Quechua for an edible kind of seaweed, also spelled Cushuro) is a mountain in the northern part of the Cordillera Negra in the Andes of Peru, about 5,000 m (16,000 ft) high. It is situated in the Ancash Region, Huaylas Province, Santo Toribio District, and in the Santa Province, Cáceres del Perú District. Kushuru lies between Yana Yaku in the southeast and Quñuqranra in the northwest, east of Ichik Wiri.
