= Cáceres del Perú District =

Coordinates: 9°00′00″S 78°10′01″W

Cáceres del Perú
- District
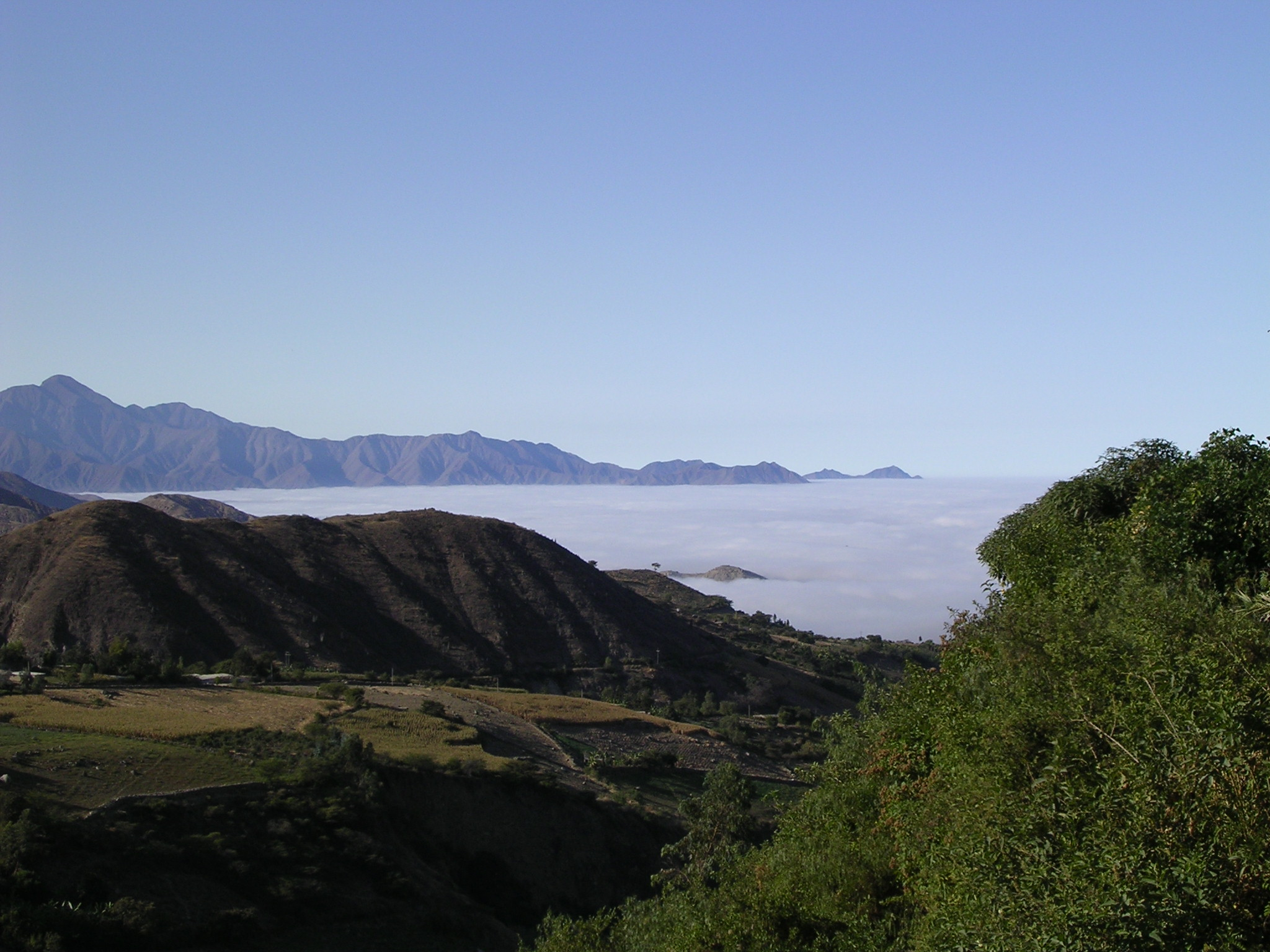
- Jimbe

- Location of Cáceres del Perú in the Santa province
- Country: Peru
- Region: Ancash
- Province: Santa
- Founded: October 13, 1886
- Capital: Jimbe

Area
  - Total: 549.78 km^{2} (212.27 sq mi)
- Elevation: 1,203 m (3,947 ft)

Population (2005 census)
  - Total: 4,994
  - Density: 9.084/km^{2} (23.53/sq mi)
- Time zone: UTC-5 (PET)
- UBIGEO: 021802

Cáceres del Perú District is one of nine districts of the Santa Province in the Ancash Region in Peru.

The province was named after the Peruvian president Andrés Avelino Cáceres.

== See also ==
- Hatun Hirka
- Kushuru
- Puka Punta
- Qarwaqucha
- Quñuqranra
- Yana Yaku
