= Pamparomas District =

Coordinates: 9°04′12″S 77°58′48″W

Pamparomas Pamparumas
- District
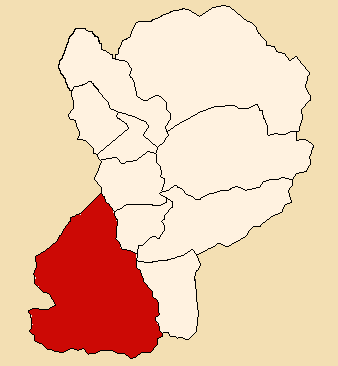
- Location of Pamparomas in the Huaylas province
- Country: Peru
- Region: Ancash
- Province: Huaylas
- Founded: January 2, 1857
- Capital: Pamparomas
- Subdivisions: 43 hamlets

Government
  - Mayor: Adrián Palmadera Milla (2012)

Area
  - Total: 496.35 km^{2} (191.64 sq mi)
- Elevation: 2,862 m (9,390 ft)

Population (2002 est.)
  - Total: 9,484
  - Density: 19.11/km^{2} (49.49/sq mi)
- Time zone: UTC-5 (PET)
- UBIGEO: 021206
- Website: munipamparomas.gob.pe

The Pamparomas District is one of 10 districts of the Huaylas Province in the Ancash Region of Peru. The capital of the district is the village of Pamparomas. The district was founded on January 2, 1857.

== Location ==
The district is located in the south-western part of the province at an elevation of 2,862m in the Cordillera Negra (Spanish for black mountain range). The capital of the province, Caraz, is located at a distance of 80 km. The nearest large city is Chimbote, located on the pacific coast at a distance of 140 km from Pamparomas.

== Geography ==
One of the highest peaks of the district is Simiyuq Wank'a at approximately 4,600 m (15,100 ft). Other mountains are listed below:

- Allqu Rukutu
- Ch'ampa Hirka Punta
- Hatun Hirka
- Hatun Kunka
- Ichik Punta
- Kachi P'unqu
- Kukuli
- Kuntur Marka
- Kuntuyuq
- Kurakayuq
- Paka Qutu
- Pampa Kancha
- Parya Qutu
- Puka Qaqa
- Putaqa
- Qaqa Rumi Kunka
- Qarwa Qhari
- T'uru Punta
- Wamp'u
- Wamp'u (Huaylas-Yungay)
- Yawri
- Yuraq Waqta

== Political division ==
The district is divided into 43 hamlets (Spanish: caseríos, singular: caserío):

=== Pamparomas Valley ===
- Racratumanca
- Karka
- Pampap
- Llacta
- Marco
- Perkirka
- Puquio
- San Juanito
- Chorrillos
- Pueblo Pamparomas
- Queropuquio
- Carash
- Ullpan
- Achauas

=== Chaclancayo Valley ===
- Cajabamba Alta
- Cajabamba Baja
- Putaca
- Chaclancayo
- Punin
- Marmay
- Cullashcunca
- Huaracpampa
- Chunya Ruri
- Santa rosa de Coto
- Santa Rosa de Catedral
- Chunya
- Pías

=== Pisha Valley ===
- Nununga
- Ocshapampa
- Antaraca
- Pucará
- Pisha
- Quicacayan
- Carampa
- Pampacancha
- Huarac-huran
- Pichiu
- Carap
- Huáscar
- Carachuco
- Capan
- Huanchuy
- Cajay

== Ethnic groups ==
The people in the district are mainly indigenous citizens of Quechua descent. Quechua is the language which the majority of the population (81.62%) learnt to speak in childhood, 18.19% of the residents started speaking using the Spanish language (2007 Peru Census).
