= Huacllan District =

Huacllan
- District
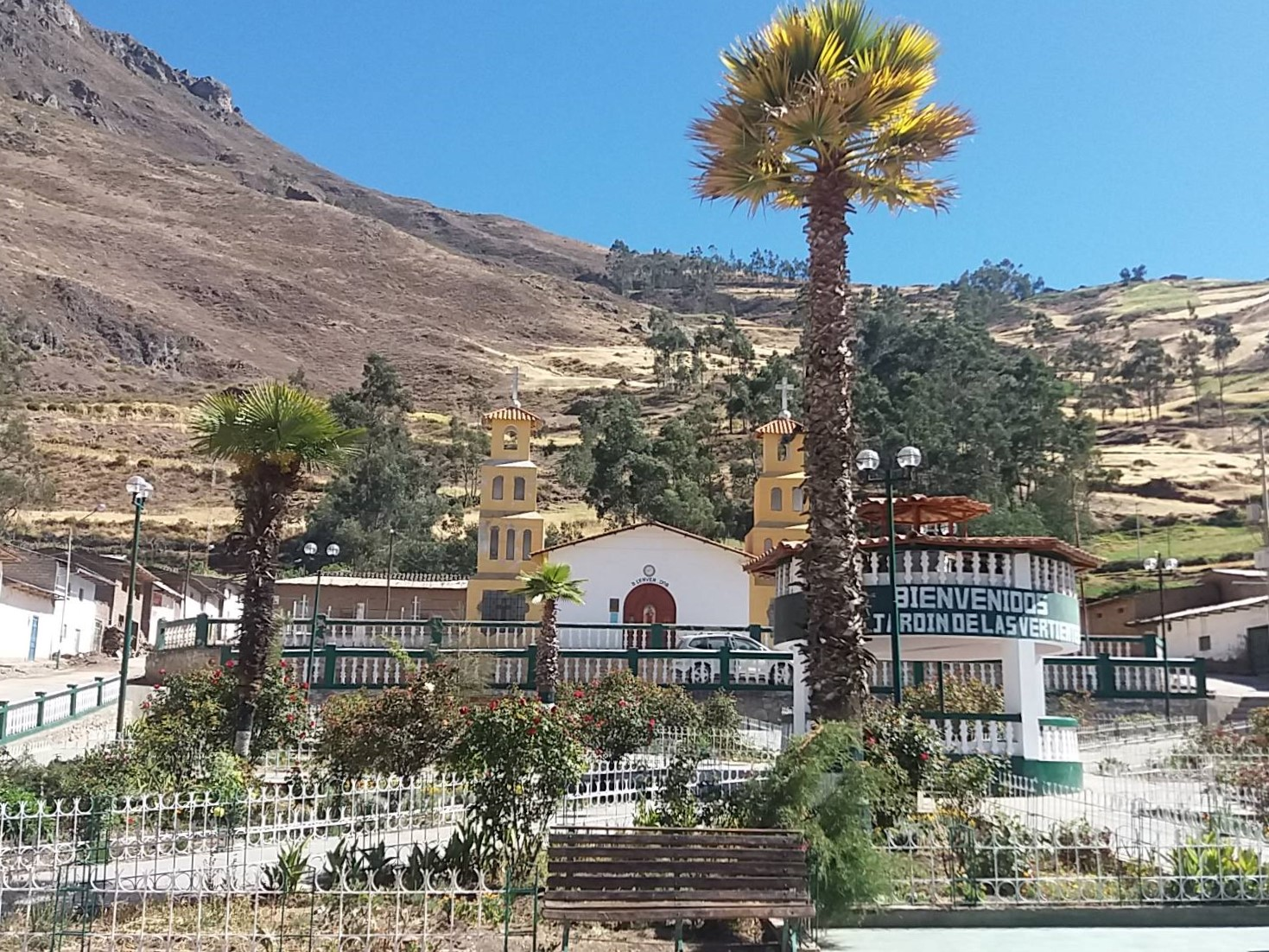
- Huacllán square
- Interactive map of Huacllan
- Coordinates: 9°47′53.53″S 77°40′31.24″W
- Country: Peru
- Region: Ancash
- Province: Aija
- Founded: March 5, 1936
- Capital: Huacllan

Government
  - Mayor: Wenceslao Lorenzo Hidalgo Gomero (2007)

Area
  - Total: 37.91 km^{2} (14.64 sq mi)
- Elevation: 2,986 m (9,797 ft)

Population (2017)
  - Total: 364
  - Density: 9.60/km^{2} (24.9/sq mi)
- Time zone: UTC-5 (PET)
- UBIGEO: 020203

Huacllan District is one of 5 districts in the Aija Province, of the Ancash Region in Peru. Its population was 364 as of the 2017 census.

== History ==
Simultaneously with the creation of the province of Aija, by Law N°8188, Huacllan was elevated to the category of District. The degree of obtained advance and the progressive eagerness of its population, justified this promotion. Previously it had been an annex of the Succha District.

== Capital ==
The district's capital is the town of Huacllán, located on the slopes of the Condorkaka at an elevation of 3.083 m. Its more important locality is San Isidro.
