= Puma Puñunan =

Mountain in Peru

- Location within Peru

Highest point
- Elevation: 4,600 m (15,100 ft)
- Coordinates: 9°47′54″S 77°32′02″W

Geography
- Location: Peru, Ancash Region
- Parent range: Andes, Cordillera Negra

Puma Puñuna (Quechua puma cougar, puñuna bed, "cougar bed", -n a suffix, also spelled Pumapununan) is a mountain in the Cordillera Negra in the Andes of Peru which reaches a height of approximately 4,600 m (15,100 ft). It lies in the Ancash Region, Aija Province, Aija District, southwest of Wank'ap'iti.
