= Santo Toribio District =

Coordinates: 8°52′14″S 77°54′19″W

Santo Toribio
- District
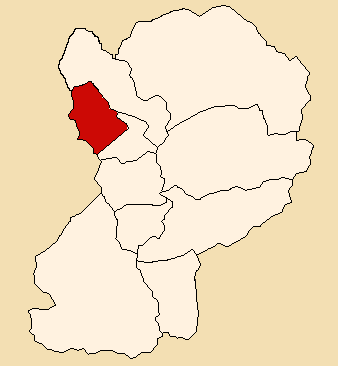
- Location of Santo Toribio in the Huaylas province
- Country: Peru
- Region: Ancash
- Province: Huaylas
- Founded: June 19, 1990
- Capital: Santo Toribio

Government
  - Mayor: Florentino Felipe Villafana Pajuelo (2007)

Area
  - Total: 82.02 km^{2} (31.67 sq mi)
- Elevation: 2,860 m (9,380 ft)

Population (2005 census)
  - Total: 1,774
  - Density: 21.63/km^{2} (56.02/sq mi)
- Time zone: UTC-5 (PET)
- UBIGEO: 021209
- Website: munisantotoribio.gob.pe

The Santo Toribio District (Spanish: Distrito de Santo Toribio) is one of 10 districts of the Huaylas Province in the Ancash Region of Peru. The capital of the district is the village of Santo Toribio.

== Location ==
The district is located in the north-western part of the province at an elevation of 2,860m.

== Populated places ==
Populated places in the district with the number of households in parentheses.

- Santo Toribio (288)
- Pashpac (7)
- Quisuar (8)
- Tambo (13)
- San Lorenzo (44)
- Union Bellavista (67)
- Quitacocha (1)
- Rurin Ura (2)
- Iscap (229)
- Huayran (222)
- Quecuas (193)
- Nahuinyacup (60)
- Cullash Punro (1)

== See also ==
- Kushuru
