= Yana Yaku =

Mountain in Peru

- Location within Peru

Highest point
- Elevation: 4,800 m (15,700 ft)
- Coordinates: 8°54′35″S 77°57′48″W

Geography
- Location: Peru, Ancash Region
- Parent range: Cordillera Negra

Yana Yaku (Quechua yana black, yaku water, "black water", Hispanicized spelling Yanayacu) is a mountain in the northern part of the Cordillera Negra in the Andes of Peru, about 4,800 metres (15,748 ft) high. It is situated in the Ancash Region, Santa Province, Cáceres del Perú District. Yana Yaku lies between Qarwaqucha in the southeast and Quñuqranra in the northwest, west of Rumi Cruz.
