= Mato District =

Coordinates: 8°52′14″S 77°54′19″W

Mato
- District
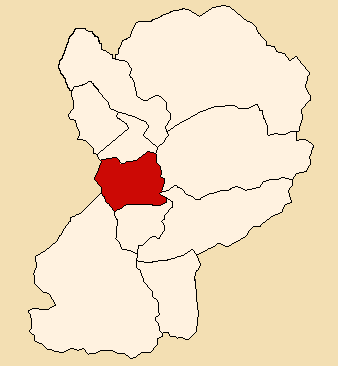
- Location of Mato in the Huaylas province
- Country: Peru
- Region: Ancash
- Province: Huaylas
- Founded: January 2, 1857
- Capital: Villa Sucre
- Subdivisions: 1 village, 4 hamlets and 19 anexos

Government
  - Mayor: Victor Hilario Jamanca Cueva

Area
  - Total: 113.97 km^{2} (44.00 sq mi)
- Elevation: 2,239 m (7,346 ft)
- Time zone: UTC-5 (PET)
- UBIGEO: 021205
- Website: munimato.gob.pe

The Mato District (Spanish: Distrito de Mato) is one of 10 districts of the Huaylas Province in the Ancash Region of Peru. The capital of the district is the village of Villa Sucre.

== History ==
The district was founded on January 2, 1857.

== Location ==
The district is located in the west-central part of the province at an elevation of 2,239m in the black mountains (Spanish: Cordillera Negra), neighboring district is the Caraz district in which the provinces capital Caraz is located, 12 km from the village of Villa Sucre. The regions capital Huaraz is located at 79 km from Villa Sucre.

== Political division ==
The district is divided into 1 village (Spanish: pueblos, singular: pueblo), 4 hamlets (Spanish: caseríos, singular: caserío) and 19 (Spanish: anexos, singular: anexo):

=== Villages ===
- Villa Sucre

=== Hamlets ===
- Ancoracá
- Huacanhuasi
- Huáncup
- Huinó

=== Anexos ===
- Atún Corral
- Carmen
- Cata
- Cochamarca
- Cruz Viva
- Huacapununan
- Huashuash
- Huarinya
- Hueto
- Huishca
- Malambo
- Manzana
- Muchup
- Ocona pampa alto y bajo
- Poma chuco alto y bajo
- Puca
- Quinquín
- San Diego
- Teja Huai

== Capital ==
The capital of the Mato district is the village of Villa Sucre.

== See also ==
- Puka Punta
