= Puka Punta (Ancash) =

Mountain in Peru

- Location within Peru

Highest point
- Elevation: 4,800 m (15,700 ft)
- Coordinates: 8°58′15″S 77°56′27″W

Geography
- Location: Peru, Ancash Region
- Parent range: Andes, Cordillera Negra

Puka Punta (Quechua puka red, punta peak; ridge, "red peak (or ridge)", also spelled Pucapunta) is a mountain in the Cordillera Negra in the Andes of Peru. It reaches a height of approximately 4,800 m (15,700 ft).

It is located in the Ancash Region, Huaylas Province, Mato District, and in the Santa Province, Cáceres del Perú District. Puka Punta lies southeast of a mountain and lake named Qarwaqucha.
