= Yana Kunkush =

Mountain in Peru

- Location within Peru

Highest point
- Elevation: 4,600 m (15,100 ft)
- Coordinates: 9°51′04″S 77°29′03″W

Geography
- Location: Peru, Ancash
- Parent range: Cordillera Negra

Yana Kunkush (Quechua yana black, Ancash Quechua kunkush Puya raimondii, "black puya raimondii (mountain)", also spelled Yanacuncush) is a mountain in the southern part of the Cordillera Negra in the Andes of Peru, about 4,600 metres (15,092 ft) high. It is situated in the Ancash Region, Aija Province, Aija District, and in the Recuay Province, Catac District. Yana Kunkush lies southeast of Sach'a Hirka and east of a lake of that name.
