= La Merced District, Aija =

Coordinates: 9°43′59″S 77°37′01″W

La Merced
- District
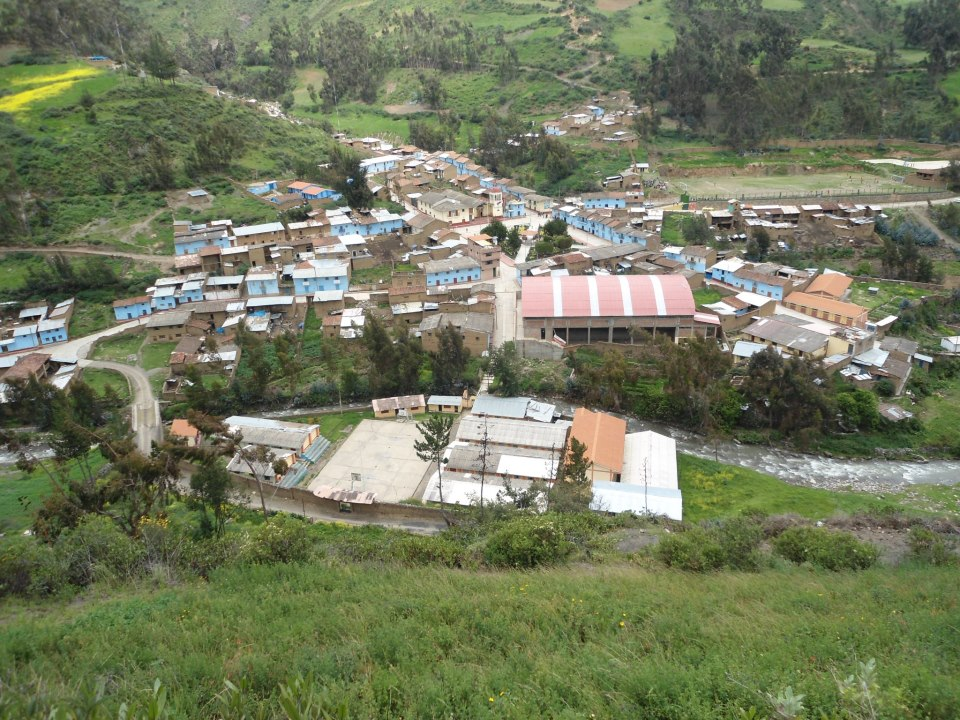
- La Merced
- Interactive map of La Merced
- Country: Peru
- Region: Ancash
- Province: Aija
- Founded: March 5, 1936
- Capital: La Merced

Government
  - Mayor: Magaly ROLDAN CAMONES (2023)

Area
  - Total: 153.08 km^{2} (59.10 sq mi)
- Elevation: 3,272 m (10,735 ft)

Population (2002 est.)
  - Total: 1,582
  - Density: 10.33/km^{2} (26.77/sq mi)
- Time zone: UTC-5 (PET)
- UBIGEO: 020204

La Merced District is one of five districts in the Aija Province of the Ancash Region in Peru. It is located between 77°43 ´ 57 " S and 77°35 ´ 51 " W with an average altitude of 3,272 m.s.n.m. Its population was 1582 as of the 2017 census.

== See also ==
- Puka Hirka
- Puma Wayin
