= Simiyuq Wank'a =

Mountain in Peru

- Location within Peru

Highest point
- Elevation: 4,600 m (15,100 ft)
- Coordinates: 9°00′41″S 77°57′44″W

Geography
- Location: Peru, Ancash Region
- Parent range: Andes, Cordillera Negra

Simiyuq Wank'a (Quechua simi mouth, -yuq a suffix, wank'a rock, "rock with a mouth", also spelled Simi Ojhuanca, Simiyojhuanca) is a mountain in the Cordillera Negra in the Andes of Peru which reaches a height of approximately 4,600 m (15,100 ft). It is located in the Ancash Region, Huaylas Province, Pamparomas District.
