= Qaqa Rumi Kunka =

Mountain in Peru

- Location within Peru

Highest point
- Elevation: 4,600 m (15,100 ft)
- Coordinates: 9°15′05″S 77°52′41″W

Geography
- Location: Peru, Ancash Region
- Parent range: Andes, Cordillera Negra

Qaqa Rumi Kunka (Quechua qaqa rock, rumi stone, kunka throat, gullet, "rock stone throat", also spelled Cajarumicunca) is a mountain in the Cordillera Negra in the Andes of Peru which reaches a height of approximately 4,600 m (15,100 ft). It is located in the Ancash Region, Huaylas Province, Pamparomas District, and in the Yungay Province, Quillo District.
