= Puka Hirka (Aija-Recuay) =

Mountain in Peru

- Location within Peru

Highest point
- Elevation: 4,600 m (15,100 ft)
- Coordinates: 9°44′14″S 77°32′10″W

Geography
- Location: Peru, Ancash Region
- Parent range: Andes, Cordillera Negra

Puka Hirka (Quechua puka red, hirka mountain, "red mountain", hispanicized spelling Pucairca) is a mountain in the Cordillera Negra in the Andes of Peru, about 4,600 m (15,100 ft) high. It is situated in the Ancash Region, Aija Province, on the border of the districts of Aija and La Merced, in the Huaraz Province, Huaraz District, and in the Recuay Province, Recuay District.
