= Pillaka =

Mountain in Peru

- Location within Peru

Highest point
- Elevation: 4,800 m (15,700 ft)
- Coordinates: 9°51′39″S 77°38′03″W

Geography
- Location: Peru, Ancash Region
- Parent range: Andes, Cordillera Negra

Pillaka (Quechua for a two-colored llawt'u, also spelled Pillaca) is a mountain in the Cordillera Negra in the Andes of Peru which reaches a height of approximately 4,800 m (15,700 ft). It is located in the Ancash Region, Aija Province, Succha District, and the Huarmey Province, Huayan District.
