= Hatun Hirka (Huaylas-Santa) =

Mountain in Peru

- Location within Peru

Highest point
- Elevation: 3,400 m (11,200 ft)
- Coordinates: 9°02′46″S 78°00′54″W

Geography
- Location: Peru, Ancash Region
- Parent range: Andes, Cordillera Negra

Hatun Hirka (Quechua hatun big, hirka mountain, "big mountain", also spelled Atun Irca) is a mountain in the Cordillera Negra in the Andes of Peru which reaches a height of approximately 3,400 m (11,200 ft). It is located in the Ancash Region, Huaylas Province, Pamparomas District, and in the Santa Province, Cáceres del Perú District, northwest of Pamparomas. It borders the Pacific Ocean.
