= Puma Wayin (Aija) =

Mountain in Peru

- Location within Peru

Highest point
- Elevation: 4,400 m (14,400 ft)
- Coordinates: 9°41′54″S 77°33′55″W

Geography
- Location: Peru, Ancash Region
- Parent range: Andes, Cordillera Negra

Puma Wayin (Quechua puma cougar, puma, Ancash Quechua wayi house, "cougar house", -n a suffix, also spelled Pumahuain) is a mountain in the Cordillera Negra in the Andes of Peru which reaches a height of approximately 4,400 m (14,436 ft). It is located in the Ancash Region, Aija Province, La Merced District.
