= Pamparomas =

- Village
- Interactive map of Pamparomas
- Coordinates: 9°4′24″S 77°58′57″W
- Country: Peru
- Region: Ancash Region
- Province: Huaylas Province
- District: Pamparomas District

Government
  - Mayor: Rolando Roger Murillo Loayza
- Elevation: 2,862 m (9,390 ft)

Pamparomas is a village in the Pamparomas District of the Huaylas Province in the Ancash Region of Peru. It is the capital of the district with the same name: Pamparomas District. According to the Pamparomas research center, the name comes from the "Roma" profile of the surrounding hillsides.

== Facilities ==
Pamparomas is the largest village in the district of Pamparomas, and is home to the municipal offices, main church, and health center that serve the wider area. It is supplied with power from the national grid, but is not currently connected to national land phone services. Businesses in the town provide telephone service.

== Location ==
Pamparomas is located in the Black Mountain range Cordillera Negra in the south-east of the Huaylas Province. It is accessible by mountain road from Caraz and Moro (towards Chimbote), and daily buses connect the village with each location.
