= Recuay District =

Coordinates: 9°43′01″S 77°28′01″W

Recuay
- District
- Interactive map of Recuay
- Country: Peru
- Region: Ancash
- Province: Recuay
- Capital: Recuay, Peru

Area
  - Total: 142.96 km^{2} (55.20 sq mi)
- Elevation: 3,394 m (11,135 ft)

Population (2005 census)
  - Total: 5,186
  - Density: 36.28/km^{2} (93.95/sq mi)
- Time zone: UTC-5 (PET)
- UBIGEO: 021701

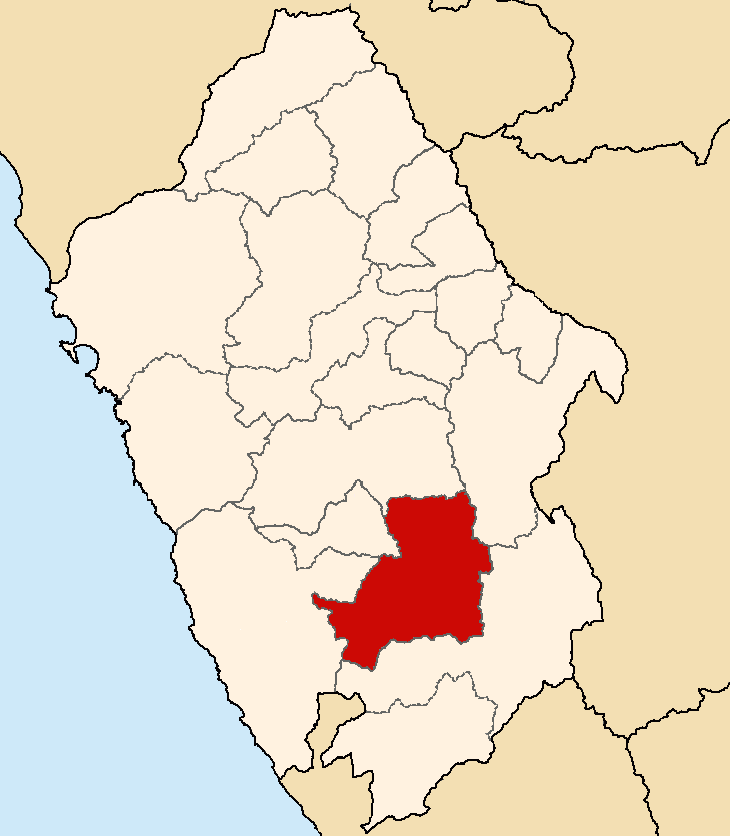
Location of Recuay in Ancash

Recuay District is one of ten districts of the Recuay Province in Peru.

Its capital is the town of Recuay in the Callejón de Huaylas Valley.

== Recuay culture ==
The Recuay culture was a highland culture of Peru that flourished in 200 BC-600 AD and was related to the Moche culture of the north coast. It is named after the Recuay area.

The Recuay area is very close to the earlier Chavin culture centre of Chavin de Huantar that lies just to the west. Thus, the Recuay originally occupied much of the territory of the Chavin, and were greatly influenced by them.

The culture especially flourished in the Callejón de Huaylas region, and along the Marañón River. It also spread to the valleys of the Santa, Casma and Huarmey rivers. To the north, it reached the area of Pashash, in Pallasca. Willkawayin was one of their important settlements.

== Climate ==
Climate data for Recuay, elevation 3,431 m (11,257 ft), (1991–2020)
Month	Jan	Feb	Mar	Apr	May	Jun	Jul	Aug	Sep	Oct	Nov	Dec	Year
Mean daily maximum °C (°F)	20.4 (68.7)	20.1 (68.2)	19.7 (67.5)	20.5 (68.9)	21.2 (70.2)	21.6 (70.9)	21.9 (71.4)	22.3 (72.1)	22.1 (71.8)	21.3 (70.3)	21.0 (69.8)	20.6 (69.1)	21.1 (69.9)
Mean daily minimum °C (°F)	6.1 (43.0)	6.4 (43.5)	6.4 (43.5)	5.8 (42.4)	4.0 (39.2)	1.8 (35.2)	0.8 (33.4)	1.3 (34.3)	3.3 (37.9)	4.8 (40.6)	5.1 (41.2)	5.8 (42.4)	4.3 (39.7)
Average precipitation mm (inches)	116.6 (4.59)	127.5 (5.02)	173.5 (6.83)	95.1 (3.74)	30.9 (1.22)	6.4 (0.25)	2.1 (0.08)	5.6 (0.22)	28.9 (1.14)	67.1 (2.64)	71.4 (2.81)	111.4 (4.39)	836.5 (32.93)
Source: National Meteorology and Hydrology Service of Peru

== See also ==
- Puka Allpa
- Puka Hirka
