= Recuay culture =

Pre-Columbian culture of highland Peru

Recuay
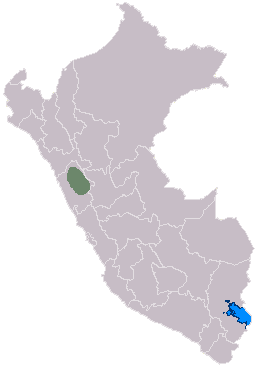
- Map of the Recuay culture
- Geographical range: Callejón de Huaylas
- Period: Early Intermediate
- Dates: c. 200 BCE – 600 CE
- Preceded by: Chavín culture
- Followed by: Wari culture

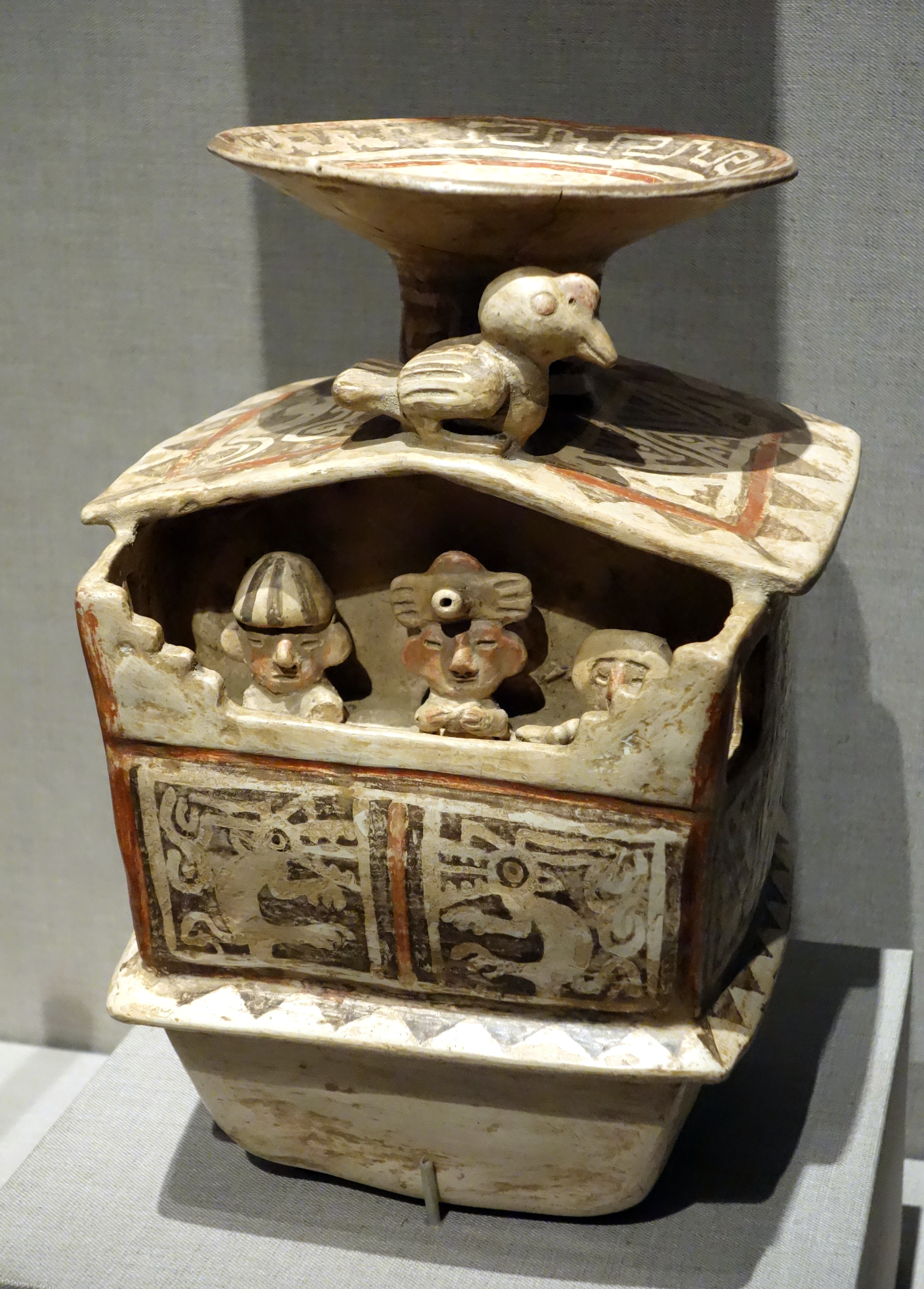
Vessel in the form of a palace or tomb with a wall frieze, Recuay, 200 BCE – 600 CE, De Young Museum

The Recuay culture was a pre-Columbian culture of highland Peru that flourished from 200 BCE to 600 CE and was related to the Moche culture of the north coast. It is named after the Recuay District, in the Recuay Province, in the Ancash Region of Peru.

== Territory ==
This culture developed in the Callejón de Huaylas valley, and its artistic style is also known as "Huaylas."

The Recuay area is very close to the area of the earlier Chavín culture. The important site of the latter, Chavin de Huantar, lies just to the west. Recuay people came to occupy much of the territory of the Chavín and were influenced by them. Chavín influences are seen in architecture (for instance, in the use of underground galleries) and in stonework, such as in sculpture and steles. The Recuay ceramics were also influenced by the Moche culture.

While the Peruvian coastal cultures of that time, such as the Moche, the Lima, and the Nasca, are much better known, the high sierra also saw the emergence of powerful cultural polities. These were the Cajamarca in the north, the Huarpa in central highlands, and the Pucará in the Titicaca highlands.

The relationship between the Recuay and the Moche state in the north must have been rather tense because they shared borders and competed for the same water sources. There is evidence of considerable warfare, and of the warrior-oriented society as reflected in their fortified buildings and iconography. In fact, the Recuay are associated with the earliest emergence of fortified centres and towns in the Peruvian Andes.

Recuay peoples built rectangular-shaped tombs with multiple rooms and levels.

The culture especially flourished in the Callejón de Huaylas region, and along the Marañón River. It also spread to the valleys of the Santa, Casma and Huarmey rivers. To the north, it reached the area of Pashash, in Pallasca. Willkawayin was one of their important settlements.

== Ceramics ==
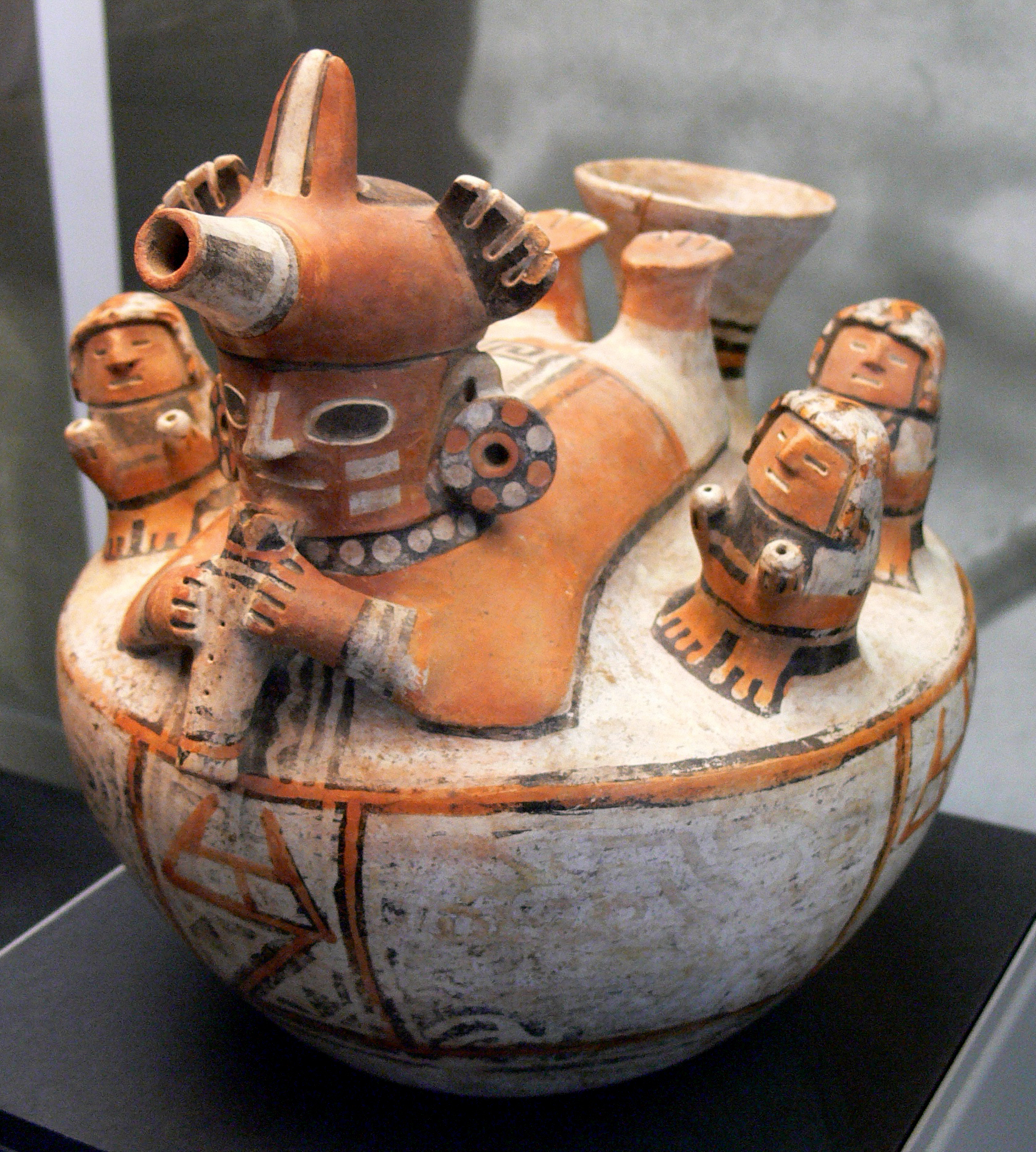
A vessel with musicians, 21.5 cm high; Recuay area, Peru, 100 BCE – 300 CE, collection of the Kloster Allerheiligen, Schaffhausen, Switzerland

Recuay culture features a distinctive pottery with decoration in three colors: black, red, and white. Recuay potters sculptured small figures of humans, jaguars, llamas, and other animals, which they attached to the vessel. Their pottery is related to Virú cultural pottery (also known as Gallinazo). The Viru Valley lies just north of the Recuay area.

Like the Cajamarca, Recuay ceramics used kaolin clay, which involved highly complex work; the ceramics acquired a white color after firing. One of the central figures in Recuay art is the so-called "moon animal," a foxlike or feline animal with a long, toothy snout and head crest.

== Other art forms ==
Recuay textiles were of very high quality, and used similar decorative motifs as the ceramics.

Recuay stone carvings called Aija are found throughout the Peruvian Highlands. They are related to those of the Pucará and Tiwanaku cultures.

== Pashash culture ==
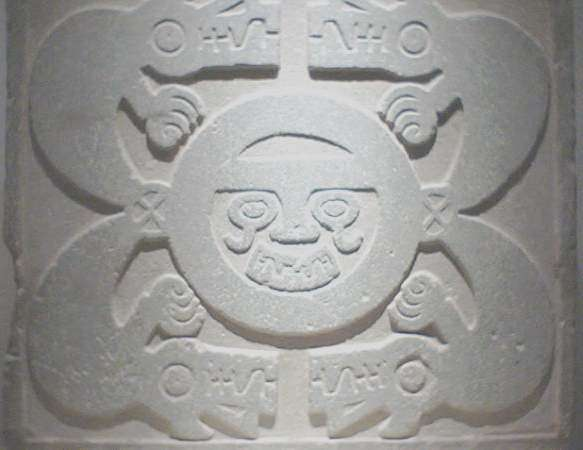
Engraved stone from Cabana. Belongs to the Pashash culture, around 500 CE

Pashash culture (500 – 1000 CE) is seen as a later development of Recuay culture. It developed in the northern Sierra de Ancash (Cabana) region. Its remains are found in Chacas, a town located in the east-central region of Ancash, in Cabana, Peru, also in Ancash, and in other places.

Metallurgy was also advanced at this time. At Pashash, very fine Recuay style jewelry of gilt arsenic bronze were excavated, as well as fine pottery; the dates are between AD 300 and 600.

== See also ==
- Yaynu
- Aija, Peru
