= Putaqa (Ancash) =

Mountain in Peru

- Location within Peru

Highest point
- Elevation: 4,200 m (13,800 ft)
- Coordinates: 9°04′39″S 77°56′20″W

Geography
- Location: Peru, Ancash Region
- Parent range: Andes, Cordillera Negra

Putaqa (Quechua for Rumex peruanus, also spelled Putaca) is a mountain in the Cordillera Negra in the Andes of Peru which reaches a height of approximately 4,200 m (13,800 ft). It is located in the Ancash Region, Huaylas Province, Pamparomas District. A small lake named Aququcha (Quechua for "sand lake") lies at its feet.
