= Huampo (Huaylas) =

Mountain in Peru

- Location within Peru

Highest point
- Elevation: 4,400 m (14,400 ft)
- Coordinates: 9°09′23″S 77°53′25″W

Geography
- Location: Peru, Ancash Region
- Parent range: Andes, Cordillera Negra

Huampo or Wamp'u (Quechua for boat, also spelled Huampu) is a mountain in the Cordillera Negra in the Andes of Peru which reaches a height of approximately 4,400 m (14,400 ft). It is located in the Ancash Region, Huaylas Province, Pamparomas District.
