= Yuraq Yaku (Aija) =

Mountain in Peru

- Location within Peru

Highest point
- Elevation: 4,400 m (14,400 ft)
- Coordinates: 9°51′37″S 77°30′28″W

Geography
- Location: Peru, Ancash Region
- Parent range: Andes, Cordillera Negra

Yuraq Yaku (Quechua yuraq white, yaku water, "white water", also spelled Yurac Yaco) is a mountain in the Cordillera Negra in the Andes of Peru which reaches a height of approximately 4,400 m (14,436 ft). It is located in the Ancash Region, Aija Province, Aija District.
