= Sach'a Hirka =

Mountain in Peru

- Location within Peru

Highest point
- Elevation: 4,600 m (15,100 ft)
- Coordinates: 9°50′16″S 77°29′39″W

Geography
- Location: Peru, Ancash Region
- Parent range: Andes, Cordillera Negra

Sach'a Hirka (Quechua sach'a tree, Ancash Quechua hirka mountain, "tree mountain", also spelled Sachajirca) is a mountain in the Cordillera Negra in the Andes of Peru which reaches a height of approximately 4,600 m (15,100 ft). It lies in the Ancash Region on the border of the Aija Province, Aija District, and the Recuay Province, Catac District. Sach'a Hirka lies northwest of Yana Kunkush.
