= Succha District =

Coordinates: 9°25′01″S 77°13′01″W

Succha
- District
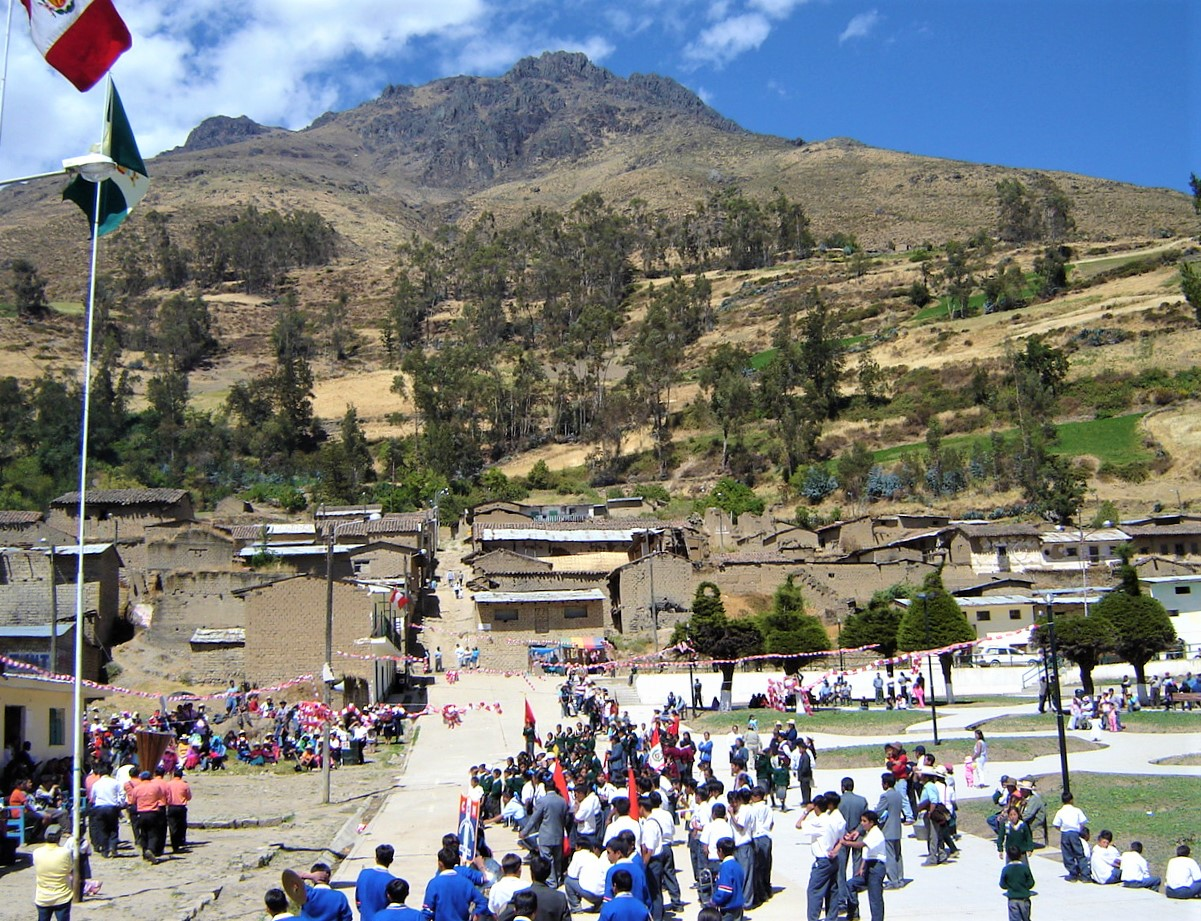
- Plaza of Succha
- Interactive map of Succha
- Country: Peru
- Region: Ancash
- Province: Aija
- Founded: December 21, 1907
- Capital: Villa de Succha

Government
  - Mayor: Aquiles Florencio Ortiz Leon (2007)

Area
  - Total: 78.84 km^{2} (30.44 sq mi)
- Elevation: 3,129 m (10,266 ft)

Population (2017)
  - Total: 714
  - Density: 9.06/km^{2} (23.5/sq mi)
- Time zone: UTC-5 (PET)
- UBIGEO: 020205

Succha District is one of five districts in the Aija Province, of the Ancash Region in Peru. The capital of the district is Villa de Succha. Its population was 714 as of the 2017 census.

== See also ==
- Pillaka
