= Aija (given name) =

- Gender: Female
- Name day: 12 March

Origin
- Meaning: sway, cradle or from refrain 'aijā!' in lullabies
- Region of origin: Latvia

Aija is a feminine Latvian given name and may refer to:

- Aija Andrejeva (born 1986), Latvian singer
- Aija Barča (born 1949), Latvian politician
- Aija Bārzdiņa, Latvian fashion model
- Aija Brumermane (born 1986), Latvian basketball player
- Aija Edwards, American curler
- Aija Jurjāne (born 1988), Latvian basketball player
- Aija Klakocka (born 1986), Latvian basketball player
- Aija Kukule (born 1956), Latvian singer
- Aija Putniņa (born 1988), Latvian basketball player
- Aija Salo (born 1977), Finnish politician
- Aija Tērauda, Latvian model
