= Wank'ap'iti =

Mountain in Peru

- Location within Peru

Highest point
- Elevation: 4,976 m (16,325 ft)
- Coordinates: 9°47′14″S 77°31′29″W

Geography
- Location: Peru, Ancash Region
- Parent range: Andes, Cordillera Negra

Wank'ap'iti (Quechua wank'a rock, p'iti dividing by pulling powerfully to the extremes; gap, interruption, Hispanicized spelling Huancapeti, Huancapetí, Huancapete) is a 4,976-metre-high (16,325 ft) mountain in the Cordillera Negra in the Andes of Peru. It is situated in the Ancash Region, Aija Province, Aija District, and in the Recuay Province, Ticapampa District. Wank'ap'iti lies southeast of Puka Allpa.
