= Karwa =

Wikimedia disambiguation page

Karwa may refer to:

- Dhairya Karwa (born 1990) Indian actor
- Payal Shah Karwa Indian author
