= The East of Ankash =

The East of Ankash is a zone near the Cordillera Blanca mountain range in the Ancash region of Peru. The valley is the home of the archaeological site of the remains of Chavín de Huantar, which dates from the year 900, and was a ceremonial center in which human sacrifices were made.

== Tourism ==
Besides the archaeological ruins of Chavín de Huantar that are regularly visited by students and foreign tourists, the East of Ankash has a number of natural attractions, including its thermo-medicinal waters, scenery, hunting places, and the archaeological places that fascinated Julio C. Tello and other specialists.
