= Aija, Peru =

Aija
- Town
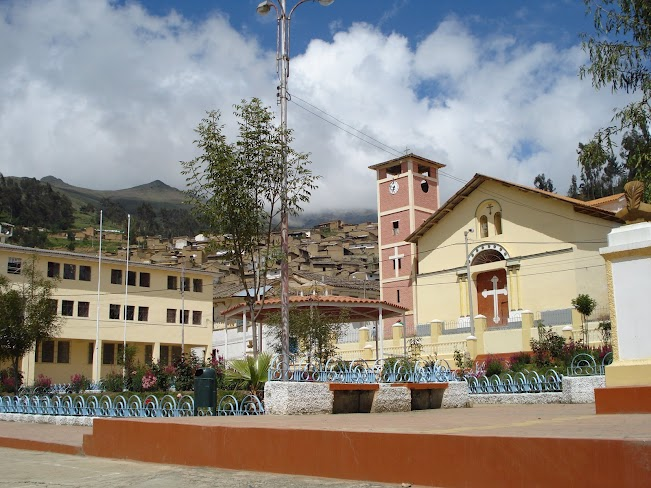
- Main square of Aija

- Location within Peru
- Coordinates: 9°46′S 77°38′W
- Country: Peru
- Region: Ancash
- Province: Aija
- District: Aija

Government
  - Mayor: German Ignacio Hizo Requena

Aija is a town in central Peru, capital of the province Aija in the region Ancash, on the west side of the Cordillera Negra.

The famous scientist Santiago Antúnez de Mayolo was born here.

In ancient times, the city was one of the centres of Recuay culture.

Stone sculpture belonging to Recuay culture has been found at Aija. In fact, Recuay style stone carvings are known as Aija.
