= Santiago Antúnez de Mayolo =

Peruvian engineer, physicist and mathematician (1887–1967)

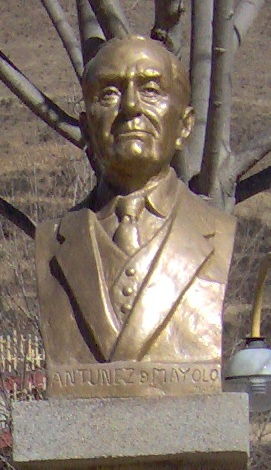
Monument at Parque Ecológico Infantil Chalampampa

Santiago Antúnez de Mayolo was born on 10 January 1887 in the country estate of Vista Bella, province of Aija, Peru, department of Áncash. He was an engineer, physicist and mathematician.

== Early years ==
He studied at Colegio Nacional de la Libertad (Huaraz) and later the College of Our Lady of Guadalupe (Lima), where he met Peruvian writer Abraham Valdelomar. In 1905 he was admitted into the Mathematical Sciences faculty of the San Marcos National University in Lima. At the end of the 1906 academic year (24 December), he received a distinction from President José Pardo, receiving a gold medal. After this, he traveled to France to get his degree in Electrical Engineering in the University of Grenoble. After that he took further studies at Columbia University. In 1912 he returned to Peru, where he worked as a professor at San Marcos University. After this he traveled around Peru, searching for suitable places to construct hydro-electric central power stations.

In the Third Pan-American Scientific Congress held in Lima, Antúnez de Mayolo presented the work "Hipótesis sobre la constitución de la materia," proposing the existence of a "neutral element" in the atom. Eight years later, Englishman James Chadwick confirmed this theory. In 1934, he proposed the existence of the positron in his article "Los tres elementos constitutivos de la materia." In 1936, David Anderson received the Nobel prize for its discovery.
