= Coris District =

Coordinates: 9°49′59″S 77°45′00″W

Coris
- District
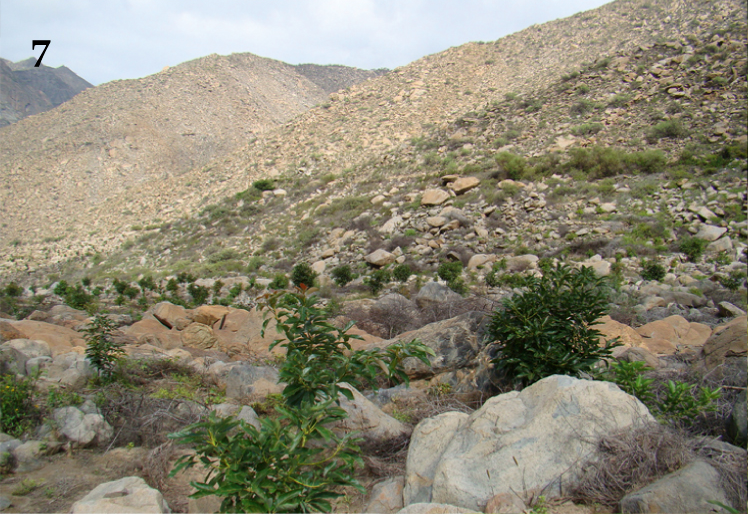
- Scutalus mariopenai in the Coris District
- Interactive map of Coris
- Country: Peru
- Region: Ancash
- Province: Aija
- Founded: February 10, 1922
- Capital: Coris

Government
  - Mayor: Mamerto Antonio Chavez Quiñones (2007)

Area
  - Total: 267.15 km^{2} (103.15 sq mi)
- Elevation: 2,890 m (9,480 ft)

Population (2017)
  - Total: 1,639
  - Density: 6.135/km^{2} (15.89/sq mi)
- Time zone: UTC-5 (PET)
- UBIGEO: 020202

Coris District is one of 5 districts in the Aija Province, of the Ancash Region in Peru. Its population was 1639 as of the 2017 census.
