= Puca Allpa =

Mountain in Peru

- Location within Peru

Highest point
- Elevation: 4,800 m (15,700 ft)
- Coordinates: 9°45′51″S 77°31′46″W

Geography
- Location: Peru, Ancash Region
- Parent range: Andes, Cordillera Negra

Puca Allpa or Puka Allpa (Quechua puka red, allpa earth, "red earth", Hispanicized spelling Puca Allpa) is a mountain in the Cordillera Negra in the Andes of Peru, about 4,800 m (15,700 ft) high. It is situated in the Ancash Region, Aija Province, Aija District, and in the Recuay Province, on the border of the districts of Recuay and Ticapampa. Puca Allpa lies between Wank'ap'iti in the southeast and Pucairca in the northwest.
