= Aija province =

Coordinates: 9.781887°S 77.610856°W

Aija
- Province
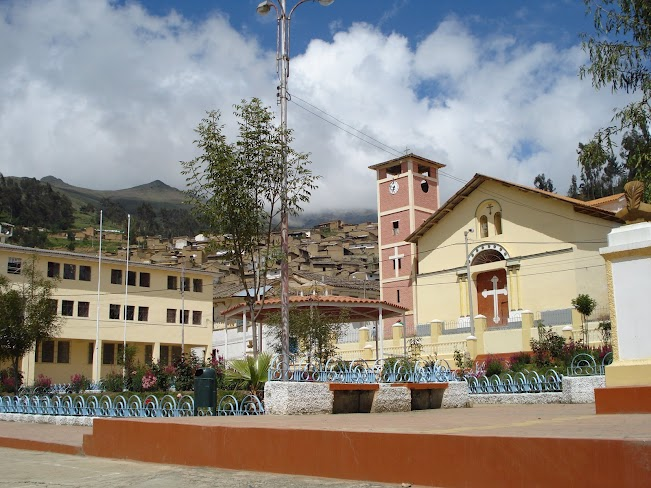
- Aija, the capital of the province

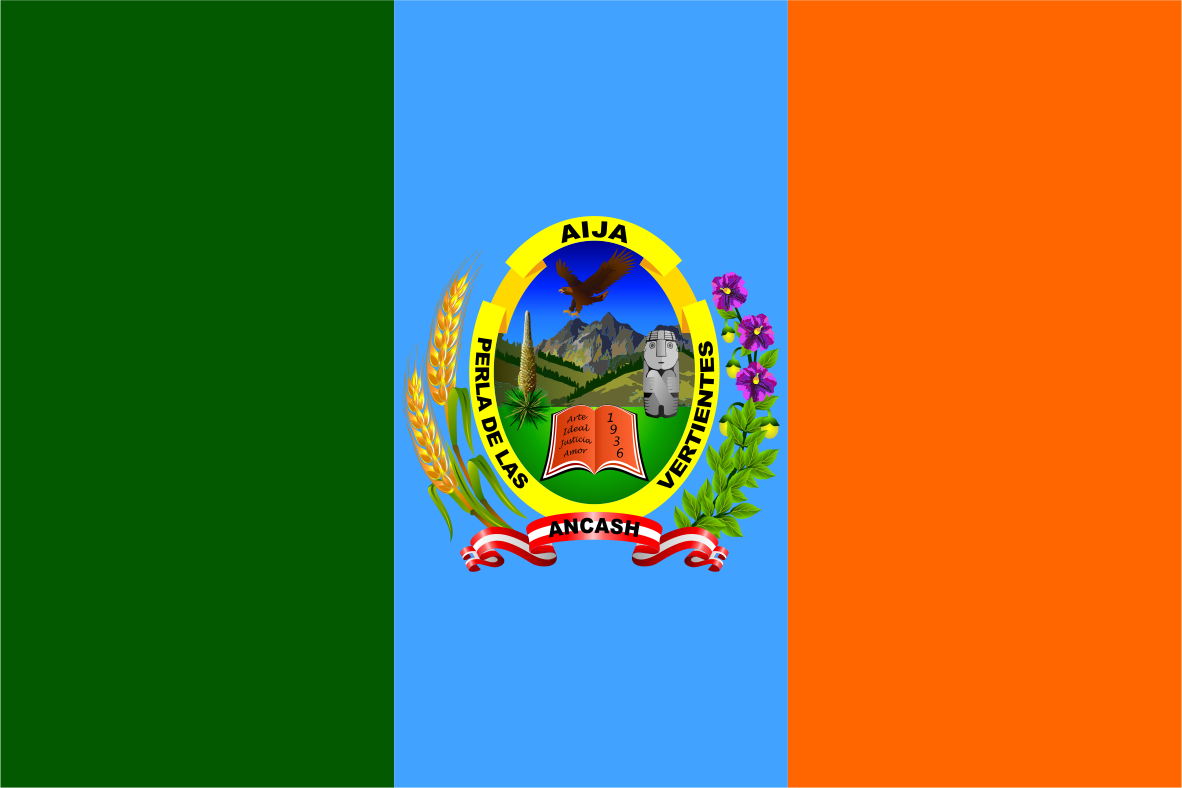
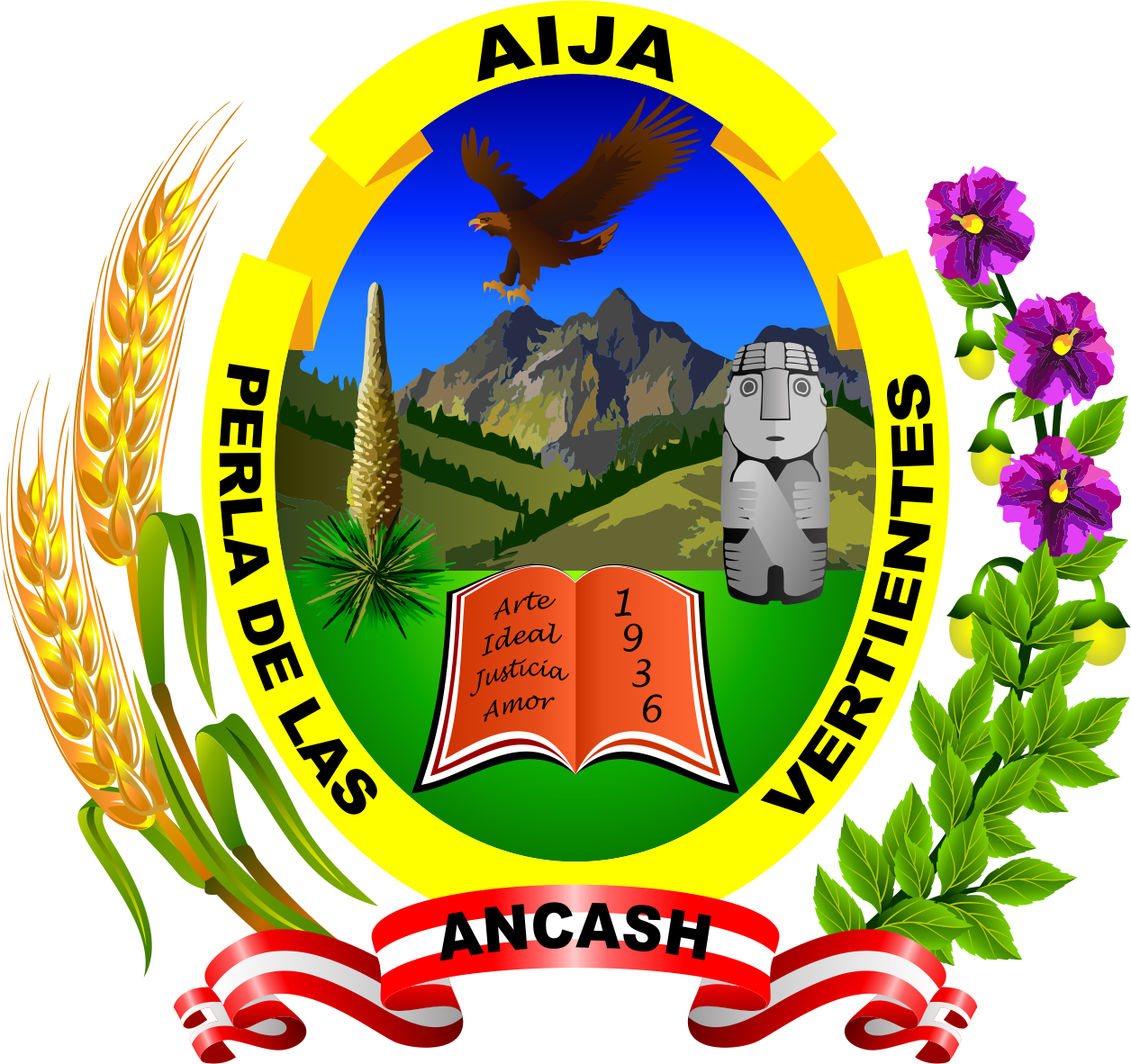
- Flag Coat of arms

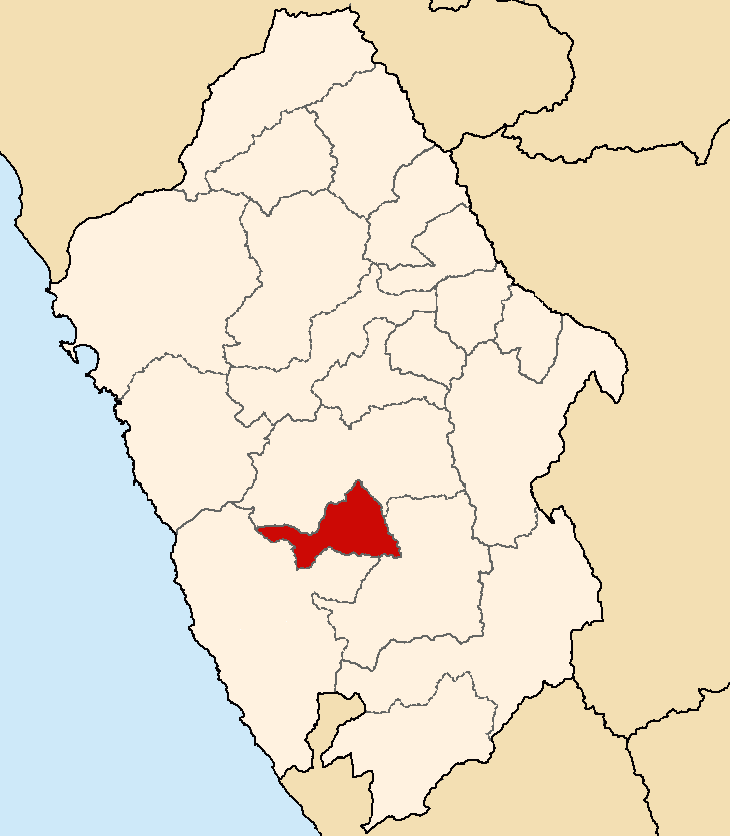
- Location of Aija in the Ancash Region
- Country: Peru
- Region: Ancash
- Capital: Aija

Government
  - Mayor: Pedro Moisés Toque Ita (2019-2022)

Area
  - Total: 696.72 km^{2} (269.01 sq mi)

Population
  - Total: 6,136
  - Density: 8.807/km^{2} (22.81/sq mi)

Aija is one of 20 provinces of the Ancash Region in Peru.

== Geography ==
The Cordillera Negra traverses the province. Some of the highest mountains of the province are listed below:

- Aqu Kancha
- Chaka Wayin
- Kiswar Punta
- Kunkush
- Kuntur Pukyu
- Lima Hirka
- Mullu Wank'a
- Parya
- Pillaka
- Puka Allpa
- Puka Hirka
- Puma Puñunan
- Puma Wayin
- P'allqa
- Qishqi Punta
- Sach'a Hirka
- Tarush Qhawana
- Wank'ap'iti
- Wank'ayuq Hirka
- Wik'uña Qaqa
- Wishka
- Yana Kunkush
- Yana Mach'ay
- Yana Mina
- Yanaqucha
- Yuraq Yaku

== Political division ==
Aija is divided into five districts, which are:

District	Mayor
Aija	German Ignacio Hizo Requena
Coris	Mamerto Antonio Chavez Quiñones
Huacllan	Wenceslao Lorenzo Hidalgo Gomero
La Merced	Manuel Dario Manrique Mejia
Succha	Aquiles Florencio Ortiz Leon

== Ethnic groups ==
The province is inhabited by indigenous citizens of Quechua descent. Spanish is the language which the majority of the population (62.10%) learnt to speak in childhood, while 37.70% of the residents started speaking using the Quechua language (2007 Peru Census).
