= Qarwaqucha (Ancash) =

Mountain in Peru

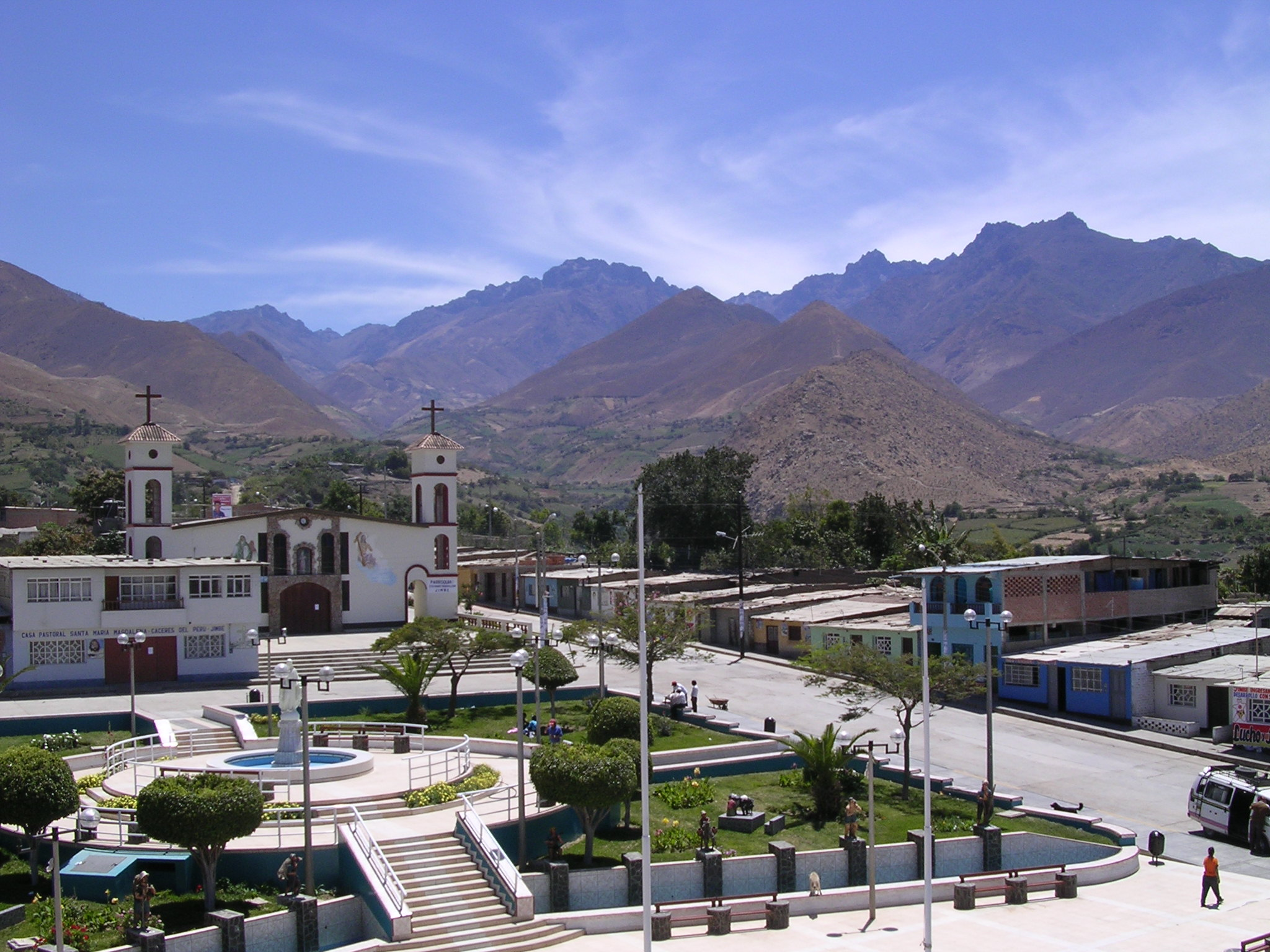
- Qarwaqucha as seen from Jimbe

Highest point
- Elevation: 5,070 m (16,630 ft)
- Coordinates: 8°57′17.8″S 77°58′0.1″W

Geography
- Location within Peru
- Location: Peru, Ancash Region
- Parent range: Andes, Cordillera Negra

Qarwaqucha (Quechua qarwa yellowish, qucha lake, "yellowish lake", also spelled Carhuacocha), also known as Qarwa Punta (Quechua for "yellowish peak (or ridge)", also spelled Carhuapunta) or Flery Punta, is a mountain in the Cordillera Negra in the Andes of Peru. It is located in the Ancash Region, Santa Province, Cáceres del Perú District, near a little lake of that name. It reaches a height of 5,070 m (16,634 ft).

The lake named Qarwaqucha lies southeast of the peak at 8°57′35″S 77°57′26″W.

== See also ==
- List of mountains in the Andes
