= Coñocranra =

Mountain in Peru

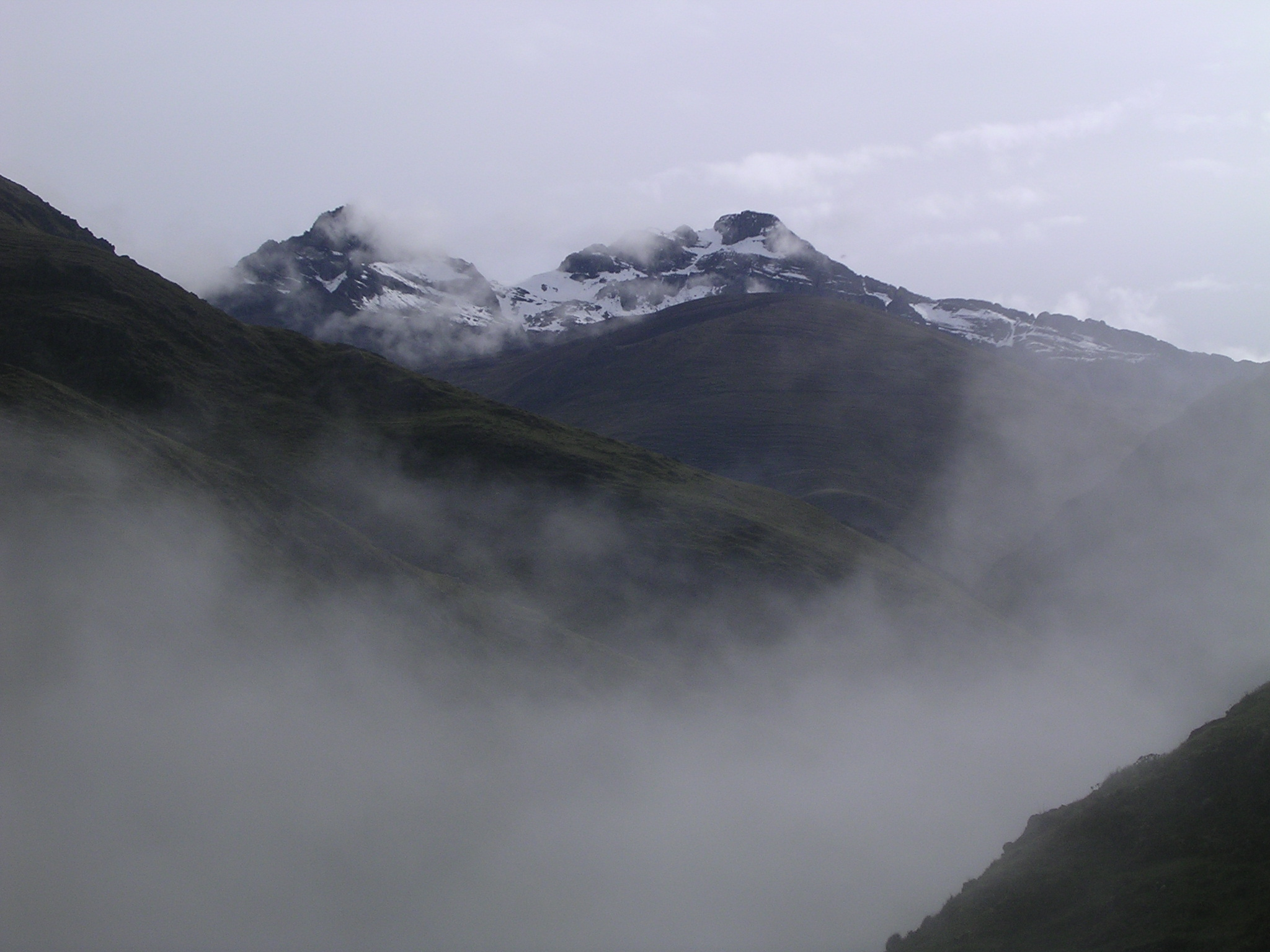

Highest point
- Elevation: 5,181 m (16,998 ft)
- Prominence: 1,085 m (3,560 ft)
- Coordinates: 8°50′35″S 78°00′23″W

Geography
- Location within Peru
- Location: Ancash Region, Peru
- Parent range: Andes

Geology
- Mountain type: Stratovolcano

Coñocranra (possibly from Quechua quñuq warm, lukewarm, ranra stony, stony place) is a mountain of Peru located in the Ancash Region, Santa Province. It is the highest mountain in the Cordillera Negra at (5181 m).

From its summit is the scenery of the Andes mountain range around. To the west, is the profile of the coast, usually in a misty background. To the east, is the Cordillera Blanca where the highest peaks of Peru can be seen, especially Huascarán (6768 m). Between the two mountain ranges, runs the Santa River, which gives life to the Callejón de Huaylas. Then the two mountain ranges come close to giving birth to the Canyon del Pato. Finally the Santa River, after cutting the Cordillera Negra, flows into the Pacific Ocean.
