= Cordillera Negra =

Mountain range in the Andes of Peru

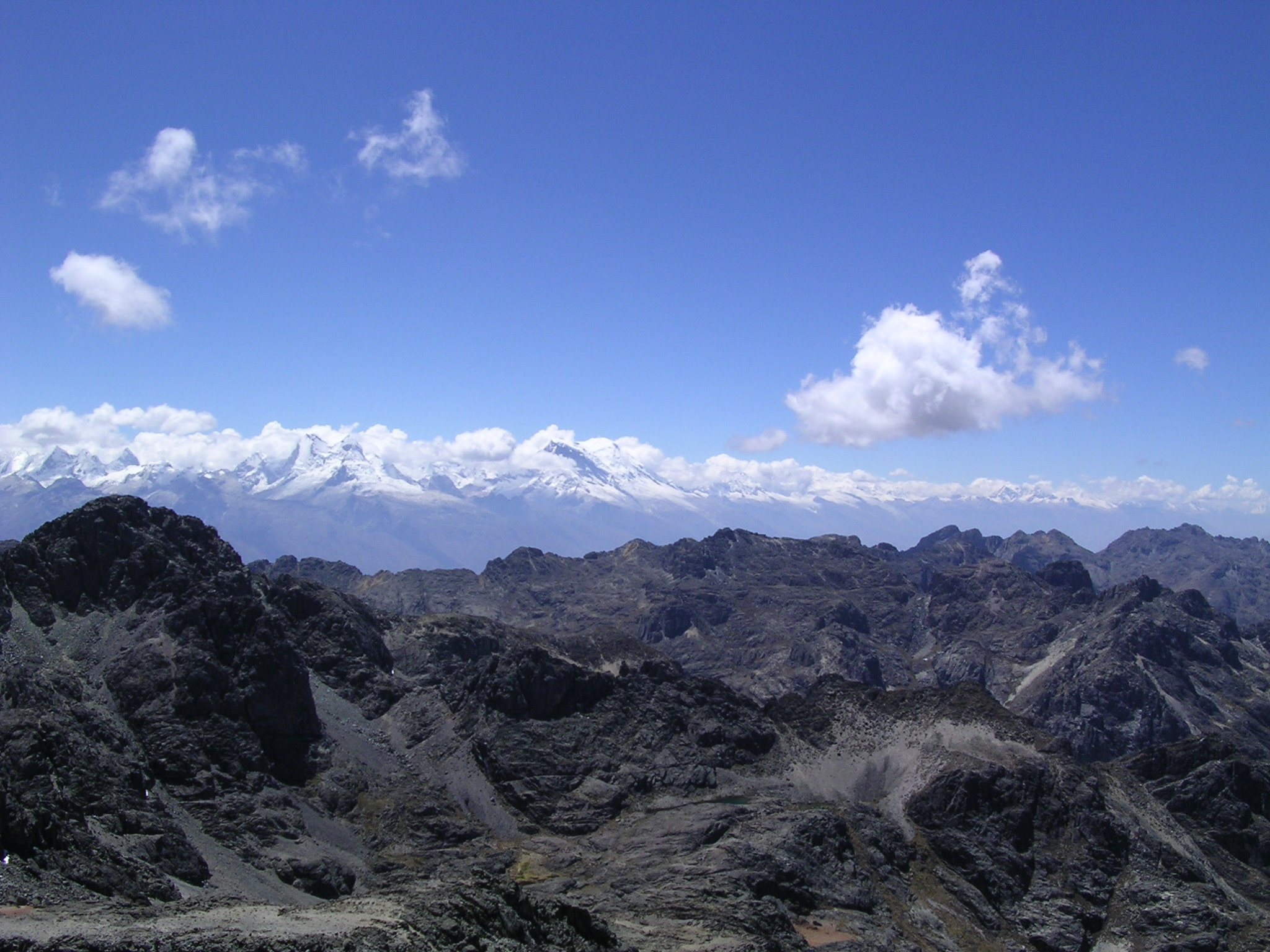
- Part of the Cordillera Negra with the Cordillera Blanca in the background as seen from Qarwaqucha

Highest point
- Peak: Quñuqranra
- Elevation: 5,181 m (16,998 ft)

Dimensions
- Length: 230 km (140 mi) NNW-SSE
- Width: 25–40 km (16–25 mi)

Geography
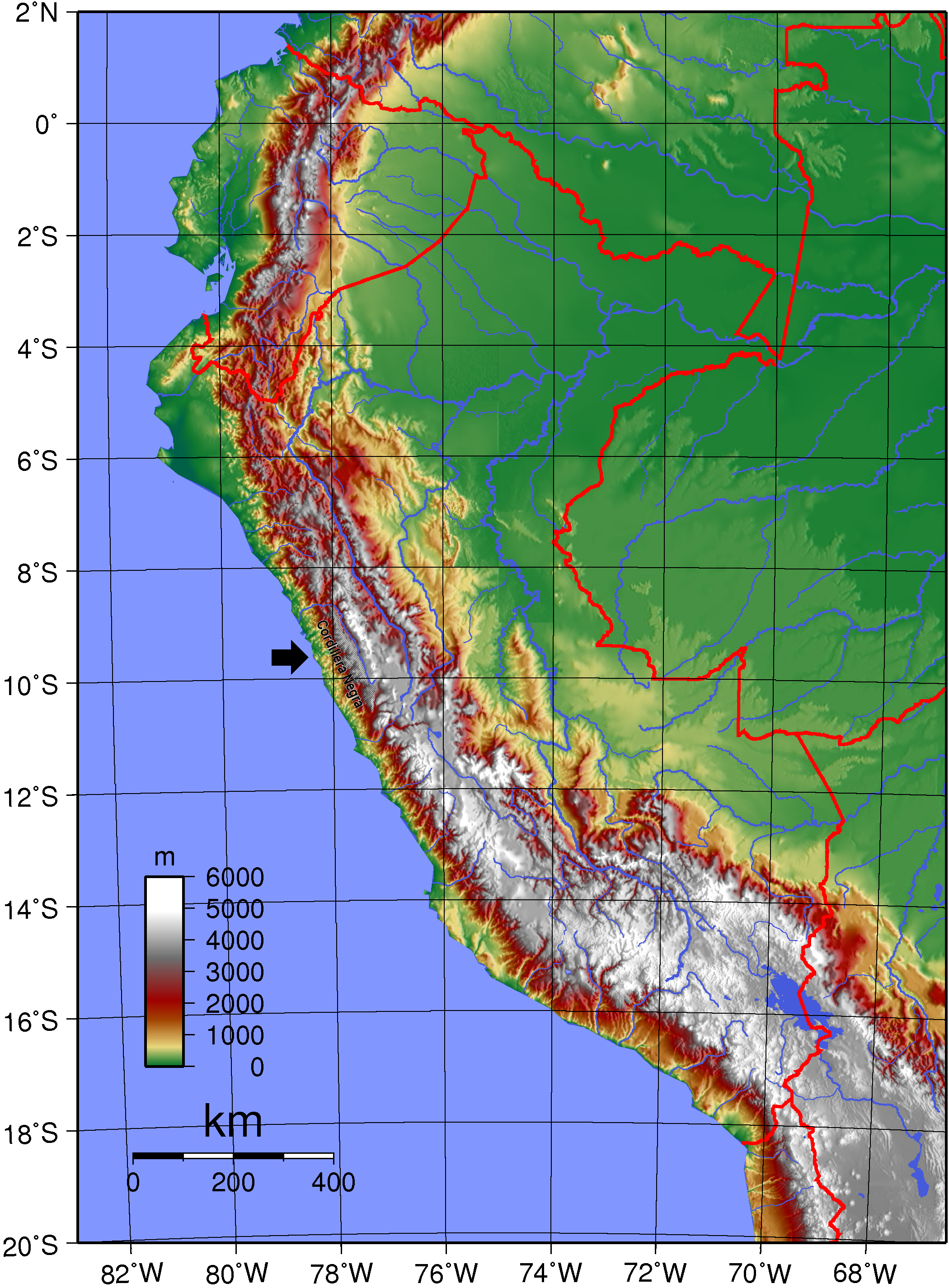
- Cordillera Negra
- Country: Peru
- Region: Ancash Region
- Parent range: Cordillera Occidental (Peru) in the Andes

The Cordillera Negra (Spanish for "black range"), Yana Walla in qechua is part of the Cordillera Occidental, one of three mountain ranges in the Andes of west central Peru. It is almost entirely located within the Ancash Region.

The range extends over an area about 230 km long and 25–40 km wide, stretching in a NNW-SSE direction parallel to the Pacific coast, its ridge is about 60 km from the coastline. It is part of the Andes mountain range which inland borders on the Costa, the narrow strip of coastal deserts along the South American coast. In the north and east the range is bordered by the Santa River which crosses the coastal ridge at 8° 45' S and runs parallel to the Cordillera Negra for almost all its length. In the south the range is bordered by the Patiwillka River at 10° 30'. In the central part of the range near Huaráz, Casma River breaks through the ridge of the range.

The Cordillera Negra has rocky peaks with very little winter snowfall. The gullies of the Cordillera Negra are gloomy and dark. Most of them are dry or their flow is scarce.

The Santa River separates the Cordillera Negra from the Cordillera Blanca, a snow-covered range rising up to 6,768 m in the east almost parallel to it. Most of the year it has no snow although it rises up to 5,181 m in its highest parts. It intercepts the warmth from the Pacific Ocean, causing the line of perpetual snow sinking as low as 5,100 m in the Cordillera Blanca.

Today the Cordillera Negra is sparsely inhabited by a mainly indigenous population growing wheat, maize and oats at an elevation of well above 4,000 m. The range is rich in mineral resources like gold, silver and copper.

== Mountains ==
The highest mountain in the range is Quñuqranra at 5,181 metres (16,998 ft). Other mountains are listed below:

- Kankawa, 5,102 metres (16,739 ft)
- Qarwaqucha, 5,070 metres (16,634 ft)
- Rumi Cruz, 5,020 metres (16,470 ft)
- Cerro Rico, 5,006 metres (16,424 ft)
- Akapa Ranin, 5,000 metres (16,404 ft)
- Kushuru, 5,000 metres (16,404 ft)
- Q'iruqucha, 5,000 metres (16,404 ft)
- Wank'ap'iti, 4,976 metres (16,325 ft)
- Puka Hirka, 4,870 metres (15,978 ft)
- Chunta, 4,810 metres (15,781 ft)
- Ichik Wiri, 4,800 metres (15,748 ft)
- Kankawa Punta, 4,800 metres (15,748 ft)
- Kushuru Punta, 4,800 metres (15,748 ft)
- Mashma Chaka, 4,800 metres (15,748 ft)
- Mata Mata, 4,800 metres (15,748 ft)
- Millishqucha, 4,800 metres (15,748 ft)
- Millpuq, 4,800 metres (15,748 ft)
- Parya, 4,800 metres (15,748 ft)
- Pillaka, 4,800 metres (15,748 ft)
- Puka Allpa, 4,800 metres (15,748 ft)
- Puka Punta, 4,800 metres (15,748 ft)
- Shinwaqucha, 4,800 metres (15,748 ft)
- Simiyuq Wank'a, 4,800 metres (15,748 ft)
- Yana Yaku, 4,800 metres (15,748 ft)
- Wanaku, 4,800 metres (15,748 ft)
- Yana Mach'ay, 4,800 metres (15,748 ft)
- Yuraq Punta, 4,800 metres (15,748 ft)
- Puka Qaqa, 4,640 metres (15,223 ft)
- Chunta Punta, 4,600 metres (15,092 ft)
- Kima Tullpa, 4,600 metres (15,092 ft)
- Kiswar, 4,600 metres (15,092 ft)
- Kunkush, 4,600 metres (15,092 ft)
- Kunkush Kancha, 4,600 metres (15,092 ft)
- Kuntur Qaqa, 4,600 metres (15,092 ft)
- Kushuru Hirka, 4,600 metres (15,092 ft)
- Lima Hirka, 4,600 metres (15,092 ft)
- Minas Hirka, 4,600 metres (15,092 ft)
- Parya, 4,600 metres (15,092 ft)
- Puka Hirka, 4,600 metres (15,092 ft)
- Puka Ranra, 4,600 metres (15,092 ft)
- Pukaqucha, 4,600 metres (15,092 ft)
- Puma Puñunan, 4,600 metres (15,092 ft)
- Phiruru Punta, 4,600 metres (15,092 ft)
- Qaqa Rumi Kunka, 4,600 metres (15,092 ft)
- Qulluta, 4,600 metres (15,092 ft)
- Sach'a Hirka, 4,600 metres (15,092 ft)
- Simiyuq Wank'a, 4,600 metres (15,092 ft)
- Ututu Hirka, 4,600 metres (15,092 ft)
- Wallpaq Sillu Punta, 4,600 metres (15,092 ft)
- Wishka, 4,600 metres (15,092 ft)
- Yana Kunkush, 4,600 metres (15,092 ft)
- Yana Mach'ay, 4,600 metres (15,092 ft)
- Yanaqucha, 4,600 metres (15,092 ft)
- Hatun Kunka, 4,400 metres (14,436 ft)
- Isku Pata, 4,400 metres (14,436 ft)
- Puma Wayin, 4,400 metres (14,436 ft)
- Qullpa Hirka, 4,200 metres (13,780 ft)
- Tarush Qhawana, 4,400 metres (14,436 ft)
- T'uquyuq, 4,400 metres (14,436 ft)
- Wamp'u, 4,400 metres (14,436 ft)
- Yuraq Yaku, 4,400 metres (14,436 ft)
- Kuntur Wayin, 4,200 metres (13,780 ft)
- Putaqa, 4,200 metres (13,780 ft)
- Llaksa Hirka, 4,000 metres (13,123 ft)
- Wamp'u, 4,000 metres (13,123 ft)
- Hatun Hirka, 3,400 metres (11,155 ft)

The highest pass road of the Cordillera Negra is the Wank'ap'iti pass at 4,680 m above sea level.

== Routes ==
The route Casma-Huaraz is not a very highly travelled road. The highway begins with a paved path that arrives up to Yaután. Then it quickly begins to ascend through an unpaved path by the sides of the Cordillera Negra, following the course of the Casma River. This route becomes more steep once it arrives to Pariacoto. Along the road, there are not important towns at all, except for Pira that offers some traveler's services.

This route, extremely steep and narrow, goes between big abysses and gullies. It can be seen small rural districts with chakras (smallholdings) that have been sown with potatoes, wheat, barley and other food products. It can also be seen livestock and a lot of human activity.

== Guitarrero Cave ==
In the 1960s, the Guitarrero Cave was discovered on the northern edges of Cordillera Negra, a cave containing bones of mastodon and llama and suggesting human occupation as far back as 10,950 to 10,230 BC.
