= Provinces of Peru =

Second level administrative subdivision of Peru

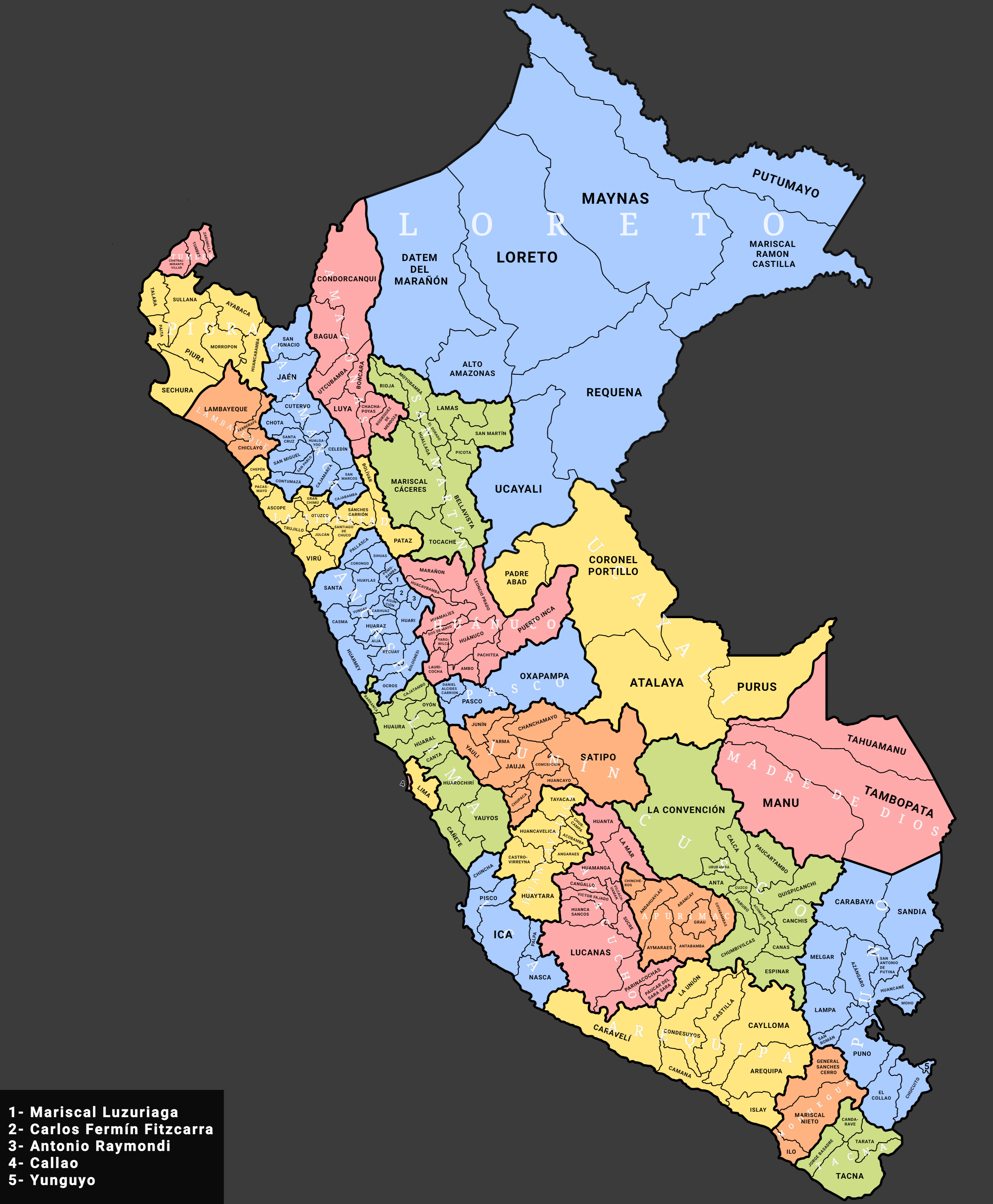
Map of Peruvian provinces

The provinces of Peru (Spanish: provincias) are the second-level administrative subdivisions of the country. They are divided into districts (Spanish: distritos). There are 196 provinces in Peru, grouped into 24 departments (or regions), while two provinces—Lima and Callao—are subject to a special regime, with the latter not belonging to any department. This makes an average of seven provinces per department. The department with the fewest provinces is the Constitutional Province of Callao (one province equal in status to a department) and the one with the most is Ancash (twenty).

While provinces in the sparsely populated Amazon rainforest of eastern Peru tend to be larger, there is a large concentration of them in the north-central area of the country. The province with the fewest districts is Purús Province, with just one district. The province with the most districts is Lima Province, with 43 districts. The most common number of districts per province is eight; a total of 29 provinces share this number of districts.

== History ==
The current provincial system dates back to the 1823 constitution, which replaced the partidos of the former Viceroyalty of Peru. In 1824, seven departments were created, divided into 56 provinces in total.

Until the 20th century, a number of provinces were granted the designation of littoral province (Spanish: provincia litoral), an autonomous regime equal in status to a department. The most notable example is that of Callao, which operated under this regime from 1836 to 1857, when this status was changed to a constitutional province (Spanish: provincia constitucional), a designation with no practical difference, on April 22 of that year.

According to the 2002 law for the decentralisation of the country, there are two provinces under a special regime (Spanish: régimen especial): Lima and Callao. The latter does not belong to any department since 1836.

Prior to the aformentioned law, provinces were administered by a sub-prefect (sub-prefecto). From 1836 to 1856, when a new constitution was passed, Peru's littoral provinces—autonomous provinces equal in status to a department—were administered by governors (gobernador), different in name only to the departments' prefects, as both offices were identical.

As of 2025, Peru has 196 provinces in total. The latest to be created is that of Putumayo, on April 10, 2014.

== List of provinces ==
The table below shows all provinces with their capitals and the department in which they are located. The UBIGEO code uniquely identifies each province. Capitals in bold are also a departmental capital. Provinces in which the department's capital is located all have an UBIGEO code ending in 01.

Province	Department	Capital	Districts	UBIGEO
Chachapoyas	Amazonas	**Chachapoyas**	21	0101
Bagua	Amazonas	Bagua	6	0102
Bongará	Amazonas	Jumbilla	12	0103
Condorcanqui	Amazonas	Santa María de Nieva	3	0104
Luya	Amazonas	Lámud	23	0105
Rodríguez de Mendoza	Amazonas	Mendoza	12	0106
Utcubamba	Amazonas	Bagua Grande	7	0107
Huaraz	Ancash	**Huaraz**	12	0201
Aija	Ancash	Aija	5	0202
Antonio Raymondi	Ancash	Llamellín	6	0203
Asunción	Ancash	Chacas	2	0204
Bolognesi	Ancash	Chiquián	15	0205
Carhuaz	Ancash	Carhuaz	11	0206
Carlos Fermín Fitzcarrald	Ancash	San Luis	3	0207
Casma	Ancash	Casma	4	0208
Corongo	Ancash	Corongo	7	0209
Huari	Ancash	Huari	16	0210
Huarmey	Ancash	Huarmey	5	0211
Huaylas	Ancash	Caraz	10	0212
Mariscal Luzuriaga	Ancash	Piscobamba	8	0213
Ocros	Ancash	Ocros	10	0214
Pallasca	Ancash	Cabana	11	0215
Pomabamba	Ancash	Pomabamba	4	0216
Recuay	Ancash	Recuay	10	0217
Santa	Ancash	Chimbote	9	0218
Sihuas	Ancash	Sihuas	10	0219
Yungay	Ancash	Yungay	8	0220
Abancay	Apurímac	**Abancay**	9	0301
Andahuaylas	Apurímac	Andahuaylas	19	0302
Antabamba	Apurímac	Antabamba	7	0303
Aymaraes	Apurímac	Chalhuanca	17	0304
Cotabambas	Apurímac	Tambobamba	6	0305
Chincheros	Apurímac	Chincheros	8	0306
Grau	Apurímac	Chuquibambilla	14	0307
Arequipa	Arequipa	**Arequipa**	29	0401
Camaná	Arequipa	Camaná	8	0402
Caravelí	Arequipa	Caravelí	13	0403
Castilla	Arequipa	Aplao	14	0404
Caylloma	Arequipa	Chivay	19	0405
Condesuyos	Arequipa	Chuquibamba	8	0406
Islay	Arequipa	Mollendo	6	0407
La Unión	Arequipa	Cotahuasi	11	0408
Huamanga	Ayacucho	**Ayacucho**	15	0501
Cangallo	Ayacucho	Cangallo	6	0502
Huanca Sancos	Ayacucho	Huanca Sancos	4	0503
Huanta	Ayacucho	Huanta	8	0504
La Mar	Ayacucho	San Miguel	8	0505
Lucanas	Ayacucho	Puquio	21	0506
Parinacochas	Ayacucho	Coracora	8	0507
Páucar del Sara Sara	Ayacucho	Pausa	10	0508
Sucre	Ayacucho	Querobamba	11	0509
Víctor Fajardo	Ayacucho	Huancapi	12	0510
Vilcas Huamán	Ayacucho	Vilcashuamán	8	0511
Cajamarca	Cajamarca	**Cajamarca**	12	0601
Cajabamba	Cajamarca	Cajabamba	4	0602
Celendín	Cajamarca	Celendín	12	0603
Chota	Cajamarca	Chota	19	0604
Contumazá	Cajamarca	Contumazá	8	0605
Cutervo	Cajamarca	Cutervo	15	0606
Hualgayoc	Cajamarca	Bambamarca	3	0607
Jaén	Cajamarca	Jaén	12	0608
San Ignacio	Cajamarca	San Ignacio	7	0609
San Marcos	Cajamarca	San Marcos	7	0610
San Miguel	Cajamarca	San Miguel de Pallaques	13	0611
San Pablo	Cajamarca	San Pablo	4	0612
Santa Cruz	Cajamarca	Santa Cruz de Succhubamba	11	0613
Callao	None	**Callao**	7	0701
Cusco	Cusco	**Cusco**	8	0801
Acomayo	Cusco	Acomayo	7	0802
Anta	Cusco	Anta	9	0803
Calca	Cusco	Calca	8	0804
Canas	Cusco	Yanaoca	8	0805
Canchis	Cusco	Sicuani	8	0806
Chumbivilcas	Cusco	Santo Tomás	8	0807
Espinar	Cusco	Yauri	8	0808
La Convención	Cusco	Quillabamba	10	0809
Paruro	Cusco	Paruro	9	0810
Paucartambo	Cusco	Paucartambo	6	0811
Quispicanchi	Cusco	Urcos	12	0812
Urubamba	Cusco	Urubamba	7	0813
Huancavelica	Huancavelica	**Huancavelica**	19	0901
Acobamba	Huancavelica	Acobamba	8	0902
Angaraes	Huancavelica	Lircay	12	0903
Castrovirreyna	Huancavelica	Castrovirreyna	13	0904
Churcampa	Huancavelica	Churcampa	10	0905
Huaytará	Huancavelica	Huaytará	16	0906
Tayacaja	Huancavelica	Pampas	16	0907
Huánuco	Huánuco	**Huánuco**	11	1001
Ambo	Huánuco	Ambo	8	1002
Dos de Mayo	Huánuco	La Unión	9	1003
Huacaybamba	Huánuco	Huacaybamba	4	1004
Huamalíes	Huánuco	Llata	11	1005
Leoncio Prado	Huánuco	Tingo María	6	1006
Marañón	Huánuco	Huacrachuco	3	1007
Pachitea	Huánuco	Panao	4	1008
Puerto Inca	Huánuco	Puerto Inca	5	1009
Lauricocha	Huánuco	Jesús	7	1010
Yarowilca	Huánuco	Chavinillo	8	1011
Ica	Ica	**Ica**	14	1101
Chincha	Ica	Chincha Alta	11	1102
Nazca	Ica	Nazca	5	1103
Palpa	Ica	Palpa	5	1104
Pisco	Ica	Pisco	8	1105
Huancayo	Junín	**Huancayo**	28	1201
Concepción	Junín	Concepción	15	1202
Chanchamayo	Junín	La Merced	6	1203
Jauja	Junín	Jauja	34	1204
Junín	Junín	Junín	4	1205
Satipo	Junín	Satipo	8	1206
Tarma	Junín	Tarma	9	1207
Yauli	Junín	La Oroya	10	1208
Chupaca	Junín	Chupaca	9	1209
Trujillo	La Libertad	**Trujillo**	11	1301
Ascope	La Libertad	Ascope	8	1302
Bolívar	La Libertad	Bolívar	6	1303
Chepén	La Libertad	Chepén	3	1304
Julcán	La Libertad	Julcán	4	1305
Otuzco	La Libertad	Otuzco	10	1306
Pacasmayo	La Libertad	San Pedro de Lloc	5	1307
Pataz	La Libertad	Tayabamba	13	1308
Sánchez Carrión	La Libertad	Huamachuco	8	1309
Santiago de Chuco	La Libertad	Santiago de Chuco	8	1310
Gran Chimú	La Libertad	Cascas	4	1311
Virú	La Libertad	Virú	3	1312
Chiclayo	Lambayeque	**Chiclayo**	20	1401
Ferreñafe	Lambayeque	Ferreñafe	6	1402
Lambayeque	Lambayeque	Lambayeque	12	1403
Huaura	Lima	**Huacho** (Note: Seat of the regional government.)	12	1508
Barranca	Lima	Barranca	5	1502
Cajatambo	Lima	Cajatambo	5	1503
Canta	Lima	Canta	7	1504
Cañete	Lima	San Vicente de Cañete	16	1505
Huaral	Lima	Huaral	12	1506
Huarochirí	Lima	Matucana	32	1507
Lima	Lima	**Lima** (Note: Under a special regime.)	43	1501
Oyón	Lima	Oyón	6	1509
Yauyos	Lima	Yauyos	33	1510
Maynas	Loreto	**Iquitos**	13	1601
Alto Amazonas	Loreto	Yurimaguas	6	1602
Loreto	Loreto	Nauta	5	1603
Mariscal Ramón Castilla	Loreto	Caballococha	4	1604
Putumayo	Loreto	San Antonio del Estrecho	4	1605
Requena	Loreto	Requena	11	1606
Ucayali	Loreto	Contamana	6	1607
Datem del Marañón	Loreto	San Lorenzo	6	1608
Tambopata	Madre de Dios	**Puerto Maldonado**	4	1701
Manú	Madre de Dios	Salvación	4	1702
Tahuamanu	Madre de Dios	Iñapari	3	1703
Mariscal Nieto	Moquegua	**Moquegua**	6	1801
General Sánchez Cerro	Moquegua	Omate	11	1802
Ilo	Moquegua	Ilo	3	1803
Pasco	Pasco	**Cerro de Pasco**	13	1901
Daniel Alcídes Carrión	Pasco	Yanahuanca	8	1902
Oxapampa	Pasco	Oxapampa	7	1903
Piura	Piura	**Piura**	9	2001
Ayabaca	Piura	Ayabaca	10	2002
Huancabamba	Piura	Huancabamba	8	2003
Morropón	Piura	Chulucanas	10	2004
Paita	Piura	Paita	7	2005
Sullana	Piura	Sullana	8	2006
Talara	Piura	Talara	6	2007
Sechura	Piura	Sechura	6	2008
Puno	Puno	**Puno**	15	2101
Azángaro	Puno	Azángaro	15	2102
Carabaya	Puno	Macusani	10	2103
Chucuito	Puno	Juli	7	2104
El Collao	Puno	Ilave	5	2105
Huancané	Puno	Huancané	8	2106
Lampa	Puno	Lampa	10	2107
Melgar	Puno	Ayaviri	9	2108
Moho	Puno	Moho	4	2109
San Antonio de Putina	Puno	Putina	5	2110
San Román	Puno	Juliaca	4	2111
Sandia	Puno	Sandia	10	2112
Yunguyo	Puno	Yunguyo	7	2113
Moyobamba	San Martín	**Moyobamba**	6	2201
Bellavista	San Martín	Bellavista	6	2202
El Dorado	San Martín	San José de Sisa	5	2203
Huallaga	San Martín	Saposoa	6	2204
Lamas	San Martín	Lamas	11	2205
Mariscal Cáceres	San Martín	Juanjuí	5	2206
Picota	San Martín	Picota	10	2207
Rioja	San Martín	Rioja	9	2208
San Martín	San Martín	Tarapoto	14	2209
Tocache	San Martín	Tocache	5	2210
Tacna	Tacna	**Tacna**	10	2301
Candarave	Tacna	Candarave	6	2302
Jorge Basadre	Tacna	Locumba	3	2303
Tarata	Tacna	Tarata	8	2304
Tumbes	Tumbes	**Tumbes**	6	2401
Contralmirante Villar	Tumbes	Zorritos	3	2402
Zarumilla	Tumbes	Zarumilla	4	2403
Coronel Portillo	Ucayali	**Pucallpa**	7	2501
Atalaya	Ucayali	Atalaya	4	2502
Padre Abad	Ucayali	Aguaytía	3	2503
Purús	Ucayali	Esperanza	1	2504

=== By population ===
Province	Population	Department	Name of City	Districts
Lima	7,605,742	Lima	Lima	43
Constitutional Province of Callao	876,877	None	Callao	6
Arequipa	864,250	Arequipa	Arequipa	29
Trujillo	811,979	La Libertad	Trujillo	11
Chiclayo	757,452	Lambayeque	Chiclayo	20
Piura	665,991	Piura	Piura	9
Maynas	492,992	Loreto	Iquitos	13
Huancayo	466,436	Junín	Huancayo	28
Santa	396,434	Ancash	Chimbote	9
Cusco	367,791	Cusco	Cusco	8
Coronel Portillo	333,890	Ucayali	Pucallpa	7
Ica	321,332	Ica	Ica	14
Cajamarca	316,152	Cajamarca	Cajamarca	12
Sullana	287,680	Piura	Sullana	8
Huánuco	270,233	Huánuco	Huánuco	11
Tacna	262,731	Tacna	Tacna	10
Lambayeque	258,747	Lambayeque	Lambayeque	12
San Román	240,776	Puno	Juliaca	4
Puno	229,236	Puno	Puno	15
Huamanga	221,469	Ayacucho	Ayacucho	15

=== Former provinces ===
Province	Capital city	Established	Disestablished	Fate
Arica	Arica	1823	1929	Incorporated into Chile
Callao (Note: Applies to period as a Littoral Province.)	Callao	1836	1857	Elevated to Constitutional Province
Chancay	Huacho	1821	1988	Dismembered
Conchucos	Piscobamba	1821	1861	Dismembered
Huánuco	Huánuco	1867	1869	Elevated to department
Ica	Ica	1855	1563	Elevated to department
Iquique	Iquique	1878	1883	Incorporated into Chile
Loreto	Moyobamba	1853	1866	Elevated to department
Moquegua	Moquegua	1823	1936	Reorganised
Tumbes	Tumbes	1901	1942	Elevated to department
Tinta	Tinta	1825	1833	Dismembered
Tarapacá	Tarapacá	1837	1883	Incorporated into Chile (Note: Created as part of the Peru–Bolivian Confederation. Following its dissolution, it was elevated to a littoral province in 1868. Its successor department, which also included a province of the same name, would be incorporated into Chile in 1883 following the War of the Pacific.)

== See also ==
- Administrative divisions of Peru
- Regions of Peru
- Districts of Peru
- Municipalities of Peru
