= Pampas Grande =

Pampas Grande San Jerónimo de Pampas
- Village
- Pampas Grande
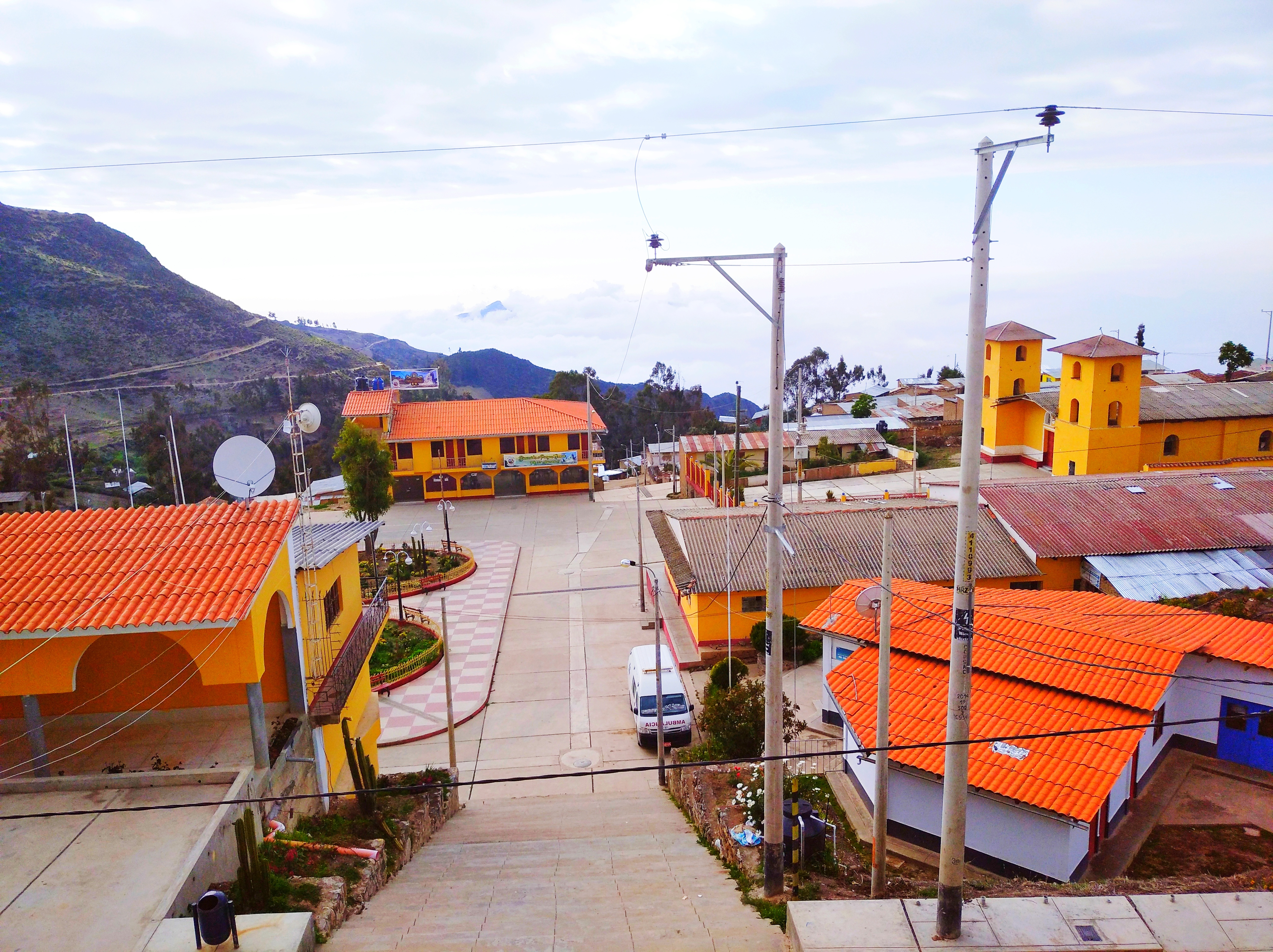
- Motto: Spanish: Balcón Suspendido entre el Mar y el Cielo (Balcony Suspended between Sea and Sky)
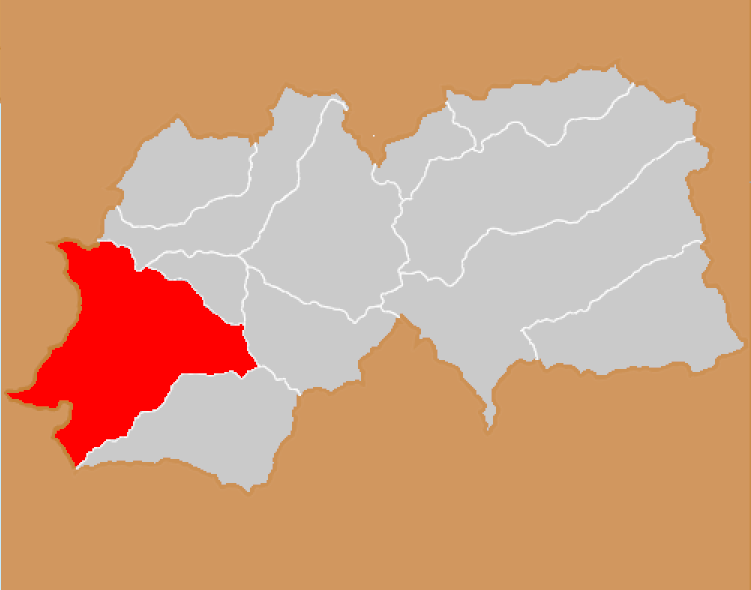
- Location within Huaraz Province

- Location within Peru
- Coordinates: 9°39′12.9″S 77°49′35.7″W
- Country: Peru
- Region: Ancash
- Province: Huaraz
- Settled: circa 16th century
- Incorporated: March 25, 1857

Government
  - Mayor: Inocencio Nemecio Villafuerte Colonia (APP)

Area
  - Village: 339 km^{2} (131 sq mi)
  - Land: 35,781 km^{2} (13,815 sq mi)
- Elevation: 3,690 m (12,110 ft)

Population (2017)
  - Village: 1,044
  - Urban: 356
- Time zone: UTC−05:00
- Area code: 51

Pampas Grande, founded as San Jerónimo de Pampas, is a Peruvian town and capital of the Pampas Grande district, located in the central part of Callejón de Huaylas in the Ancash region, about 4 hours from Huaraz and 9 from Lima. It has an approximate population of 1044 inhabitants, located at an average altitude of 3690 meters. It has a cold climate with average temperatures of 17 °C in summer and 12 °C in winter.

Little is known about the history of Pampas Grande before the arrival of the Spanish colonizers. The Kajur archaeological site is one of the oldest human settlements in this part of the Cordillera Negra. The Cuchicoto archaeological site located near the Canchón summit shows the influence of the Recuay culture during the Early Intermediate period. The region was conquered by the Inca Empire between approximately 1430 and 1450, during the rule of the Inca Pachacútec.

The first reference to Pampas Grande by Spanish colonizers was in 1597, by the missionary Santo Toribio de Mogrovejo. In 1774, the parish of La Asunción de Huaylas was founded. The town of Pampas was established at that time, being made up of members of the ayllu Poma, west of the town of Cajamarquilla. By 1857, the district of Pampas was officially created, with the capital being Pampas. In 2009, a vote was held to change the name of the town from Pampas to Pampas Grande, and on March 15, 2012, the town was formally renamed Pampas Grande.

The main economy is based in agriculture and livestock basically. Tourism and mining, to a lesser extent, are also sources of economic income. Festivals and holidays include the Shancac Festival, the Virgen de Fátima Patronal Festival, the New Year's Party from January 1 to 4, Christmas, and the Patronal Festival in honor of Saint Jerome from September 29 to October 2. The traditional dances that stand out are negrazos and the pastorcillos.

== Geography ==
=== Location ===
The Pampas Grande district is located on the western slope of the Cordillera Negra. Its territory includes the Yunga, Quechua, Suni or Jalca and Puna elevational levels. Its altitude range ranges from 550m when close to the border with Casma up to 4600 meters above sea level. The city of Pampas is located in the Jalca region.

=== Terrain ===
The town is on a plateau with varying elevation, which rises from its lowest point in the populated center of Sensen at 550m., to 4600m. near Laguna Hurguacocha. The plateau is quite rugged, with an abundance of mountainous terrain, due to being in the Cordillera Negra fault. The fault has been sinking the entire Callejón de Huaylas area since the quaternary period (2588 million years ago) at the rate of 1mm / year.

=== Hydrography ===
Pampas Grande is framed on the left bank of the Casma River basin, being located in the upper part of the Quebrada Victoria sub-basin; very close to the watershed with the Culebras river basin, with altitudes ranging from 4,600 to 2,400 meters above sea level.

==== Pira River ====
Mainly formed by the sub-basin of the Pira river. Politically it is located in the Ancash department, Huaraz province and Pira district; It is located in the upper part of the basin at an average altitude of 3,850 meters above sea level. The main channel runs 22.91 km with a 9.72% slope from its sources in the Paria gorge at 4 395 m above sea level. until it joins the left bank with the Vado river at 2,168 meters above sea level, from the union of the Pira and Vado rivers the Chacchán river is born. Your tour begins in the Paria gorge, Yupanga and the Pira river. This basin occupies an area of 164.80 km2, represents 5.5% of the total area of the Casma river basin (2,990.70 km2), the average annual precipitation in the Pira river hydrographic unit varies from 450 to 800 mm.

==== Vado River ====
Politically it belongs to the districts of La Libertad and Colcabamba, Huaraz province of the Ancash department; It is located at an average altitude of 3,550 meters above sea level. The main channel runs 25,967 km. with a slope of 18.45% from its springs at 4640 m.a.s.l. in the Miquicocha lagoon until its union by the left bank of the Chacchán river at 1 991 m above sea level. Your tour begins in the Miquicocha lagoon and continues through the Sacya, Puru Puru and Vado river gorges. This basin occupies an area of 163.70 km2, representing 5.5% of the total area of the Casma river basin (2,990.70 km2); The entire basin is humid and the average annual rainfall in the hydrographic unit varies from 350 to 800 mm.

=== Climate ===
Pampas Grande is cold, with dry summers (May–September) with sunny days that have average temperatures of 17 °C, however temperatures can reach up to 24 degrees. During the night, the temperature drops and can get as low as 8 °C, which can produce frost. In winter (October–March), the days are cloudy with frequent drizzles and heavy rains. The average temperature reaches 14 °C and can drop to 5 °C.

== Ecology ==
Pampas Grande presents ecological formations of estepa, montano and páramo very humid sub-alpine, sub-humid mountains and puna. The sub-humid mountains have a sub-humid and cold climate and present a very rugged terrain, the current use of which is semi-intensive agriculture, mainly rainfed, with these characteristics being present in the upper part of the Chorrillos hamlet and the town of Pampas Grande. The sector of use of puna or paramo, presents a humid and frigid climate with poor vegetation that serves as grazing for sheep and cattle. This area is located mainly in the entire extension of the Matara hamlet and upper parts of the Quebradas Pacchac and Chorrillos basins.

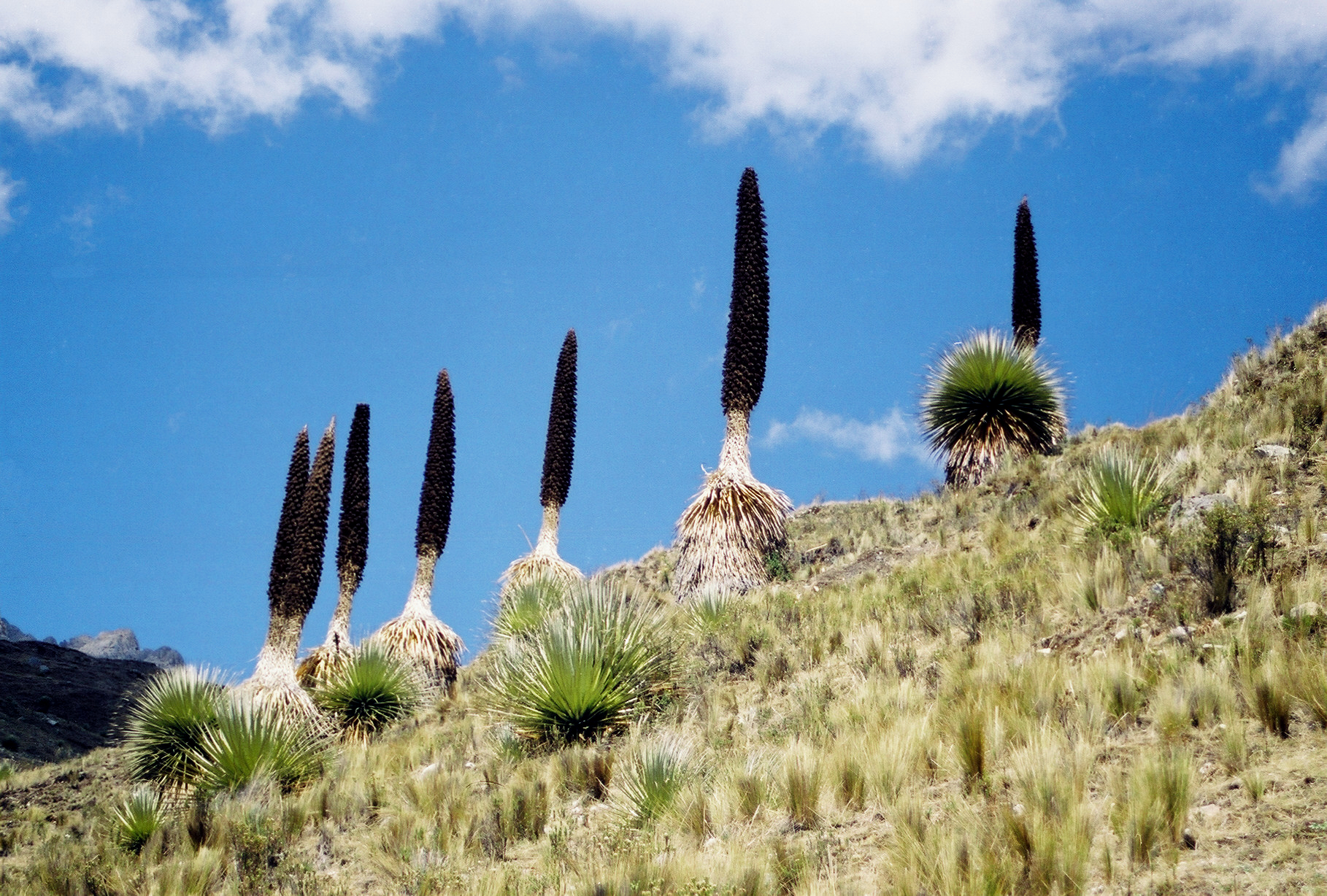
Puyas Raimondi characteristics of the highest part of the town, the most important group are located in Cerro Castilla.

=== Vegetation ===
The flora is largely dominated by Eucalyptus trees and the Swiss pine (Pinus cembra). They share the habitat with native Andean vegetation, such as quenual, tara, quishuar, molle, ichu, and an abundant number of aromatic plants such as cedar and muña.

=== Wildlife ===
Among the mammals, tarucas, deer, llamas, spectacled bears and foxes stand out in the thickest areas of the puna forests. Rodents such as vizcacha and muca are common in stony areas. There is also a great diversity of birds: raptors, such as the condor, sparrowhawk and kestrel; and nocturnal, such as the owl; waterfowl, such as the Andean duck; and passerines, such as the house sparrow, goldfinch, and nightingale. There are also migratory birds, such as swallows, which nest during the winter in wetlands. There are also lizards, snakes, toads, and frogs.

== History ==
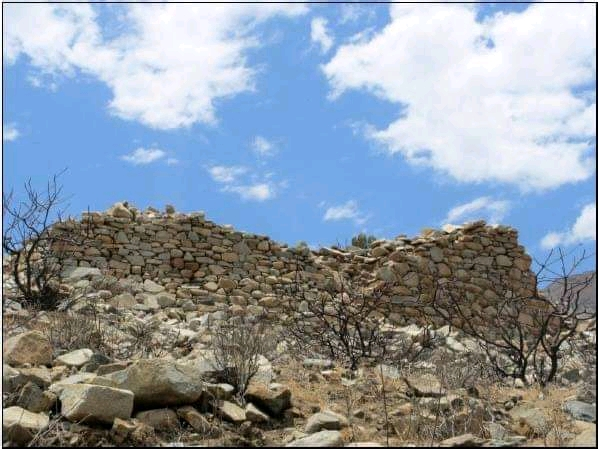
Kajur Archaeological Site.

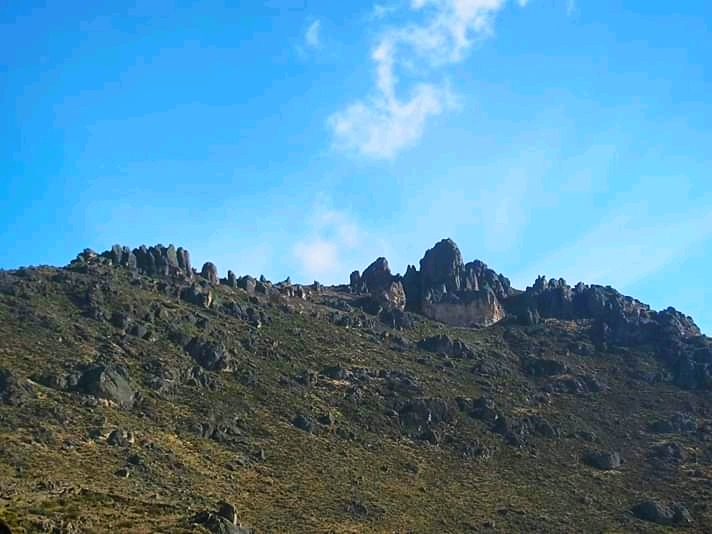
Canchón Summit.

Áncash ethnic groups upon the arrival of the Incas. The inhabitants of Pampas belonged to the Huaylas group.

=== Presence in ancient Peru and the Inca Empire ===
The archaeological site of Kajur is one of the oldest human settlements in this part of the Cordillera Negra. The archaeological site of Cuchicoto located near the summit of Canchón shows the influence of Recuay culture during the Early Intermediate period.

The priest Augusto Soriano Infante collected in 1953 a myth about the pre-Inca foundation of Pampas Grande:

This story speaks of two demigods, one male: Canchón and the other female: Huascarán.

They reigned in Pampas Grande and were husbands. Huascarán was a beautiful woman with light skin; She was an excellent cook; She prepared plenty of food for her 32 children and her husband. The flavor of its viands delighted Canchón. Happiness was clouded when Huascarán discovered that Canchón had a lover, Sutoc, a woman with dark skin who seduced Canchón with less abundant but more exquisite meals, had a nephew named Caullo who secretly was in love with Huascarán. In revenge for her husband's infidelity, Huascarán helped by Caullo, cut off Canchon's genitals cursing him so that in the future it would be sexually human waste. His testicles, which were thrown into the mountain, turned into cliffs when rolling, one was called Cuyocrumi (Stone that moves) and the other Huerururumi (Stone similar to the Huayruro's seed, jungle plant). Likewise, Canchón, when petrified, originated a summit of the same name. Sutoc suffered the same fate giving rise to another summit surrounded by his also petrified children. Before petrifying, he cursed Caullo, predicting that his bones would serve as stakes to tie animals and make pinculi. From this tragedy the Cordillera Negra was born.

Huascarán abandoned his home and his land; She headed north toward her, followed by her 32 children, who lagged behind as little ones; the oldest who went the fastest became the summits of Huantsan and Yerupajá. Tired and sad she rested in Asiac (stinking) where she lost a diaper from her tender little boy who became a glacier. There he urinated and defecated and as soon as he did his urine originated the lake of Conococha (warm lake) and its excreta to rocky tops. She continued her march, exhausted she sat down to rest in front of Yungay, there she became a high mountain of ice with two heads, because she carried her last son who was a baby on her back. Her other children who failed to reach it by petrifying one after another became other peaks. This is how the Cordillera Blanca was formed with a high number of heleros and lagoons as a result of the tears of Huascarán and his sons

— Augusto Soriano Infante

After a bloody and long campaign of resistance against the expanding Inca Empire led by Huayna Cápac, the Lordship of Huaylas surrendered to the Inca Empire at a high cost. The most important temple of the Huaylas, Pumacayán, was destroyed, and as a vassal, all the curacas of the mentioned ethnic groups were forced to send their daughters with the Inca to join it as secondary wives.

Following the population order of the Incas, the huaylas were subdivided into two parts: Hanan Huaylas and Hurin Huaylas, territories that included the current provinces of Huaylas, Yungay and Carhuaz in Hanan Huaylas, and the provinces of Huaraz, Recuay and Aija in Hurin Huaylas, Pampas would become part of this subdivision under the Inca administrative center of Recuay Viejo.

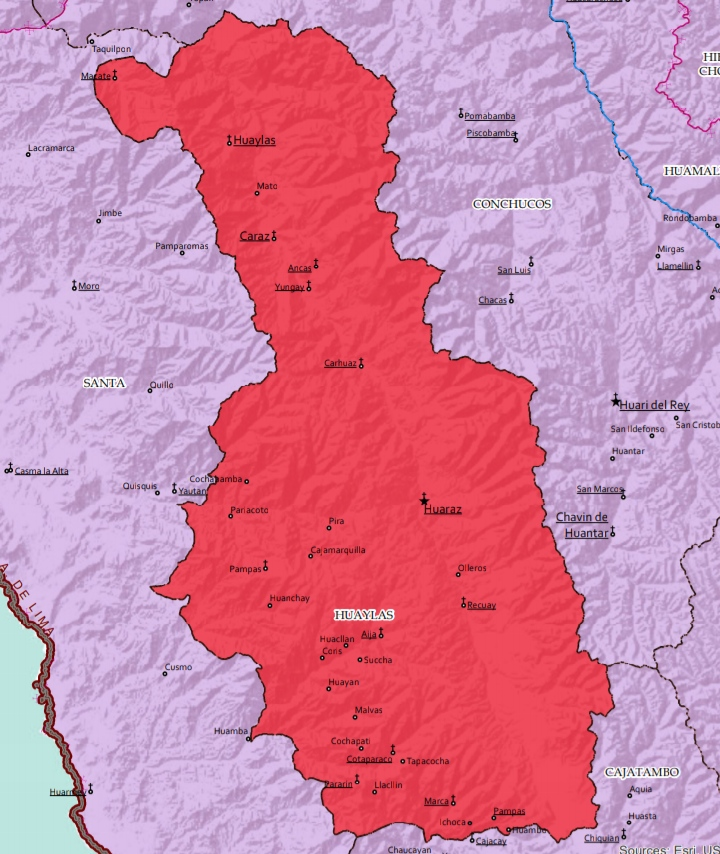
District of Huaylas in 1701.

=== Colonial time period ===
The inhabitants of the Huaylas ethnic group surrendered without resistance to the Spanish conquerors in order to get rid of the Incas. A few years later, the conquerors began with the distribution of these lands and the founding of plantations and sugar mills to take advantage of native labor.

After the Spanish conquest, the Pampas territory belonged to the encomienda de Recuay, which also included the towns of Recuay and Aija.

This encomienda was owned by the conquerors Jerónimo de Aliaga and Sebastián de Torres until the year 1537, remaining in the hands of Jerónimo de Aliaga until his return to Spain in 1550. After that year, the Recuay Encomienda entered into dispute, remaining in the hands of Juan de Aliaga until 1570, when the Encomienda de Recuay was united with that of Huaraz, being designated encomendero Don Hernando de Torres.

In 1605 in the part that is today Pampas Grande the huaranga of Ichocpoma belonging to the saya of Lurin-Huaylla was located. In 1651, in the Huaylas huaranga the doctrine of La Asunción de Huaylas was founded, with two partialities: Allauca and Ichoc. Here was the town of Pampas, with the ayllu Poma, west of Cajamarquilla.

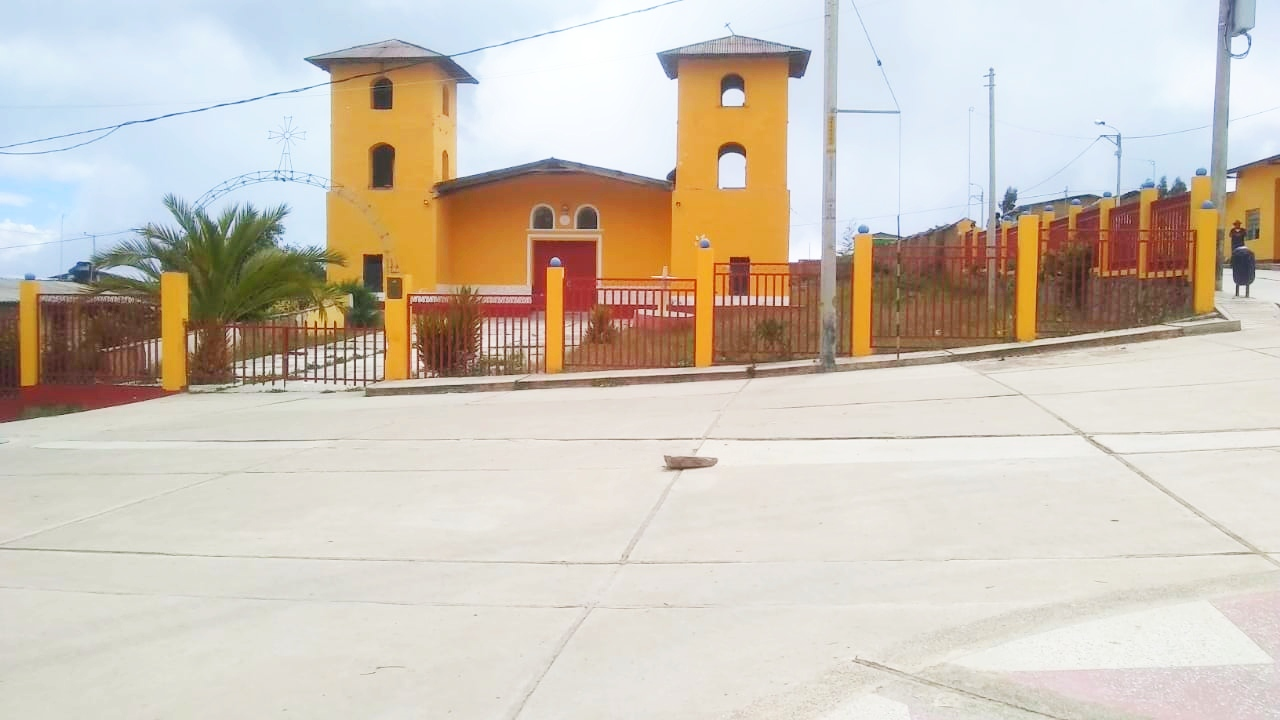
Main Church of Pampas Grande, founding place of the town.

=== Foundation ===
The foundation of the town was carried out during the government of the viceroy Francisco de Toledo, promoter of the reductions of Indians, that is, populations of natives with their main square, church, town hall and their own plots. Until then the native population lived dispersed in the territory and this measure facilitated the work of the priests and the authorities in general. It was the norm to establish the cities of the colonized territories by imposing the name of a saint under whose protection and devotion the foundation was made. The reduction was named "San Jerónimo de Pampas", possibly on September 30, the saint's holiday.

There is a tradition, according to which the first foreigners who set foot on Pampas land were the Portuguese, who came from Huánuco in search of mines, accompanied by Huanuqueño Indian miners, since in Huánuco there was a company of bell melters called María Angola.

Years later, the Spaniards arrived wanting to found a town in what is now La Victoria, (Note: Farmhouse located 9km from Pampas, before it became a farmhouse it had the name of Capllacoto) making a foundation for the chapel, from which it says the effigy of San Jerónimo had escaped. After several days of searching, they found the Patron Saint in the current site where the main church of Pampas Grande is, at that time the area where the church is, was not an appropriate site for an urbanization, they were chacras with platforms, full of ankicashan 6. Due to the difficulties the Spanish had moved to Cañipampa where they also formed a chapel, again the effigy of San Jerónimo escaped, being again in the same place, where there was a huge rock, whose edges were surrounded by pucakantu bushes, true bush with red flowers.

The Spanish decided to found the town of Pampas and for this the colonists had to be forced to capture Indians and make them Christians; for this work they subjected to their rigor the Indians who lived in the Inca town of Huamancalla and the entire summit of Utsuquí, plus the slopes of Canchón; These Indians had been decimated by the Portuguese, they were aware of the presence of foreigners, so that at the first appearance of a Spanish, they left an old woman who could not run, the Spanish in the company of certain converted Indians, to the going to surprise the residents they came across a cougar and when they captured the old woman they asked her what that place was called, who told them it was called "Sútoc", baptizing the old woman according to the Catholic rite with the name of María Soto Poma Prisoner, understanding that the real name in Quechua is María Sutuq Puman 7, the Spaniards gave the name of Puma family to the inhabitants of almost all of Pampas, who they reduced to Catholicism due to the denunciation of María Puma, with whose The Pampas town was founded by a family, immediately dividing the town into two neighborhoods, one on the left and the other on the right, also in Quechua, which are today lchoca-pomas and Allauca-pomas or what that it is the same ltsuq-pumas or pumas of the left and Alluq-pumas or pumas of the right; In short, the town of Pampas Grande is a town of the Poma family, the word puma when it became Spanish became Poma.

The temple of Pampas was built near a rock, possibly a huanca (monolith). Near the church, on a slightly sloping ground, the main square, the main streets and the stables were laid out, thus forming a checkerboard development. The buildings surrounding the plaza mayor were built and occupied by the first native families to arrive from Huamancalla and Canchón. The Spanish members of the clergy and of the viceregal institutions settled in the cloister of the temple, while the viceregal institutions such as the council, the school and the prison were built in the square.

When Santo Toribio de Mogrovejo visited the town of Pampas in 1597, he was assigned a stable tributary population of one hundred and fifty-four natives, and as head of doctrine, a population of 15 tributaries, 3 reserved, 40 confessional and 50 souls. This is recorded in the journal of the archbishop's second visit.

Folio 30v: [...] The people of Colcabamba, of the said doctrine that is also chaupi yunga, there are 44 tributary and 11 reserved Indians and 200 of confession and 280 souls, girls and adults. It is next to this town, a league from it, a small town called Ayas, which is of the doctrine of Pampas, in which there are 15 tributaries and 3 reserved and 40 of confession and 50 souls.

— Santo Toribio de Mogrovejo

=== Republican stage ===
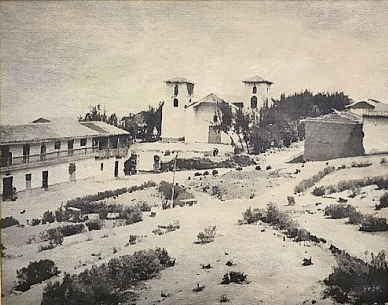
Plaza de Pampas before the 1970 earthquake, you can see the municipal office (left), the parent church (center) and the boys' school No. 335 (right).

The parish of Pampas Grande was recognized by Simón Bolívar in 1825, Pampas Grande was made up of the town of the same name and another called Huanchay. On July 25, 1857 the district of Pampas was created with its capital in the town of Pampas Grande. In 1873, by decree of the government of Don Manuel Pardo, the Municipal Fiscal School was created. In 1874 the sage Antonio Raimondi passed through Pampas, where he made the discovery of the Puya raimondii, towards Culebras. In 1907 the district of La Libertad broke off from Pampas.

In 1908 the Post Office was inaugurated, being its first recipient, Don Cipriano Valverde and at the same time Governor of the district. During those years offices, circulars and dispatches were sent in the name of authorities and citizens that did not exist in the town, during the General Elections of 1908, after the defeat of José Pardo, some propaganda packages arrived by mail to Pampas for politicians who were not from the town, realizing that what was happening was that in Ancash there were three towns with the name of Pampas. After that event, the governor began to request before Congress that they differentiate the name of those three homonymous towns, the name change was made by Mr. César del Río being deputy for Huaraz, designating the town with the name of Pampas Grande, (Note: The name change was not approved by the Congress at the time, however, the town's government authorities used the name de Pampas Grande de facto.) in the year of 1908.

In 1910 the Mixed Fiscal School was inaugurated, with its first director being Don Juan Gaona. In 1912 the women's school was separated under the direction of Mrs. Clara Jiraldo. From 1913, the sports field began to flatten, a work where a worker named Juan García Chilca lost his life. In 1920, the School Center No. 341 was inaugurated under the direction of Don Arturo García. In 1924, an outbreak of bubonic plague occurred in Pampas Grande, which had claimed seven deaths within 24 hours. Being necessary the visit of doctor Eleazar Guzmán Barrón, who directed a sanitary cord in the province of Huaraz; in order to stop the outbreak. In 1928, the School Center No. 341 was closed becoming Fiscal School No. 3378, and the Women's School Center No. 347 was inaugurated. In 1933, the southern part of the Pampas district was creates the district of Huanchay. The Fiscal School of the Victory, was inaugurated in June 1940, its first director being Mrs. Vilelmina Ardiles Quijano. In 1941, the Colcabamba district emerged from Pampas, this being the last time a new jurisdiction was created based on the Pampas territory. The Sháncac Mixed Prosecutor's School was opened in May 1950 under the direction of Delia Dextre Llanos. In 1965 the Colegio Nacional Mixto San Jerónimo was founded. Before the 1970 earthquake Pampas Grande had a post office and telegraph service.

In 2009, a popular consultation was held to change the name of the town of Pampas to Pampas Grande. On March 15, 2012 the town was formally renamed Pampas Grande through Law No. 29846.

== Demography ==
Ethnic groups in Pampas Grande (National Census 2017)
1. Amerindians (63.7%)
2. Mestizos (34.4%)
3. African descent (0.78%)

According to the projections of the National Institute of Statistics and Informatics (INEI) as of 2017, the district of Pampas Grande has 956 inhabitants, of whom 477 are men and 479 are women, 356 live in the urban nucleus of Pampas, while the rest live in small and medium-sized population centers in rural areas. The population is mainly Spanish-speaking, with a good proportion having Quechua as a second language. From an ethnic point of view, the population is mestizo, descendants of the Quechua-Huaylas and Spanish ethnic groups.

The district population has experienced a frank decline in the last 20 years, during which time it lost more than 500 inhabitants. Equal to the demographic decrease of the town, which reduced its population between 2005 and 2017. In recent years, the town's population has decreased, due to the high rate of migration of young people in search of better job opportunities, choosing Lima and Huaraz as their main destinations. .

Demographic evolution of Pampas Grande
1593	1877	2005	2007	2017
500	760	447	412	356

=== Town planning ===
Pampas urban planning is conditioned by sloping terrain. The surface of the plateau where the town is located is undulating, due to this, the search for flatter lands fostered urban growth with inlets and outlets. The old town center presents straight streets with the typical checkerboard layout of the towns founded by Spanish, with the arrival of the departmental road AN-1441 the town expanded in its direction. Urban development has been favored by improving the quality of life of the inhabitants of the Pampas, materializing in the construction of initial, primary and secondary institutions, the health center and the opening of new streets. It is expected that in a few years, the Matara hamlet will be annexed as a new neighborhood to the town, so that it would have approximately 500 inhabitants.

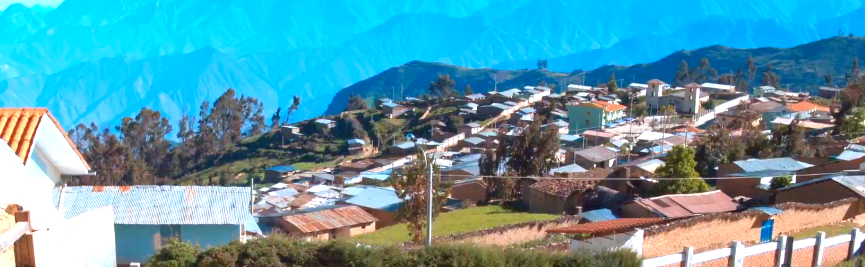
Panoramic of the town

=== Living place ===
Most of the houses are in a regular state of conservation. Despite the climate of the area, the houses of the community do not have thermal insulation or artisan gutters to drain rainwater. The Pampas urban area has 113 homes. The vast majority of these homes were built from 1974, since the earthquake destroyed the vast majority of homes. There are also houses that are made with rammed earth walls, and roofed with wooden logs covered with calamine.

The typical house is on one or two levels, and is composed of a dining room, a common bedroom, a kitchen and a backyard for washing clothes and raising minor animals. The houses are not sufficiently isolated from the outside or from the animal husbandry spaces. The brick houses have between one and three levels, are functionally better distributed, and are made up of various environments. In some cases, the home uses the front environment for minor commerce for local consumption.

== Politics ==
=== Municipal administration ===
The town as capital of the district of Pampas Grande is governed by the District Municipality of Pampas Grande, which has jurisdiction throughout the territory of the district. For the period 2019-2022 the district municipality is constituted by the mayor Inocencio Villafuerte Colonia, the deputy mayor and four regidores. Jerome Auquinivin is the kuraka (mayor of Indians) in 1646, the oldest governor of whom is referenced.

== Economy ==
The city of Pampas sustains its economy in agriculture and livestock basically, although the trade of these and other products is also an important item in this city; Tourism and mining, to a lesser extent, are also sources of economic income. Of the total population, (according to INEI and in reference to provincial data) 55% of the population constitutes approximately the economically active population (EAP) of which a considerable number of people migrate to nearby cities or outside the department in search of work, since the income generated by agricultural production is low.

=== Primary sector ===
==== Agricultural activity ====
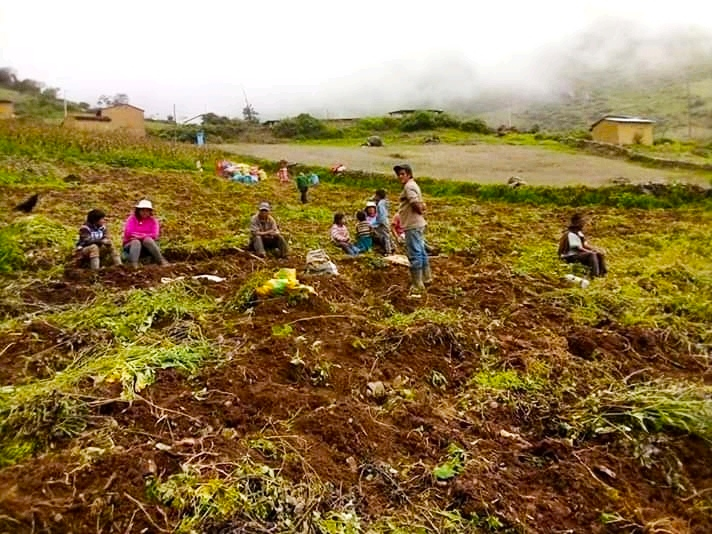
Potato harvest in Pampas Grande

The cultivation lands are conducted individually; Such plots have extensions from approximately 0.05 to 1 hectare. While natural pasture areas belong 40% to private owners and 60% are for joint use by the beneficiaries. The potential of agricultural area is 600 ha; which are currently used by 20% due to the lack of water resources. Situation that needs improvement with the implementation of irrigation projects, with the use of water for irrigation from springs in forest areas and zones; afforestation that at the same time will allow greater infiltration of rainwater to the subsoil, as well as improving the microclimate in this area.

==== Livestock activity ====
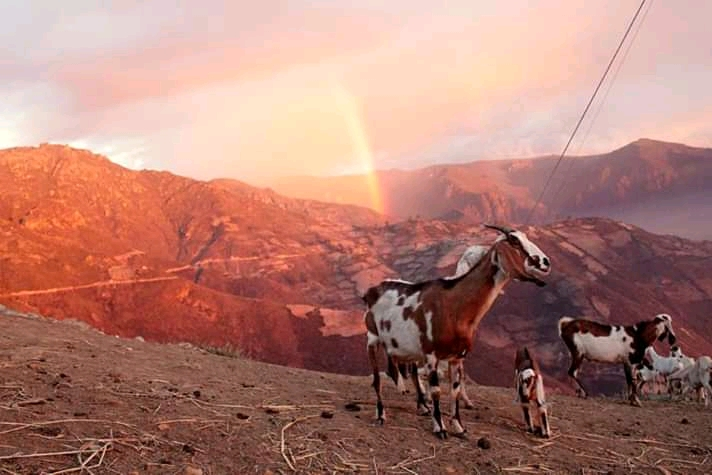

Livestock activity is extensive, with the rearing of sheep, and to a lesser extent cattle, each family on average has 10 sheep and 4 cattle. In addition, most families are dedicated to raising minor animals such as guinea pigs, rabbits, and birds.

=== Secondary and tertiary sector ===
==== Commercial activity and services ====
It is an incipient activity that reflects the expansion of the lower sector of the district, especially the urban area. There are some businesses, such as lodgings, restaurants and wineries, that take advantage of its strategic location on the Cajamarquilla - Pampas Grande - Pariacoto carriageway to offer restaurant services, the sale of fuel and some products produced in Pampas, such as cheese. The main point of commercialization is the city of Pampas, which supplies the urban area, hamlets and annexes in the same district.

The main agricultural products marketed are: corn, potatoes, wheat, whose production is marketed by up to 40% to intermediaries that supply the cities of Huaraz and Lima, leaving the other percentage for self-consumption. The other group of crops (peas, broad beans) whose production is minimal are for self-consumption and eventually marketed by the farmers themselves in the city of Pampas Grande.

==== Tourism ====
The economic activity of the Pampas district is not oriented to tourism. However, the population recognizes in its cultural heritage an opportunity for the tourist development of the district. The festivals and customs of the area can represent a source of tourist potential. However, there has been a progressive loss of cultural identity.

== See also ==
- Huaraz province
- Pampas Grande District
- Huanchay District
- La Libertad District
