= Kunkush Kancha =

Mountain in Peru

- Location within Peru

Highest point
- Elevation: 4,600 m (15,100 ft)
- Coordinates: 9°55′07″S 77°35′06″W

Geography
- Location: Peru, Ancash Region
- Parent range: Andes, Cordillera Negra

Kunkush Kancha (Ancash Quechua kunkush Puya raimondii, Quechua kancha enclosure; corral, 'the Puya raimondii field', also spelled Cuncushcancha) is a mountain in the Cordillera Negra in the Andes of Peru which reaches a height of approximately 4,600 m (15,100 ft). It is located in the Ancash Region, Huarmey Province, Malvas District, and in the Recuay Province, Cotaparaco District.
