= Puya gigas =

Scientific classification
- Kingdom: Plantae
- Clade: Tracheophytes
- Clade: Angiosperms
- Clade: Monocots
- Clade: Commelinids
- Order: Poales
- Family: Bromeliaceae
- Genus: Puya
- Subgenus: Puya subg. Puyopsis
- Species: P. gigas

Binomial name
- Puya gigas André

Synonyms
- Puya gigantea André, 1879

Species of plant

Puya gigas is a flowering plant of the family Bromeliaceae.

== Description ==
The species is native to the Andes of Colombia. It is the second largest bromeliad after Puya raimondii. Individuals have a basal rosette of leaves from which a monocarpic inflorescence may emerge to a height of up to 10 m (33 ft), most of which is the peduncle.
