= Huayan (disambiguation) =

Huayan is a school of Chinese Mahayana Buddhism.

Huayan may also refer to:

- Huayan District, in Huarmey, Peru
- Huayan Railway Station, a Yiwan Railway station in Hubei Province, China
- Hwaeom, Korean transmission of the Huayan school
- Kegon, Japanese transmission of the Huayan school
