= Canchón =

Mountain in Peru

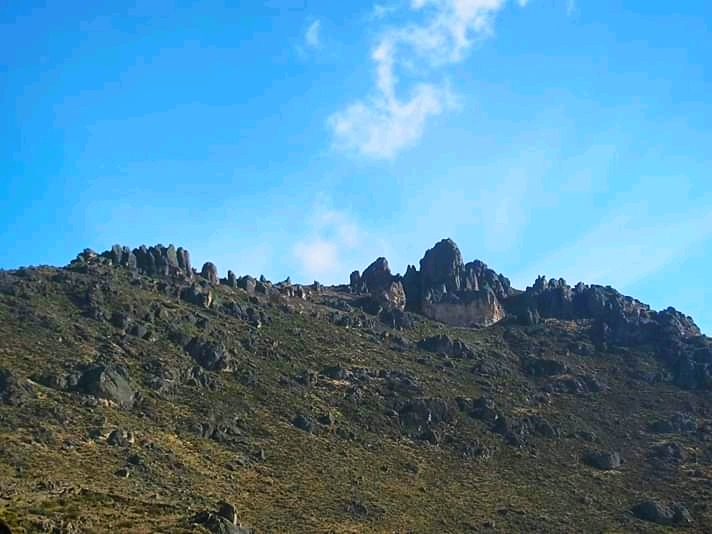

Highest point
- Elevation: 4,137 m (13,573 ft)
- Coordinates: 9°40′21″S 77°50′39″W

Geography
- Location within Peru
- Location: Peru, Ancash Region
- Parent range: Andes, Cordillera Negra

Canchón is a granite mountain in the Peruvian Andes, with an official altitude of 4137 m above sea level. It is located between the districts of Pampas Grande and Huanchay, the province of Huaraz, Ancash region, in the orographic sector called Cordillera Negra.
