= Ututu Hirka =

Mountain in Peru

- Location within Peru

Highest point
- Elevation: 4,600 m (15,100 ft)
- Coordinates: 9°52′29″S 77°37′45″W

Geography
- Location: Peru, Ancash Region
- Parent range: Andes, Cordillera Negra

Ututu Hirka (Quechua ututu a small viper, Ancash Quechua hirka mountain, "ututu mountain", also spelled Ututo Irca) is a mountain in the Cordillera Negra in the Andes of Peru which reaches a height of approximately 4,600 m (15,100 ft). It lies in the Ancash Region, Huarmey Province, on the border of the districts of Huayan and Malvas. Ututu Hirka lies southeast of Pillaka.
