= Huarmey province =

Coordinates: 10°04′07″S 78°09′37″W

Huarmey
- Province
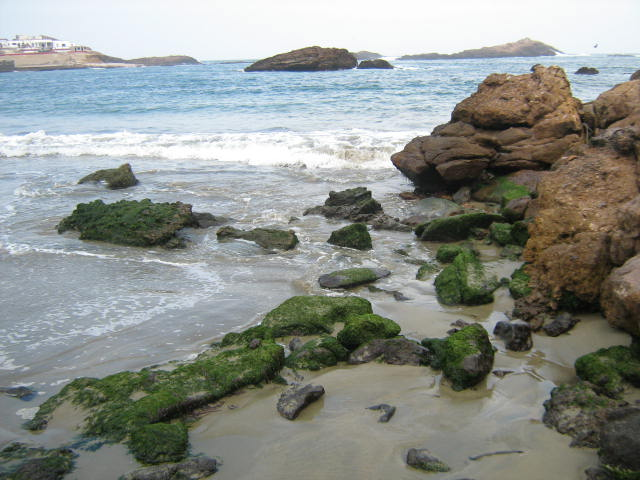
- Beach of Tuquillo

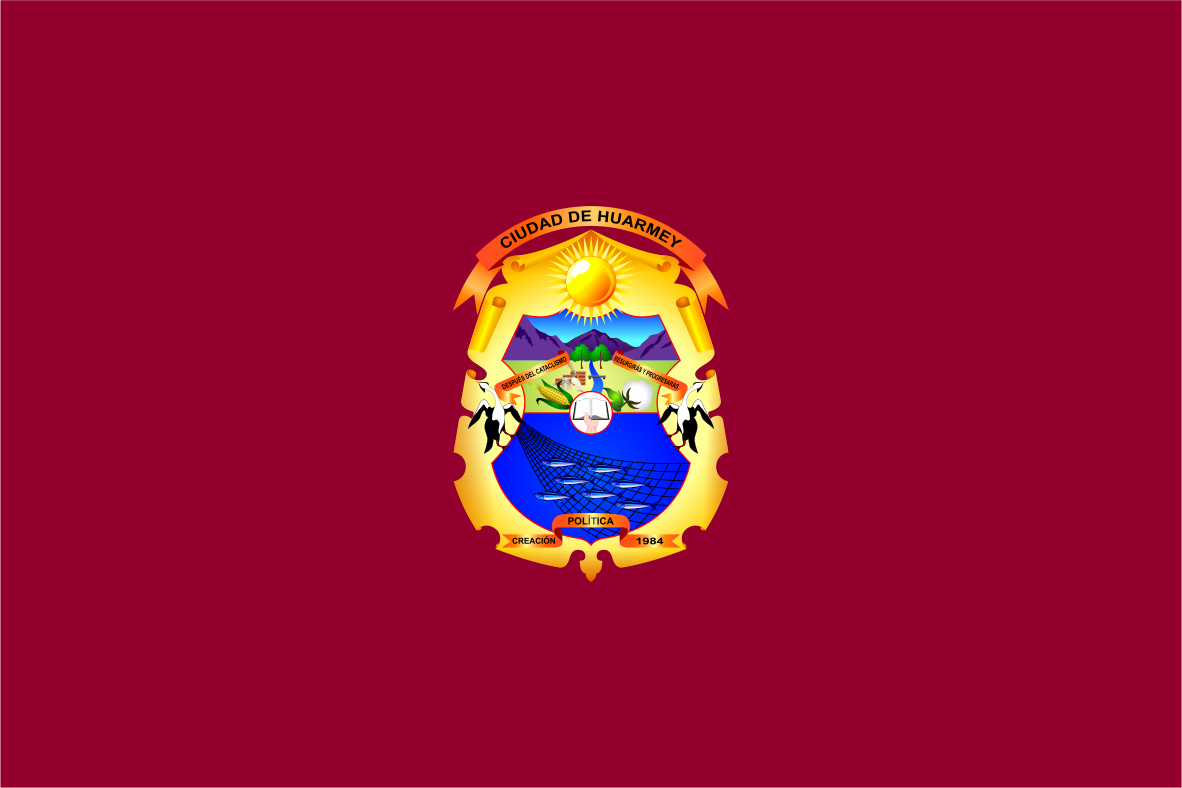
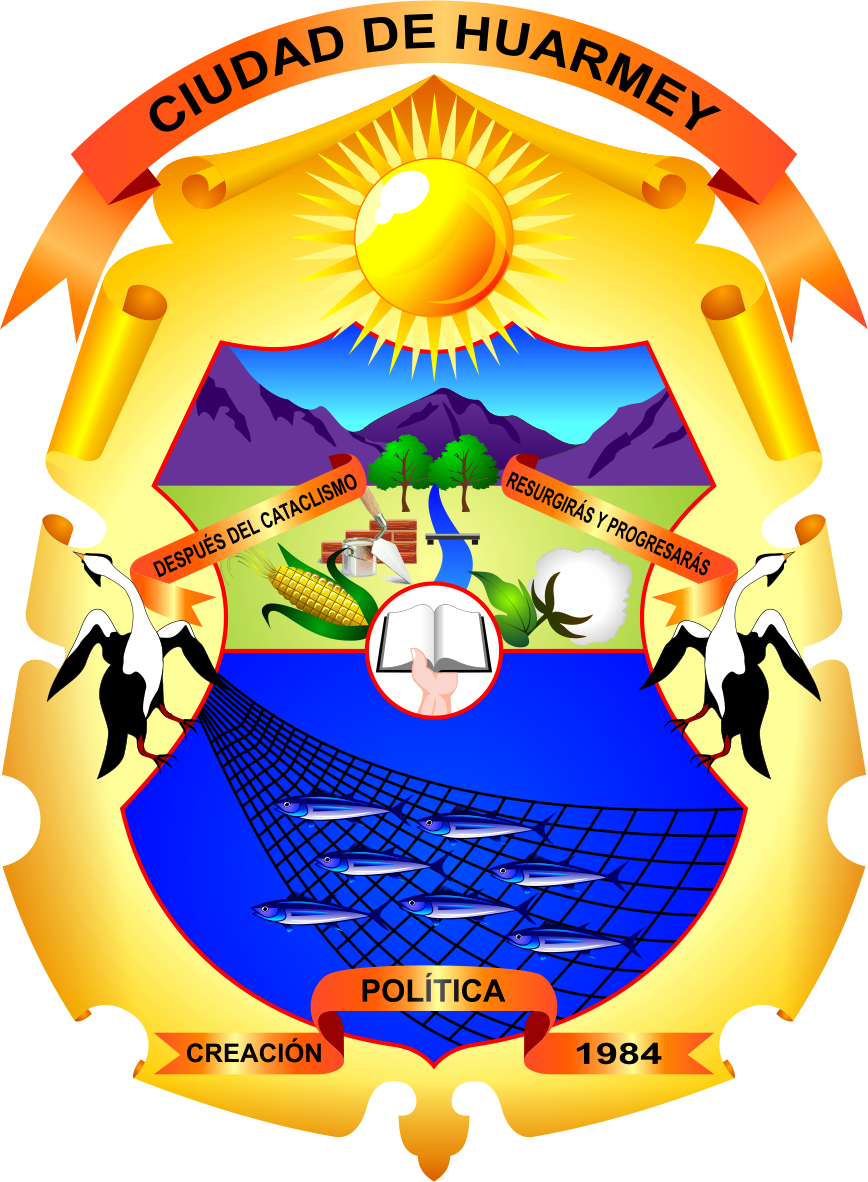
- Flag Coat of arms

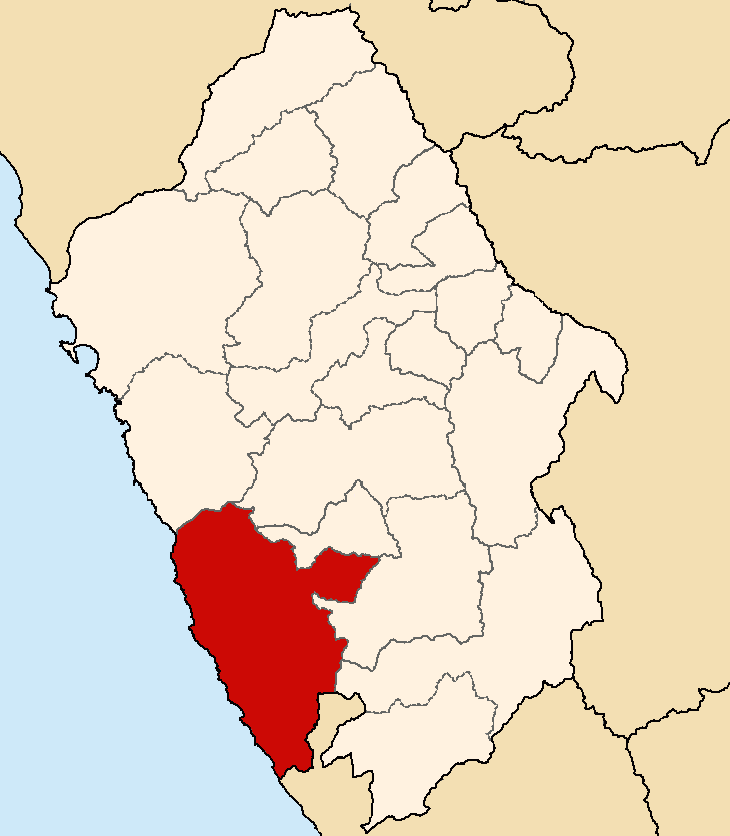
- Location of Huarmey in the Ancash Region
- Country: Peru
- Region: Ancash
- Founded: December 20, 1984
- Capital: Huarmey

Government
  - Mayor: Dr. Pedro Tapia Marcelo (2006)

Area
  - Total: 3,908.42 km^{2} (1,509.05 sq mi)

Population (2017)
  - Total: 30,560
  - Density: 7.819/km^{2} (20.25/sq mi)
- Website: http://www.munihuarmey.gob.pe/

Huarmey is one of 20 provinces located in the Ancash Region of Peru. It takes around 4 hours to arrive to Huarmey from Lima by bus and its main economic activities include agriculture, fishing, tourism, and mineral shipping.

== Political division ==
Huarmey is divided into five districts, which are:

- Cochapeti
- Culebras
- Huarmey
- Huayan
- Malvas

== See also ==
- Kunkush Kancha
- Pillaka
- Ututu Hirka
