= Malvas District =

Coordinates: 9°55′01″S 77°40′59″W

Malvas
- District
- Interactive map of Malvas
- Country: Peru
- Region: Ancash
- Province: Huarmey
- Founded: February 10, 1892
- Capital: Malvas

Government
  - Mayor: Hector Hugo Maldonado Colonia

Area
  - Total: 219.52 km^{2} (84.76 sq mi)
- Elevation: 3,106 m (10,190 ft)

Population (2005 census)
  - Total: 1,110
  - Density: 5.06/km^{2} (13.1/sq mi)
- Time zone: UTC-5 (PET)
- UBIGEO: 021105

Malvas District is one of five districts of the province Huarmey in Peru.

== See also ==
- Kunkush Kancha
- Ututu Hirka
