= Pampas Grande District =

Coordinates: 10.117°S 77.400°W

Pampas Grande
- District
- Interactive map of Pampas Grande
- Country: Peru
- Region: Ancash
- Province: Huaraz
- Capital: Pampas

Government
  - Mayor: Inocencio Nemecio Villafuerte Colonia

Area
  - Total: 357.81 km^{2} (138.15 sq mi)
- Elevation: 3,699 m (12,136 ft)

Population (2005 census)
  - Total: 1,451
  - Density: 4.055/km^{2} (10.50/sq mi)
- Time zone: UTC-5 (PET)
- UBIGEO: 020109

Pampas District is one of twelve districts of the province Huaraz in Peru. Its capital is the city of Pampas Grande.

== Languages ==
In the district speaks Quechua and Spanish
