= Luigi Piacenza =

Italian botanist (1935–2009)

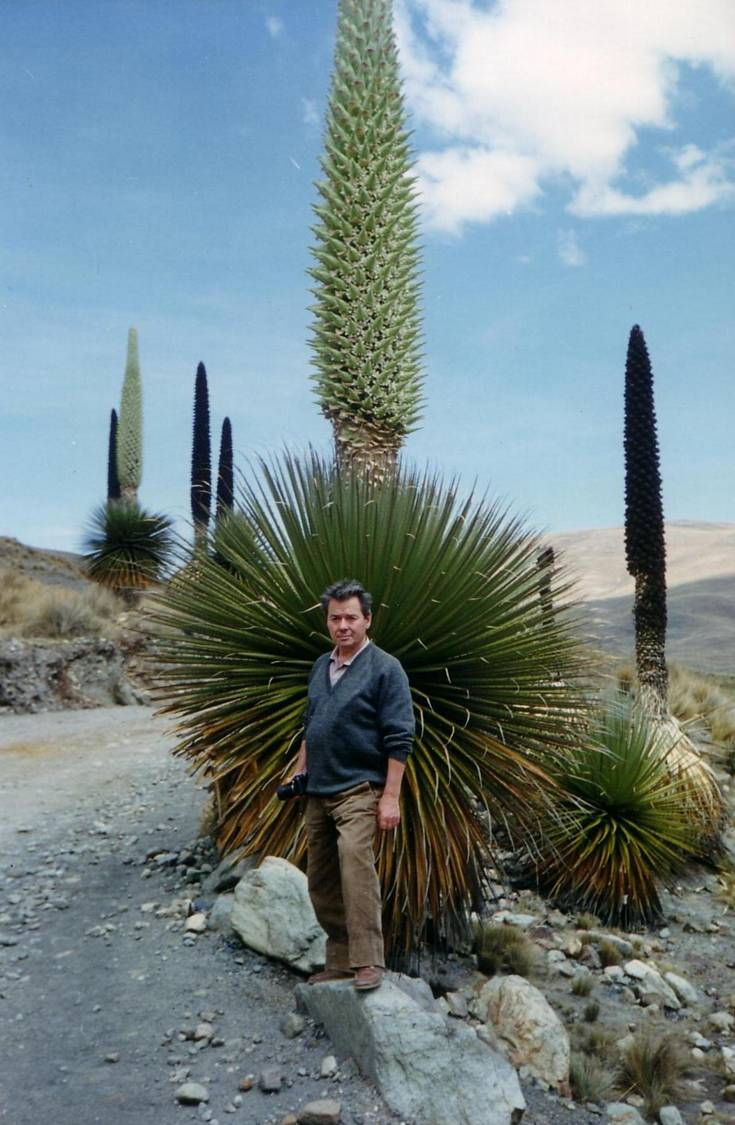
- pictured with a puya raimondii
- Born: March 22, 1935; Bussolengo - Italy
- Died: November 14, 2009 (aged 74); Genoa, Italy
- Citizenship: Italian
- Known for: studying pre-incaic and pre-columbian flora of Peru
- Awards: Visiting Professor of the Scientific University of Sur-Lima, Peru, Investigador asociado centro Mallqui (The Bioanthropology Foundation Peru), Ilo Peru
- Scientific career
- Fields: ethnobotany
- Institutions: CISRAP (Italian Centre for Study and Research of Pre-Columbian Archaeology) Brescia It., Centro Mallqui - Peru, University of Lima,

Luigi Piacenza (22 March 1935 – 14 November 2009) was an Italian botanist, with expertise in ethnobotany and paleobotany.

== Biography ==
After having enrolled in the Navy where he was able to study electronics, he delved deeper into the sector of radar and audio-visual techniques. Following a journey into Asia with his geologist brother, he moved to the city of Genoa during the sixties and there he started to attend the Federico Lunardi American Museum. Here, his passion for studies into ancient civilizations was born, an interest which he was to keep throughout all of the ensuing years. The start of a highly productive scientific partnership came about after his meeting up with Giuseppe Orefici, an archaeologist from the city of Brescia who was at that time involved in an excavation expedition in Cahuachi (Nasca-Peru). This was then to develop into work in this particular field in South America and then as a consequence into the analysis of botanical remains found in excavations.

== Studies ==
Piacenza dedicated approximately 25 years of his life to numerous scientific projects including conferences, dissertations, the writing of a plant life book, scientific research as an archaebotanist studying vegetation remains found in tombs, offerings made to the deceased and ancient foodstuffs. Also, he has studied the development of agriculture and its changes over the course of time, laying an emphasis on the relationship between present-day flora and the archaeological one.

He made special studies into the analysis of the eating habits of ancient pre-Incaic and pre-Columbian people. One of these research projects was carried out on Easter Island and concerned the analysis of vegetable fibre that was supposed to have played a part in the movement of the impressive Moai statues.

Following his studies into the Chiribaya ethnic group was went by the name of "Investigador asociado centro Mallqui" (The Bioanthropology Foundation Peru), Ilo Peru".

His lessons given at the University of Lima earned him the name of "the Visiting Professor of the Scientific University of Sur- Lima, Peru".

His most recent work has been his contribution to the latest book on the Nasca desert, entitled "Nasca, The Desert and the Gods of Cahuachi", Graphediciones Edition.

In the March 2010 a conference was held in Warsaw with the patronage of Unesco, where a reading performance from piece of research produced in collaboration with doctor Elvina Pieri was held in commemoration to this work.

== Projects (participation) ==
- Nasca Project (started 1982- conclusion foreseen 2011)

Research into offerings and the setting up of the first large size Botanical showcase in the Nasca Museum.

- Contisuyo Project (started 1997) south coast of Peru along the Osmore river.

Examination of numerous tombs and funeral decorations of the ethnic group known as the Chiribaya. Creation of botanical showcase at the museum of Algarrobal.

- Rapa Nui Project- Easter Island (1990–1993)

Ligabue Research and Study Centre, Venice, in collaboration with the University of Chile, the Sebastiano Englert Museum and the Research and Study Centre of Pre-Columbian Archaeology. Doctor Orefici organised three consecutive expeditions to Rapa Nui in which Luigi Piacenza took part in two.

- La Venta archaeological project (1997)- Director Doctor Orefici- speleological team "La Venta", archaeologist Professor Thomas Lee.

Exploration into the caves of the deep canyon of the Laventa River approximately 80 km to the west of Tuxtla Gutierrez Chapas Mexico. Special research into the botanical remains of the Lazo "cueva" (cave).

== Works ==
- "La Quinoa nel Mondo Andino" ( Chenopodium Quinoa, Wild), in " Archeologia e Società nell’America Precolombiana" ( National Conference Event), 143-152, 15–17 November 1985, Biella, Italy.
- "I resti botanici del centro cerimoniale di Cahuachi", Archaeology, Science and Society in Pre-Columbian America, International Conference Event, 41-51, Pre-Columbian Archaeological Italian Studies and Research Centre, Brescia 1998
- "American Plants" in The Rediscovery of America, Marietti Genova editing house 1989 ISBN 9788821199110
- "Pseudocereali andini" in: 1492-1992 - Animali e piante dalle Americhe all'Europa, editing house Sagep - Genoa 1991
- "La vegetazione dell'Isola di Pasqua e le sue modifiche nel tempo", in "Rapa-Nui" by Giancarlo Ligabue and Giuseppe Orefici, editing house Erizzo - Venice 1994 ISBN 978-88-7077-032-2 ISBN 887077032X
- "Evidenze archeologiche di alcuni prodotti agricoli del Nuovo Mondo introdotti in Europa", in American Plants in the Scrivia Valley – Extract from events of Ligurian Academy of Science and Letters, 155-162 Series V, LI - Genoa 1994
- "La produzione delle fibre vegetali nell'Isola di Pasqua", in La Terra dei Moai, editing house Erizzo - Venice 1995 ISBN 978-88-7077-034-6 ISBN 8870770346
- "Los restos botànicos de la Cueva del Lazo, Ocozocoautla - Chiapas", in Investigaciòn, Revista ICACH 1,5 :25-38 ED. UNICACH Tuxtla Gutièrrez - Mexico 2000
- "I resti botanici del sito archeologico di Cahuachi (Nasca, Perù)", in Informatore Botanico Italiano, 33 (1), 51-55, Società Botanica Italiana (Work Group for Tropical Botany ), Florence 2001
- "Analisi delle proteine di riserva estratte da semi antichi peruviani", in Informatore Botanico Italiano, 33 (1) 56-59, Italian Botanical Society, M. Durante, L. Piacenza, P. Bruschi and R. Bernardi, Florence 2001
- "Evidencias Botànicas en Asentamientos Nasca", in Boletìn del Museo de Arqueologìa y Antropologìa, vol. 5, n.1: 3-13, ISSN 1680-4236 Universidad Nacional Mayor de San Marcos, Lima - Peru 2002
- "Las Ofrendas de vegetales en el centro ceremonial de Cahuachi", in Il Sacro e il paesaggio nell'America Indigena, Atti del Colloquio Internazionale, A CURA DI: Domenici, D. Orsini, C. Venturoli, S.I, 14:309-317, CLUEB Bologna 2003
- "Las plantas en las ofrendas funeraria Chiribaya", in Congreso de Americanistas en Perugia - May 2003
- "Tradiciones gastronòmicas en diferentes Culturas precolombinas del sur peruano", Quaderni di Thule. Italian Journal of American Studies, IV, Argo Editing House, Lecce, pp. 47–52 - 2004
- "Túmulos, ideología y paisaje de la fase alto Ramírez del Valle de Azapa" Revista Chungará version On-line ISSN 0717-7356 Chungará (Arica) v.36 supl.espec. t1 Arica sep. 2004 - doi:10.4067/S0717-73562004000300028 Volumen Especial, 2004. Páginas 261-272 Chungara, Revista de Antropología Chilena
- "Las plantas en las ofrendas funeraria Chiribaya", Quaderni di Thule. Italian Journal of American Studies, III-1, 237-244, Argo Editing House - 2005
- "Flores y floristas en la sociedad Azteca", in Quaderni di Thule, International Conference of American Studies, Events of XXVII - Argo Editing House, Perugia 2005
- "Flores y floristas en la sociedad Azteca", in Institute for Latin American Studies, R.A.S. Moscow M-35, Published in the magazine "Latinskaya Amerika" ("Latin America ", N°1), 69-76, Mosca 2006
- "La vegetazione antica e l'attuale situazione floristica dell'Isola di Pasqua", in the Italian Botanical Informer, 39 suppl. 1, L. Piacenza, A. Ranfa e M.R. Cagiotti - 2007
- "NASCA. El desierto de los dioses de Cahuachi" Author : Orefici Giuseppe Editorial : Hardcover, 260 Pages, Graph Ediciones 2010 ISBN 9786124535925

== Participation works ==
- LA CUCINA PREINCAICA NELL'ARCHEOLOGIA, by Luigi Piacenza (21 May 2009 - Fondazione Casa America Villa Rosazza –"Genova Perù Conference, on the "Ali del Gusto")
- I VOLATILI NEI MITI PREINCAICI, by Luigi Piacenza (23 May 2009 – Natural History Museum "G. Doria" (Genova) Convegno " Il volo del Condor: dal Perù a Genova")
