= Huarmey District =

Coordinates: 10°04′07″S 78°09′37″W

Huarmey
- District
- Interactive map of Huarmey
- Country: Peru
- Region: Ancash
- Province: Huarmey
- Capital: Huarmey

Government
  - Mayor: Pedro Gorki Tapia Marcelo

Area
  - Total: 2,899.76 km^{2} (1,119.60 sq mi)
- Elevation: 7 m (23 ft)

Population (2005 census)
  - Total: 20,775
  - Density: 7.1644/km^{2} (18.556/sq mi)
- Time zone: UTC-5 (PET)
- UBIGEO: 021101

Huarmey District is one of five districts of the province Huarmey in Peru.
