= Cochapeti District =

Coordinates: 9°58′59″S 77°39′00″W

Cochapeti Quchap'iti
- District
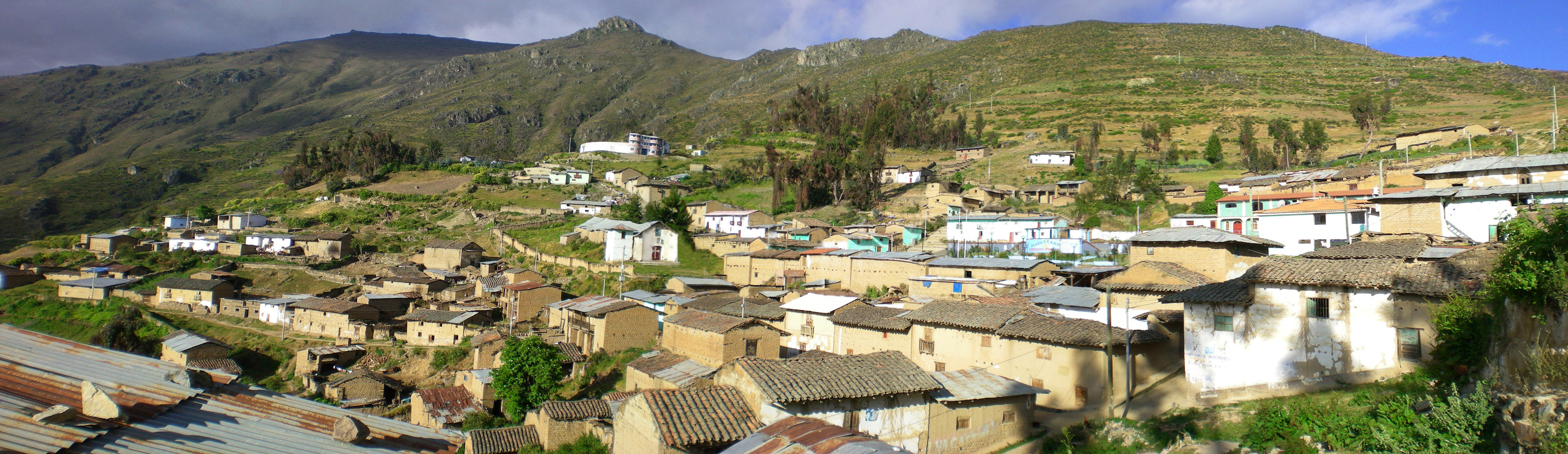
- Skyline
- Interactive map of Cochapeti
- Country: Peru
- Region: Ancash
- Province: Huarmey
- Founded: March 5, 1936
- Capital: Cochapeti

Government
  - Mayor: Ing. Faustina Vilma Caro Soto

Area
  - Total: 100.02 km^{2} (38.62 sq mi)
- Elevation: 3,498 m (11,476 ft)

Population (2005 census)
  - Total: 957
  - Density: 9.57/km^{2} (24.8/sq mi)
- Time zone: UTC-5 (PET)
- UBIGEO: 021102

Cochapeti District is one of five districts of the province Huarmey in Peru.
