= Antonio Raimondi =

Italian-born Peruvian geographer and scientist

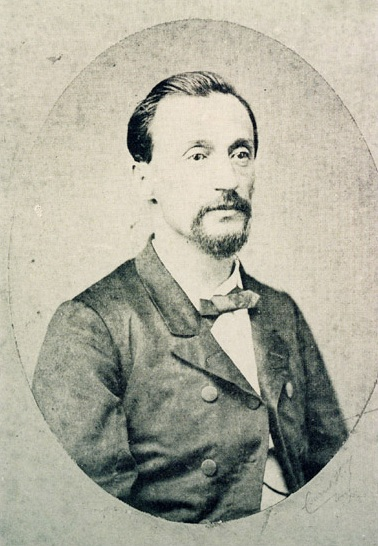
- Antonio Raimondi c. 1860
- Born: September 19, 1826; Milan, Austrian Empire
- Died: October 26, 1890 (aged 64); San Pedro de Lloc, Peru
- Occupations: Investigator, geographer, explorer, and writer

Antonio Raimondi (September 19, 1826 – October 26, 1890) was an Italian-born Peruvian geographer and scientist.

Born in Milan, Raimondi emigrated to Peru in 1850, arriving at the port of Callao on July 28. In 1851 he became a professor of natural history. In 1856, he was one of the founding professors of the medical school at the National University of San Marcos; in 1861, he founded the analytical chemistry department. Raimondi died in 1890 in the town of San Pedro de Lloc in the La Libertad Region of northern Peru. His house where he died, situated close the town's main plaza, has been converted into a museum.

Throughout his career, Raimondi displayed a passion for all things Peruvian. He undertook at least 18 expeditions across Peru, visiting all regions to study the nation's geography, geology, botany, zoology, ethnography, and archaeology. In 1875, he collected his findings in the massive tome El Perú, which was subsequently republished in numerous editions over the next 40 years. The Raimondi Museum in Lima houses some of the collections he gathered in his travels.

A popular historical figure in Peru, Raimondi is the namesake of many Peruvian cultural institutions, including schools, theaters, museums, and institutes of higher learning. The Antonio Raymondi Province in the Ancash Region of Peru is also named after him. Some of his biological discoveries also carry his name, such as the Neoraimondia genus of cactus.

== Bibliography ==
=== Works ===
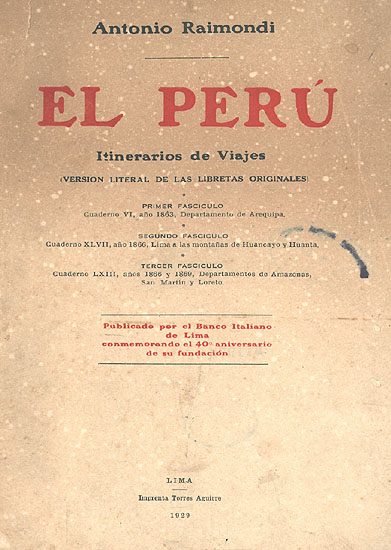
Cover of El Perú. Itinerarios de Viajes (1929).

- 1854: Informes sobre la existencia de guano en las islas de Chincha presentados por la Comisión nombrada por el gobierno peruano, con los planos levantados por la misma Comisión, Tipografía "El Heraldo", Lima
- 1857: Elementos de botánica aplicada a la medicina y a la industria en los cuales se trata especialmente de las plantas del Perú, Imp. Mariano Murga, Lima
- 1862: Apuntes sobre la provincia litoral de Loreto, Tipografía Nacional (Imp. Manuel D. Cortés), Lima
- 1864: Análisis de las aguas termales de Yura, aguas minerales de Jesús y aguas potables de Arequipa, Imp. Francisco Ibáñez, Arequipa
- 1873: El departamento de Ancachs y sus riquezas minerales, Enrique Meiggs (Imp. "El Nacional" por Pedro Lira), Lima
- 1873: La manipulación del guano, Imprenta del Estado, Lima
- 1873: Manipulación del guano, Imp. "El Nacional", Lima
- 1874: Guano y salitre. Observaciones a la memoria del sr. d. Daniel Desmaison, La Opinión Nacional, Lima
- 1874: El Perú. Parte Preliminar (Tomo I), Imprenta del Estado, Lima
- 1875: Observaciones al dictámen de los señores Cisneros y García en la cuestión relativa al salitre, Imp. de "La Opinión Nacional", Lima
- 1876: El Perú. Historia de la Geografía del Perú (Tomo II), Imprenta del Estado, Lima
- 1878: Minerales del Perú o catálogo razonado de una colección que representa los principales tipos minerales de la República, con muestras de huano y restos de aves que lo han producido, Imprenta del Estado, Lima
- 1880: El Perú. Historia de la Geografía del Perú (Tomo III), Imprenta del Estado, Lima
- 1880: Apéndice al catálogo razonado de los minerales del Perú, Imp. Prince y Bux, Lima
- 1882: Aguas minerales del Perú, J. Galland y E. Henriod (Imp. C. Prince), Lima
- 1883: Minas de oro de Carabaya, Carlos Paz Soldán, Lima
- 1884: Aguas potables del Perú, F. Masías y C^{ía}, Lima
- 1885: Memoria sobre el Cerro de Pasco y la montaña de Chanchamayo, Imp. de La Merced (Peter Bacigalupi y C^{ía}), Lima
- 1887: Minas de oro del Perú, Impr. y Libr. B. Gil, Lima

=== Maps ===
- 1888: Mapa del Perú, Grabado e Imp. Erhard Frères, Paris

=== Posthumous publications ===
- 1902: Estudios geológicos del camino entre Lima y Morococha y alrededores de esta hacienda, Impr. y Libr. de San Pedro, Lima
- 1929: El Perú. Itinerarios de viajes, Banco Italiano de Lima (Imp. Torres Aguirre), Lima
- 1942: Notas de Viaje para su obra "El Perú" (Primer Volumen), Ing. Alberto Jochamowitz (Imp. Torres Aguirre), Lima
- 1943: Notas de Viaje para su obra "El Perú" (Segundo Volumen), Ing. Alberto Jochamowitz (Imp. Torres Aguirre), Lima
- 1955: 50 láminas inéditas de iconografía vegetal, Asociación Educacional Italiana, Lima
- 1990: Epistolario de Antonio Raimondi, Asociación Educacional Antonio Raimondi, Lima
- 1991: Apreciaciones personales. Cartas a Miguel Colunga (1859-1868), Biblioteca Nacional del Perú, Lima

=== Translations ===
- 1878: Minéraux au Pérou. Catalogue raisonné d'une collection des principaux types minéraux de la République comprenant aussi des échantillons de guano et des derbis fossilisés des oiseaux qui l'ont produit, A. Chaix et C^{ie} (Imp. Centrale des Chemins de Fer), Paris

== Works related to Antonio Raimondi ==
- 1966: Viajes por el Perú (por Jorge Guillermo Llosa ), Editorial Universitaria, Lima
- 2005: Antonio Raimondi, mirada íntima del Perú. Epistolario, 1849-1890, Fondo Editorial del Congreso del Perú & Banco Central de Reserva del Perú, Lima

== See also ==
- Raimondi Stela
- Puya raimondii
- El Perú
