= La Libertad District =

Coordinates: 9°37′59″S 77°45′00″W

La Libertad
- District
- Interactive map of La Libertad
- Country: Peru
- Region: Ancash
- Province: Huaraz
- Founded: November 11, 1907
- Capital: Cajamarquilla

Government
  - Mayor: Didi Raul Maguiña Salazar

Area
  - Total: 164.26 km^{2} (63.42 sq mi)
- Elevation: 3,300 m (10,800 ft)

Population (2005 census)
  - Total: 1,359
  - Density: 8.273/km^{2} (21.43/sq mi)
- Time zone: UTC-5 (PET)
- UBIGEO: 020107

La Libertad District is one of twelve districts of the province Huaraz in Peru.

== Climate ==
Climate data for Cajamarquilla, La Libertad, elevation 2,985 m (9,793 ft), (1991–2020)
Month	Jan	Feb	Mar	Apr	May	Jun	Jul	Aug	Sep	Oct	Nov	Dec	Year
Mean daily maximum °C (°F)	21.5 (70.7)	20.0 (68.0)	19.2 (66.6)	21.2 (70.2)	22.2 (72.0)	23.8 (74.8)	23.8 (74.8)	24.1 (75.4)	22.3 (72.1)	22.6 (72.7)	22.0 (71.6)	20.7 (69.3)	22.0 (71.5)
Mean daily minimum °C (°F)	5.3 (41.5)	5.3 (41.5)	5.4 (41.7)	5.6 (42.1)	5.2 (41.4)	5.4 (41.7)	5.8 (42.4)	5.6 (42.1)	4.9 (40.8)	5.3 (41.5)	5.0 (41.0)	5.3 (41.5)	5.3 (41.6)
Average precipitation mm (inches)	149.6 (5.89)	189.8 (7.47)	254.4 (10.02)	114.1 (4.49)	14.1 (0.56)	1.0 (0.04)	1.0 (0.04)	0.4 (0.02)	16.3 (0.64)	89.9 (3.54)	77.3 (3.04)	116.2 (4.57)	1,024.1 (40.32)
Source: National Meteorology and Hydrology Service of Peru
