= Huayan District =

Coordinates: 9°52′09″S 77°20′00″W

Huayan Wayan
- District
- Interactive map of Huayan
- Country: Peru
- Region: Ancash
- Province: Huarmey
- Founded: December 21, 1907
- Capital: Huayan

Government
  - Mayor: José Antonio Minaya Palacios

Area
  - Total: 58.99 km^{2} (22.78 sq mi)
- Elevation: 2,706 m (8,878 ft)

Population (2005 census)
  - Total: 1,157
  - Density: 19.61/km^{2} (50.80/sq mi)
- Time zone: UTC-5 (PET)
- UBIGEO: 021104

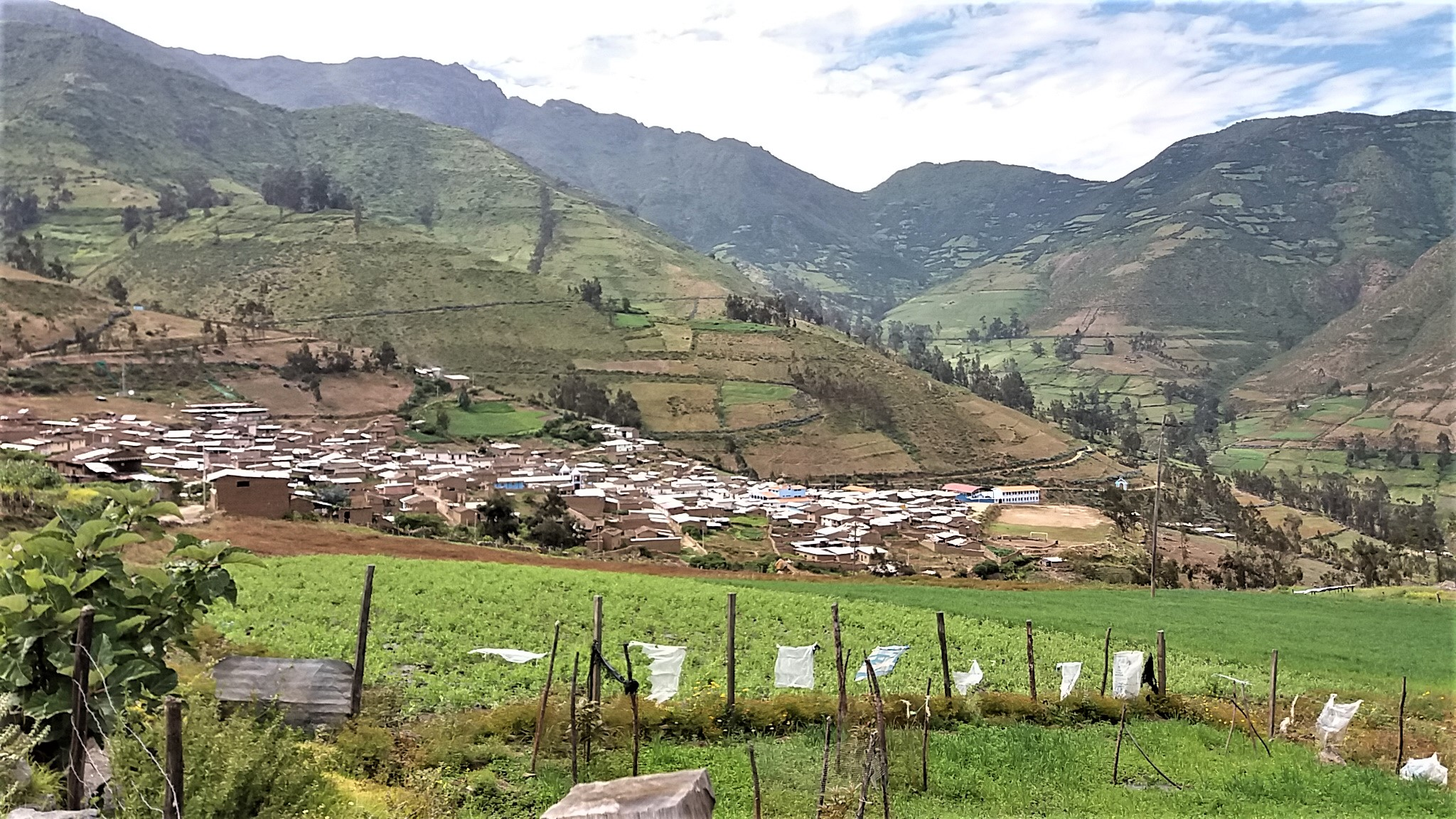
Town of Huayán

Huayan District is one of five districts of the province Huarmey in Peru.

== See also ==
- Pillaka
- Ututu Hirka
