= El Perú (book) =

19th century book by Antonio Raimondi

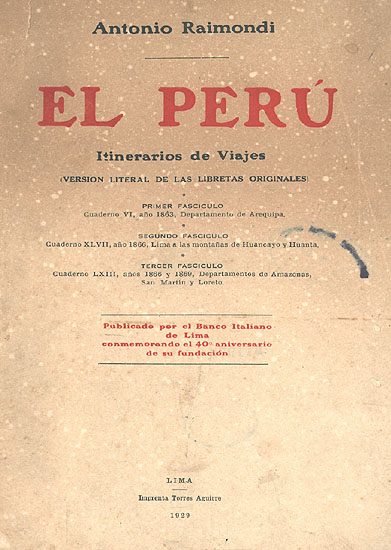
Title page of a 1929 edition of El Perú

El Perú: Itinerarios de Viajes is an expansive written work covering a variety of topics in the natural history of Peru, written by the prominent Italian-born Peruvian geographer and scientist Antonio Raimondi in the latter half of the 19th century. The work was compiled from extensive and detailed notes Raimondi took while criss-crossing the country, studying the nation's geography, geology, meteorology, botany, zoology, ethnography, and archaeology; El Perú focuses to some extent on each of these topics and others. The first volume was published in 1874; several more volumes were published both before Raimondi's death and posthumously from his notes, the last being released in 1913, making a five volume set. The volumes are a classic example of exploration scholarship, and form one of the earliest and broadest scientific reviews of Peru's natural and cultural heritage.
