= Culebras District =

Coordinates: 9°52′59″S 78°06′00″W

Culebras
- District
- Interactive map of Culebras
- Country: Peru
- Region: Ancash
- Province: Huarmey
- Founded: December 20, 1984
- Capital: La Caleta Culebras

Government
  - Mayor: Victor Celestino Del Valle Rea

Area
  - Total: 630.79 km^{2} (243.55 sq mi)
- Elevation: 5 m (16 ft)

Population (2005 census)
  - Total: 2,894
  - Density: 4.588/km^{2} (11.88/sq mi)
- Time zone: UTC-5 (PET)
- UBIGEO: 021103

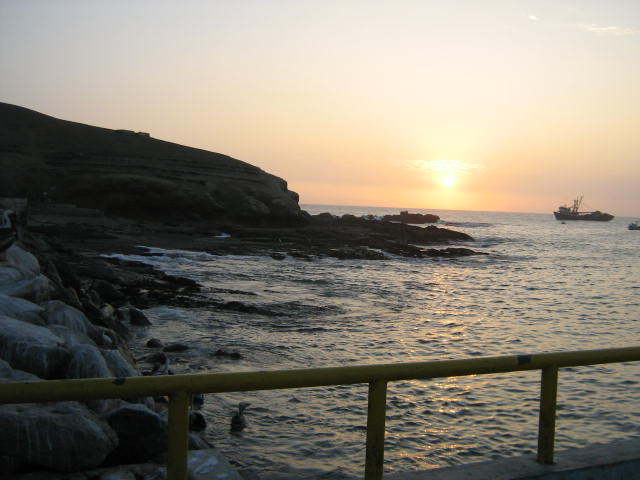

Culebras District is one of five districts of the province Huarmey in Peru.

== See also ==
- Ancash Region
- Huarmey Province
