= Huanchay District =

Coordinates: 8°58′01″S 78°04′01″W

Huanchay Wanchay
- District
- Interactive map of Huanchay
- Country: Peru
- Region: Ancash
- Province: Huaraz
- Founded: October 16, 1933
- Capital: Huanchay

Government
  - Mayor: Dioscorides Felix León Fernandez

Area
  - Total: 209.34 km^{2} (80.83 sq mi)
- Elevation: 2,591 m (8,501 ft)

Population (2005 census)
  - Total: 3,144
  - Density: 15.02/km^{2} (38.90/sq mi)
- Time zone: UTC-5 (PET)
- UBIGEO: 020104

Huanchay District is one of twelve districts of the province Huaraz in Peru.
