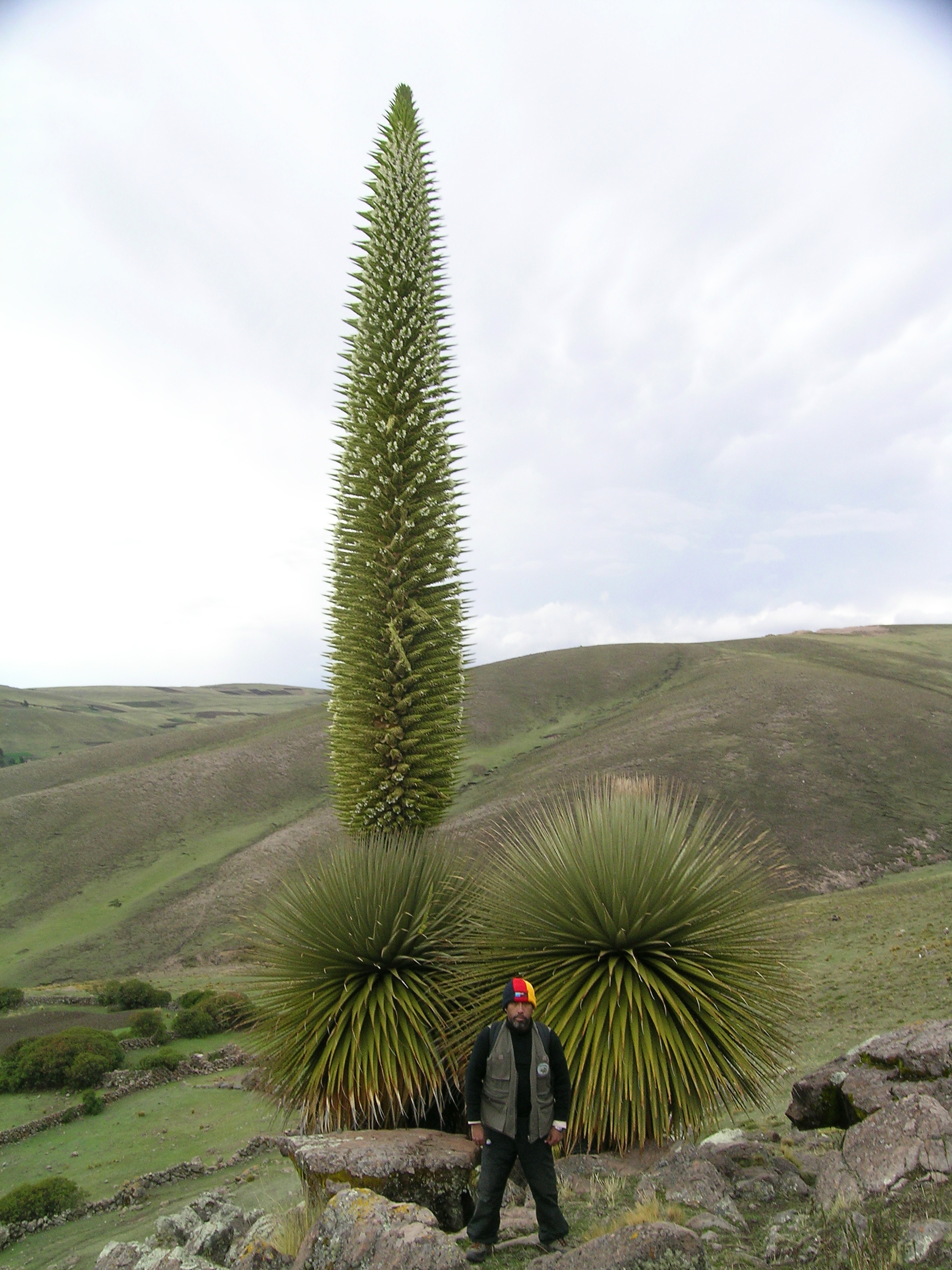
- Puya raimondii flowering in Ayacucho, Peru.

Conservation status
- Endangered (IUCN 3.1)

Scientific classification
- Kingdom: Plantae
- Clade: Tracheophytes
- Clade: Angiosperms
- Clade: Monocots
- Clade: Commelinids
- Order: Poales
- Family: Bromeliaceae
- Genus: Puya
- Species: P. raimondii

Binomial name
- Puya raimondii Harms

Synonyms
- Pourretia gigantea Raimondi

= Puya raimondii =

Queen of the Andes

Species of plant

Puya raimondii, also known as the Queen of the Andes (English), titanka and ilakuash (Quechua) or puya de Raimondi (Spanish), is the largest species of bromeliad, its inflorescences reaching up to 15 m (50 ft) in height. It is native to the high Andes of Bolivia and Peru.

== Taxonomy ==
The first scientific description of this species was made in 1830 by the French scientist Alcide d'Orbigny after he encountered it in the region of Vacas, Cochabamba, in Bolivia at an altitude of 3,960 m (12,990 ft). However, as the plants he saw were immature and not yet flowering, he could not classify them taxonomically.

The species name of raimondii commemorates the 19th-century Italian scientist Antonio Raimondi, who immigrated to Peru and made extensive botanical expeditions there. He encountered this species in the region of Chavín de Huantar and published it as new to science under the name Pourretia gigantea in his 1874 book El Perú. In 1928, the name was changed to Puya raimondii by the German botanist Hermann Harms, as the combination Puya gigantea was already used for a Chilean species.

Genetic analysis firmly places Puya raimondii in subgenus Puya within the larger genus Puya.

=== Names ===
In English Puya raimondii is known as Queen of the Andes. In the Quechua language it is known variously as titanka, ilakuash, puya, kara, tikatika, santun, qishqi, puwa, t'ikanka, or chukiqayara. The name titanka is widespread across both Peru and Bolivia in the Puna, though the names ti-ka-tika, ccara, and santón are also widely used. In the Huambo District, Caylloma in Peru, it is known as huanka while in three villages of Cotahuasi District it is more usually called pitancas. Two more names, Cuncush and Cunco, are used by locals in the Department of Ancash.

== Description ==
The queen of the Andes is the largest species of bromeliad. Its trunk can be 4 meters (13 ft) tall and 60 centimeters (2 ft) in diameter, though more often they are 1 to 2 m (3.3 to 6.6 ft) and covered in old leaves. The trunk is topped by a dense rosette of leaves, each between 1–1.25 m (3–4 ft) long and about 9 cm (4 in) in width. The upper sides of the leaves are green while their undersides are lepidote, covered with small scurfy scales, making them white in color. The edges of the leaves are widely serrated with stiff, dark brown spines, each about 1 cm long.

The inflorescence is typically 4 to 5 meters (13 to 16 ft) tall, but can measure as much as 8 m (26 ft) tall. The stem supporting the flowering stem is quite thick, with a diameter of 20 to 40 cm (8 to 16 in) and is just 60 to 90 cm (24 to 35 in) tall. When flowering the whole plant may reach as much as 15 m (50 ft), though more typically they are between 8.3 m (27 ft) and 9.5 m (31 ft) in height. Antonio Raimondi estimated the number of blooms as over 8,000 while Anthony Huxley estimated their number at 20,000. They are produced over several months starting in May or June and continuing as late as mid-December, though the floral spike will have reached its maximum size by October.

The individual flowers have greenish-white petals that are often somewhat purple. The petals are 6–8 cm long and curve to a bluntly pointed end. Each flower has three petals and three sepals. The sepals are lanceolate, shaped like the head of a spear with a pointed tip and 4 cm long.

The seeds ripen over the following months and are ready to be spread by the following July. As soon as the seeds are ripe, the gigantic plant dies completely. Estimates by Asunción Cano and co-authors are that each plant may produce 12 million seeds. They are contained in round to egg-shaped capsules that are 2.5–3 cm long. The seeds are quite small, each one including the wing around its edge is just 3–5 millimeters across. The fruiting stalk is quite rich in resins and therefore the plants burn quite readily.

Its reproductive cycle (and life) in its native habitat lasts 40 to 100 years, though one individual planted near sea level at the University of California Botanical Garden, bloomed in August 1986 after only 28 years. It is monocarpic, a plant that dies after reproduction. Unlike all other bromeliads, it does not reproduce vegetatively and is entirely dependent on the recruitment of a new generation from its seeds.

The plant has been identified to form a close relationship with pollinating birds, and was even hypothesized to be a protocarnivorous plant due to its abilities to ensnare birds in the spiny fronds. However, the adaptations seen in Puya that lead to ensnarement of birds seems most likely to be instead a defense mechanism.

== Ecology ==
The Queen of the Andes' habit of semelparity, reproducing once and dying shortly afterwards, has evolved independently in very distantly related organisms. In plants, this monocarpic strategy is quite common with annual and biennial plants being short-lived examples, but it is a much rarer strategy for long-lived plants. Other species with unbranched rosettes like Puya raimondii have been known to evolve this trait.

Both hummingbirds and perching birds visit the flowers for nectar. The black metaltail hummingbird (Metallura phoebe) lives in the stands of this and other puyas high in the Andes, though its nests have only rarely been observed and not in the crown of Puya raimondii. The black-winged ground dove (Metriopelia melanoptera) and the Ash-breasted sierra finch (Phrygilus plebejus) have both been observed nesting the crown of the plant, though this is occasionally dangerous with the ground dove occasionally becoming trapped by the spines. Birds as large as the American barn owl (Tyto furcata) have lost their lives in puyas.

== Distribution and habitat ==
P. raimondii is native to the Andes of Bolivia and Peru, usually between 2,400–4,200 m (7,900–13,800 ft) of elevation, but with a few instances of plants growing at elevations as high as 4,460 m (14,630 ft). The species grows on both rocky and shrubby slopes in the wet Páramo, tropical montane steppe, and the humid montane forest. This species seems to be very specialist on site conditions as it prefers to grow in small areas even if the surrounding terrain may seem equally suitable, resulting in a patchy distribution of P. raimondii stands. Moreover, despite being a high altitude plant, it has thrived at near sea level in a temperate climate.

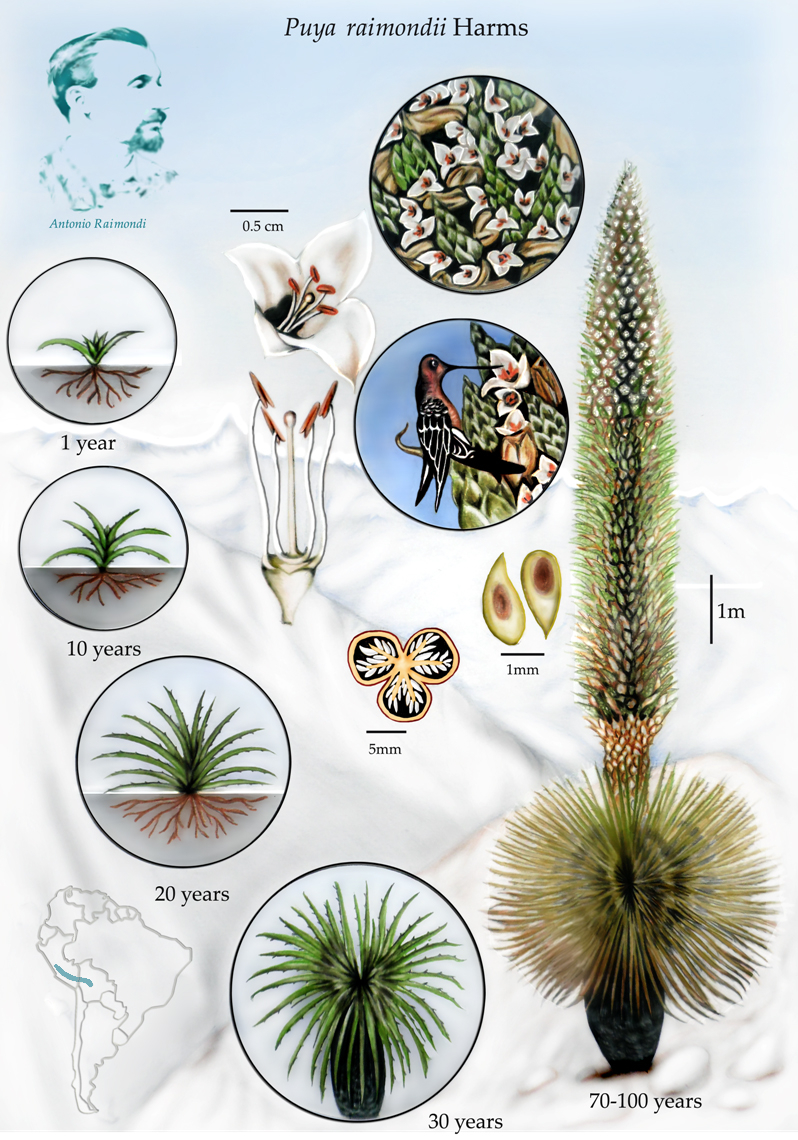
Life cycle of Puya raimondii.

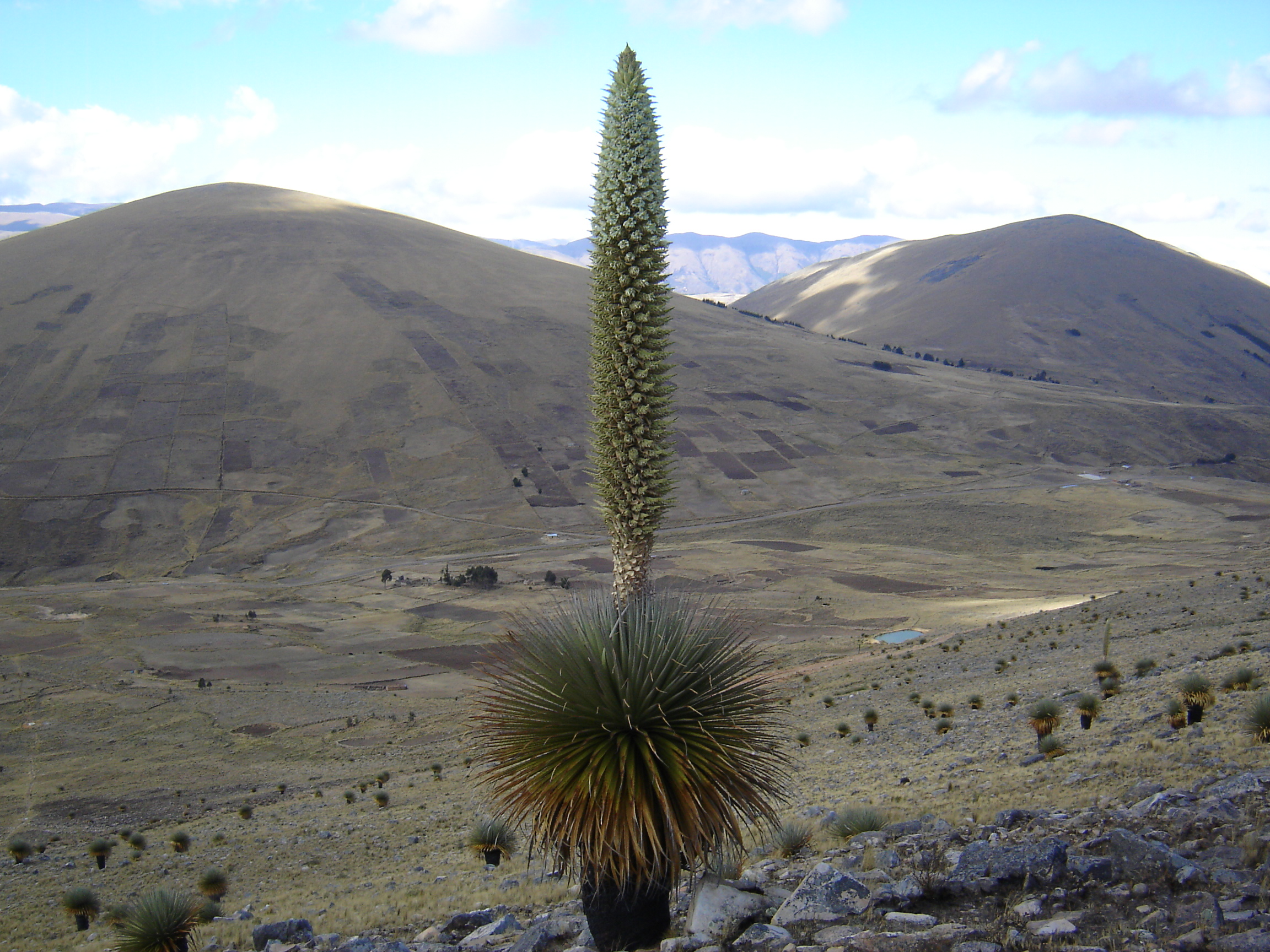
Habitat in Vacas, Cochabamba, Bolivia.

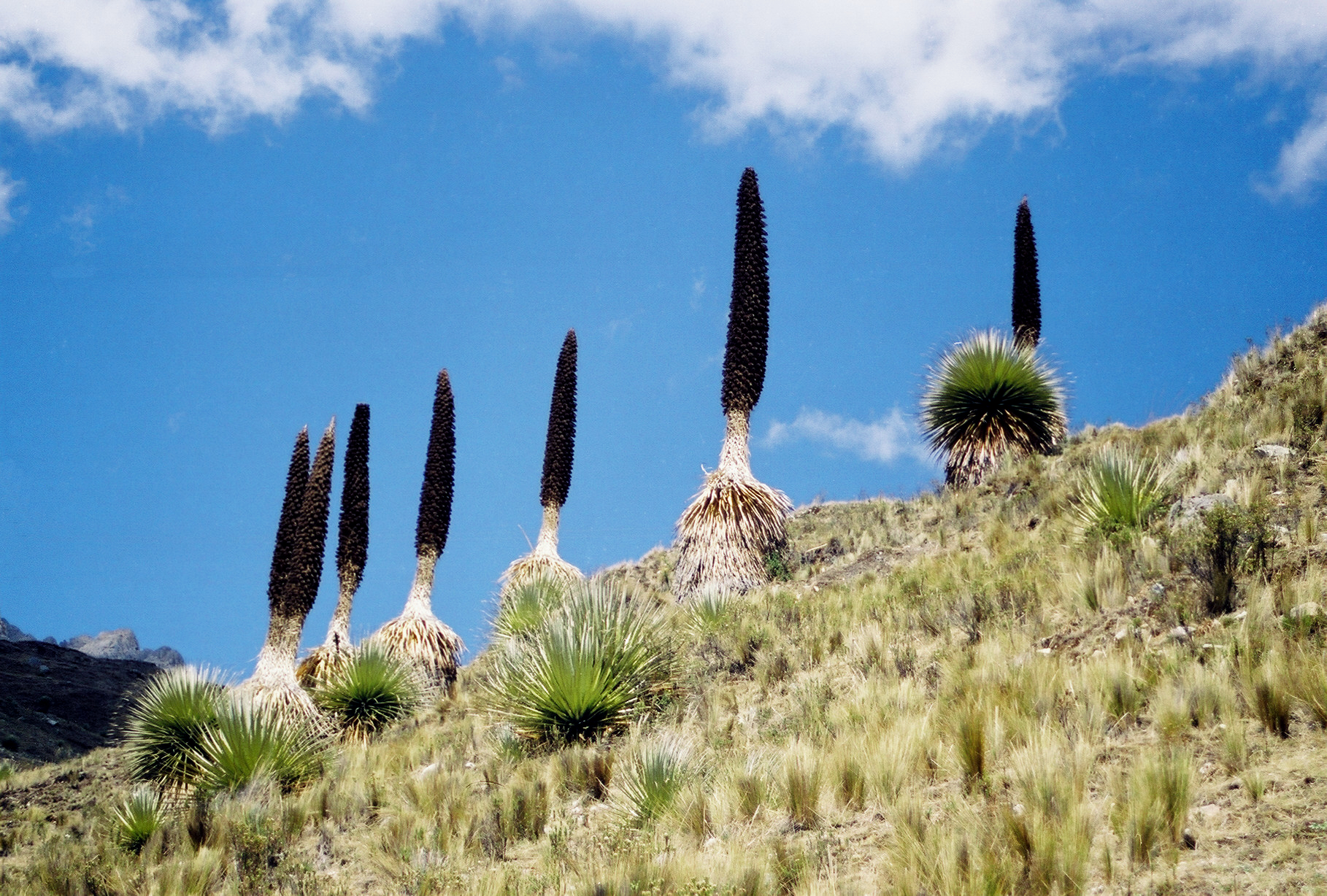
Habitat in Ancash, Peru

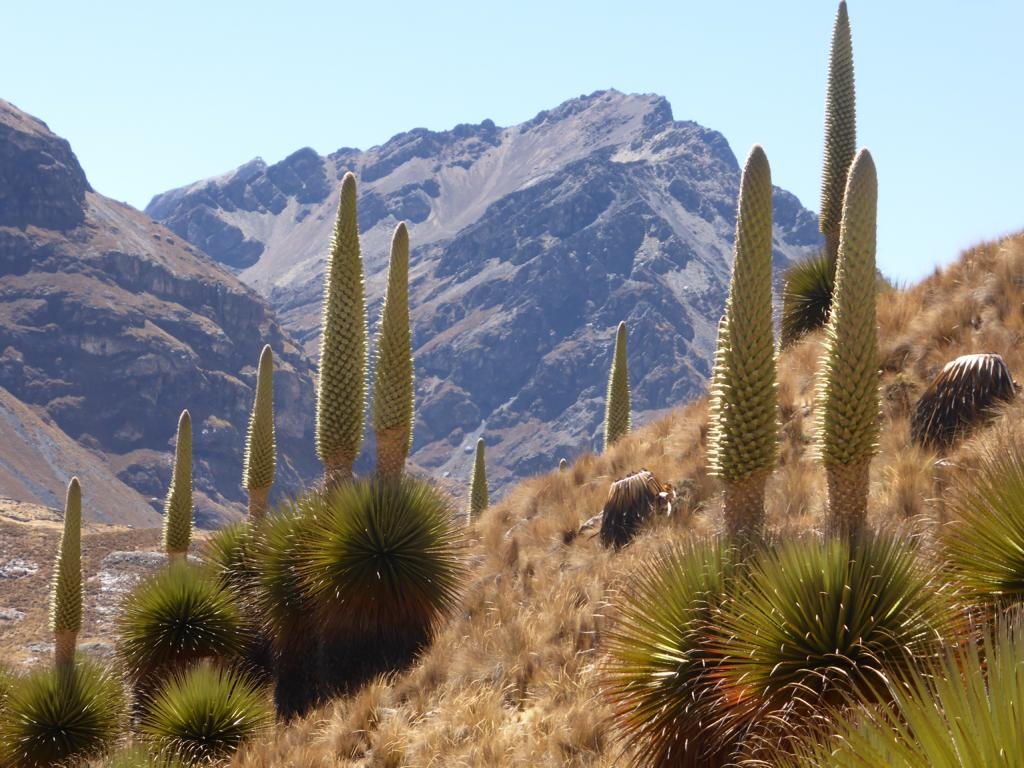
Habitat in Huascarán National Park

== Conservation status ==
P. raimondii is considered an endangered species by the IUCN. The main threats to its survival are: human-caused fires, climate change, and a declining genetic diversity.

== Gallery ==
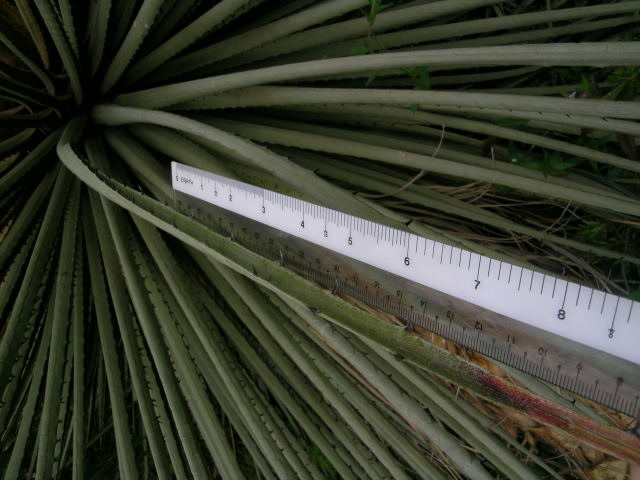
Leaves

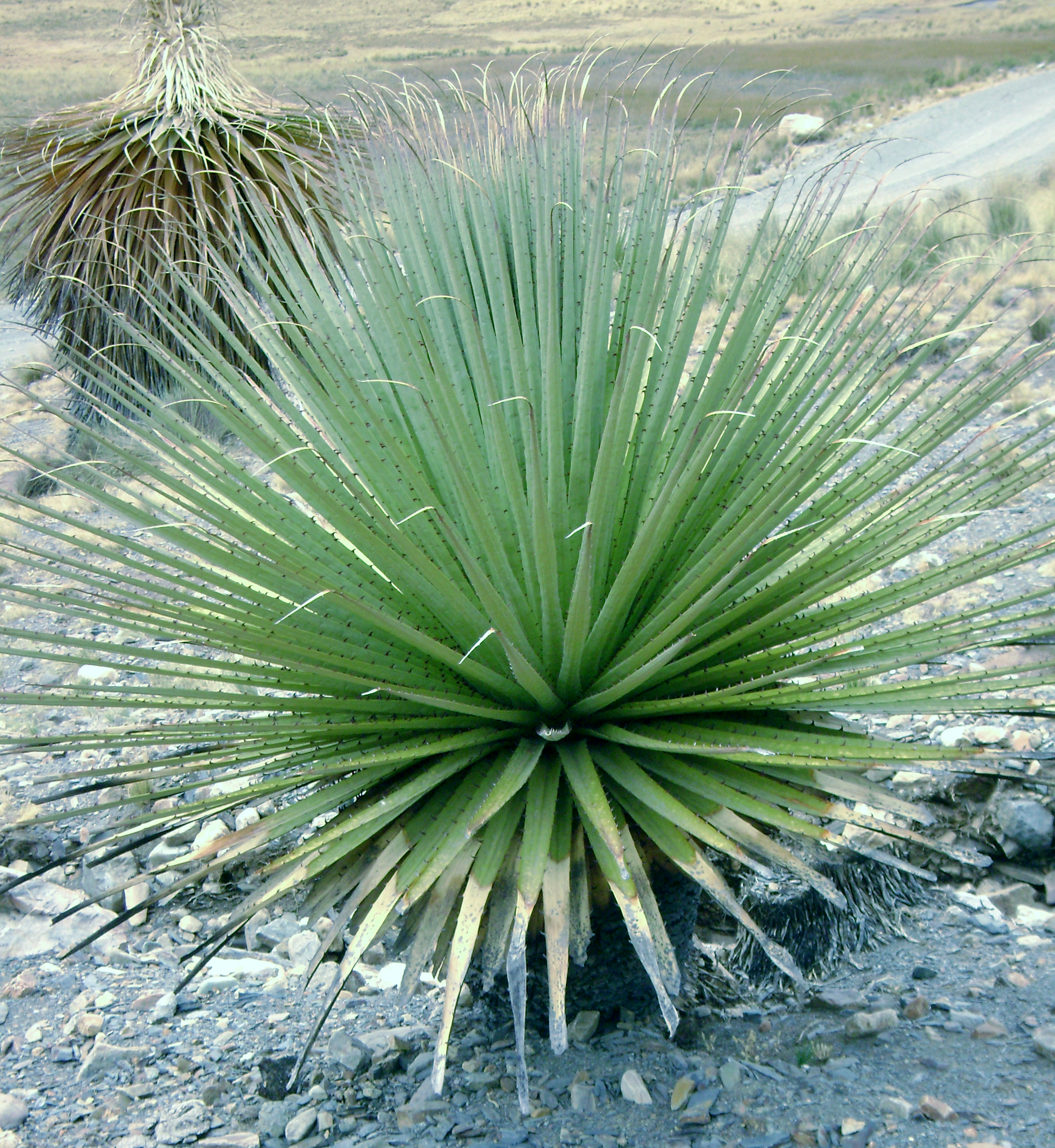
Plant

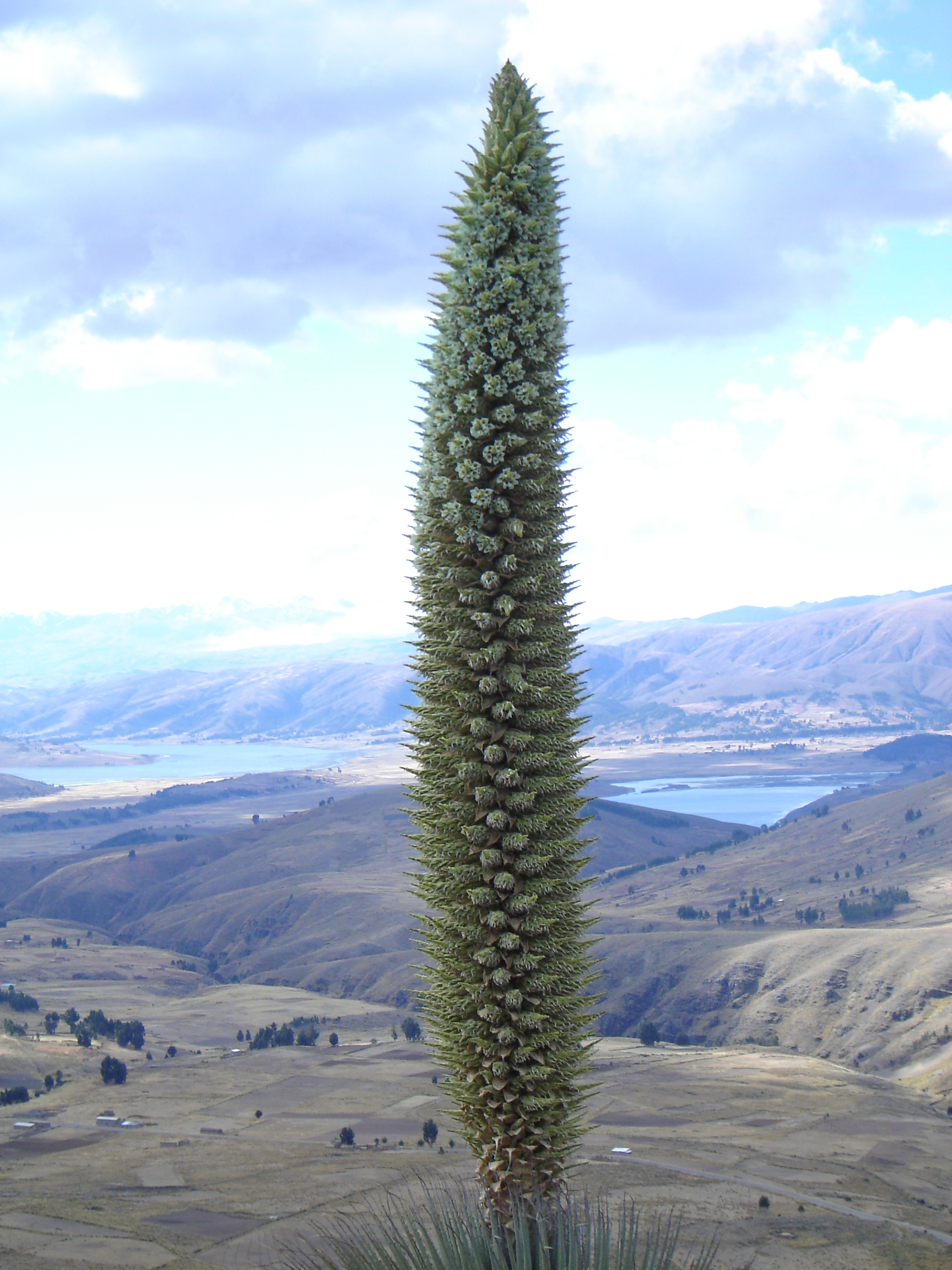
Inflorescence

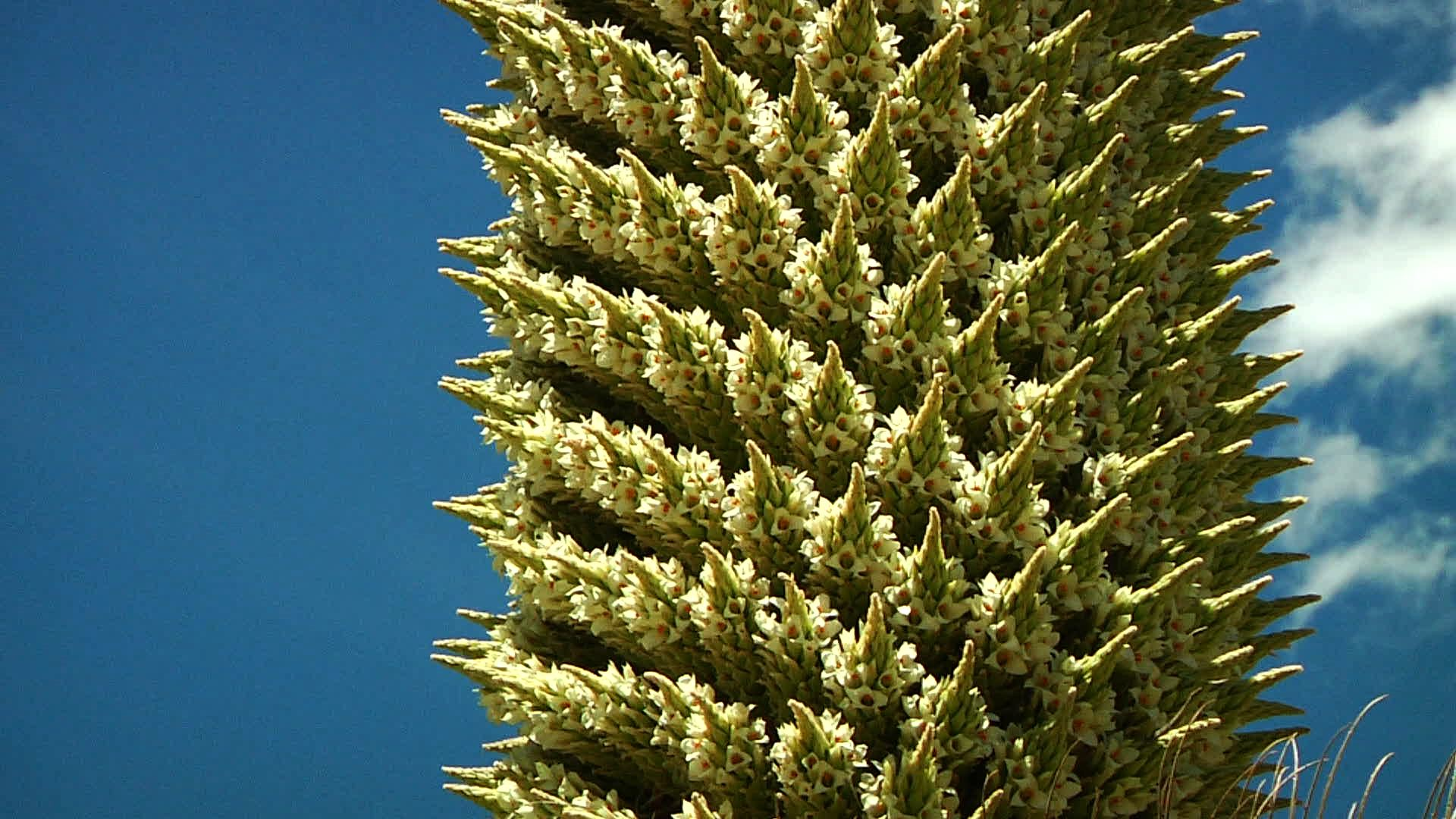
Inflorescence closeup

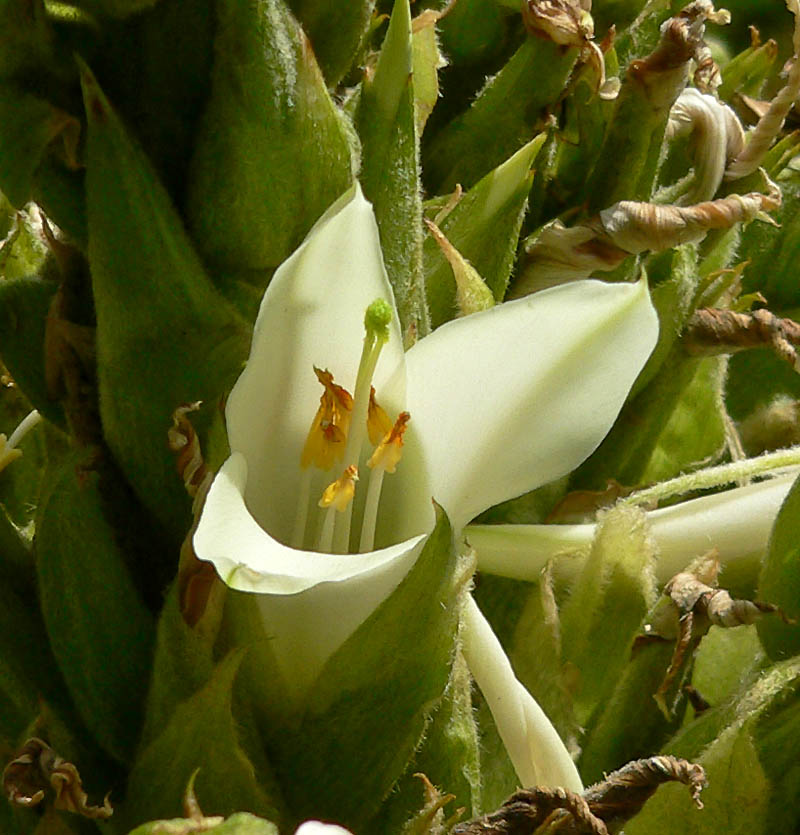
Close-up of flower.

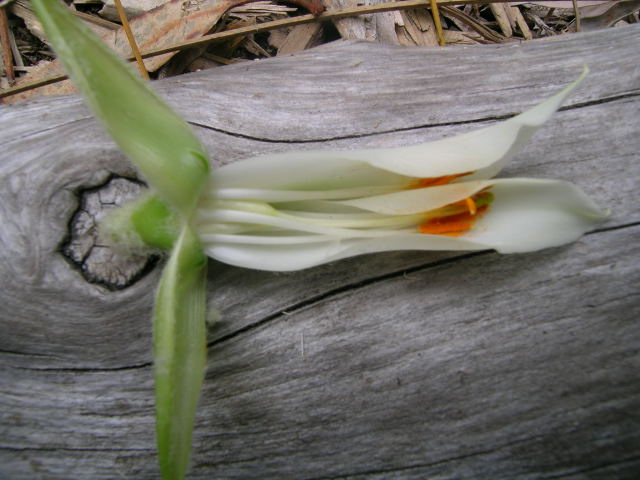
Flower dissection

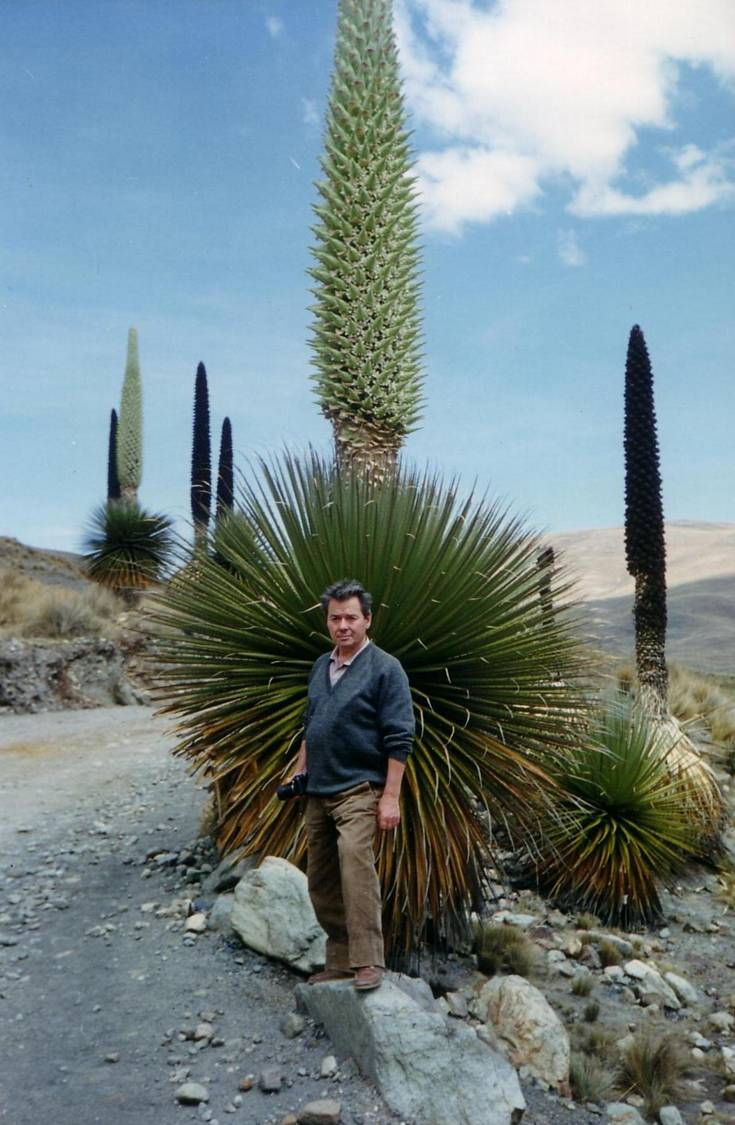
with Italian botanist Luigi Piacenza
