= Qiwlla Hirka =

Mountain in Peru

- Location within Peru

Highest point
- Elevation: 5,000 m (16,000 ft)
- Coordinates: 9°53′59″S 77°11′25″W

Geography
- Location: Peru, Ancash Region
- Parent range: Andes, Cordillera Blanca

Qiwlla Hirka (Ancash Quechua qiwlla, qillwa, qiwiña gull, hirka mountain, "gull mountain", Hispanicized spelling Jeulla Jirca) is a mountain in the southern part of the Cordillera Blanca in the Andes of Peru, about 5,000 m (16,000 ft) high. It is located in the Ancash Region, Recuay Province, Catac District. Qiwlla Hirka lies northeast of Qiwllarahu and Challwa, near Pastu Ruri.

The Pumapampa (Pachaqutu) River originates near the mountain. It is a right affluent of the Santa River.

== See also ==
- Quñuqqucha
