= Pumahuaín (Recuay) =

Mountain in Peru

- Location within Peru

Highest point
- Elevation: 5,008 m (16,430 ft)
- Coordinates: 9°50′26″S 77°16′51″W

Geography
- Location: Peru, Ancash, Recuay Province, Catac District
- Parent range: Cordillera Blanca

Pumahuaín (possibly from Quechua puma cougar, puma, Ancash Quechua wayi house, "cougar house", -n a suffix) is a 5,008-metre-high (16,430 ft) mountain in the southern part of the Cordillera Blanca in the Andes of Peru. It is situated in the Ancash Region, Recuay Province, Catac District. Puma Wayin lies southwest of Mururahu and Kunkush and northwest of Pukarahu.
