= Minapata =

Mountain in Peru

- Location within Peru

Highest point
- Elevation: 5,400 m (17,700 ft)
- Coordinates: 9°57′06″S 77°13′35″W

Geography
- Location: Peru, Ancash Region
- Parent range: Andes, Cordillera Blanca

Minapata (Spanish mina mine, Quechua pata elevated place; above, at the top; edge, bank (of a river), shore) is a mountain in the southern part of the Cordillera Blanca in the Andes of Peru, about 5,400 m (17,700 ft) high . It is located in the Ancash Region, Bolognesi Province, Aquia District, and in the Recuay Province, Catac District. Minapata lies south of Challwa and northeast of Qiwllarahu.

== See also ==
- Quñuqqucha
