= Tuco (mountain) =

Mountain in Peru

- Tuku, Huanaco Punta
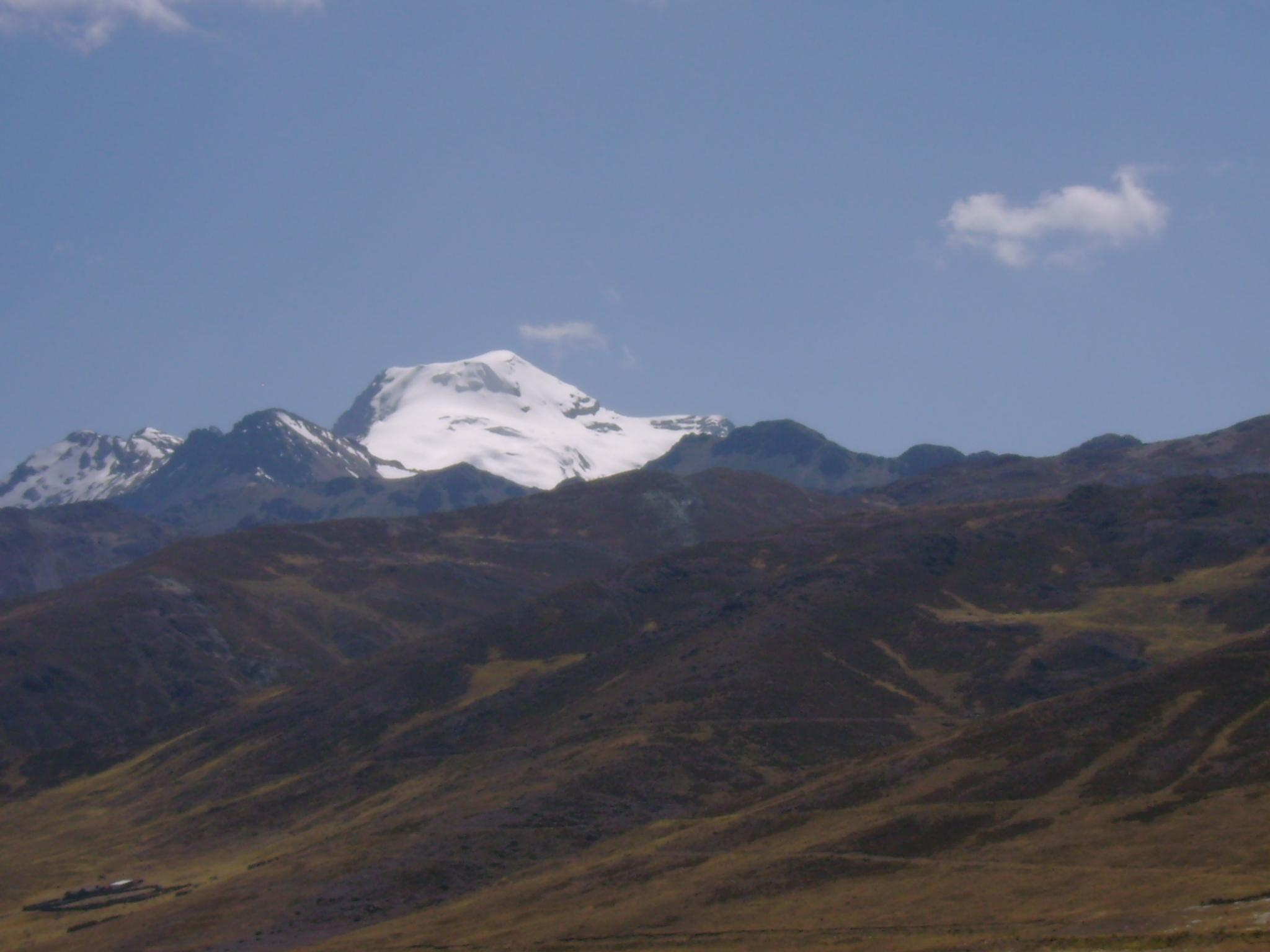
- Tuco

Highest point
- Elevation: 5,479 m (17,976 ft)
- Coordinates: 9°55′27″S 77°11′57″W

Geography
- Location within Peru
- Location: Peru, Ancash Region
- Parent range: Cordillera Blanca

Climbing
- First ascent: 1-1963 via N.W. slopes

Tuco, Tuku, Tucu (possibly from Quechua tuku, owl) or Huanaco Punta (possibly from Quechua wanaku guanaco and Spanish punta peak, ridge; first, before, in front of) is a mountain in the Andes in South America. Its summit is 5,479 m (17,976 ft)) high and it is one of the southernmost peaks in the snow-capped Cordillera Blanca in northwestern central Peru. Tuco is located in the Ancash Region, Bolognesi Province, Aquia District and in the Recuay Province, Catac District. It is situated northeast of Caullaraju, between Challhua in the west and Pastoruri in the east.

Other neighboring peaks are Juchuraju or Condorjitanca (5,392 m (17,690 ft)) and Santón (5,100 m (16,700 ft)). Raju Cutac (5,355 m (17,569 ft)) is the only peak further south in the Cordillera Blanca.

A stream also named Tuco originates near the mountain and flows out to lakes Aguashcocha and Conococha, at the headwaters of Santa River.
