= Tantash =

Mountain in Peru

- Location within Peru

Highest point
- Elevation: 5,504 m (18,058 ft)
- Coordinates: 9°50′06″S 77°12′37″W

Geography
- Location: Peru, Ancash Region
- Parent range: Andes, Cordillera Blanca

Tantash is a 5,504-metre-high (18,058 ft) mountain in the Cordillera Blanca in the Andes of Peru. It is situated in the Ancash Region, Recuay Province, Catac District. Tantash lies southeast of Mururaju and east of Pukarahu.
