= Cahuish =

Mountain in Peru

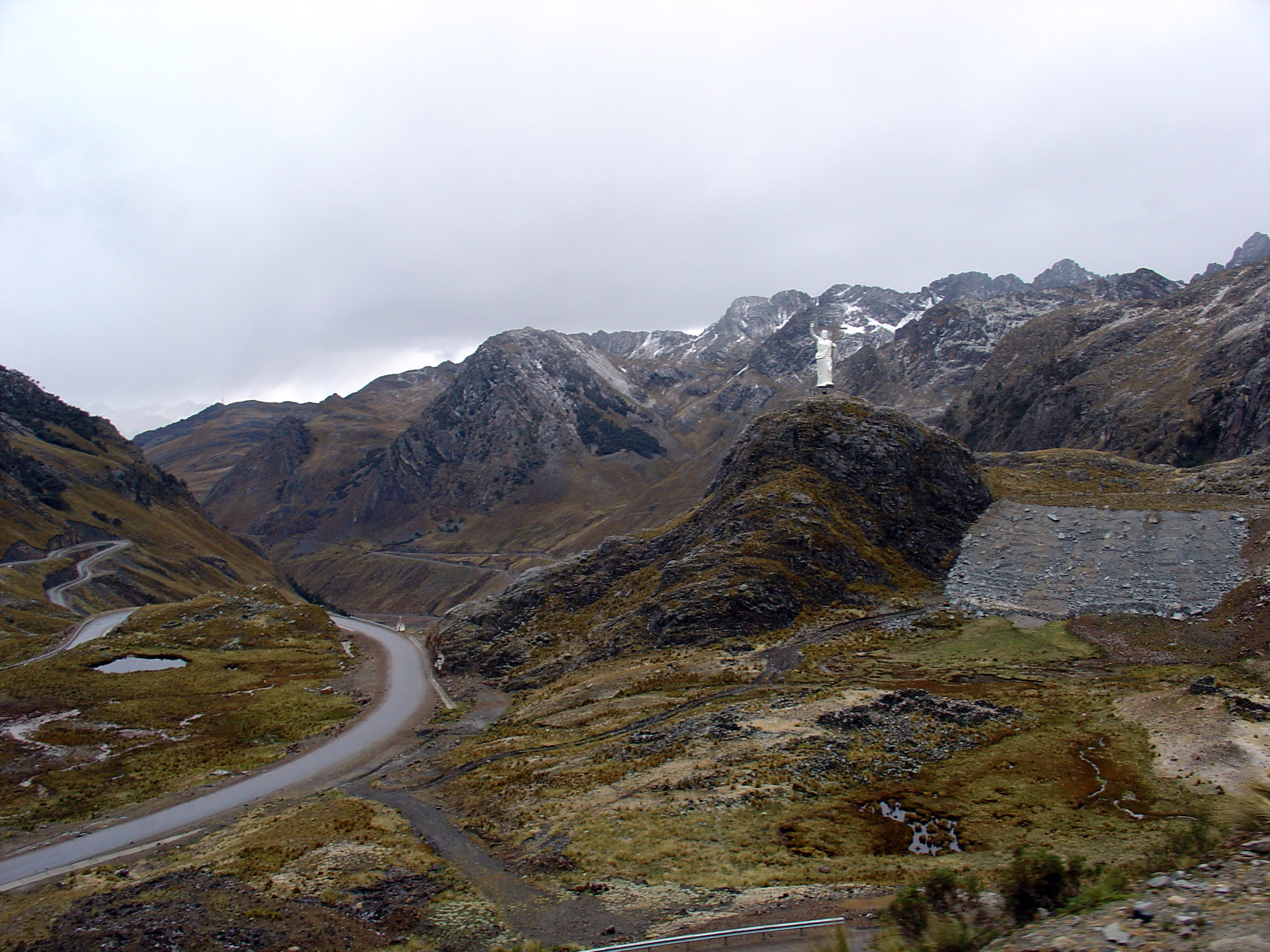
- The southern slope of Cahuish(on the left) at the road above Qiruqucha

Highest point
- Elevation: 4,900 m (16,100 ft)
- Coordinates: 9°40′47″S 77°14′58″W

Geography
- Location within Peru
- Location: Ancash, Peru
- Parent range: Cordillera Blanca

Cahuish (possibly from Quechua qawi put into the sun) is a mountain in the Cordillera Blanca in the Andes of Peru, about 4,900 metres (16,076 ft) high. It is situated in the Ancash Region, Huari Province, Chavin de Huantar District, and in the Recuay Province, Ticapampa District. Cahuish lies southwest of the mountain and the archaeological site of Waraqayuq and southeast of Yanamarey.
