= Wishka Hirka =

Mountain in Peru

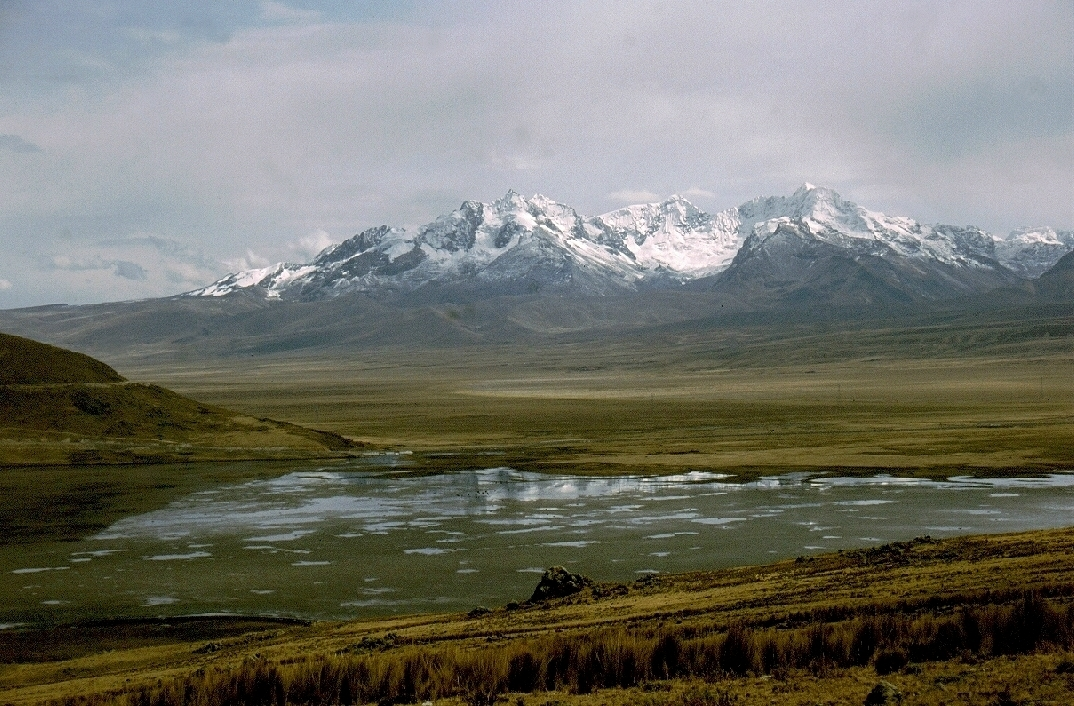
- Qiwllarahu with Wishka Hirka (on the left) and the lake Quñuqqucha in the foreground

Highest point
- Elevation: 4,934 m (16,188 ft)
- Coordinates: 9°57′58″S 77°16′48″W

Geography
- Location within Peru
- Location: Peru, Ancash Region
- Parent range: Andes, Cordillera Blanca

Wishka Hirka (Ancash Quechua wishka viscacha, hirka mountain, "viscacha mountain") or Wishpa Hirka (Ancash Quechua wishpa influenza, "influenza mountain", Hispanicized spelling Huishpajirca) is a 4,934-metre-high (16,188 ft) mountain in the southern part of the Cordillera Blanca in the Andes of Peru. It is located in the Ancash Region, Recuay Province, Catac District. Wishka Hirka lies southwest of Qiwllarahu.

== See also ==
- Quñuqqucha
