= Ichic Jeulla =

Mountain in Peru

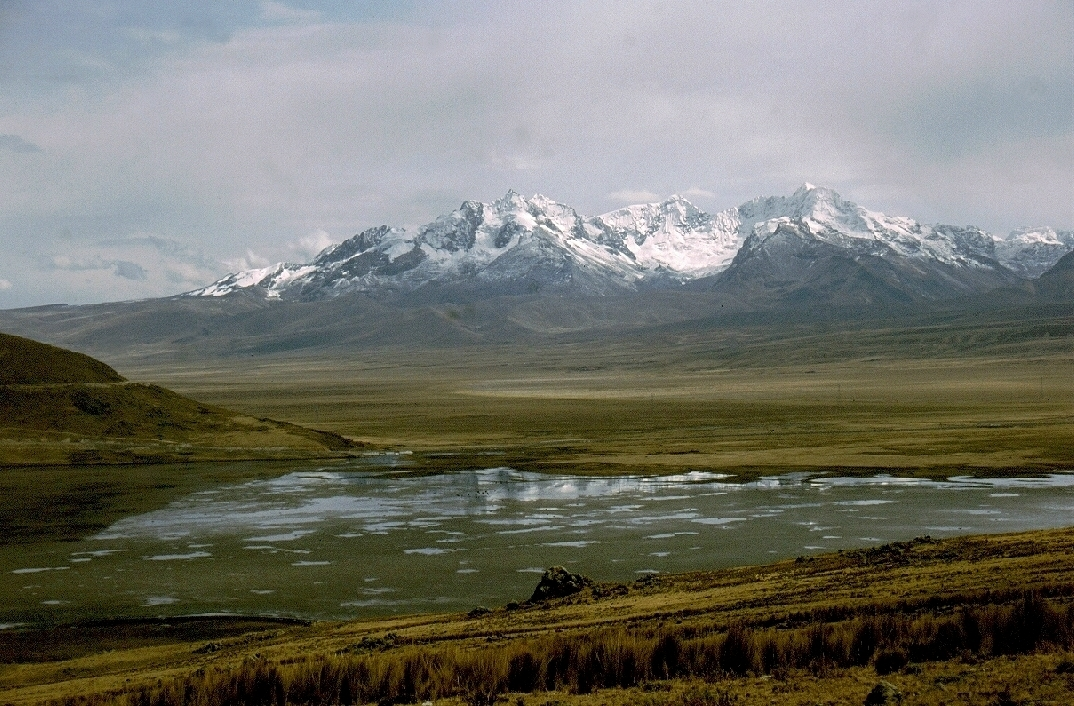
- Caullaraju and Ichic Jeulla as seen from Lake Conococha

Highest point
- Elevation: 5,091 m (16,703 ft)
- Coordinates: 9°58′50″S 77°14′31″W

Geography
- Location within Peru
- Location: Peru, Ancash Region
- Parent range: Andes, Cordillera Blanca

Ichic Jeulla (possibly from Ancash Quechua ichik small, little, few, qiwlla, qillwa, qiwiña gull) is a 5,091-metre-high (16,703 ft) mountain in the southern part of the Cordillera Blanca in the Andes of Peru. It is located in the Ancash Region, Recuay Province, Catac District. Ichic Jeulla lies southeast of Caullaraju.

== See also ==
- Lake Conococha
