= Pukarahu (disambiguation) =

Pukarahu or Puka Rahu (Quechua puka red, rahu snow peak, "red snow peak", Hispanicized spellings Pucarajo, Pucaraju) may refer to:

- Another name for Santa Cruz, a mountain in the Santa Cruz District, Huaylas Province, Ancash Region, Peru
- Pukarahu (Bolognesi-Huari), a mountain on the border of the Bolognesi Province and the Huari Province, Ancash Region, Peru
- Pukarahu (Catac), a mountain in the Catac District, Recuay Province, Ancash Region, Peru
- Pukarahu (Huari), a mountain in the Huari Province, Ancash Region, Peru
- Pukarahu (Lucma), a mountain in the Lucma District, Mariscal Luzuriaga Province, and in the Llumpa District, Pomabamba Province, Ancash Region, Peru
- Pucaraju (Ticapampa), a mountain in the Ticapampa District, Recuay Province, Ancash Region, Peru
