= Challhua =

Mountain in Peru

- Wiksu, Huicsu
- Location within Peru

Highest point
- Elevation: 5,487 m (18,002 ft)
- Coordinates: 9°55′15″S 77°13′23″W

Geography
- Location: Peru, Ancash Region
- Parent range: Cordillera Blanca

Climbing
- First ascent: 1-1959 via N.W. ridge.

Challhua (possibly from Quechua for "fish"), Wiksu or Huicsu (both names possibly from Quechua for "twisted, bent") is a mountain in the southern Cordillera Blanca in the Andes of Peru, about 5,487 m (18,002 ft) high (IGN Peru map cites an elevation of 5,476 m (17,966 ft)). Challhua is located in the Ancash Region, Bolognesi Province, Aquia District and in the Recuay Province, Catac District. It is situated northeast of Caullaraju, west of Pastu Ruri and Tuco and south of Santun. One of the nearest places is the village of Wicso, located next to Callan creek, west of the mountain. This creek flows to the Pumapampa River, a right affluent of the Santa River.
