= Tuco =

Tuco may refer to:

== People and fictional characters ==
- El Tuco, Mauricio Alfaro (born 1956), Salvadoran footballer and coach
- Tuco Ramirez, a character played by Eli Wallach in the 1966 Italian film The Good, the Bad and the Ugly
- Tuco Salamanca, a character played by Raymond Cruz in the Breaking Bad franchise
- Tuco, Ariel Ngueukam, Cameroonian footballer

== Other ==
- Tuco (mountain), a summit in the mountain range Cordillera Blanca, Peru

== See also ==
- Tuco-tuco, a species of South American rodent
