= Kunkush Punta =

Mountain in Peru

- Location within Peru

Highest point
- Elevation: 4,907 m (16,099 ft)
- Coordinates: 9°43′04″S 77°17′41″W

Geography
- Location: Peru, Ancash, Recuay Province, Catac District
- Parent range: Cordillera Blanca

Kunkush Punta (Ancash Quechua kunkush Puya raimondii, punta peak; ridge; first, before, in front of, Hispanicized spelling Cuncushpunta) is a 4,907-metre-high (16,099 ft) mountain in the southern part of the Cordillera Blanca in the Andes of Peru. It is situated in the Ancash Region, Recuay Province, Catac District. Kunkush Punta lies east of Qiruqucha.
