= Catac District =

Coordinates: 9°48′00″S 77°26′13″W

Catac
- District
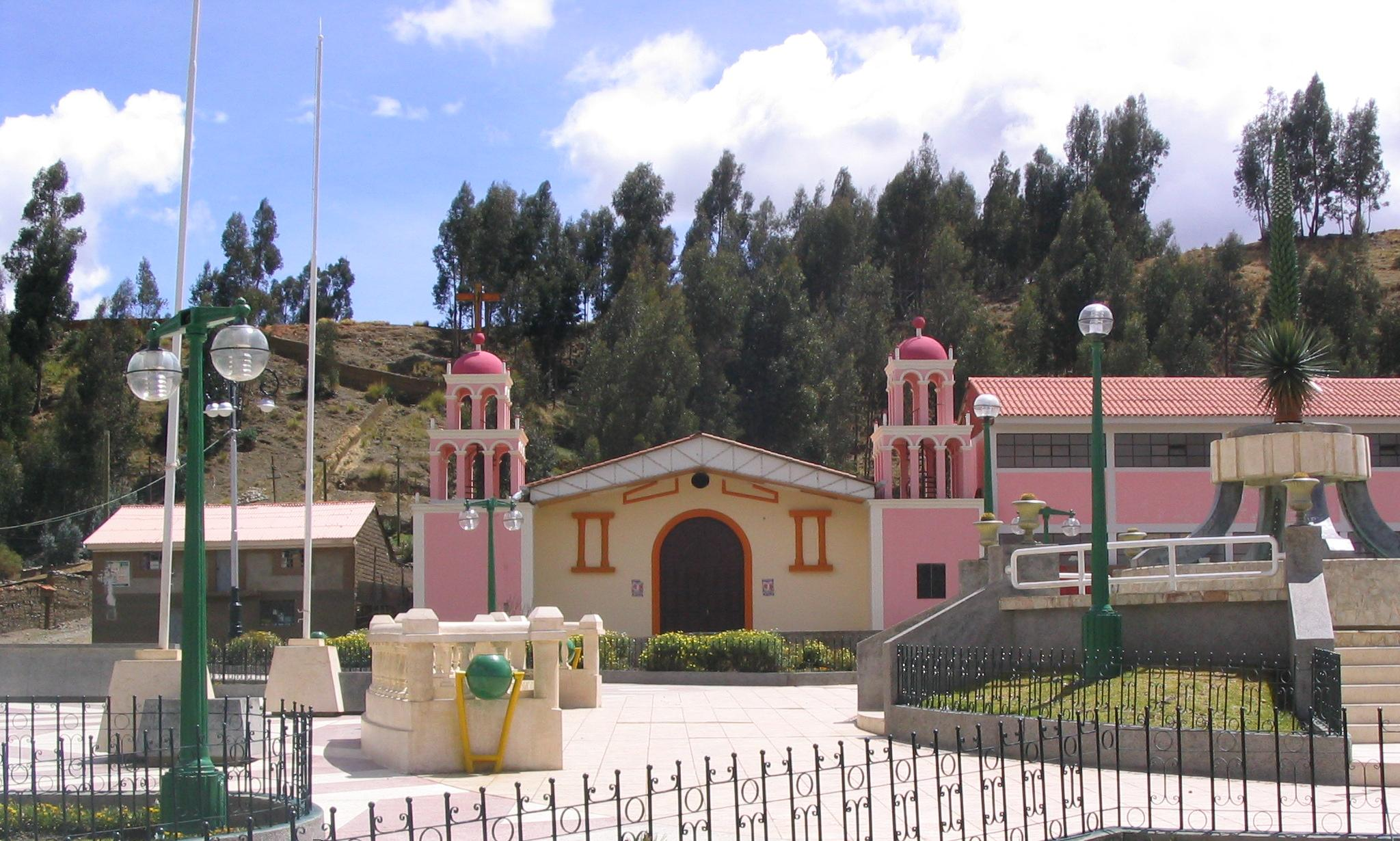
- Catac
- Interactive map of Catac
- Country: Peru
- Region: Ancash
- Province: Recuay
- Founded: January 8, 1965
- Capital: Catac

Area
  - Total: 1,018.27 km^{2} (393.16 sq mi)
- Elevation: 3,566 m (11,699 ft)

Population (2005 census)
  - Total: 4,616
  - Density: 4.533/km^{2} (11.74/sq mi)
- Time zone: UTC-5 (PET)
- UBIGEO: 021702

Catac District is one of ten districts of the Recuay Province in Peru. Its seat is Catac.

== Geography ==
The southern part of the Cordillera Blanca traverses the district. Some of the highest peaks of the district are listed below:

- Challwa
- Chuqi Wank'a
- Ichik Qiwlla
- Kunkush
- Kunkush Punta
- Kuntur Sinqa
- Kuntur Wayin
- Minapata
- Mururahu
- Pukarahu
- Puma Wayin
- Puywan
- Qarwaq
- Qishqi
- Qiwlla Hirka
- Qiwllarahu
- Sach'a Hirka
- Santun
- Shawanka Punta
- Tantash
- Tuku
- Wamas Chakra
- Warapaska
- Wathiyaqucha
- Wishka Hirka
- Yana Kunkush

== See also ==
- Kiswar
- Qiruqucha
- Qishqiqucha
