= Kuntur Wayin (Recuay) =

Mountain in Peru

- Location within Peru

Highest point
- Elevation: 4,200 m (13,800 ft)
- Coordinates: 09°59′52″S 77°21′58″W

Geography
- Location: Peru, Ancash Region
- Parent range: Andes, Cordillera Negra

Kuntur Wayin (Quechua: kuntur, "condor"; Ancash Quechua: wayi house, "condor house", -n a suffix, also spelled Condorhuain) is a mountain in the Cordillera Negra in the Andes of Peru which reaches a height of approximately 4,200 m (13,800 ft). It lies in the Ancash Region, Recuay Province, Catac District. Kuntur Wayin (also spelled Condor Huain) is also the name of an intermittent stream which originates west of the mountain. It is a left affluent of the Santa River.
