= Ticapampa District =

Coordinates: 9°50′03″S 77°26′17″W

Ticapampa
- District
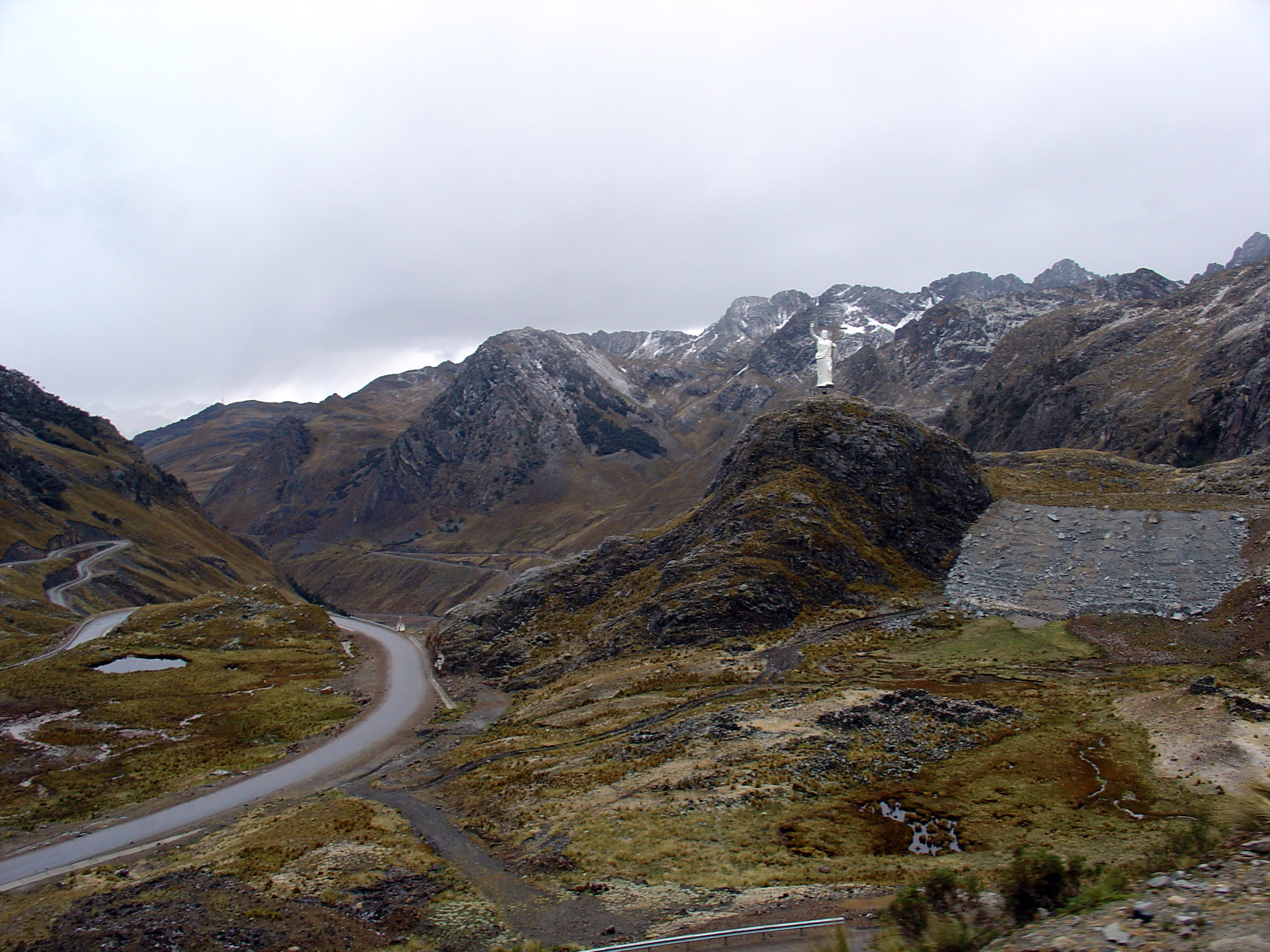
- On the road above Qiruqucha
- Interactive map of Ticapampa
- Country: Peru
- Region: Ancash
- Province: Recuay
- Founded: October 12, 1921
- Capital: Ticapampa

Area
  - Total: 142.29 km^{2} (54.94 sq mi)
- Elevation: 3,456 m (11,339 ft)

Population (2005 census)
  - Total: 2,566
  - Density: 18.03/km^{2} (46.71/sq mi)
- Time zone: UTC-5 (PET)
- UBIGEO: 021710

Ticapampa District is one of ten districts of the Recuay Province in Peru.

== Geography ==
The Cordillera Blanca and the Cordillera Negra traverse the district. Some of the highest mountains of the district are listed below:

- Khuchi Mach'ay
- Pamparahu Punta
- Puka Allpa
- Puka Mach'ay
- Pukarahu
- Qawish
- Rukutu Punta
- Tunshu
- Wank'ap'iti
- Waqra Qaqa
- Yanamaray
- Yanarahu

== See also ==
- Qiruqucha
