= Kushuru Hirka =

Mountain in Peru

- Location within Peru

Highest point
- Elevation: 4,600 m (15,100 ft)
- Coordinates: 9°56′36″S 77°29′22″W

Geography
- Location: Peru, Ancash Region
- Parent range: Andes, Cordillera Negra

Kushuru Hirka (Ancash Quechua kushuru an edible kind of seaweed, hirka mountain, "kushuru mountain", also spelled Cushuroirca) is a mountain in the Cordillera Negra in the Andes of Peru which reaches a height of approximately 4,600 m (15,100 ft). It lies in the Ancash Region, Recuay Province, on the border of the districts of Cotaparaco and Tapacocha.
