= Rocotopunta (Recuay) =

Mountain in Peru

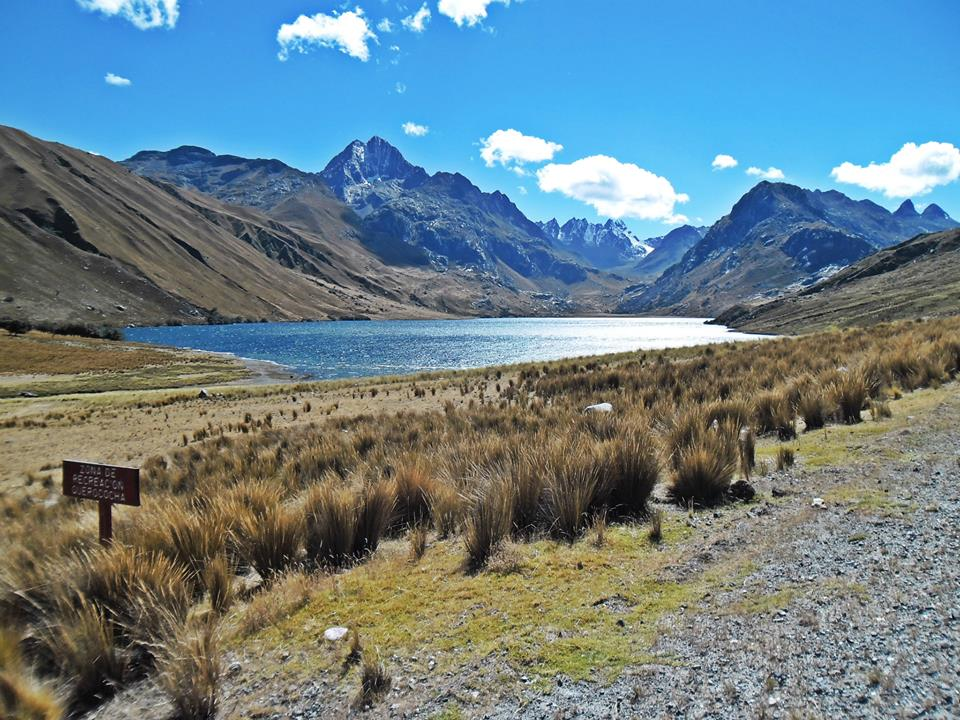
- Lake Querococha and Rocotopunta (on the right)

Highest point
- Elevation: 4,400 m (14,400 ft)
- Coordinates: 9°42′20″S 77°18′27″W

Geography
- Location within Peru
- Location: Peru, Ancash Region
- Parent range: Andes, Cordillera Blanca

Rocotopunta (Quechua rukutu, a plant (Capsicum pubescens) and Spanish punta, a peak or ridge) is a mountain in the Cordillera Blanca in the Andes of Peru, about 4,400 m (14,436 ft) high. It is located in the Ancash Region, Recuay Province, Ticapampa District, northeast of Lake Querococha. Rocotopunta lies between Yanamarey Creek to the north and Conde Creek to the south.
