= Kuntur Sinqa (Ancash) =

Mountain in Peru

- Location within Peru

Highest point
- Elevation: 4,630 m (15,190 ft)
- Coordinates: 9°48′53″S 77°18′55″W

Geography
- Location: Peru, Ancash Region
- Parent range: Andes, Cordillera Blanca

Kuntur Sinqa (Quechua kuntur condor, sinqa nose, "condor nose", also spelled Condorsencca) is a mountain in the Cordillera Blanca in the Andes of Peru, about 4,630 m (15,190 ft) high. It is situated in the Ancash Region, Recuay Province, Catac District. Kuntur Sinqa lies west of Mururahu at a lake named Qishqiqucha.
