= Kunkush =

Mountain in Peru

- Location within Peru

Highest point
- Elevation: 5,000 m (16,000 ft)
- Coordinates: 9°49′38″S 77°16′07″W

Geography
- Location: Peru, Ancash, Recuay Province, Catac District
- Parent range: Cordillera Blanca

Cuncush (Ancash Quechua for Puya raimondii) is a mountain in the southern part of the Cordillera Blanca in the Andes of Peru, about 5,000 metres (16,404 ft) high. It is situated in the Ancash Region, Recuay Province, Catac District. Cuncush lies southwest of Mururaju and northwest of Pukarahu.
