= Ichoca =

Village in Ancash region, Peru

Coordinates: 10°08′S 77°27′W

Ichoca is a small village in the Ancash Region, Peru. It has a population of 321 [2017 census] and is located in the Marca District, Recuay Province.
