= Santón =

Mountain in Peru

- Location within Peru

Highest point
- Elevation: 5,238 m (17,185 ft)
- Coordinates: 9°54′04″S 77°13′15″W

Geography
- Location: Peru, Ancash
- Parent range: Andes, Cordillera Blanca

Santón (possibly from Quechua for Puya raimondii) is a 5,238-metre-high (17,185 ft) mountain in the southern Cordillera Blanca in the Andes of Peru. It is located in the Ancash Region, Recuay Province, Catac District. It is situated northeast of Caullaraju and north of Challhua. Santón lies south of Pumapampa River, a right tributary of the Santa River.
