= Kuntur Sinqa (disambiguation) =

Kuntur Sinqa (Quechua kuntur condor, sinqa nose, "condor nose", also spelled Condor Sencca, Condor-Sencca, Condor Senja, Condor Sincca, Condorcencca, Condorcinca, Condorsencca, Condorsenga, Condorsenja, Condorsincca, Condorsinja, Condorsenqa, Cóndorsencca) may refer to:

== Mountain ==
- Kuntur Sinqa (Ancash), in the Ancash Region, Peru
- Kuntur Sinqa (Ayacucho), in the Ayacucho Region, Peru
- Kuntur Sinqa (Jauja), in the Jauja Province, Junín Region, Peru
- Kuntur Sinqa (Junín), in the Tarma Province, Junín Region, Peru
- Kuntur Sinqa (Lima), in the Lima Region, Peru
- Kuntur Sinqa (Paruro), in the Paruro Province, Cusco Region, Peru
- Kuntur Sinqa (Quispicanchi), in the Quispicanchi Province, Cusco Region, Peru

== Places ==
- Kuntur Sinqa (La Convención), a viewpoint at a mountain in the Cusco Region, Peru
