= Shahuanga Punta =

Mountain in Peru

- Location within Peru

Highest point
- Elevation: 5,161 m (16,932 ft)
- Coordinates: 9°43′33″S 77°14′13″W

Geography
- Location: Peru, Ancash Region
- Parent range: Andes, Cordillera Blanca

Shahuanga Punta (possibly from Quechua Shawanka Punta) is a 5,161-metre-high (16,932 ft) mountain in the Cordillera Blanca in the Andes of Peru. It is situated in the Ancash Region, Huari Province, Chavín de Huantar District, and in the Recuay Province, Catac District. It lies north of Queshque.
