= Wamas Chakra =

Mountain in Peru

- Location within Peru

Highest point
- Elevation: 5,409 m (17,746 ft)
- Coordinates: 9°56′52″S 77°15′30″W

Geography
- Location: Peru, Ancash Region
- Parent range: Andes, Cordillera Blanca

Wamas Chakra (Quechua chakra field, Hispanicized spelling Huamaschacra) is a 5,409-metre-high (17,746 ft) mountain in the Cordillera Blanca in the Andes of Peru. It is located in the Ancash Region, Recuay Province, Catac District. It lies in the Qiwllarahu massif.
