= Yanamarey =

Mountain in Peru

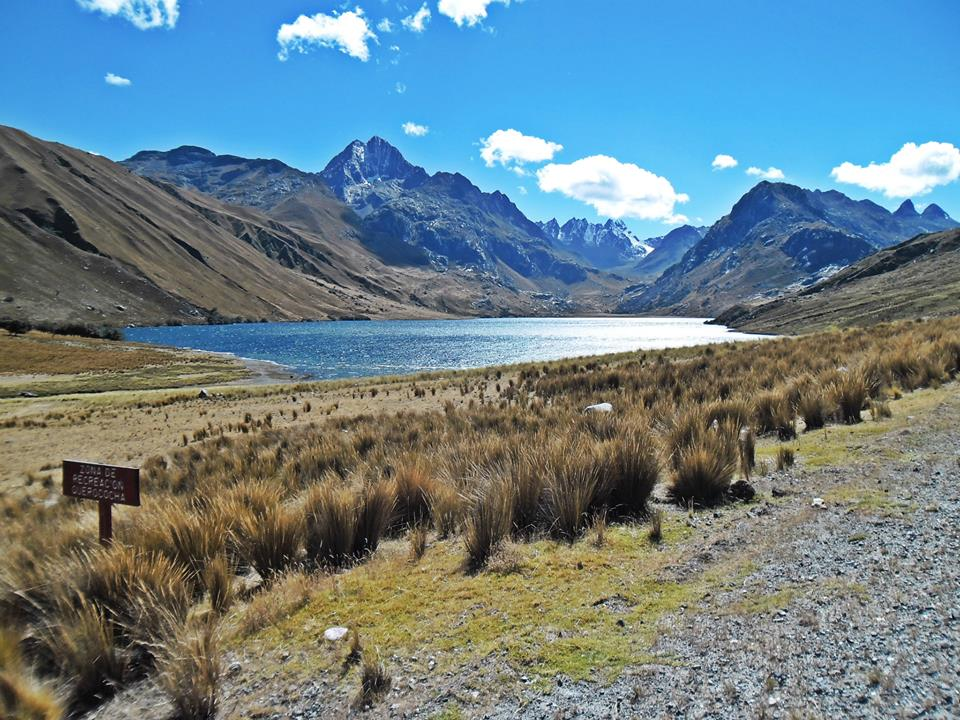
- Lake Querococha and Mount Pucaraju (center-left). In the background the Yanamarey glacier is visible.

Highest point
- Elevation: 5,237 m (17,182 ft)
- Coordinates: 9°39′40″S 77°15′40″W

Geography
- Location within Peru
- Location: Ancash, Peru
- Parent range: Cordillera Blanca

Climbing
- First ascent: Yanamarey N: 1-1967 via N. ridge. Yanamarey S: 1-1965 via S. slopes.

Yanamarey (possibly from Quechua yana black, maran, maray batan or grindstone, maray to tear down, to knock down, "black batan or grindstone") or Yanaraju is a mountain in the Cordillera Blanca in the Andes of Peru, about 5,237 metres (17,182 ft) high. It is located between Recuay and Huari provinces, in Ancash. Yanamaray lies east of Pucaraju and northeast of Lake Querococha, between Matashcu in the north and Cahuish in the south.

The Yanamaray River originates west of the mountain. It provides Qiruqucha with the melt water of the Yanamarey glacier before it empties into Santa River.

Annual observations have shown that the Yanamarey glacier has been rapidly retreating over the last years.

== See also ==
- Waraqayuq
