= Qullpa Hirka =

Mountain in Peru

- Location within Peru

Highest point
- Elevation: 4,400 m (14,400 ft)
- Coordinates: 9°52′51″S 77°31′36″W

Geography
- Location: Peru, Ancash Region
- Parent range: Andes, Cordillera Negra

Qullpa Hirka (Quechua qullpa salty, saltpeter, Ancash Quechua hirka mountain, "salty (or saltpeter) mountain", also spelled Colpa Irca) is a mountain in the Cordillera Negra in the Andes of Peru which reaches a height of approximately 4,400 m (14,400 ft). It lies in the Ancash Region, Recuay Province, in the northern part of the Cotaparaco District.
