= Izcopata =

Mountain in Peru

- Location within Peru

Highest point
- Elevation: 4,400 m (14,400 ft)
- Coordinates: 9°54′27″S 77°32′47″W

Geography
- Location: Peru, Ancash Region
- Parent range: Andes, Cordillera Negra

Izcopata (possibly from Quechua isku lime, pata step; bank of a river, "lime step (or bank)", also spelled Izcopata) is a mountain in the Cordillera Negra in the Andes of Peru which reaches a height of approximately 4,400 m (14,400 ft). It is located in the Ancash Region, Recuay Province, Cotaparaco District. Izcopata is also the name of a place southeast of the mountain.
