= Kuntur Qaqa (Ancash) =

Mountain in Peru

- Location within Peru

Highest point
- Elevation: 4,600 m (15,100 ft)
- Coordinates: 10°01′04″S 77°24′55″W

Geography
- Location: Peru, Ancash Region
- Parent range: Cordillera Negra

Kuntur Qaqa (Quechua kuntur condor, qaqa rock, "condor rock", hispanicized spelling Condorgaga) is a mountain in the Cordillera Negra in the Andes of Peru, about 4,600 metres (15,092 ft) high. It is situated in the Ancash Region, Recuay Province, Marca District.
