= Huayllapampa District =

Coordinates: 10°02′52″S 77°32′41″W

Huayllapampa Wayllapampa
- District
- Interactive map of Huayllapampa
- Country: Peru
- Region: Ancash
- Province: Recuay
- Founded: October 7, 1907
- Capital: Huayllapampa

Area
  - Total: 105.29 km^{2} (40.65 sq mi)
- Elevation: 2,889 m (9,478 ft)

Population (2005 census)
  - Total: 752
  - Density: 7.14/km^{2} (18.5/sq mi)
- Time zone: UTC-5 (PET)
- UBIGEO: 021704

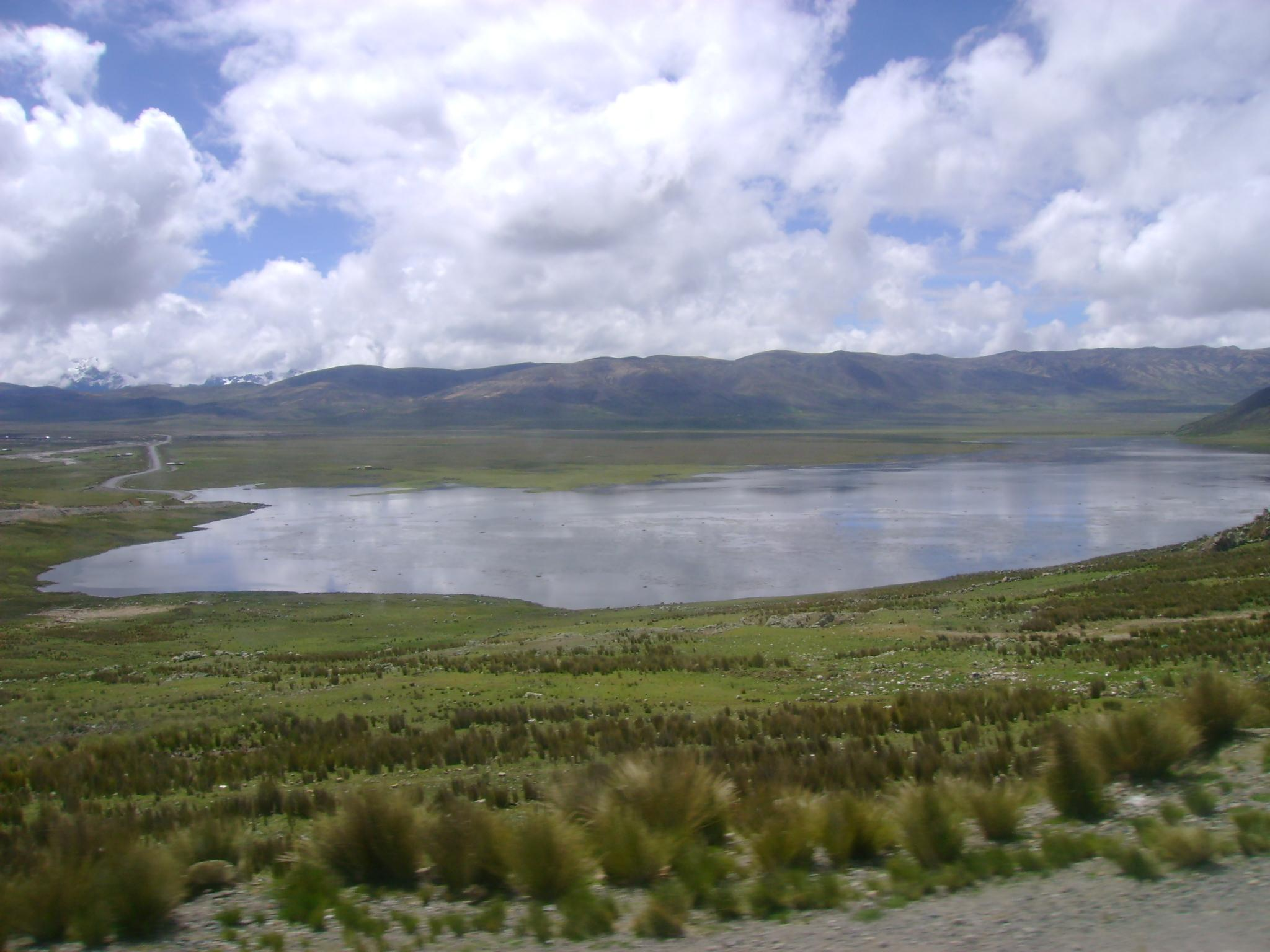
Laguna de Conococha in Huayllapampa District

Huayllapampa District is one of ten districts of the Recuay Province in Peru.

== See also ==
- Kiswar
- Puka Qaqa
- Qulluta
