= Tapacocha District =

Coordinates: 10°01′01″S 77°34′59″W

Tapacocha Tapaqucha
- District
- Interactive map of Tapacocha
- Country: Peru
- Region: Ancash
- Province: Recuay
- Founded: March 5, 1936
- Capital: Tapacocha

Area
  - Total: 81.23 km^{2} (31.36 sq mi)
- Elevation: 3,608 m (11,837 ft)

Population (2005 census)
  - Total: 483
  - Density: 5.95/km^{2} (15.4/sq mi)
- Time zone: UTC-5 (PET)
- UBIGEO: 021709

Tapacocha District is one of ten districts of the Recuay Province in Peru.

== See also ==
- Kiswar
- Kushuru Hirka
- T'uquyuq
