= Marca District =

Coordinates: 10°04′59″S 77°30′00″W

- District
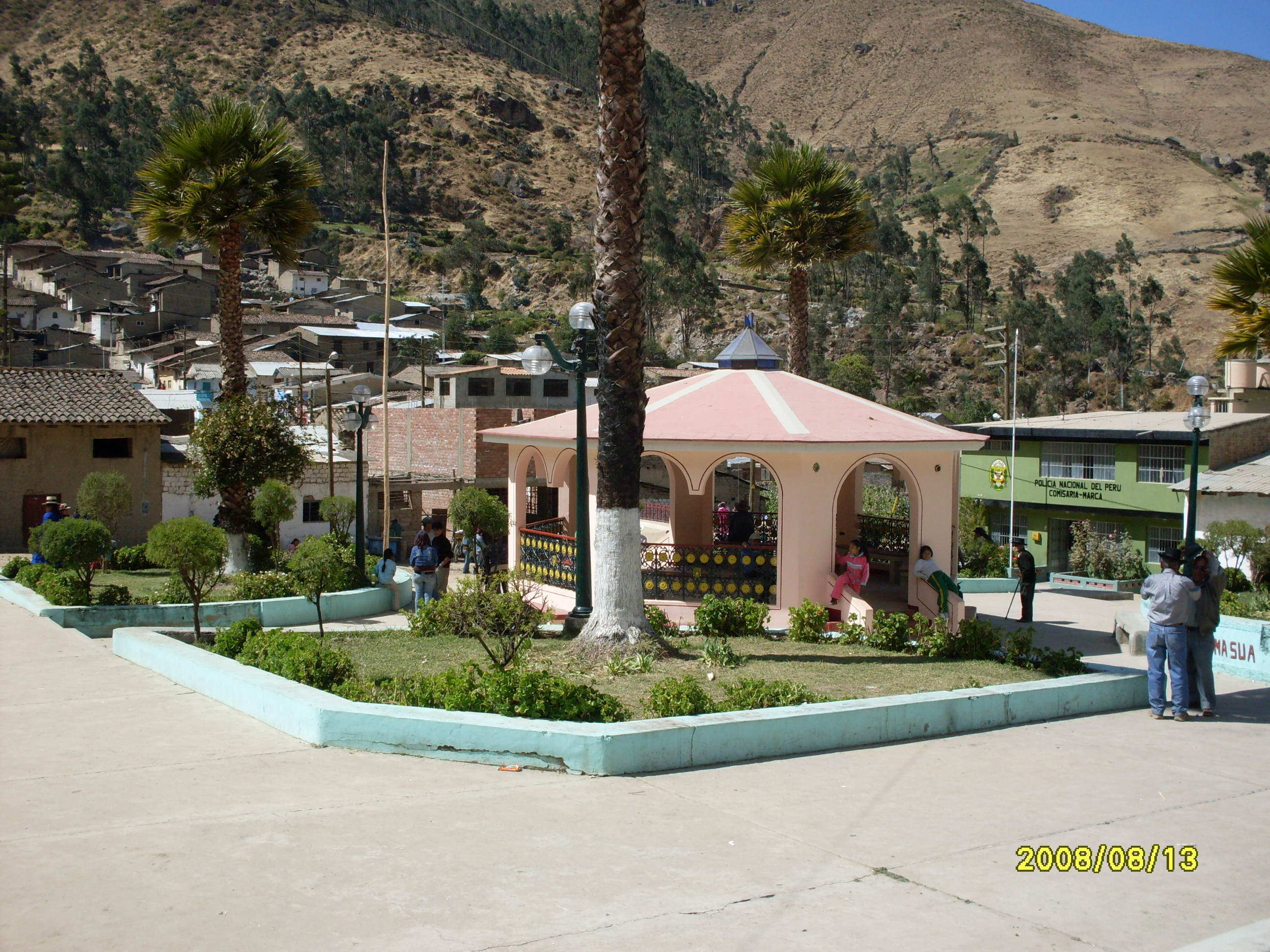
- Interactive map of Marca District
- Country: Peru
- Region: Ancash
- Province: Recuay
- Founded: January 2, 1857
- Capital: Marca

Area
  - Total: 184.84 km^{2} (71.37 sq mi)
- Elevation: 2,644 m (8,675 ft)

Population (2005 census)
  - Total: 1,111
  - Density: 6.011/km^{2} (15.57/sq mi)
- Time zone: UTC-5 (PET)
- UBIGEO: 021706

Marca District is one of ten districts of the Recuay Province in Peru.

== Localities ==
- Ichoca

== Mountains ==
- Kuntur Qaqa
- Puka Qaqa
- Qulluta
