= Hatun Machay =

Archaeological site in Peru

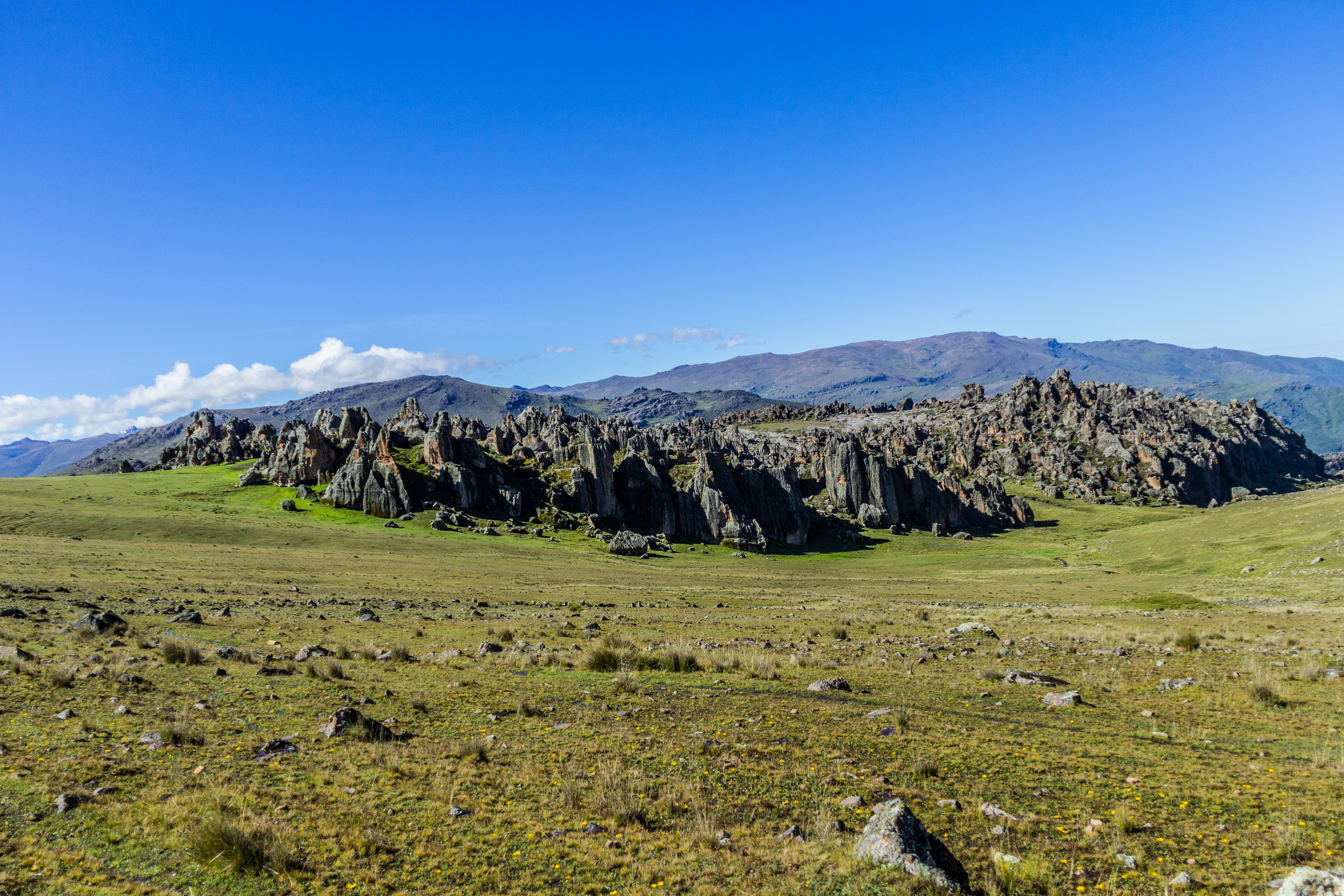
- Sunrise in Hatun Machay.

- Location within Peru
- 10°5′24″S 77°20′50″W
- Location: Peru; Ancash Region, Recuay Province

Site notes
- Height: 4,200 metres (13,780 ft)

Hatun Machay (possibly from Quechua hatun big, mach'ay cave) is a rock forest with archaeological remains in Peru. It was declared a National Cultural Heritage by Resolución Directoral No. 944/INC-2010 on May 7, 2010. Hatun Mach'ay is situated on the western side of the Cordillera Negra in the Ancash Region, Recuay Province, Pampas Chico District, at a height of about 4,200 metres (13,780 ft).
