= Cotaparaco District =

Coordinates: 10°00′S 77°36′W

Cotaparaco
- District
- Interactive map of Cotaparaco
- Country: Peru
- Region: Ancash
- Province: Recuay
- Capital: Cotaparaco

Area
  - Total: 172.85 km^{2} (66.74 sq mi)
- Elevation: 3,008 m (9,869 ft)

Population (2005 census)
  - Total: 619
  - Density: 3.58/km^{2} (9.28/sq mi)
- Time zone: UTC-5 (PET)
- UBIGEO: 021703

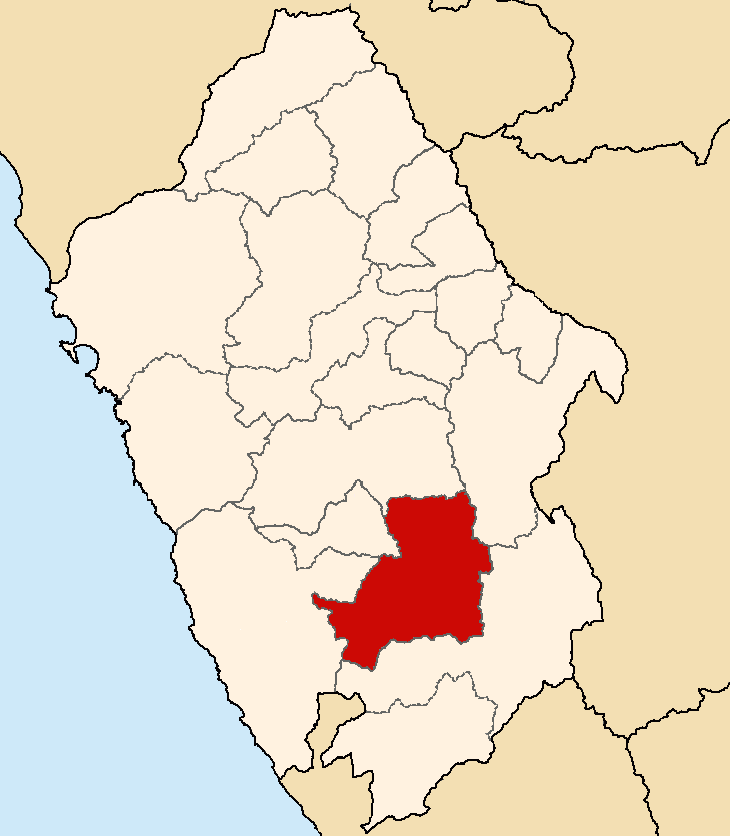
Location of the Recuay province in the Ancash region, Peru.

Cotaparaco District is one of ten districts of the Recuay Province in Peru.

== Geography ==
One of the highest peaks of the province is Kushuru Hirka at approximately 4,600 m (15,100 ft). Other mountains are listed below:

- Ayri Wank'a
- Isku Pata
- Kiswar
- Kunkush Kancha
- Pampa Kancha
- Puma Wayin
- P'ukruq
- Qullpa Hirka
- Quta Pharaku
- Yana Mach'ay
