= T'uquyuq =

Mountain in Peru

- Location within Peru

Highest point
- Elevation: 4,400 m (14,400 ft)
- Coordinates: 9°59′38″S 77°31′24″W

Geography
- Location: Peru, Ancash
- Parent range: Cordillera Negra

T'uquyuq (Quechua t'uqu a niche, hole or gap in the wall, -yuq a suffix, "the one with gaps in the wall", also spelled Tucuyoc) is a mountain in the Cordillera Negra in the Andes of Peru which reaches a height of approximately 4,400 m (14,400 ft). It lies in the Ancash Region, Recuay Province, Tapacocha District, southwest of the lake and the mountain named Yanaqucha ("black lake").
