= Puka Qaqa (Recuay) =

Mountain in Peru

- Location within Peru

Highest point
- Elevation: 4,640 m (15,220 ft)
- Coordinates: 10°01′39″S 77°28′27″W

Geography
- Location: Peru, Ancash Region
- Parent range: Andes, Cordillera Negra

Puka Qaqa (Quechua: Puka Qaqa 'red rock', Hispanicized spelling Pucaccaca) is a 4,640-metre-high (15,220 ft) mountain in the Cordillera Negra in the Andes of Peru. It is situated in the Ancash Region, Recuay Province, on the border of the districts of Huayllapampa and Marca. Puka Qaqa lies southwest of Qulluta and Minas Hirka.
