= Llacllin District =

Coordinates: 10°04′01″S 77°37′01″W

Llacllin
- District
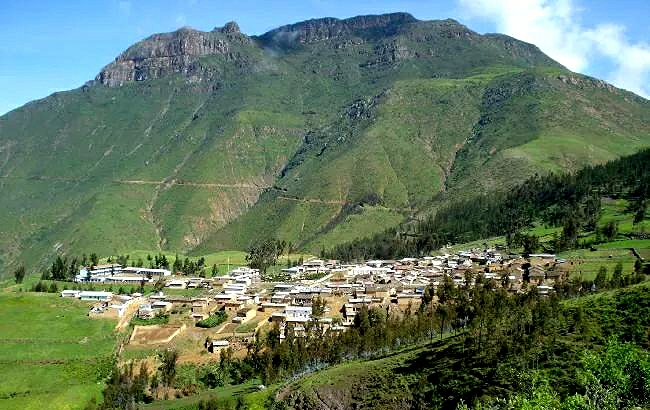
- Interactive map of Llacllin
- Country: Peru
- Region: Ancash
- Province: Recuay
- Founded: November 8, 1963
- Capital: Llacllin

Area
  - Total: 101.1 km^{2} (39.0 sq mi)
- Elevation: 3,008 m (9,869 ft)

Population (2005 census)
  - Total: 807
  - Density: 7.98/km^{2} (20.7/sq mi)
- Time zone: UTC-5 (PET)
- UBIGEO: 021705

Llacllin District is one of ten districts of the Recuay Province in Peru.

== Climate ==
Climate data for Chamana, Llacllin, elevation 1,228 m (4,029 ft), (1991–2020)
Month	Jan	Feb	Mar	Apr	May	Jun	Jul	Aug	Sep	Oct	Nov	Dec	Year
Mean daily maximum °C (°F)	26.5 (79.7)	26.4 (79.5)	26.5 (79.7)	26.9 (80.4)	26.9 (80.4)	26.7 (80.1)	26.7 (80.1)	26.9 (80.4)	26.9 (80.4)	26.6 (79.9)	26.7 (80.1)	26.4 (79.5)	26.7 (80.0)
Mean daily minimum °C (°F)	11.8 (53.2)	11.7 (53.1)	11.9 (53.4)	12.2 (54.0)	12.2 (54.0)	12.0 (53.6)	12.1 (53.8)	12.2 (54.0)	12.3 (54.1)	12.1 (53.8)	12.1 (53.8)	11.8 (53.2)	12.0 (53.7)
Average precipitation mm (inches)	19.7 (0.78)	32.3 (1.27)	33.9 (1.33)	4.2 (0.17)	0.8 (0.03)	0 (0)	0 (0)	0 (0)	0 (0)	1.5 (0.06)	1.8 (0.07)	8.8 (0.35)	103 (4.06)
Source: National Meteorology and Hydrology Service of Peru
