= Qulluta (Recuay) =

Mountain in Peru

- Location within Peru

Highest point
- Elevation: 4,600 m (15,100 ft)
- Coordinates: 9°58′37″S 77°27′21″W

Geography
- Location: Peru, Ancash Region
- Parent range: Andes, Cordillera Negra

Qulluta (Quechua for mortar, also spelled Collota) is a mountain in the Cordillera Negra in the Andes of Peru which reaches a height of approximately 4,600 m (15,092 ft). It is located in the Ancash Region, Recuay Province, on the border of the districts of Huayllapampa and Marca.
