= Pararin District =

Coordinates: 10°03′00″S 77°40′59″W

Pararin
- District
- Interactive map of Pararin
- Country: Peru
- Region: Ancash
- Province: Recuay
- Capital: Pararin

Area
  - Total: 254.85 km^{2} (98.40 sq mi)
- Elevation: 3,383 m (11,099 ft)

Population (2005 census)
  - Total: 912
  - Density: 3.58/km^{2} (9.27/sq mi)
- Time zone: UTC-5 (PET)
- UBIGEO: 021708

Pararin District is one of ten districts of the Recuay Province in Peru.
