= Recuay province =

Coordinates: 9.723429°S 77.457215°W

Recuay
- Province
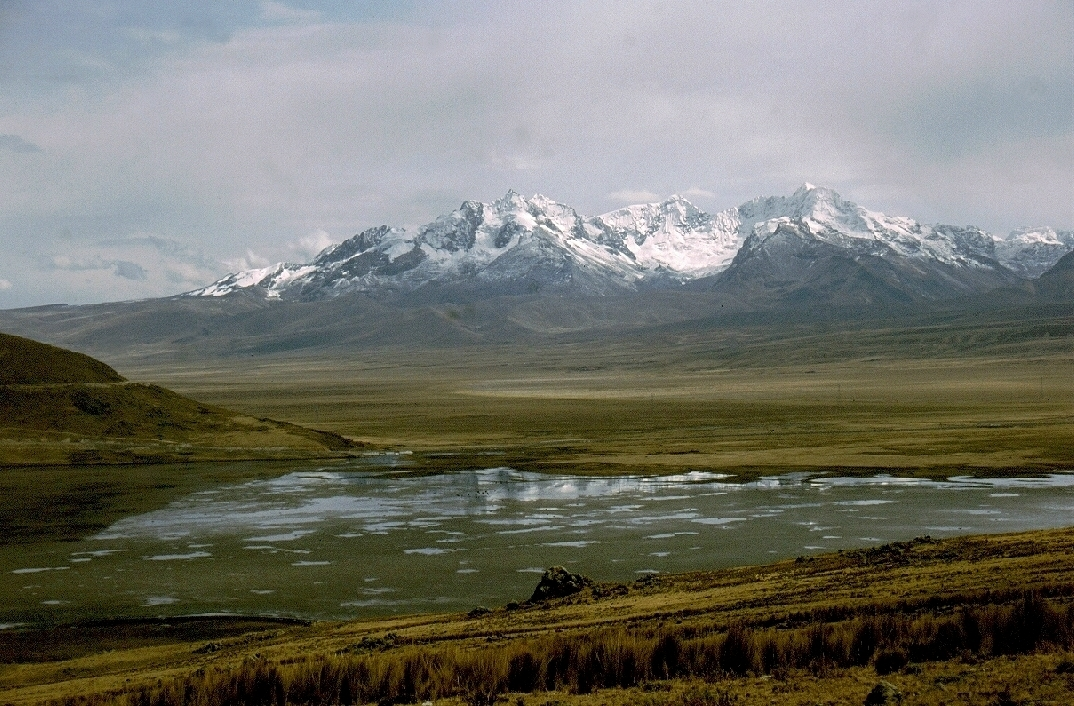
- Quñuqqucha with Qiwllarahu in the background

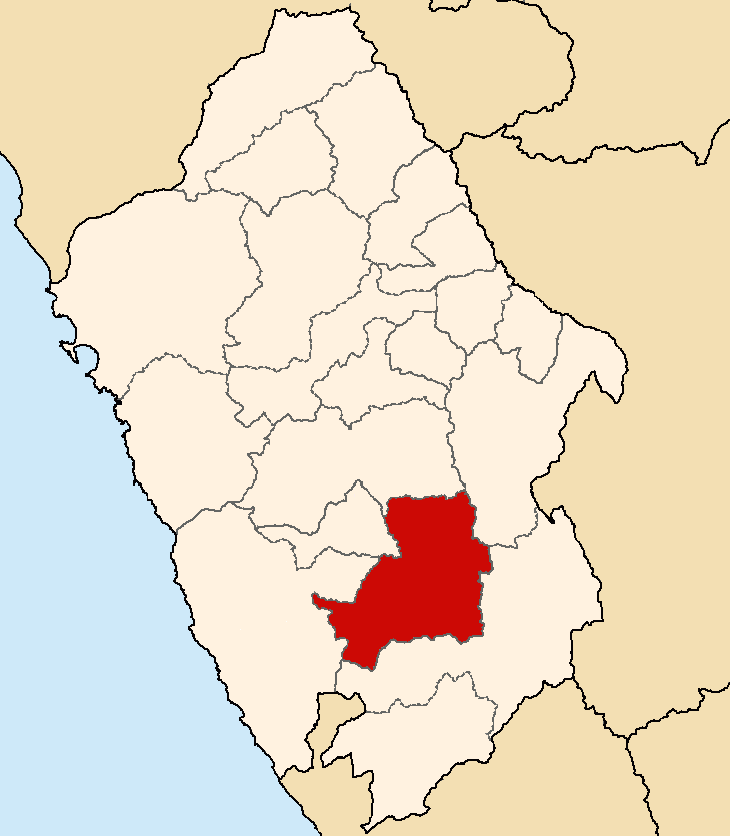
- Location of Recuay in the Ancash Region
- Country: Peru
- Region: Ancash
- Capital: Recuay

Government
  - Mayor: Juniors Carrasco Ferrer (2019-2022)

Area
  - Total: 2,304.19 km^{2} (889.65 sq mi)

Population (2017)
  - Total: 17,185
  - Density: 7.4582/km^{2} (19.317/sq mi)

Recuay is one of twenty provinces of the Ancash Region in Peru. Its seat is the town of Recuay.

== Geography ==
The southern parts of the Cordillera Blanca and the Cordillera Negra traverse the province. Some of the highest peaks of the province are listed below:

- Challwa
- Chunta Punta
- Ichik Qiwlla
- Isku Pata
- Kiswar
- Kunkush
- Kunkush Kancha
- Kunkush Punta
- Kuntur Sinqa
- Kuntur Qaqa
- Kuntur Wayin
- Minapata
- Mururahu
- Puka Allpa
- Puka Hirka
- Puka Qaqa
- Pukarahu (Catac)
- Pukarahu (Ticapampa)
- Puma Wayin
- Qawish
- Qishqi
- Qiwlla Hirka
- Qiwllarahu
- Qullpa Hirka
- Qulluta
- Rukutu Punta
- Sach'a Hirka
- Santun
- Shawanka Punta
- Tantash
- Tuku
- Tunshu Punta
- T'uquyuq
- Wachwaqucha
- Wamas Chakra
- Wank'ap'iti
- Wathiyaqucha
- Wishka Hirka
- Yana Kunkush
- Yanamaray
- Yanaqucha
- Yanarahu

Qiruqucha is one of the largest lakes of the province.

== Political division ==
Recuay is divided into ten districts, which are:

- Catac
- Cotaparaco
- Huayllapampa
- Llacllin
- Marca
- Pampas Chico
- Pararin
- Recuay
- Tapacocha
- Ticapampa

== Ethnic groups ==
The province is inhabited by indigenous citizens of Quechua descent. Spanish is the language which the majority of the population (63.32%) learnt to speak in childhood, 36.42% of the residents started speaking using the Quechua language (2007 Peru Census).

== See also ==
- Hatun Mach'ay
- Pastururi Glacier
- Qishqiqucha
- Quñuqqucha
