= Pampas Chico District =

Coordinates: 10.117°S 77.400°W

Pampas Chico
- District
- Interactive map of Pampas Chico
- Country: Peru
- Region: Ancash
- Province: Recuay
- Founded: October 31, 1941
- Capital: Pampas Chico

Area
  - Total: 100.51 km^{2} (38.81 sq mi)
- Elevation: 3,505 m (11,499 ft)

Population (2005 census)
  - Total: 1,074
  - Density: 10.69/km^{2} (27.68/sq mi)
- Time zone: UTC-5 (PET)
- UBIGEO: 021707

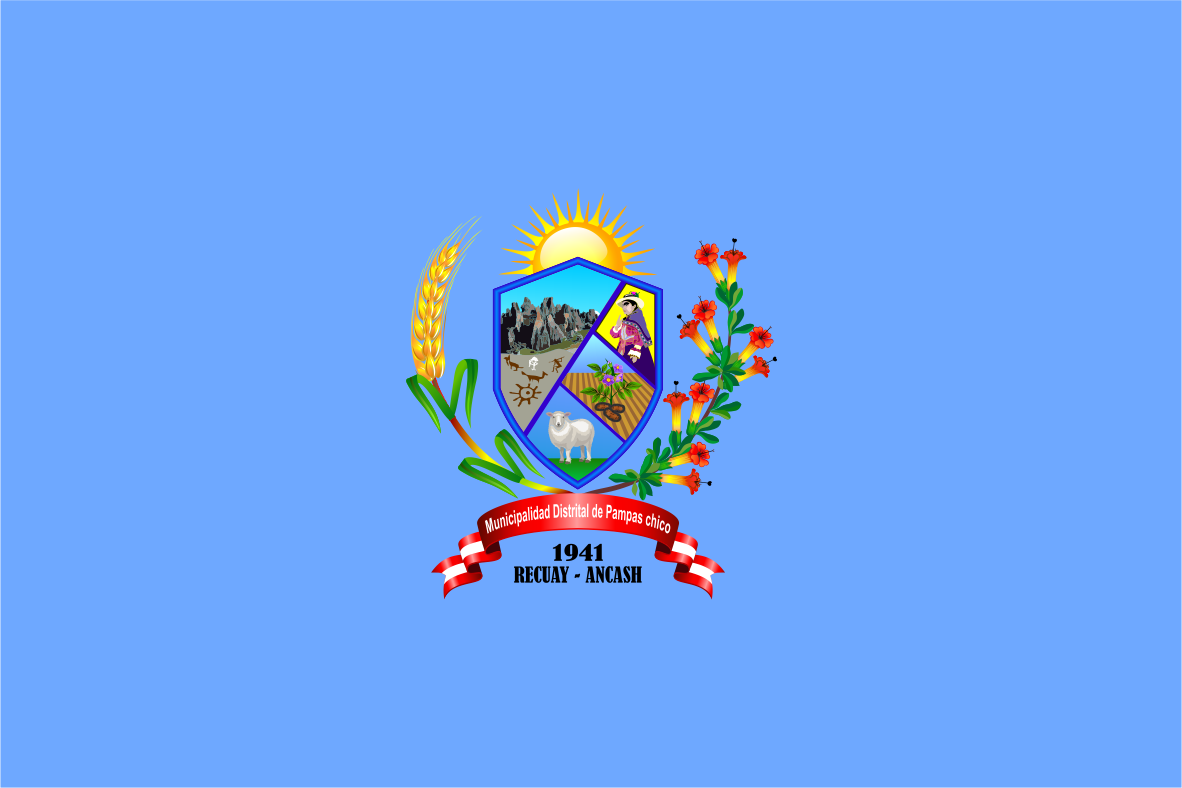
Flag of Pampas Chico

Pampas Chico District is one of ten districts of the Recuay Province in Peru.

== See also ==
- Hatun Mach'ay
