= Kiswar (Recuay) =

Mountain in Peru

- Location within Peru

Highest point
- Elevation: 4,600 m (15,100 ft)
- Coordinates: 9°57′47″S 77°26′21″W

Geography
- Location: Peru, Ancash
- Parent range: Cordillera Negra

Kiswar (Quechua for Buddleja incana, also spelled Quisuar) is a mountain in the Cordillera Negra in the Andes of Peru which reaches a height of approximately 4,600 m (15,100 ft). It lies in the Ancash Region, Recuay Province, on the border of the districts of Catac, Huayllapampa and Tapacocha.
