= Pucaraju (Ticapampa) =

Mountain in Peru

- Tunsho, Pucarajo
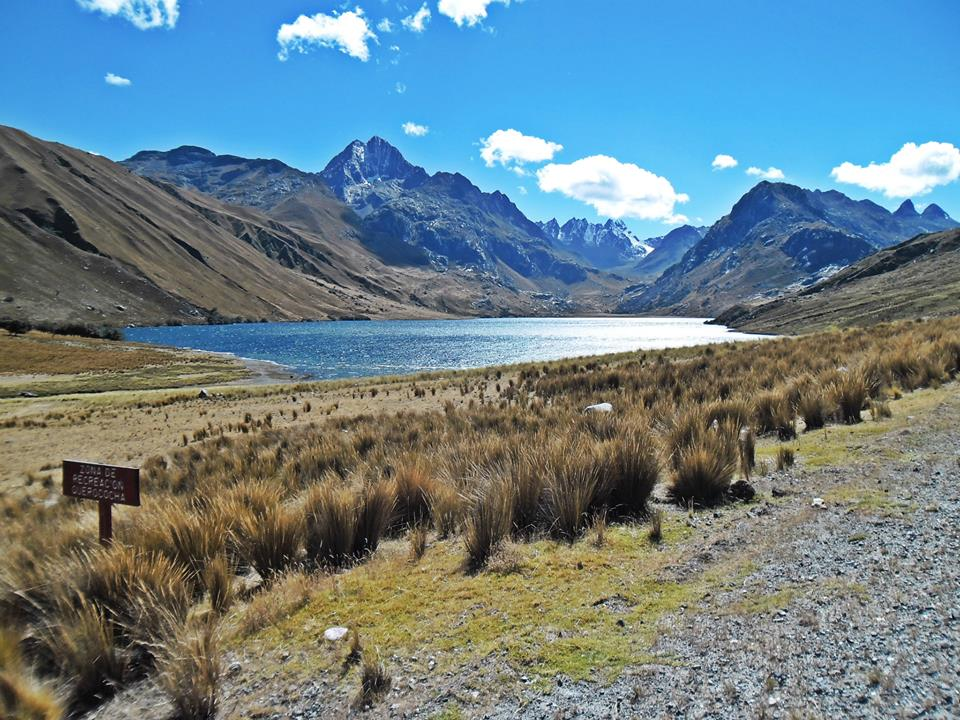
- Lake Querococha and Mount Pucaraju (center-left)

Highest point
- Elevation: 5,346 m (17,539 ft)
- Coordinates: 9°40′30″S 77°18′35″W

Geography
- Location within Peru
- Location: Ancash, Peru
- Parent range: Cordillera Blanca

Climbing
- First ascent: 1-1967 via S.face: N.W. ridge-1973.

Pucaraju (possibly from Quechua puka red, rahu snow, ice, mountain with snow, "red snow-covered mountain") is a mountain in the Cordillera Blanca in the Andes of Peru, about 5,346 metres (17,539 ft) high or 5,322 metres (17,461 ft) high depending on the source. It is situated in the Ancash Region, Recuay Province, Ticapampa District. Pucaraju lies west of Yanamarey and northeast of Lake Querococha.

The IGN-Peru map, cites the main peak as Tunsho, while applying the name Pucarajo to the southern slopes.
