= Lake Querococha =

Lake in Peru

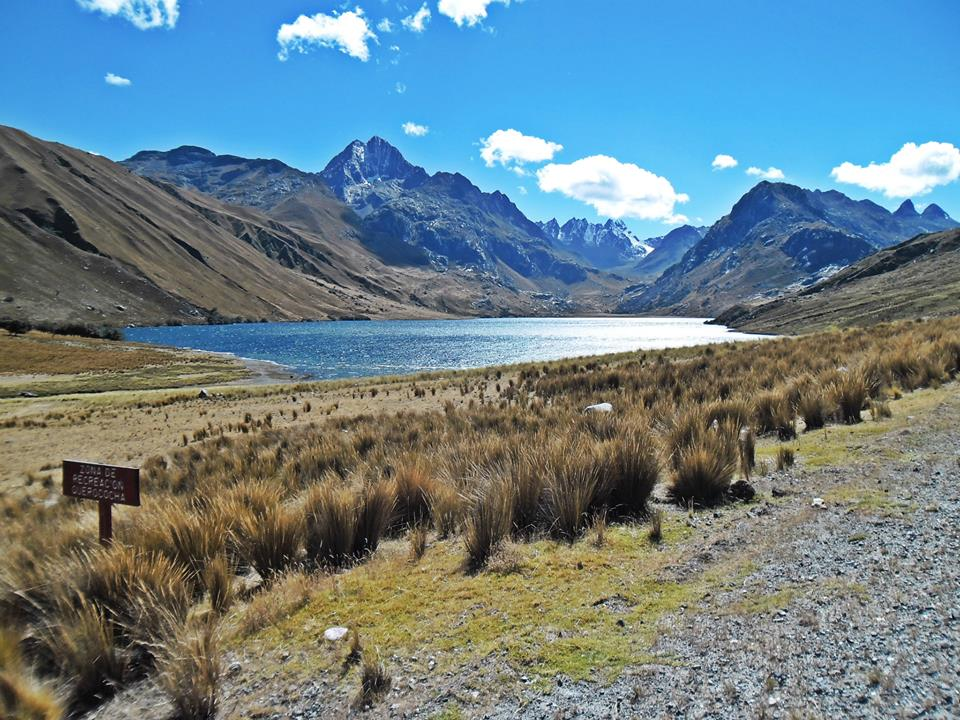
- Querococha and Mount Pucaraju (center-left). In the background the Yanamarey glacier is visible.

- Location within Peru
- Location: Ancash, Peru
- Coordinates: 9°42′58″S 77°19′27″W
- Basin countries: Peru
- Max. length: 2.43 km (1.51 mi)
- Max. width: 0.87 km (0.54 mi)
- Surface elevation: 3,980 m (13,060 ft)

Lake Querococha (possibly from Quechua qiru ceremonial drinking vessel, or q'iru wood and qucha lake; "qiru lake" or "wood lake") is a lake in Peru located in the Ancash Region, Recuay Province, in the districts Ticapampa and Catac. The lake is situated at a height of 3,980 metres (13,060 ft), about 2.43 km long and 0.87 km at its widest point. Lake Querococha lies on the western side of the Cordillera Blanca, southwest of Yanamarey and Pucaraju, northwest of Mururaju and Queshque and east of Recuay.

== Climate ==
Climate data for Lake Querococha elevation 4,037 m (13,245 ft)
Month	Jan	Feb	Mar	Apr	May	Jun	Jul	Aug	Sep	Oct	Nov	Dec	Year
Mean daily maximum °C (°F)	13.0 (55.4)	12.8 (55.0)	12.9 (55.2)	13.5 (56.3)	14.0 (57.2)	13.9 (57.0)	13.9 (57.0)	14.5 (58.1)	14.5 (58.1)	14.4 (57.9)	14.3 (57.7)	13.8 (56.8)	13.8 (56.8)
Daily mean °C (°F)	7.6 (45.7)	7.7 (45.9)	7.8 (46.0)	7.9 (46.2)	7.8 (46.0)	7.3 (45.1)	7.2 (45.0)	7.6 (45.7)	7.9 (46.2)	8.0 (46.4)	7.9 (46.2)	7.8 (46.0)	7.7 (45.9)
Mean daily minimum °C (°F)	2.2 (36.0)	2.5 (36.5)	2.6 (36.7)	2.3 (36.1)	1.5 (34.7)	0.7 (33.3)	0.4 (32.7)	0.6 (33.1)	1.2 (34.2)	1.6 (34.9)	1.5 (34.7)	1.8 (35.2)	1.6 (34.8)
Average precipitation mm (inches)	150.4 (5.92)	155.7 (6.13)	169.5 (6.67)	89.3 (3.52)	38.0 (1.50)	13.3 (0.52)	6.7 (0.26)	13.5 (0.53)	41.3 (1.63)	88.1 (3.47)	94.4 (3.72)	125.6 (4.94)	985.8 (38.81)
Average relative humidity (%)	70	72	66	61	58	60	57	58	60	64	63	66	63
Source 1: Gobierno Regional de Ancash
Source 2: Institut de recherche pour le développement (precipitation)

== See also ==
- Queshquecocha
- List of lakes in Peru
