= Waraqayuq =

Archaeological site in Peru

- Location within Peru

Highest point
- Elevation: 4,600 m (15,100 ft)
- Coordinates: 9°39′55″S 77°13′30″W

Geography
- Location: Peru, Ancash Region, Huari Province
- Parent range: Cordillera Blanca

Waraqayuq (Quechua waraqa sack, -yuq a suffix to indicate ownership, "the one with a sack", Hispanicized spelling Huaracayoc) or Warak'ayuq (warak'a sling or slingshot, "the one with a sling") is a mountain with an archaeological site of the same name in the Cordillera Blanca in the Andes of Peru, about 4,600 metres (15,092 ft) high. It is situated in the Ancash Region, Huari Province, Chavin de Huantar District, east of the mountain Yanamaray.

The archaeological site of Waraqayuq lies on the northern slope of the mountain at 9°39′30″S 77°13′15″W, above the Walpish valley (Hualpish).
