= Qishqiqucha =

Lake in Ancash, Peru

- Location within Peru
- Location: Peru; Ancash Region
- Coordinates: 9°49′31″S 77°18′35″W
- Max. length: 0.7 km (0.43 mi)
- Max. width: 0.39 km (0.24 mi)
- Surface elevation: 4,284 m (14,055 ft)

Qishqiqucha (Quechua qishqi, a type of bromeliad, qucha lake, Hispanicized spelling Gueshguecocha, Queshquecocha) is a lake in the Cordillera Blanca in Peru. It is located in the Ancash Region, Recuay Province, Catac District. It is situated at a height of about 4,284 metres (14,055 ft), about 0.7 km long and 0.39 km at its widest point. Qishqiqucha lies in the Huascarán National Park, southwest of Mururahu and Qishqi.

The lake receives waters from a little river. Upstream it is called Tranka Ruri and downstream Qishqi (Gueshgue, Queshque). It flows along the little village of Qishqi (Gueshgue, Queshque, Queshqui).

It is known that the Puya raimondii, a plant with a gigantic inflorescence that may reach up to 10 m in height, grows in the Qishqi river valley. The names of the lake, the village and the river refer to this plant.
