= Queshque =

Mountain in Peru

- Gueshgue, Pongos
- Location within Peru

Highest point
- Elevation: 5,630 m (18,470 ft)
- Coordinates: 9°46′28″S 77°14′51″W

Geography
- Location: Peru, Ancash Region
- Parent range: Andes, Cordillera Blanca

Queshque (possibly from Quechua for a type of bromeliad), or Gueshgue is a 5,630-metre-high (18,471 ft) mountain in the Cordillera Blanca in the Andes of Peru. It is situated in the Ancash Region, Huari Province, Chavín de Huantar District, and in the Recuay Province, Catac District.

The volume of mass loss of the three glaciers of Queshque has been documented recently. The glaciers feed Lake Qishqiqucha via the Tranca Ruri river.

The Austrian Alpine Club (OeAV) survey map represents Queshque as comprising three peaks with a different name each: Shahuanca, Jatunllacsa (the highest peak) and Gueshgue. However, tourist maps of Cordillera Blanca show this mountain with the name of Pongos.
