= Pucarajo (Catac) =

Mountain in Peru

- Location within Peru

Highest point
- Elevation: 5,000 m (16,000 ft)
- Coordinates: 9°51′11″S 77°15′23″W

Geography
- Location: Peru, Ancash, Recuay Province, Catac District
- Parent range: Cordillera Blanca

Pucarajo (possibly from Quechua puka red, rahu snow, ice, mountain with snow, "red snow-covered mountain") is a mountain in the southern part of the Cordillera Blanca in the Andes of Peru, about 5,000 metres (16,404 ft) high. It is situated in the Ancash Region, Recuay Province, Catac District. The peaks of Pucarajo lies southeast, south and southwest of Mururaju.
