= Pastoruri Glacier =

Glacier in Peru

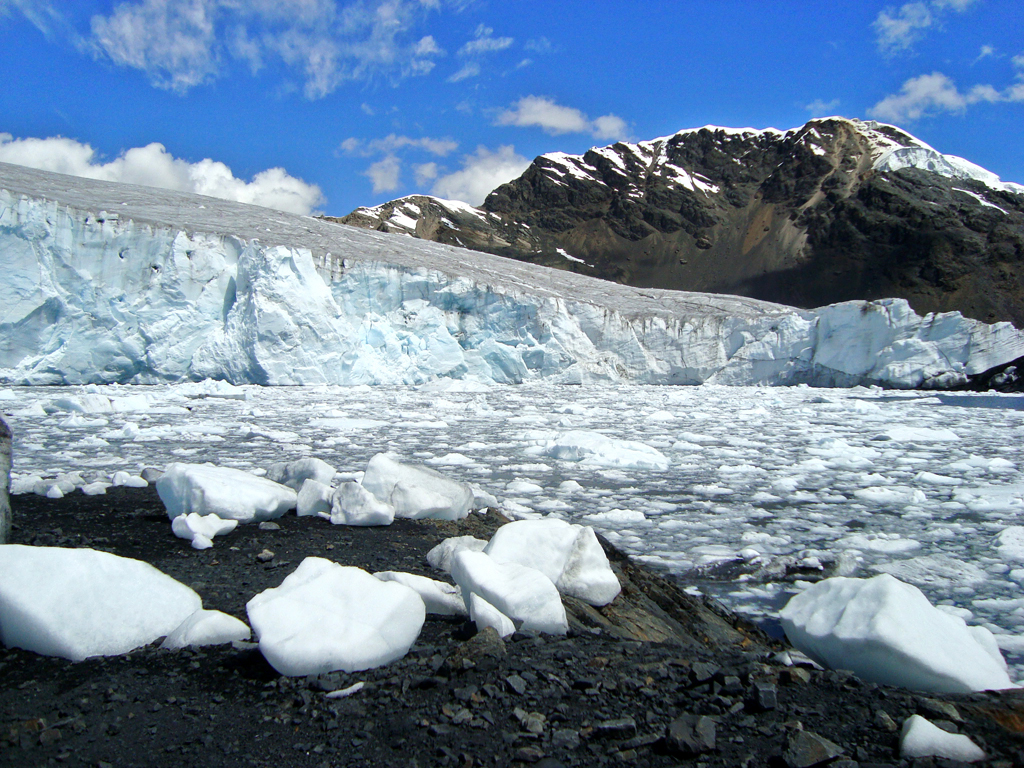
- View of Pastoruri Glacier in 2010
- Interactive map of Pastoruri Glacier
- Type: Valley glacier
- Location: Peru
- Coordinates: 09°55′12″S 77°10′56″W
- Area: 8 km^{2} (3.1 sq mi)
- Length: 4 km (2.5 mi)
- Terminus: Lake
- Status: Retreating

The Pastoruri glacier is a cirque glacier, located in the southern part of the Cordillera Blanca, part of the Andes mountain range, in Northern Peru in the Ancash region. It is one of the few glaciers left in the tropical areas of South America.

== Description ==
The glacier is around 8 square kilometres (3.1 sq mi) in size, and around 4 kilometres (2.5 mi) long with a terrestrial snout ending. The glacier is currently retreating quickly. It has lost 22% of its size and 15.5% of its ice mass in the last 30–35 years.

The glacier occupies an Andean peak around 5,250 metres (17,200 feet) above sea level, and so has steep, cliff like edges, with heavily crevassed areas characteristic of a cirque glacier.

The area and the glacier is usually covered in soft snow and is a popular area with tourists, snowboarders and ice climbers.

== Maintenance ==
Engineer Benjamin Morales Arnao, local glaciologist, has tested a method to reverse the thaw; cover the ice with a layer of sawdust 15 cm thick. The experiment was carried out on Mount Chaupijanca and Pastoruri. The first glacier managed to keep four meters of ice and the second kept five meters. "This material acts as an insulator. It contains cellulose and thus we managed to decrease the melting glacier. Although this method has worked well, we'll be testing other alternatives", said Morales. "Those experiments curb glacial retreat on a small scale, but cannot bring ice blocks like Pastoruri back from the brink," said Selwyn Valverde with the Huascaran National Park, home to Pastoruri and more than 700 other shrinking Peruvian glaciers. "It's irreversible at this point," he said, adding that Pastoruri is no longer technically a glacier because it does not build up ice in the winter to release in the summer. "It's just loss, loss, loss now. It doesn't accumulate anymore."
