= Mururaju =

Mountain in Peru

- Pongos Sur
- Location within Peru

Highest point
- Elevation: 5,688 m (18,661 ft)
- Coordinates: 9°48′27″S 77°14′38″W

Geography
- Location: Peru, Ancash Region
- Parent range: Andes, Cordillera Blanca

Mururaju, Murrorajo or Pongos Sur is a mountain in the Cordillera Blanca in the Andes of Peru, about 5,688 metres (18,661 ft) high. It is situated in the Ancash Region, Huari Province, Chavín de Huantar District and in the Recuay Province, Catac District. Mururaju lies southeast of Lake Querococha, northeast of the lake Qishqiqucha and south of Queshque.

The Austrian Alpine Club (OeAV) survey map gives this mountain the name of Pongos.
