= Santa River =

River in Peru

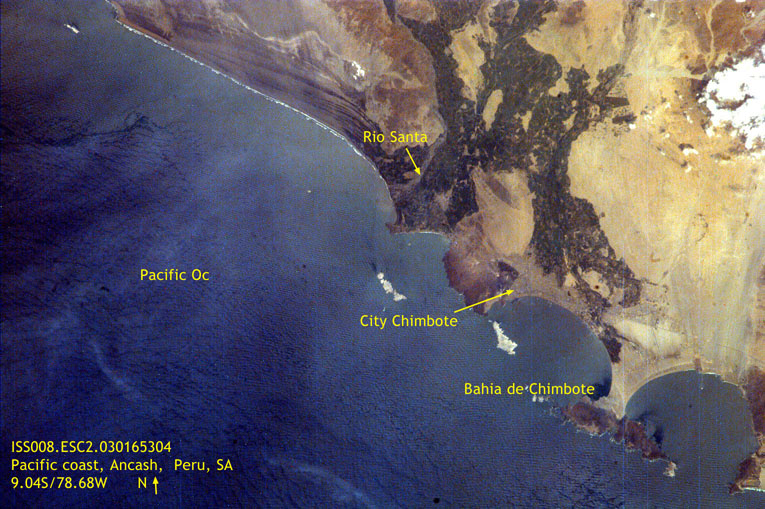
- Satellite image showing the mouth of the Santa River near Chimbote

- Location of mouth
- Native name: Rio Santa (Spanish)

Location
- Country: Peru
- Region: Ancash Region

Physical characteristics
- Source
  - coordinates: 10°07′42″S 77°16′59″W
  - elevation: 4,050 m (13,290 ft)
- Mouth: Pacific Ocean
  - location: Santa, Peru
  - coordinates: 8°57′57″S 78°38′05″W
- Length: 347 km (216 mi)

Basin features
- Tributaries
  - right: Manta, Kitaraqsa, Allpamayu, Yuraqmayu, Qillqay, Llikllamayu

The Santa River (Spanish: Río Santa) is a river in the South American Andes mountain range in the Ancash Region of northwest central Peru.

== River course ==
Lake Conococha, at an altitude of 4,050 m above sea level and at 10°07′42″S 77°16′59″W, is considered the headwaters of the Santa River. Lake Conococha itself is fed by small streams from the Cordillera Negra in the west and the snowcapped Cordillera Blanca in the east. The main tributary of the lake is Tuco River which has its source at Lake Tuco (9°56′40″S 77°11′44″W) about 5,000 m above sea level at one of the glacier tongues of mount Tuco.

The Santa River emerges from Lake Conococha and runs for 200 km in a northerly direction between the Cordillera Negra in the west and the Cordillera Blanca in the east, forming the fertile Callejón de Huaylas. At 2000 m above sea level, the river changes its course to a westerly direction, squeezing through the narrow gorge of Cañon del Pato ("duck's canyon") before it finally breaks through the coastal ridges.

During the dry season from June to November, the Santa River provides only a little water for irrigation, drinking water and hydroelectric power. A couple of water reservoirs have been established to control the fluctuation of the river. Upstream of the hydroelectric power plant at Huallanca, the Santa River watershed covers an area of 4,900 km^{2}, downstream another 7,300 km^{2}.

The mouth of the river, after the river runs a total length of 347 km, is at 8°58′21″S 78°38′19″W near Santa, 10 km north of the coastal town of Chimbote. In 1984, gold dust was discovered in the mouth of Santa River which caused a regional gold fever among the rural population.

== Towns ==
From Lake Conococha to the river mouth, towns along the river are:

- 0 km Conococha (4,050 m elevation)
- 62 km Recuay (3,400 m)
- 88 km Huaraz (3,090 m)
- 126 km Carhuaz (2,650 m)
- 153 km Yungay, Peru (2,500 m)
- 163 km Caraz (2,290 m)
- 205 km Huallanca (1,820 m)
- 215 km Yuracmarca (1,420 m)
- 343 km Santa (20 m)

For most of its course, the Santa River is accompanied by a paved road.

== Natural hazards ==
The Santa Valley has always experienced severe disasters. Beginning in 1702 when a glaciological flood is first recorded, the valley has repeatedly suffered deaths and destruction. In 1941, a flood destroyed one-third of Huaraz, killing 5,000 to 7,000 people. In 1962 and 1970, a massive avalanche of ice and rocks tumbled down from the western slopes of Huascarán and then roared down the river valley. The Santa River rose by eight metres and 3,000 to 4,000 people were killed in the catastrophe. Devastating landslides like these will always threaten the region, when falling glacial ice triggers sudden drainages of ice-dammed lakes in the mountainous region and liquid mud, blocks of ice and large rock boulders crash down the narrow valleys.

== Gallery ==
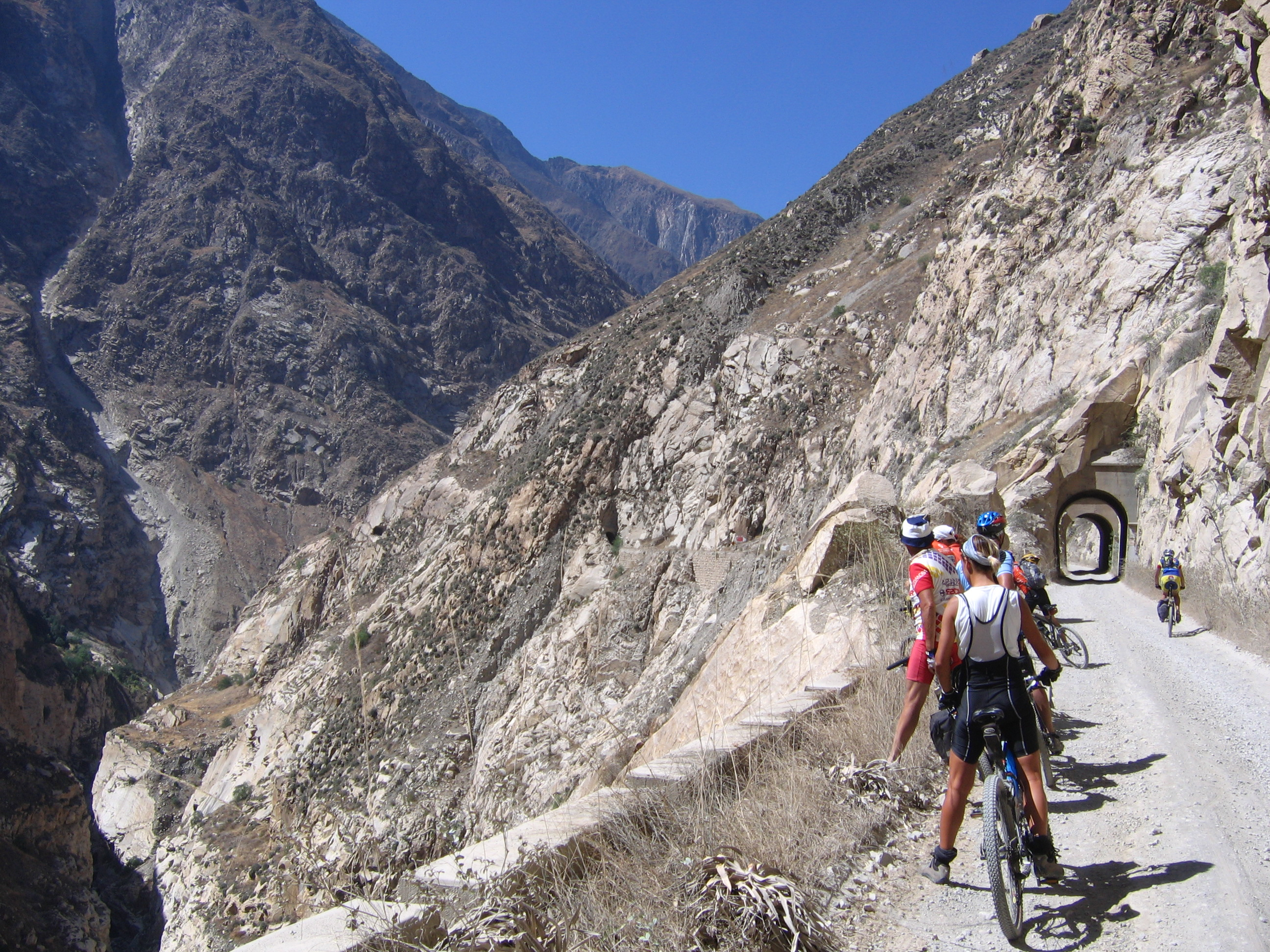
Cañon del Pato
