= Lake Conococha =

Lake in Peru

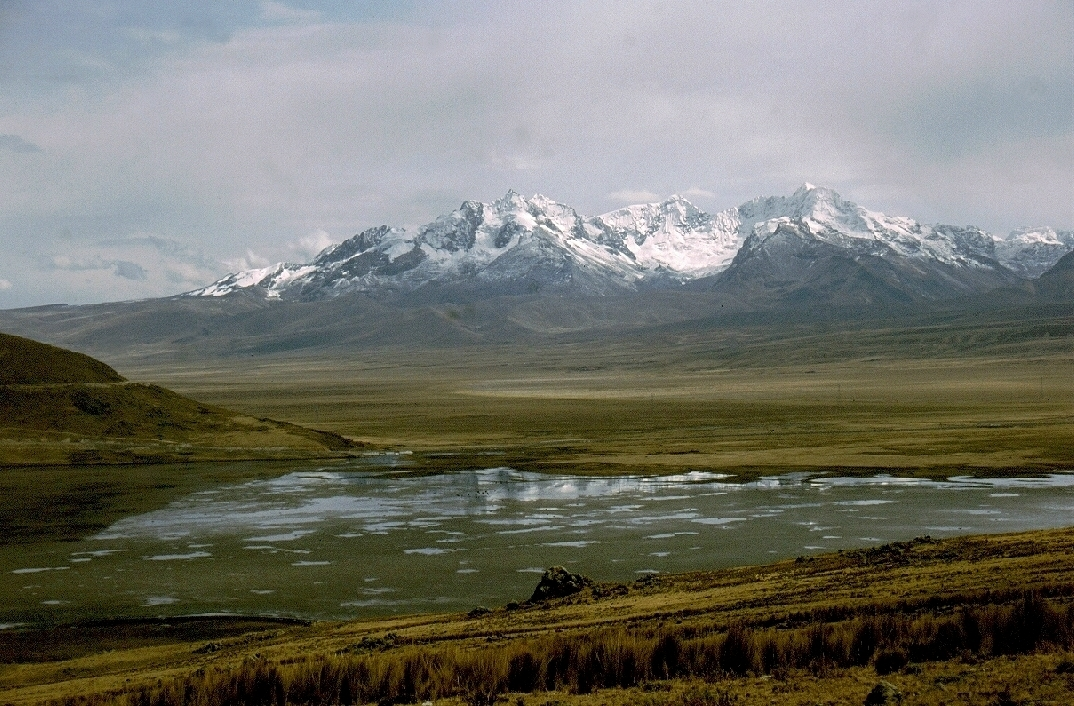
- Lake Conococha with Mount Caullaraju in the background.

- Location within Peru
- Location: Ancash, Peru
- Coordinates: 10°07′40″S 77°17′02″W
- Primary inflows: Small streams from Cordillera Blanca and Cordillera Negra mountain ranges.
- Primary outflows: Santa River
- Basin countries: Peru
- Surface area: 1.976 km^{2} (0.763 sq mi)
- Surface elevation: 4,020 metres (13,189 ft)

Lake Conococha (possibly from Quechua quñuq, qunuq warm, lukewarm, qucha lake, "warm lake") is a South American lake located in the Andes mountains of northwestern Peru. It is located in the region of Ancash near the junction of the roads going from Callejón de Huaylas to Chiquián.

== Geography ==
Conococha

Climate chart (precipitation, max. and min. temperature)
J	F	M	A	M	J	J	A	S	O	N	D
81 11 0	98 11 1	138 11 1	62 12 0	22 12 −3	4 12 −6	1 13 −6	4 12 −5	10 12 −3	35 12 −2	44 12 −2	44 12 −2
- █ Average max. and min. temperatures in °C
- █ Precipitation totals in mm
- Source: Climate-Data.org
Imperial conversion
J	F	M	A	M	J	J	A	S	O	N	D
3.2 52 32	3.9 51 34	5.4 52 33	2.4 53 32	0.9 54 27	0.2 53 22	0 55 21	0.2 54 22	0.4 53 26	1.4 53 28	1.7 53 29	1.7 53 29
- █ Average max. and min. temperatures in °F
- █ Precipitation totals in inches

Lake Conococha has an elevation of 4,020 metres (13,189 ft) above sea level and an extension of 1.976 square kilometres (0.763 sq mi). It is located at the headwaters of the Santa River which runs in a northwest direction from the lake.

According to the Köppen climate classification, the area presents a tundra climate (ET); with a mean annual temperature of 4.7 °C and an average annual rainfall of 543 mm.

The village of Conococha is located on the western shore of the lake, where the roads from Lima and Pativilca to Huaraz and Chiquián meet.

== Ecology ==
=== Flora ===
Aquatic vegetation on the shores is represented by reeds of Scirpus spp. and aquatic herbs like watercress, Elodea potamogeton and Myriophyllum sp. While the surrounding meadows include plants of genera Carex and Calamagrostis.

=== Fauna ===
The lake is home to a frog species (Telmatobius mayoloi) discovered in 1996 and endemic of the Santa River basin.

== Environmental issues ==
Lake Conococha is undergoing a process of eutrophication (overpopulation of plants and algae due to pollution), being the main reasons: livestock raising, blackwater from the surrounding villages, and disposal of solid waste on the lake shores.

== See also ==
- Caullaraju
