= Caullaraju =

Mountain in Peru

- Jeulla Rajo, Jenhuaracra
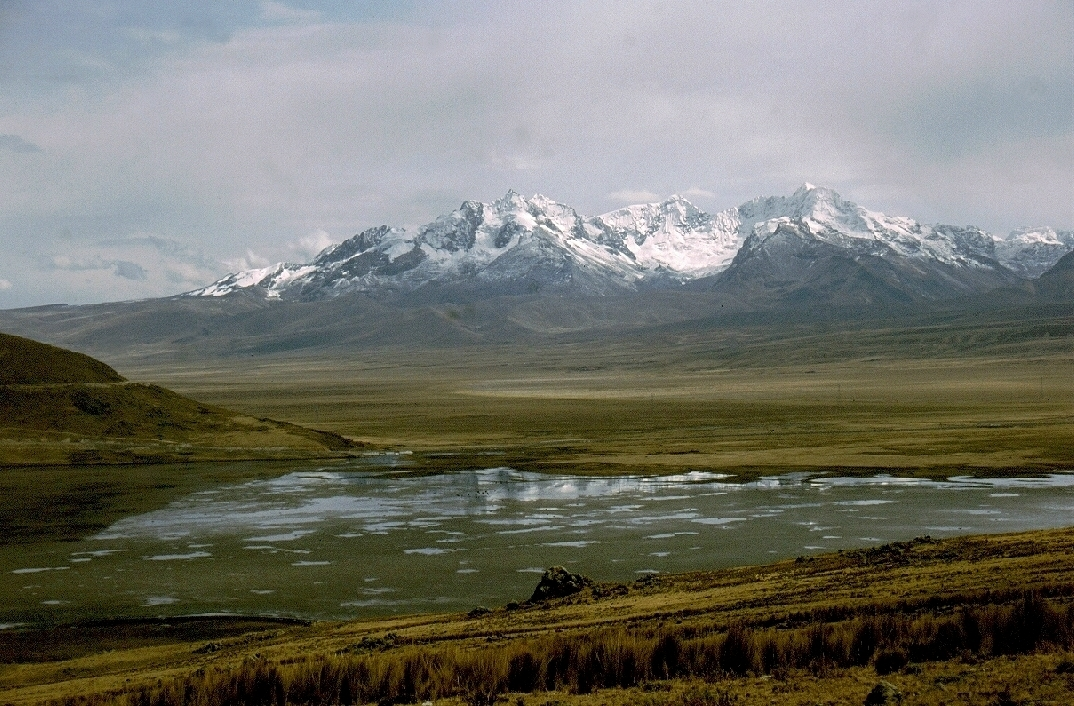
- Caullaraju and Lake Conococha

Highest point
- Elevation: 5,682 m (18,642 ft)
- Coordinates: 9°57′45″S 77°15′36″W

Geography
- Location within Peru
- Location: Peru, Ancash Region
- Parent range: Andes, Cordillera Blanca

Climbing
- First ascent: -1962 via N. face: W. side-1966: N.E. ridge-1977

Caullaraju or Jeulla Rajo (possibly from Quechua qiwlla gull, rahu snow, ice, mountain with snow, "snow-covered gull mountain") is a mountain in the Cordillera Blanca in the Andes of Peru, about 5,682 m (18,642 ft) high. It is located in the Ancash Region, Recuay Province. In the IGN-Peru map, the highest peak is reported to be named Jenhuaracra.

== See also ==
- Lake Conococha
