= Ramón de la Fuente =

Ramón de la Fuente may refer to:

- Ramón de la Fuente Muñiz (1921–2006), Mexican psychiatrist
- Juan Ramón de la Fuente (born 1951), Mexican psychiatrist, son of the above
- Ramón de la Fuente Leal (1907–1973), Spanish footballer
