= Nasli Heeramaneck =

Parsi-American art dealer

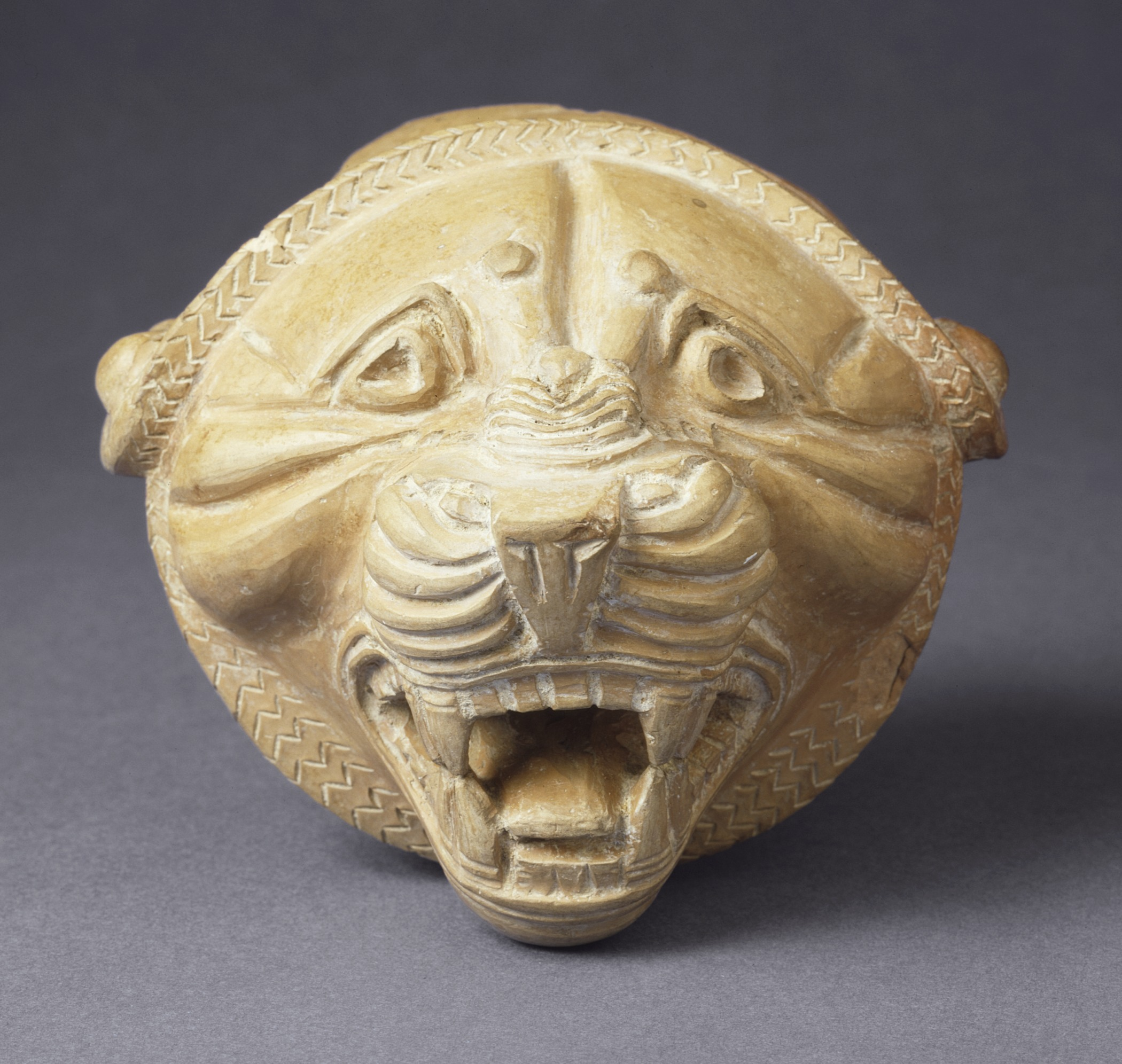
Achaemenid lion head gifted by Heeramaneck to LACMA.

Nasli Heeramaneck (1902 – March 29, 1971) was a Parsi-American art dealer, specializing in Asian and Pre-Columbian art. Born in Bombay, he moved to New York in the 1920s, and lived and worked there until his death. Works collected by him and his wife, Alice, are now held by the Los Angeles County Museum of Art, the National Museum of New Delhi, and Yale University.
