= Beatriz de la Fuente =

Mexican art historian (1929–2005)

Beatriz Ramírez de la Fuente
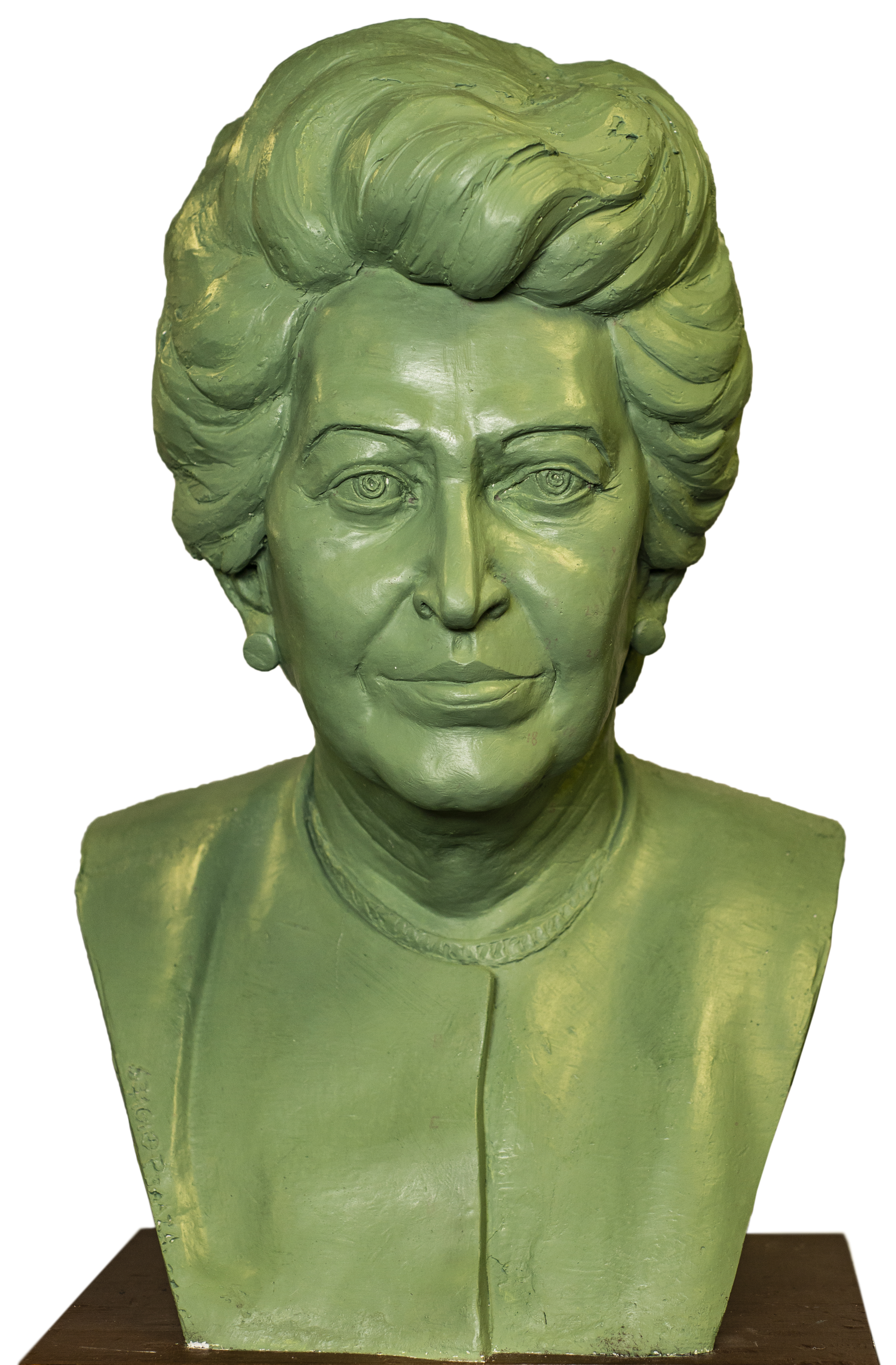
- Memorial bust of Beatriz Ramírez De la Fuente
- Born: February 6, 1929 (age 97); Mexico City
- Died: June 20, 2005 (aged 76); Mexico City
- Occupation: Director: Instituto de Investigaciones Estéticas (UNAM)
- Board member of: El Colegio Nacional; Academia Mexicana de la Historia
- Spouse: Ramón de la Fuente Muñiz
- Children: Juan Ramón de la Fuente
- Awards: National Prize for Arts 1989

Academic background
- Education: Universidad Nacional Autónoma de México

Academic work
- Discipline: Art historian
- Sub-discipline: Pre-Columbian art, Olmecs

Beatriz Ramírez de la Fuente (6 February 1929, in Mexico City – 20 June 2005, in Mexico City) was a Mexican art historian and academic, notable for her work on pre-Columbian art, especially Olmec and pre-Columbian murals.

Her research on Mexican pre-Columbian art contributed to changing the way pre-Columbian cultures were studied in the United States and the way contemporary art is generally conceived.

She dedicated herself to making the indigenous art of ancient Mexico understandable, as well as protecting its cultural heritage.

== Early life ==
Beatriz Ramírez was born in Mexico City. She studied literature in National Autonomous University of Mexico (UNAM), graduating in 1953. She subsequently obtained the master's degree in art history from the Universidad Iberoamericana in 1957, and a doctorate in art history from UNAM in 1967.

== Biography ==
She was a teacher at the Faculty of Philosophy and Literature at UNAM, at Universidad Iberoamericana, as well as at the Escuela Nacional de Antropología.

Between 1963 and 1970, she was the director of the School of Art History at the Universidad Iberoamericana.

Between 1979 and 1996 she was the vicepresident of the Comité International d'Histoire de l'Art (CIHA), and chair of its Mexican committee between 1977 and 1984. In 1980 she got Mexico to host a CIHA colloquium on funerary art.

Between 1980 and 1986 she headed of the Instituto de Investigaciones Estéticas (Institute of Aesthetics Studies) of UNAM as director. She authored 12 books and over 90 articles in research journals.

She was married to psychiatrist Ramón de la Fuente Muñiz. Her son is Juan Ramón de la Fuente, a renowned politician and academic, who is also a recipient of the National Prize for Arts and Sciences.

She died on 20 June 2005, in Mexico City.

== Awards and Distinctions ==
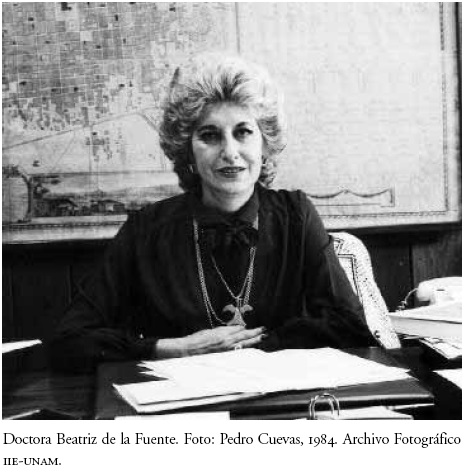
Beatriz de la Fuente (1984) by Pedro Cuevas. Photographic file Instituto de Investigaciones Estéticas UNAM

She was the first female member of El Colegio Nacional, since 7 May 1985.

She was awarded the National Prize for Arts in 1989, in the History, Social Sciences and Philosophy category.

In 1992 the UNAM awarded her the Premio Universidad Nacional and made her emeritus researcher in 1996.

In 1998, she was elected a member of the Academia Mexicana de la Historia.

In 2005 the Peabody Museum of Archaeology and Ethnology at Harvard University gave her the "Tatiana Proskouriakoff Award" posthumously, "for her outstanding contributions to Mesoamerican Art History and Archeology".

The 'Museo de Murales Teotihuacanos' (Teotihuacan Murals Museum) at Teotihuacan is named after her. It's an archaeological museum which features numerous mural fragments, along with models and in-depth information about the mural creation process. The exhibits, organized into nine themes across 13 galleries, also showcase an extensive collection of archaeological artifacts, including stone carvings, obsidian pieces, and pottery.
