= Ramón de la Fuente Muñiz =

Mexican psychiatrist (1921–2006)

- Born: 29 August 1921; Mexico City, Mexico
- Died: 31 March 2006 (aged 84); Mexico City, Mexico
- Education: National Autonomous University of Mexico, University of Nebraska
- Occupation: Psychiatrist
- Known for: founding the Mexican Institute of Psychiatry and chairing the National Academy of Medicine
- Spouse: Beatriz Ramírez de la Fuente
- Children: 4

Ramón de la Fuente Muñiz (29 August 1921 – 31 March 2006) was a Mexican psychiatrist who chaired the National Academy of Medicine of Mexico (1959), served as vice-president of World Psychiatric Association (1970–76) and founded the Mexican Institute of Psychiatry in 1979.

De la Fuente graduated with a degree in Medicine from the National Autonomous University of Mexico in 1944 and specialized in Neuropsychiatry at both the Clarkson Hospital of the University of Nebraska (1944–46) and the New York University School of Medicine (1946).

He was a founding member and a chairman of the Mexican Society of Psychoanalysis (1956), the Mexican Psychiatric Association (1967–69), the Mexican Council of Psychiatry and the Mexican College of Neuropsychopharmacology. He also advised the World Health Organization from 1972 to 2000 and entered The National College on 4 April 1972.

De la Fuente died of cardiorespiratory arrest on 31 March 2006 in Mexico City. He had been married to Beatriz Ramírez de la Fuente, a renowned art historian who had died a year earlier. His son, Juan Ramón, served as Secretary of Health in the cabinet of President Ernesto Zedillo and as Dean of the National Autonomous University of Mexico from 1999 to 2007.
