= Juan Ramón de la Fuente =

Mexican politician

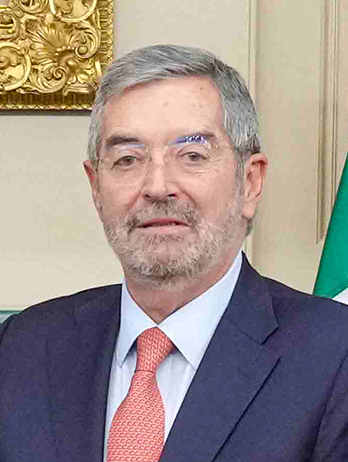
- De la Fuente in 2025

Secretary of Foreign Affairs
- In office 1 October 2024 – 1 April 2026
- President: Claudia Sheinbaum
- Preceded by: Alicia Bárcena Ibarra
- Succeeded by: Roberto Velasco Álvarez

Permanent Representative of Mexico to the United Nations
- In office 21 December 2018 – 13 September 2023
- Nominated by: Andrés Manuel López Obrador
- Appointed by: Senate of Mexico
- Preceded by: Juan José Gómez Camacho
- Succeeded by: Alicia Buenrostro Massieu

Rector of the National Autonomous University of Mexico
- In office 17 November 1999 – 16 November 2007
- Preceded by: Francisco Barnés de Castro
- Succeeded by: José Narro Robles

Secretary of Health
- In office 1 December 1994 – 17 November 1999
- President: Ernesto Zedillo
- Preceded by: Jesús Kumate Rodríguez
- Succeeded by: José Antonio González Fernández

Personal details
- Born: 5 September 1951 (age 74) Mexico City, Mexico
- Party: Independent
- Parent(s): Ramón de la Fuente Muñiz; Beatriz Ramírez de la Fuente
- Education: Physician with a specialization in psychiatry
- Alma mater: National Autonomous University of Mexico (MD, 1969–1975); University of Minnesota (Specialization in Psychiatry, 2000–2003)
- Profession: Physician, professor, public official, author, diplomat, researcher
- Awards: National Prize for Science

Juan Ramón de la Fuente Ramírez (Note: In this Spanish name, the first or paternal surname is de la Fuente and the second or maternal family name is Ramírez.) (born 5 September 1951) is a Mexican psychiatrist, academician and politician who has served as the secretary of foreign affairs from 2024 until his resignation in 2026 during the presidency of Claudia Sheinbaum. He previously served as secretary of health in the cabinet of President Ernesto Zedillo (1994–1999) and as rector of the National Autonomous University of Mexico (UNAM) from 1999 to 2007. He is a professor emeritus of Psychiatry at National Autonomous University of Mexico (UNAM) and chairs the foard of the Aspen Institute Mexico. From 18 February 2019 to 13 September 2023 he served as the permanent representative of Mexico to the United Nations.

== Education ==
Born in Mexico City in 1951, de la Fuente graduated from the School of Medicine of the National Autonomous University in 1976 and trained in psychiatry at the Mayo Clinic in Rochester, Minnesota, United States. When he returned to Mexico he founded the Clinical Research Unit of the Mexican Institute of Psychiatry and joined the Faculty of UNAM's School of Medicine, where he was appointed dean in 1991. In 1995 he was also elected president of the Mexican Academy of Sciences and a few years later he was appointed secretary of health by President Zedillo. In 1999, he resigned his cabinet post to be appointed rector of the UNAM and in 2003 he was reappointed for a second term. In 2008 he was elected president of the International Association of Universities at UNESCO and was called by Ban Ki-moon to be member of the Council of the United Nations University in Tokyo. He sits on several boards in Mexico and abroad, such as El Universal, an influential newspaper in Mexico City. Also, in 2008 he was elected president of the International Association of Universities.

== Career ==
De la Fuente began his career as Secretary of Health under President Ernesto Zedillo from 1994 to 1999. During his tenure, he contributed significantly to Mexico's public health initiatives, particularly in addressing addiction and mental health challenges. He succeeded Jesús Kumate Rodríguez and was followed by José Antonio González Fernández.

From 1999 to 2007, de la Fuente served as the Rector of the National Autonomous University of Mexico (UNAM), one of Latin America's most prestigious universities. During his leadership, he focused on educational reforms and expanding the university's global presence.

In 2018, he was appointed Mexico's Permanent Representative to the United Nations, a position he held until 2023 under President Andrés Manuel López Obrador. In this role, he succeeded Juan José Ignacio Gómez Camacho and was later succeeded by Alicia Buenrostro Massieu.

=== Secretary of Foreign Affairs (2024–Present) ===
In 2024, de la Fuente was appointed Secretary of Foreign Affairs by President Claudia Sheinbaum, taking office on 1 October 2024, following the tenure of Alicia Bárcena Ibarra. He was confirmed by the Senate on 9 October 2024.

== Awards and recognition ==
He has written over two hundred papers and fourteen books, and has received numerous awards and honorary degrees such as the Distinguished Alumnus Award from the Mayo Clinic, the Presidential Award for Excellence of the University of Texas and a Doctorate of Humane Letters from Arizona State University, amongst many others. In 2006 he received from President Vicente Fox the National Prize for Arts and Sciences, the highest scientific recognition of Mexico's Government.
