= Pre-Columbian art =

Art of the Pre-Columbian civilizations

External videos
- Pre-Columbian Cup, Smarthistory at Khan Academy

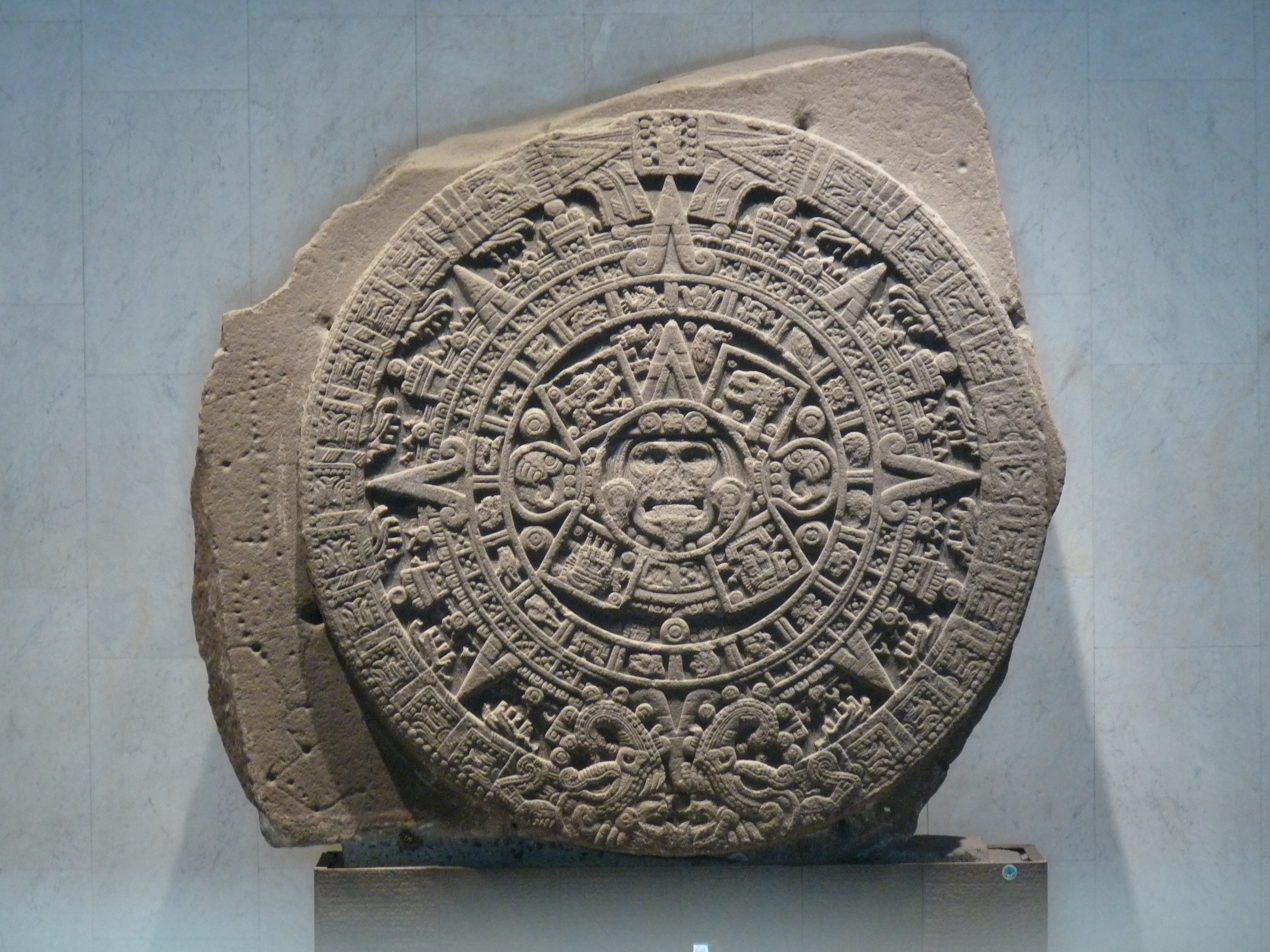
Sun Stone, at National Anthropology Museum in Mexico City

Pre-Columbian art refers to the visual arts of indigenous peoples of the Caribbean, North, Central, and South Americas from at least 13,000 BCE to the European conquests starting in the late 15th and early 16th centuries. The pre-Columbian era continued for a time after these in many places, or had a transitional phase afterwards. Many types of perishable artifacts that were once very common, such as woven textiles, typically have not been preserved, but Precolumbian monumental sculpture, metalwork in gold, pottery, and painting on ceramics, walls, and rocks have survived more frequently.

The first pre-Columbian art to be widely known in modern times was that of the empires flourishing at the time of European conquest, the Inca and Aztec, some of which was taken back to Europe intact. Gradually art of earlier civilizations that had already collapsed, especially Maya art and Olmec art, became widely known, mostly for their large stone sculpture.

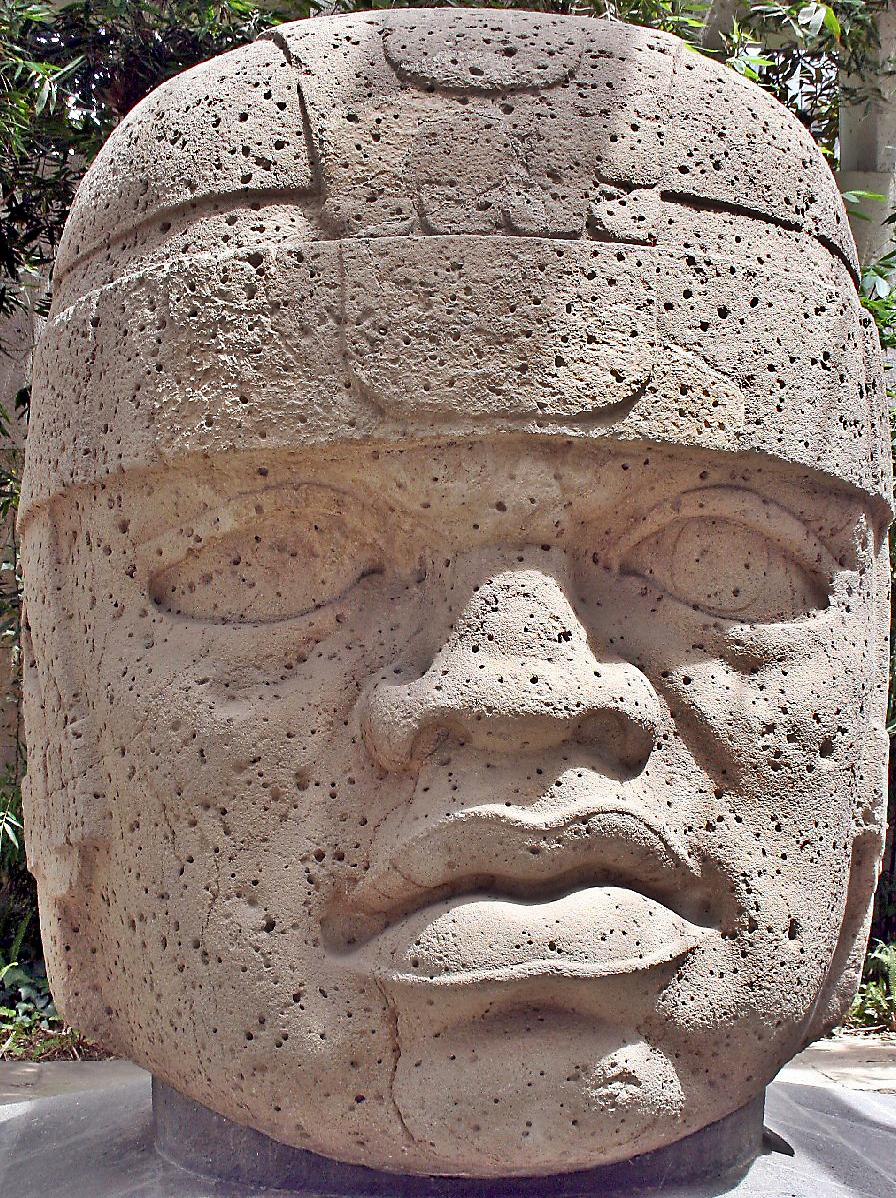
Colossal Olmec head N° 1 of San Lorenzo, Mexico

Many pre-Columbian cultures did not have writing systems, so visual art expressed cosmologies, world views, religion, and philosophy of these cultures, as well as serving as mnemonic devices. Artisans of the Ancient Americas drew upon a wide range of materials (obsidian, gold, spondylus shells), creating objects that included the meanings held to be inherent to the materials. These cultures often derived value from the physical qualities, rather than the imagery, of artworks, prizing aural and tactile features, the quality of workmanship, and the rarity of materials. Various works of art have been discovered large distances from their location of production, indicating that many pre-Columbian civilizations interacted amongst each other. Many societies used raw materials carried from far away, suggesting difficulty of acquisition as a source of value.

For many of these cultures, the visual arts went beyond physical appearance and served as active extensions of their owners and indices of the divine.

== Mesoamerica ==
The Mesoamerican cultures are generally divided into three periods (see Mesoamerican chronology):

- Pre-classic (up to 200 CE)
- Classic (ca. 200–900 CE)
- Post-classic (ca. 900 to 1580 CE).

The Pre-classic period was dominated by the highly developed Olmec civilization, which flourished around 1200–400 BCE. The Olmecs produced jade figurines, and created heavy-featured, colossal heads, up to 2 meters (6.6 ft) high, that still stand mysteriously in the landscape. The Mesoamerican tradition of building large ceremonial centres appears to have begun under the Olmecs.

During the Classic period the dominant civilization was the Maya. Maya royalty commissioned artwork that commemorated their achievements and secured their place in time. Scenes depicting various rituals and historical events are embedded with hieroglyphic text to enable the viewer to identify the important figures, times and places instead of relying upon physical features that could be forgotten over time. The interpretation of the actions represented in the artwork goes hand in hand with understanding the decorative text that is woven into the picture. Unlocking this hieroglyphic text is vital as it removes anonymity and mystery from the scenes and reveals detailed records of those who held power throughout the timeline of the civilization. Like the Mississippian peoples of North America such as the Choctaw and Natchez, the Maya organized themselves into large, agricultural communities. They practised their own forms of hieroglyphic writing and even advanced astronomy. Mayan art consequently focuses on rain, agriculture, and fertility, expressing these images mainly in relief and surface decoration, as well as some sculpture. Glyphs and stylized figures were used to decorate architecture such as the pyramid temple of Chichén Itzá. Murals dating from about 750 CE were discovered when the city of Bonampak was excavated in 1946.

The Post-classic period (10th–12th centuries) was dominated by the Toltecs who made colossal, block-like sculptures such as those employed as free-standing columns at Tula, Mexico. The Mixtecs developed a style of painting known as Mixtec-Puebla, as seen in their murals and codices (manuscripts), in which all available space is covered by flat figures in geometric designs. The Aztec culture in Mexico produced some dramatically expressive artworks, such as the decorated skulls of captives and stone sculpture, of which Tlazolteotl (Woods Bliss Collection, Washington), a goddess in childbirth, is a good example. Aztec art, similar to other Mesoamerican cultures also focused on deity worship and portraying values in their society. In creating their art, Aztecs also were interested in naturalism, as making something life-like better conveyed their message through the artwork. For example, the Eagle Warrior statues are life-sized ceramic sculptures that show this sense of naturalism. The Aztecs believed these eagle warriors showed the value of youthful beauty, this can be seen in the sculpture with the Warriors young and soft features of his face.

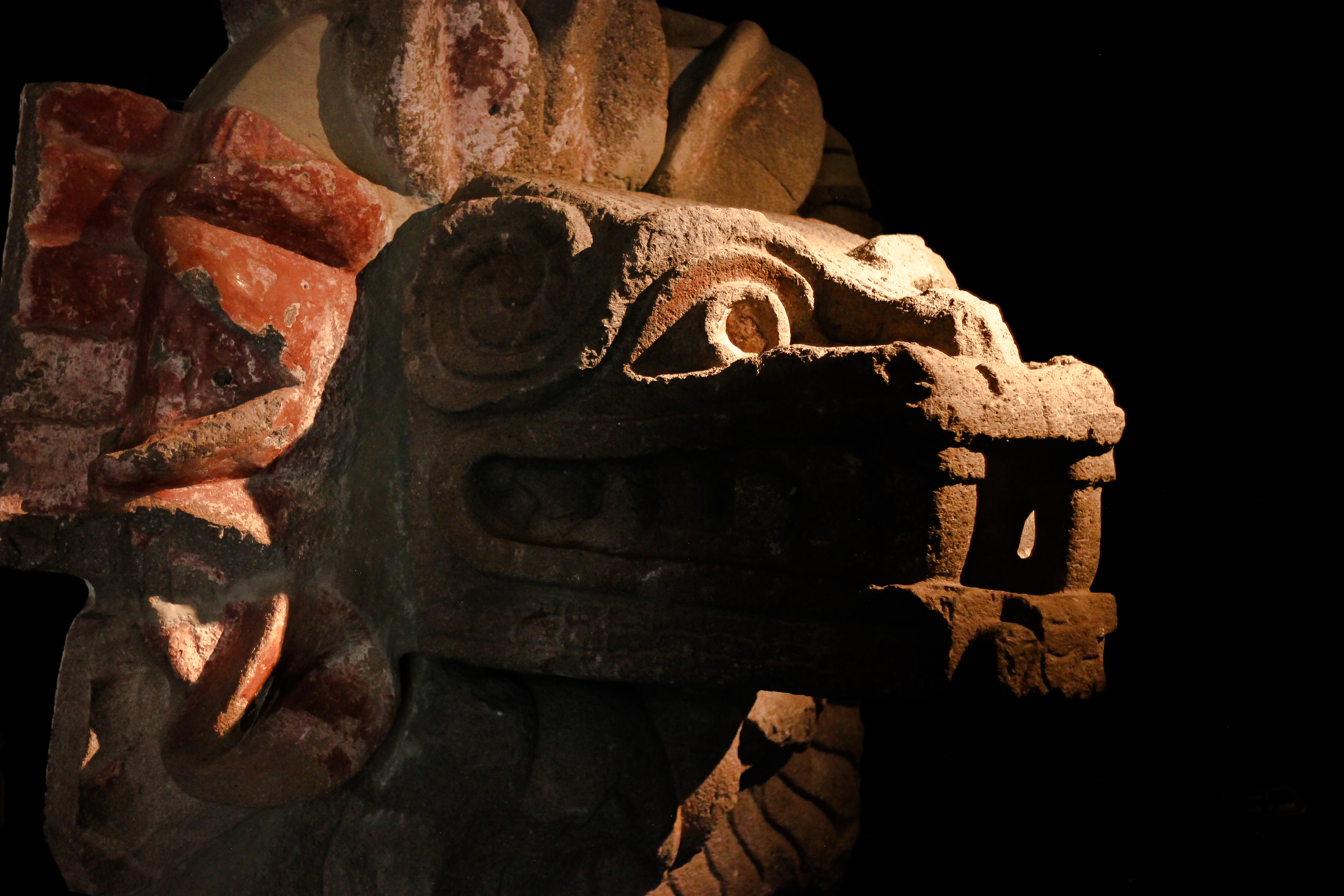
Feathered serpent sculpture in Teotihuacan

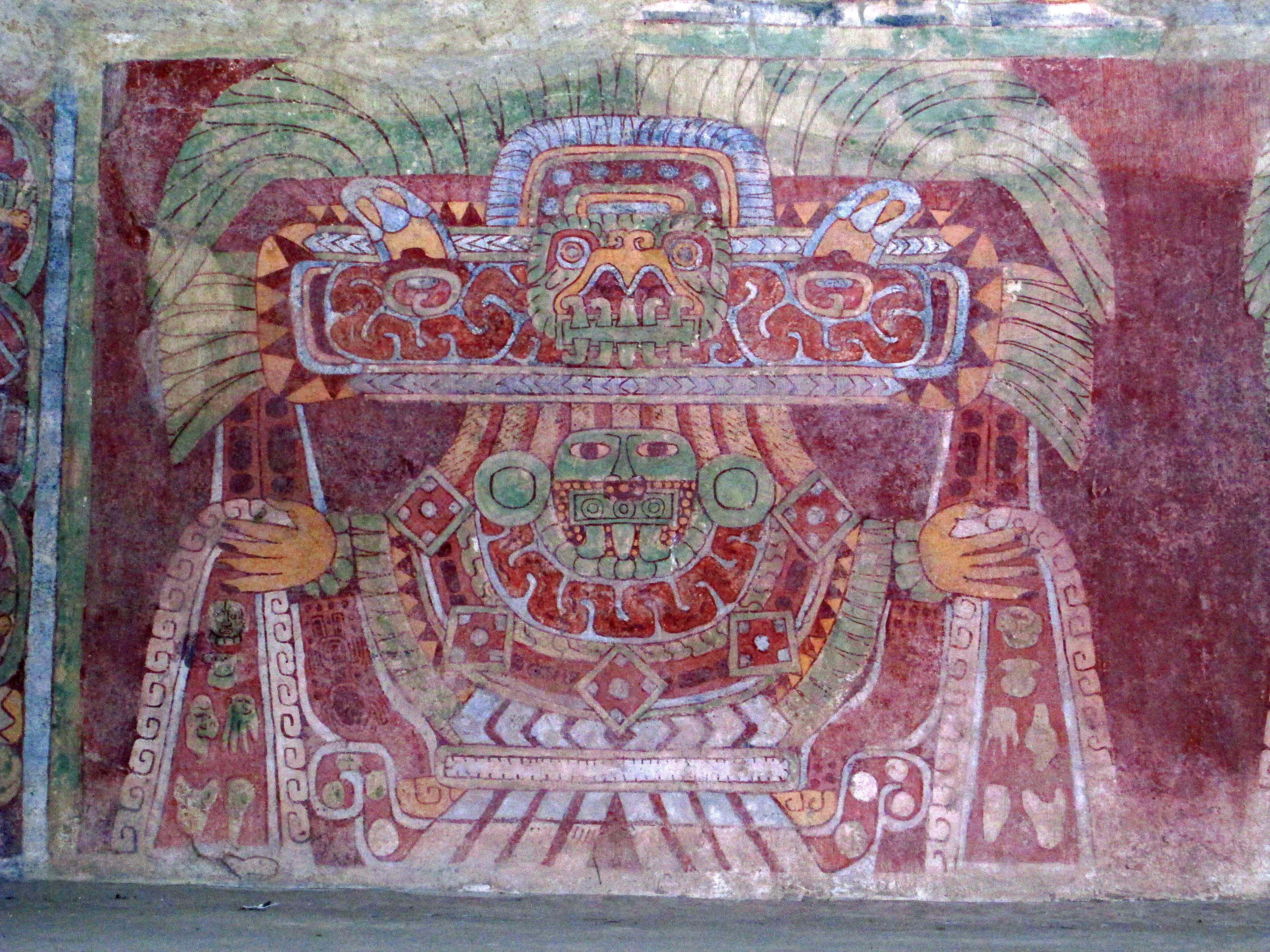
Mural in Tetitla, Teotihuacan

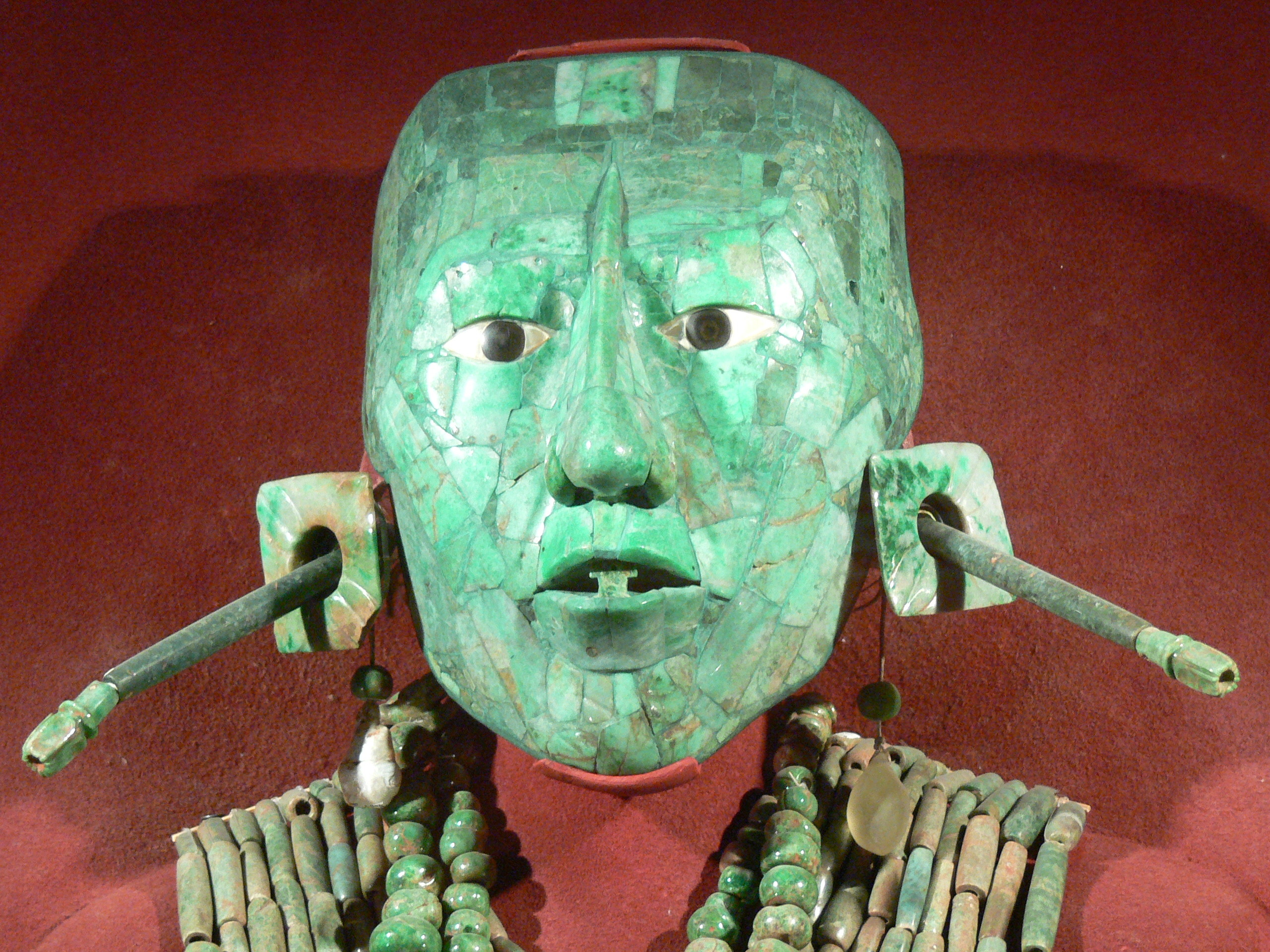
Mortuary mask of K'inich Janaab' Pakal

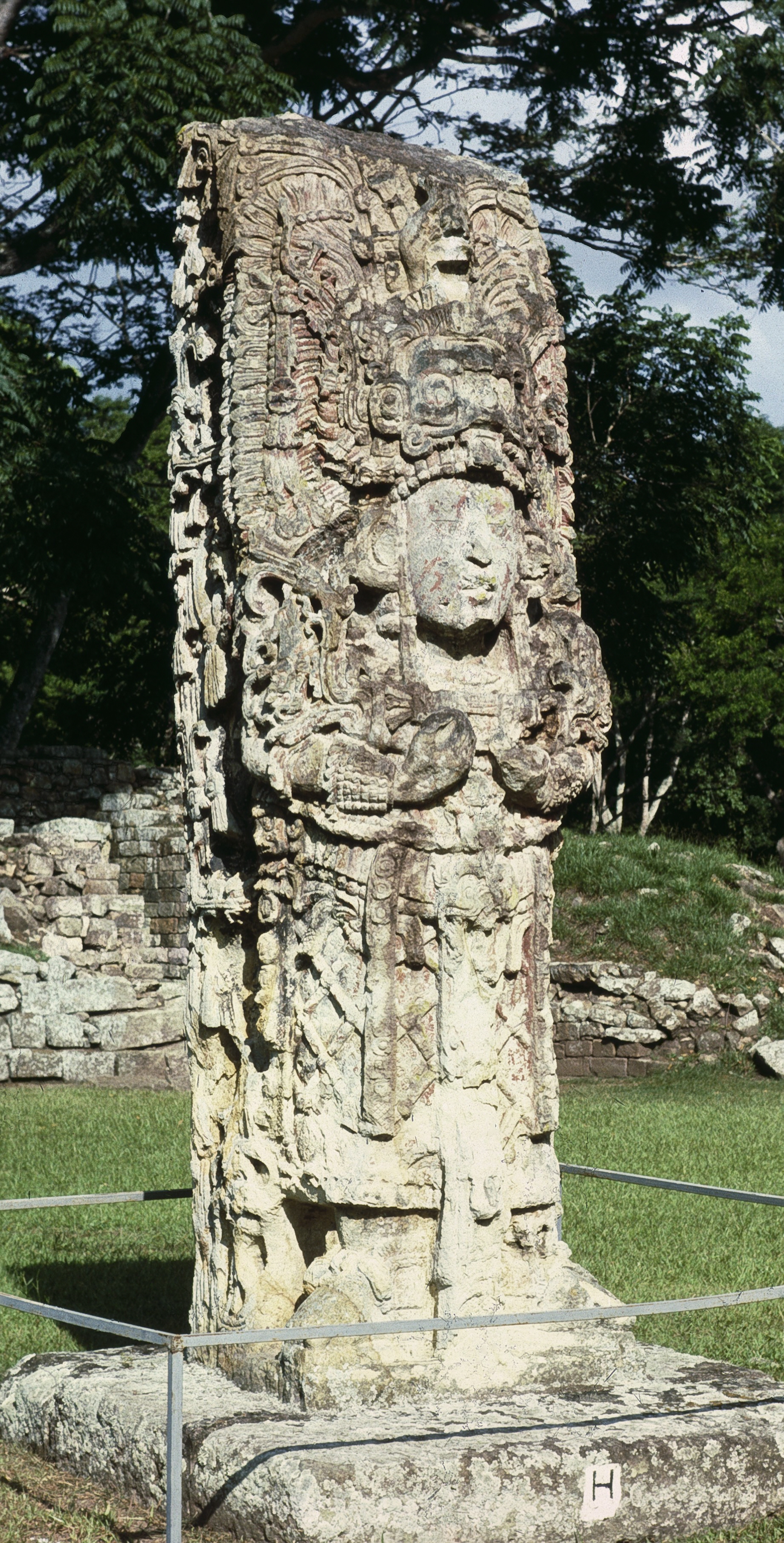
Stele H, Copán

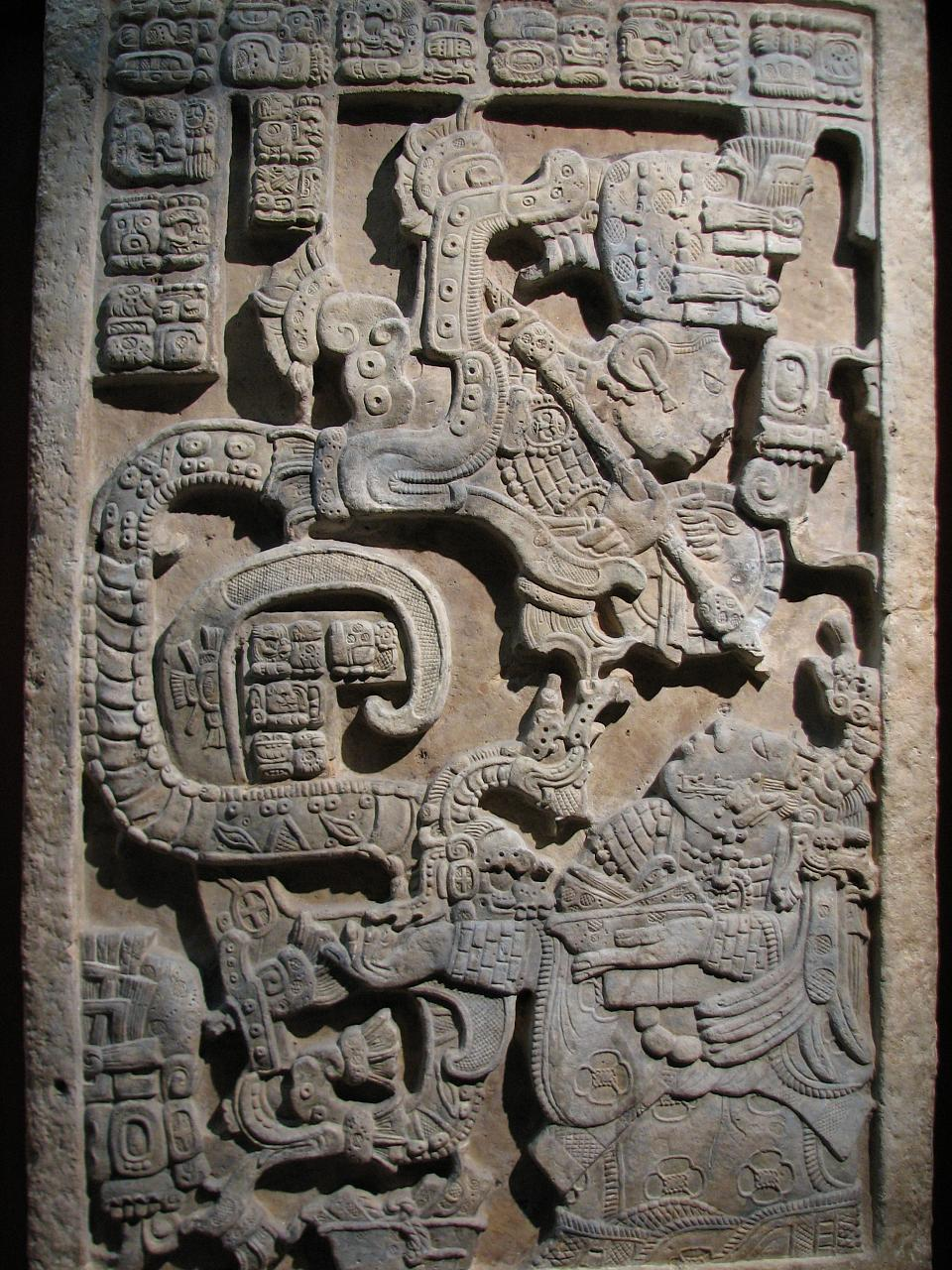
Lintel 25, Yaxchilan

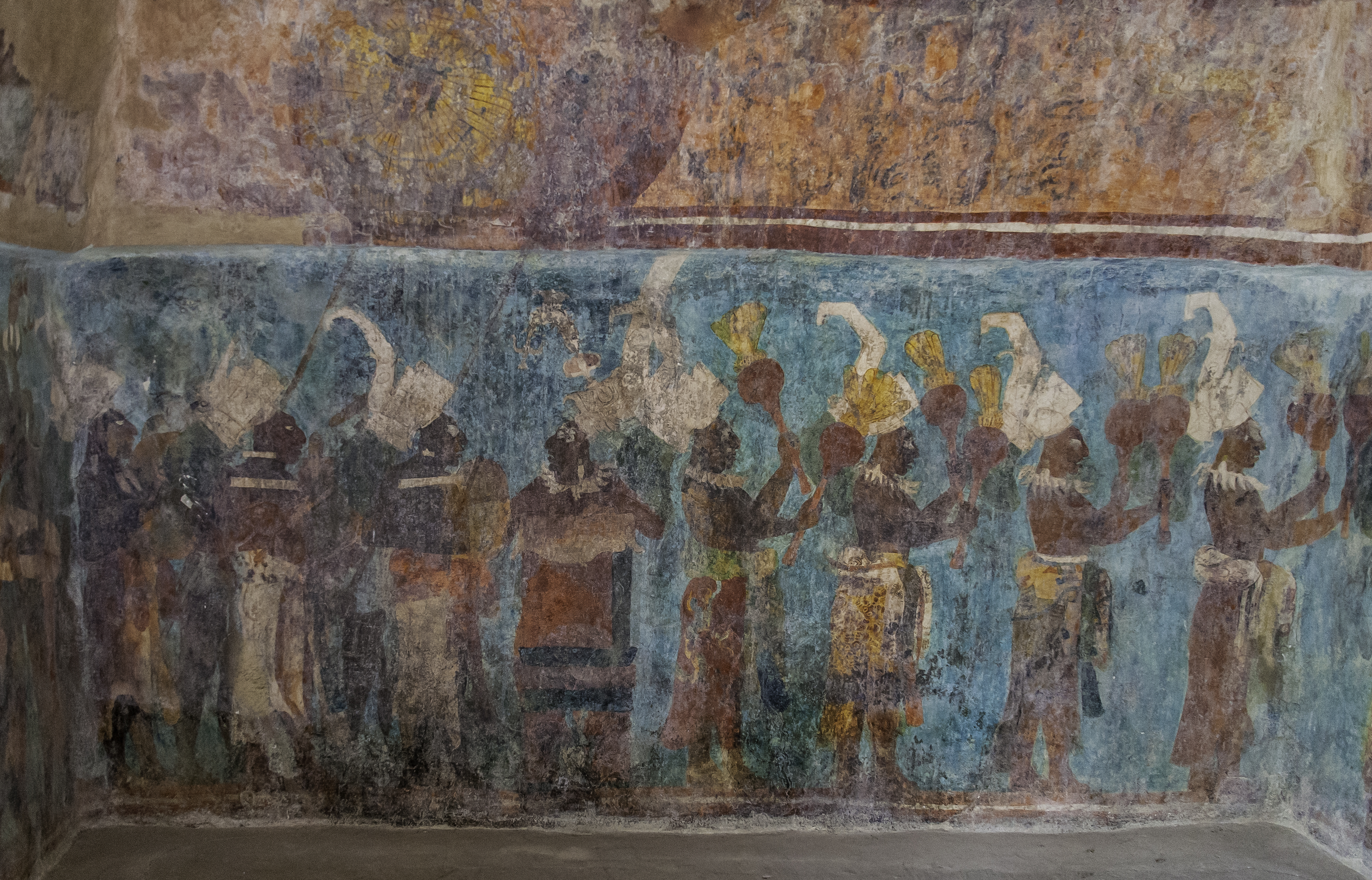
Mural of the Structure 1 in Bonampak

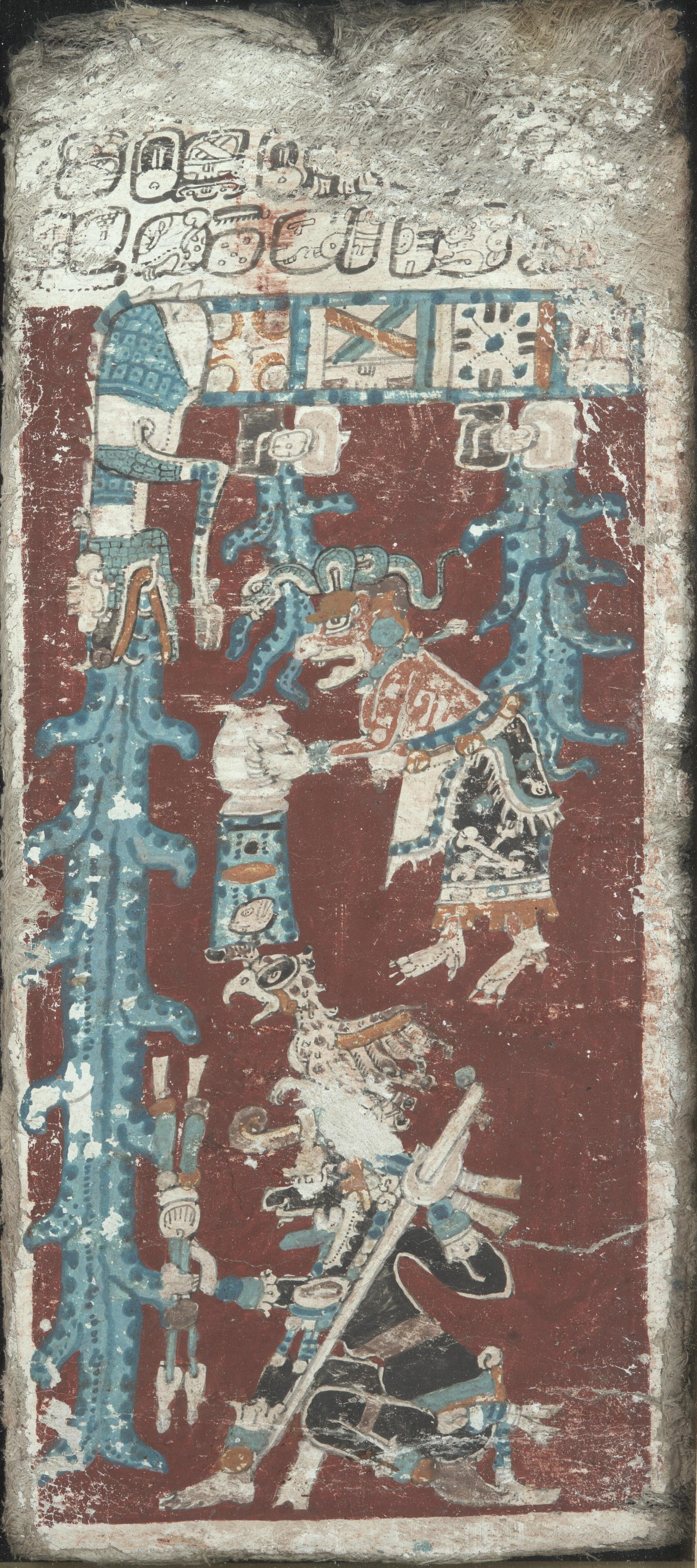
Dresden Codex page 74

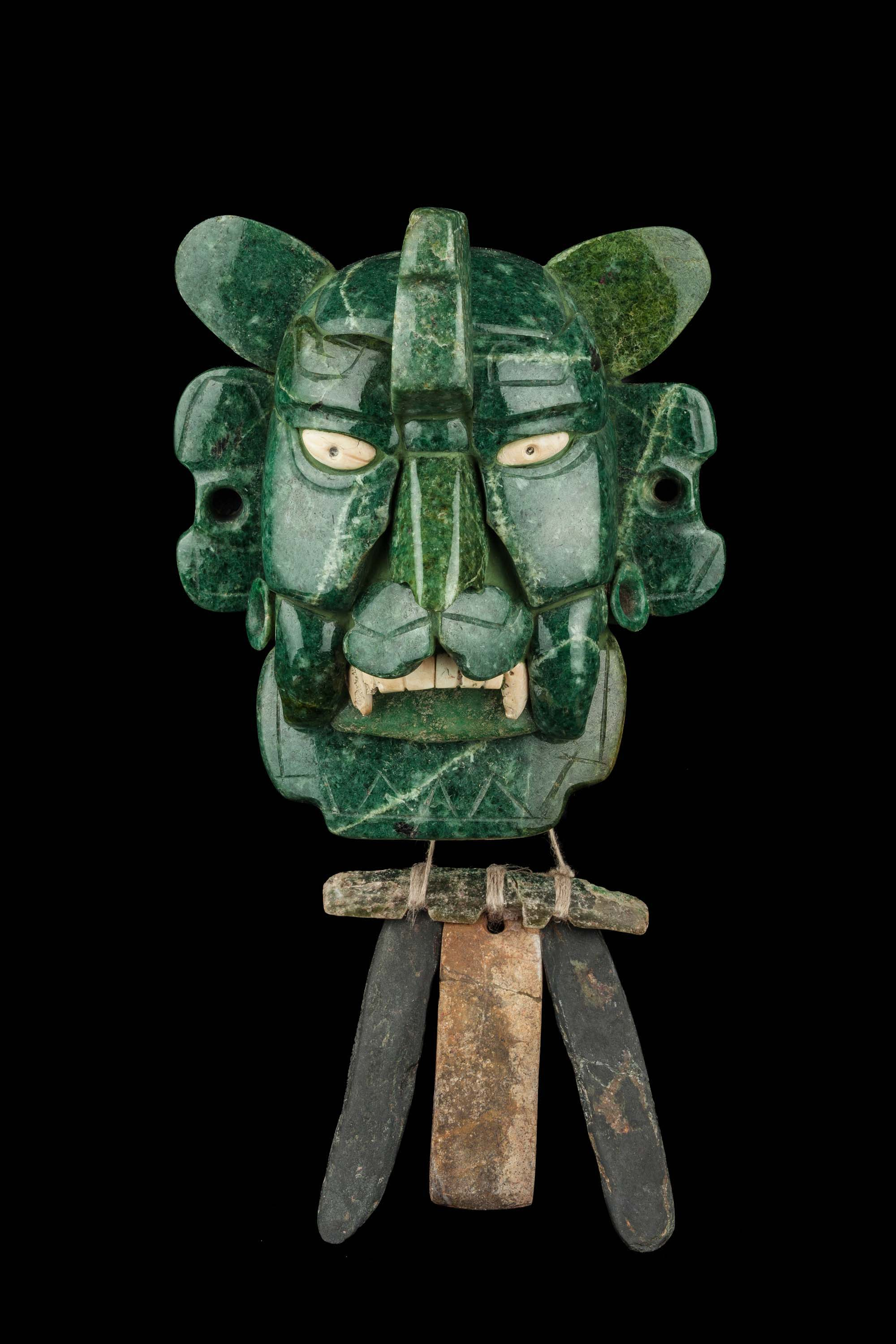
Zapotec mosaic mask that represents a Bat god, made of 25 pieces of jade, with yellow eyes made of shell. It was found in a tomb at Monte Albán

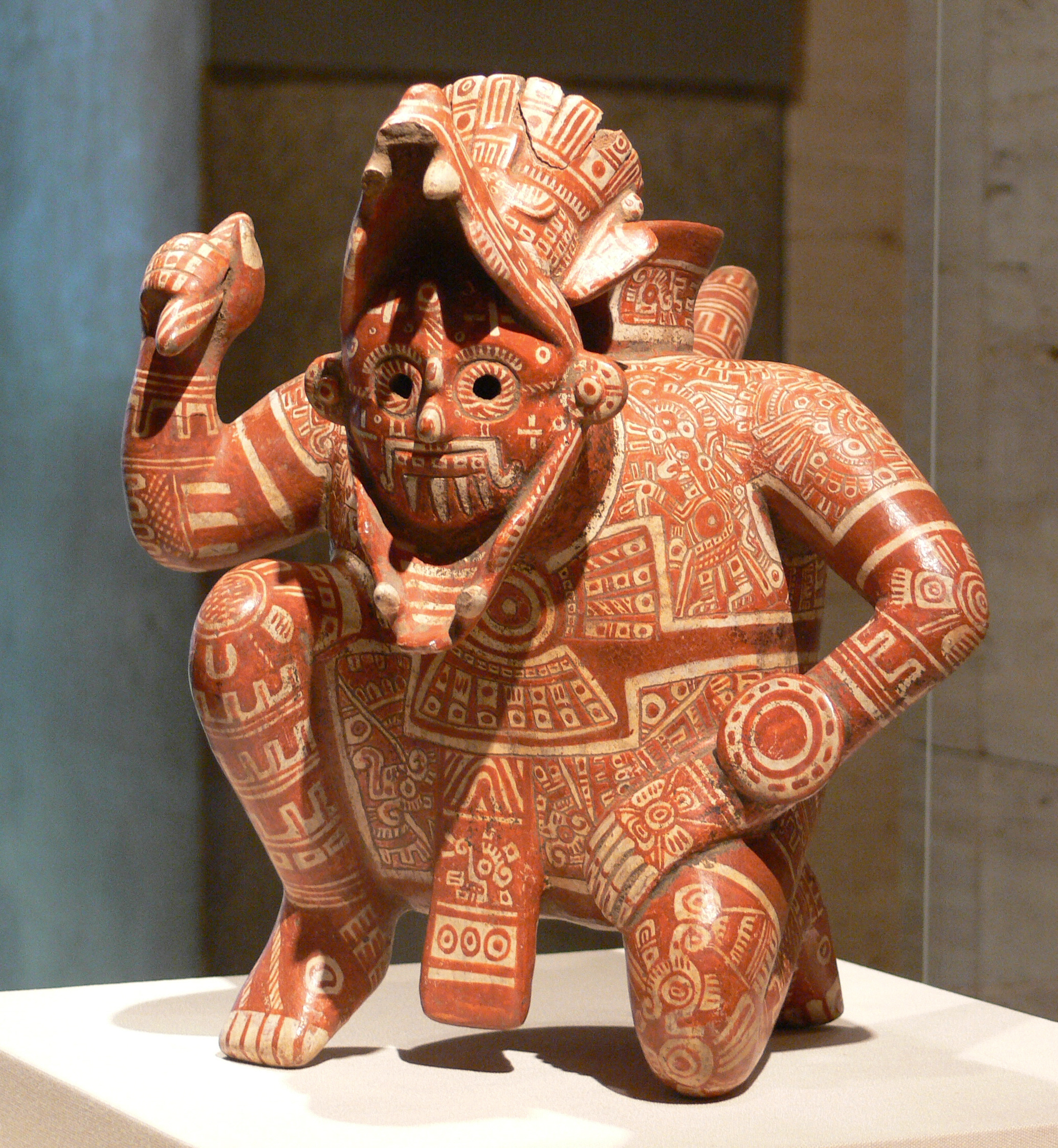
Mixtec ceramic

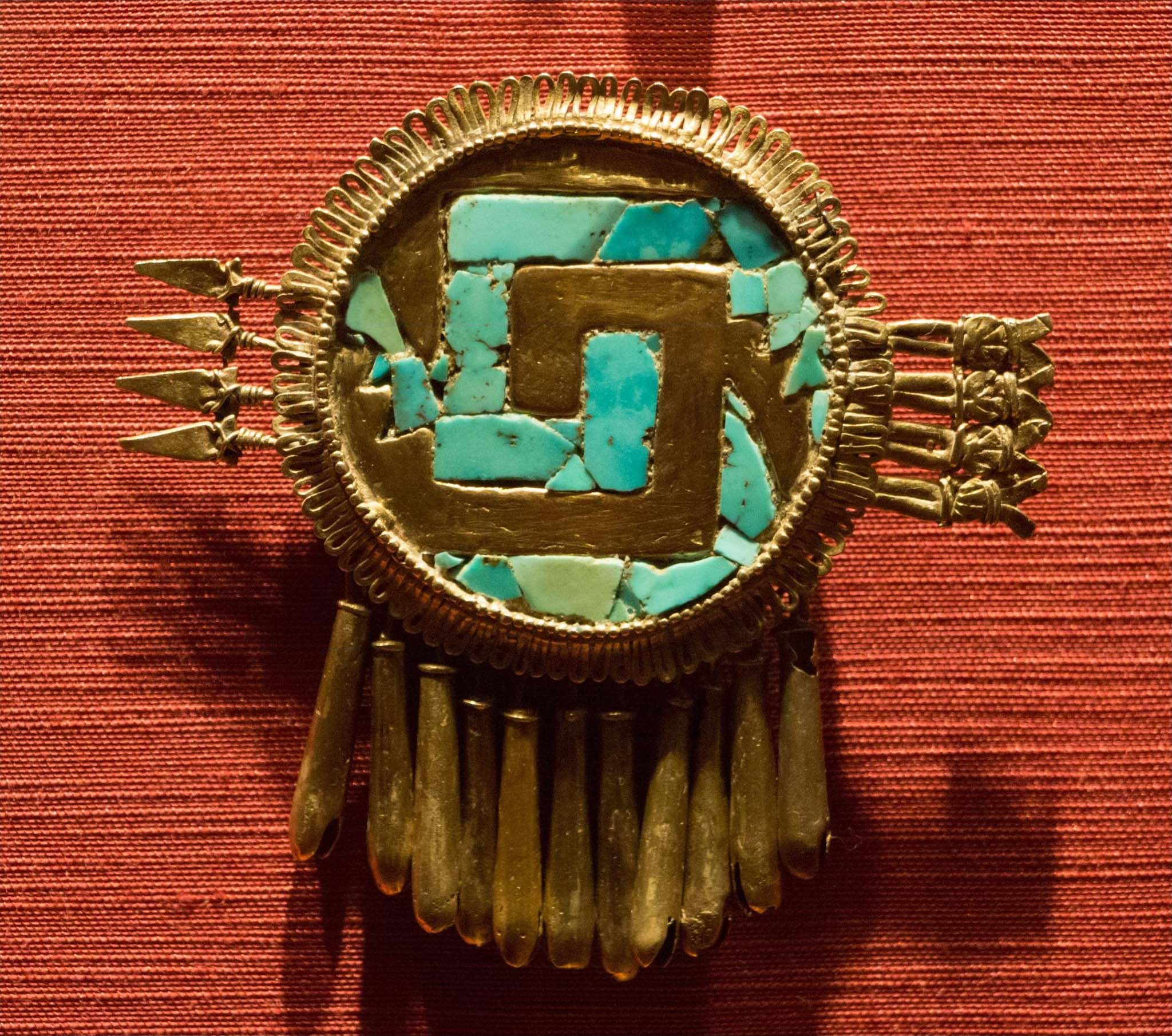
Mixtec pectoral of gold and turquoise, Shield of Yanhuitlan

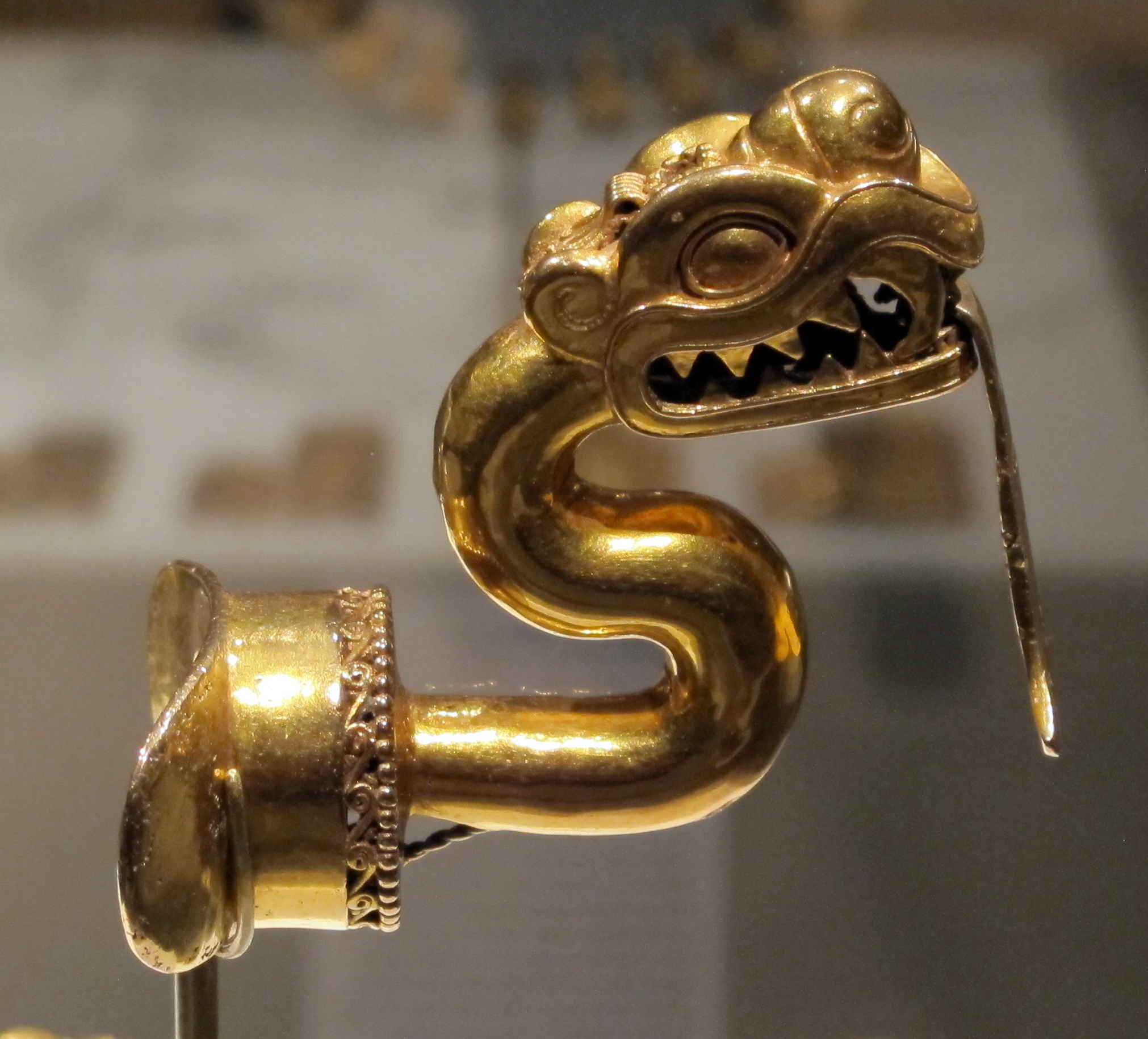
Serpent labret with articulated tongue, in the Metropolitan Museum of Art

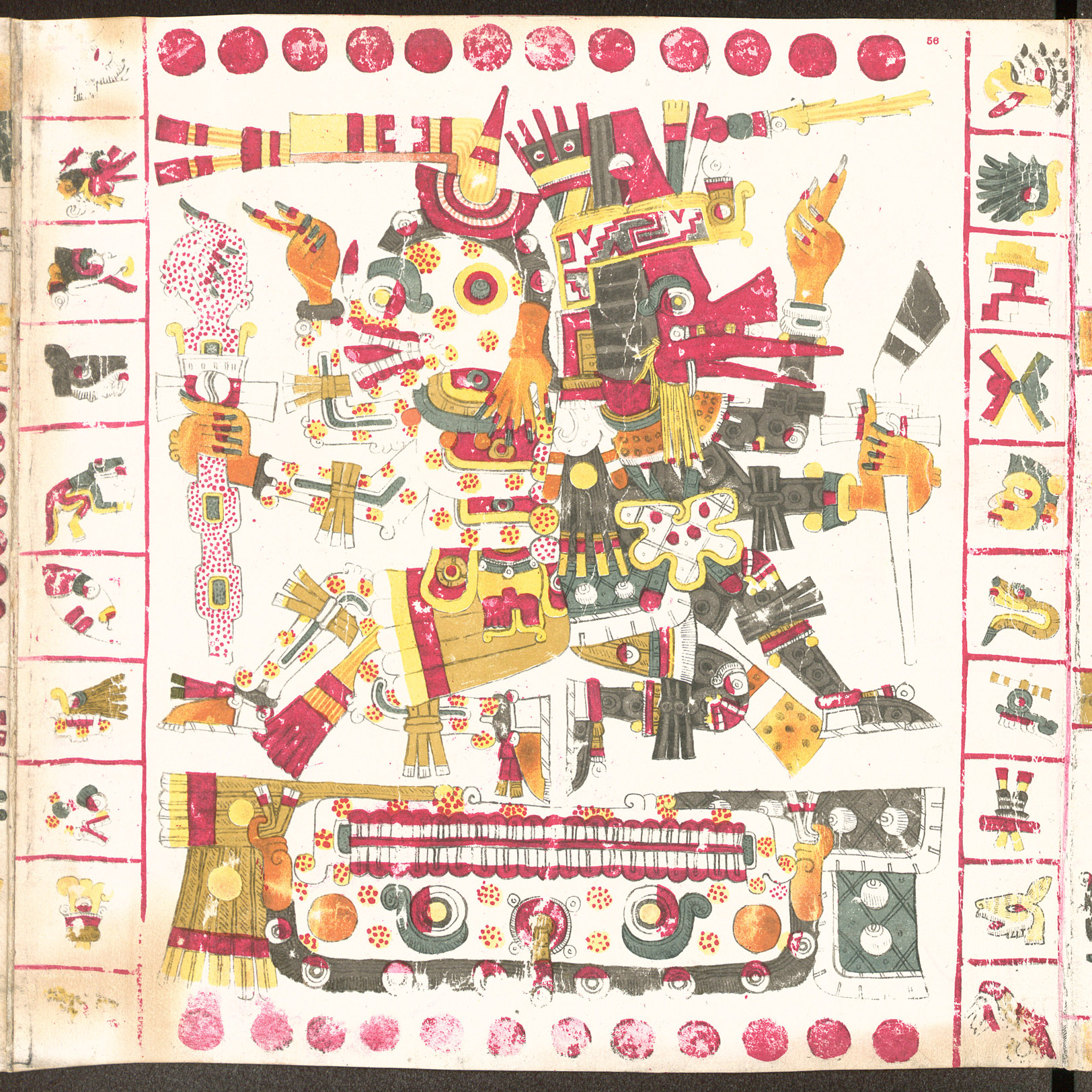
Codex Borgia page 56, showing to Mictlāntēcutli and Quetzalcoatl

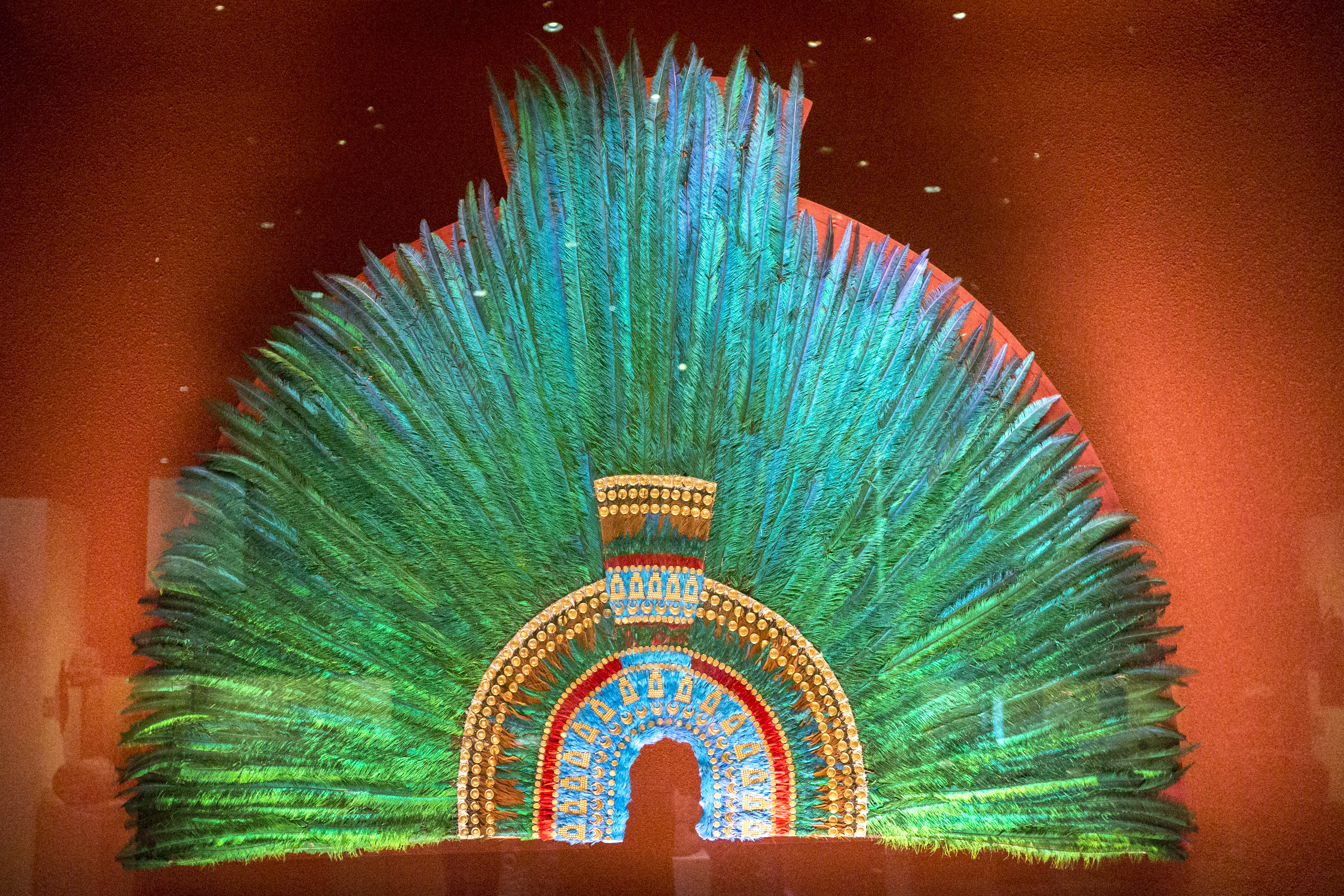
Feather headdress of Moctezuma II

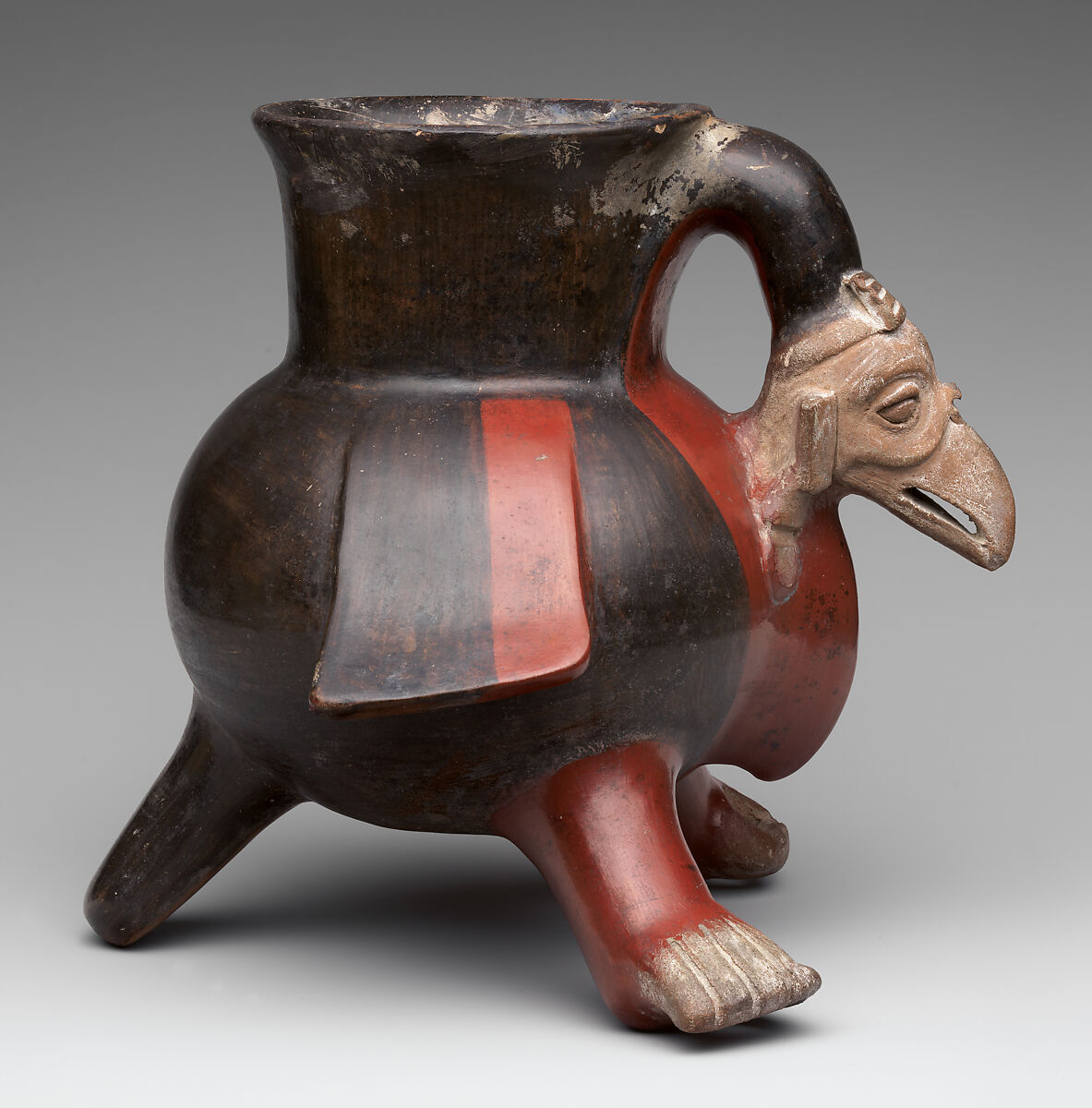
Aztec vulture vessel in the Metropolitan Museum of Art. 1200-1521.

== South America ==
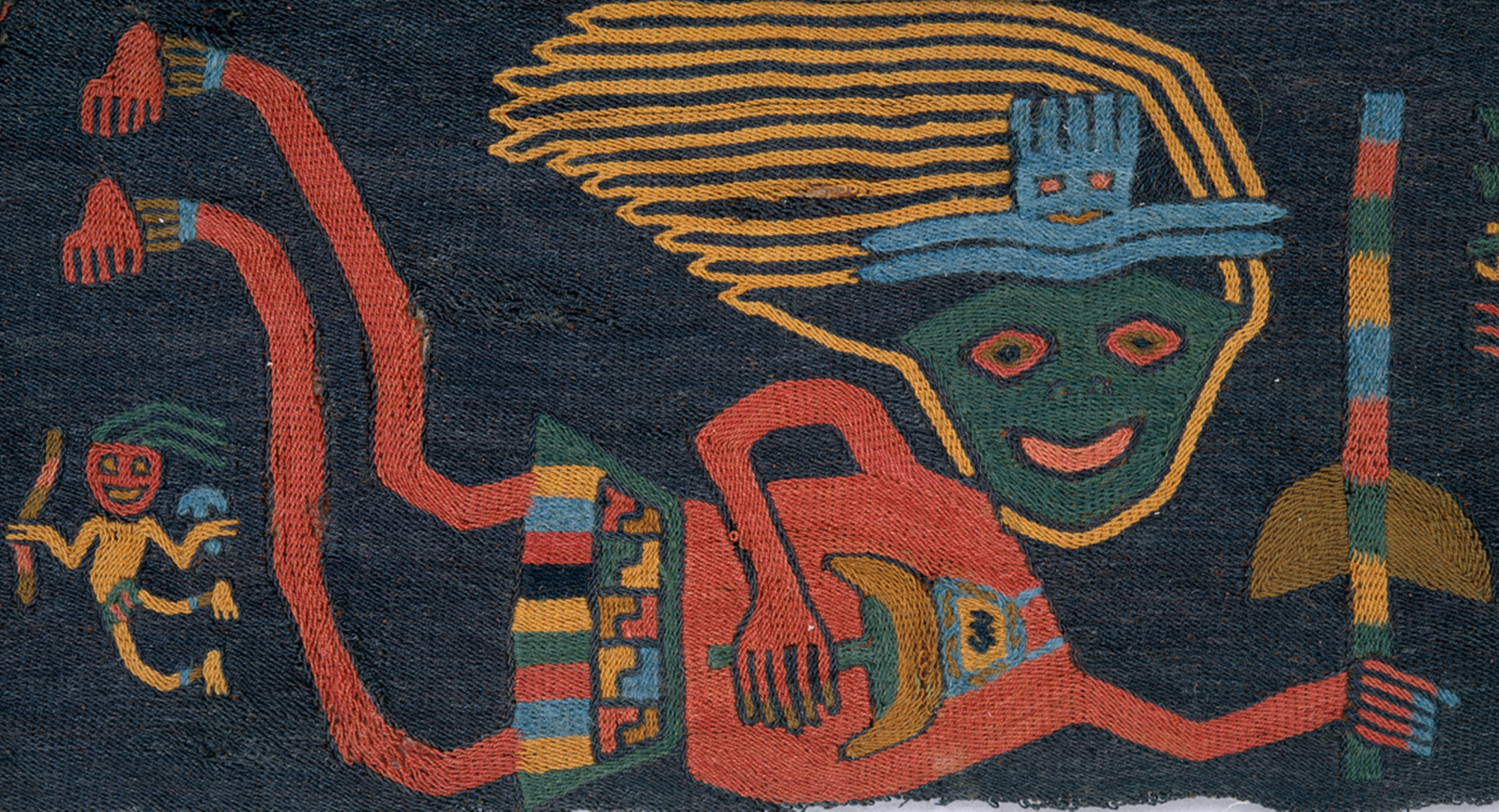
Paracas culture border, flying man detail. This is a famous motif from the Paracas Necropolis burial textiles. It dates to 450–175 BCE but is in pristine condition. The field of view is about 10 inches (25.4 cm) wide. The Entire textile can be viewed at the Metropolitan Museum website.

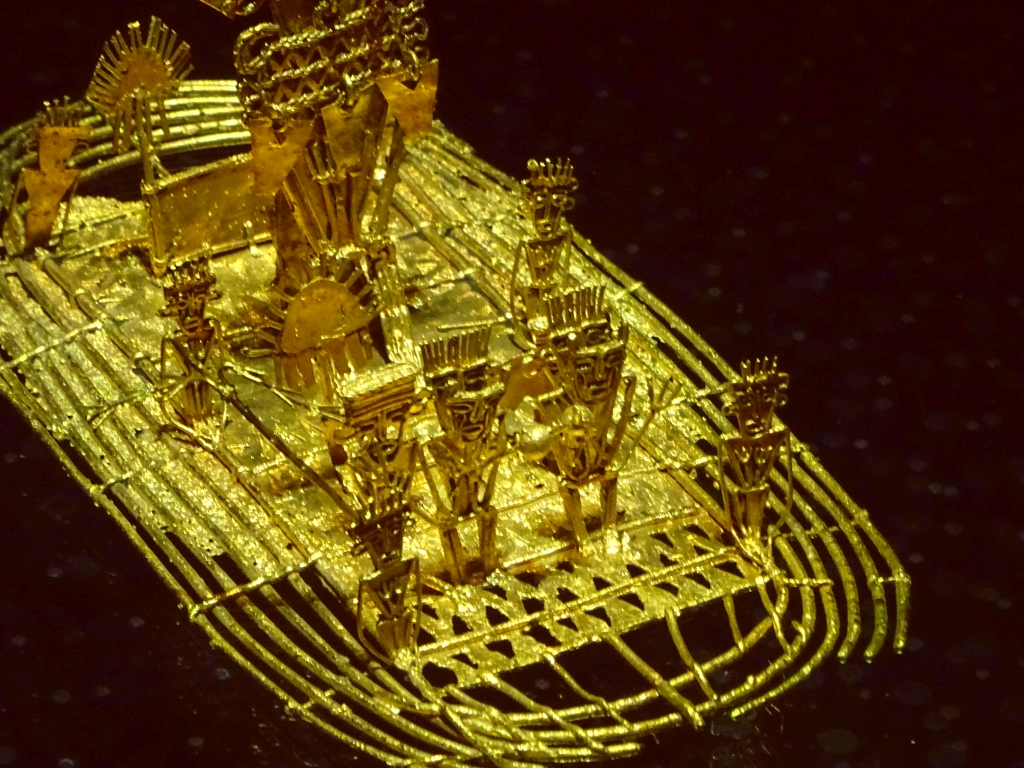
The gold Muisca raft in the Museo del Oro, Bogotá

In the central Peruvian Andes, the Chavín civilization flourished from around 1000 BCE to 300 BCE. The Chavín produced small-scale pottery, often human in shape but with animal features such as bird feet, reptilian eyes, or feline fangs. Representations of jaguar are a common theme in Chavín art. The Chavin culture is also noted for the spectacular murals and carvings found its main religious site of Chavín de Huantar; these works include the Raimondi Stele, the Lanzón, and the Tello Obelisk.

Contemporary with the Chavín was the Paracas culture of the southern coast of Peru, most noted today for their elaborate textiles. These amazing productions, some of which could measure ninety feet long, were primarily used for as burial wraps for Paracas mummy bundles. Paracas art was greatly influenced by the Chavín cult, and the two styles share many common motifs.

On the south coast, the Paracas were immediately succeeded by a flowering of artistic production around the Nazca river valley. The Nazca period is divided into eight ceramic phases, each one depicting increasingly abstract animal and human motifs. These period range from Phase 1, beginning around 200 CE, to Phase 8, which declined in the middle of the eighth century. The Nasca people are most famous for the Nazca Lines, though they are usually regarded as making some of the most beautiful polychrome ceramics in the Andes.

On the north coast, the Moche succeeded the Chavín. The Moche flourished about 100–800 CE, and were among the best artisans of the pre-Columbian world, producing delightful portrait vases (Moche ware), which, while realistic, are steeped in religious references, the significance of which is now lost. For the Moche, ceramics functioned as a primary way of disseminating information and cultural ideas. The Moche made ceramic vessels that depicted and re-created a plethora of objects: fruits, plants, animals, human portraits, gods, demons, as well as graphic depictions of sexual acts. The Moche are also noted for their metallurgy (such as that found in the tomb of the Lord of Sipán), as well as their architectural prowess, such as the Huaca de la Luna and the Huaca del Sol in the Moche River valley.

Following the decline of the Moche, two large co-existing empires emerged in the Andes region. In the north, the Wari (or Huari) Empire, based in their capital city of the same name. The Wari are noted for their stone architecture and sculpture accomplishments, but their greatest proficiency was ceramic. The Wari produced magnificent large ceramics, many of which depicted images of the Staff God, an important deity in the Andes which during the Wari period had become specifically associated with the Lake Titicaca region on the modern Peru-Bolivia border. Similarly, the Wari's contemporaries of the Tiwanaku empire, also centered around a capital city of the same name, held the Staff God in similar esteem. Tiwanaku's empire began to expand out of Titicaca around 400 BCE, but its "Classic Period" of artistic production and political power occurred between 375 and 700 CE. Tiwanaku is currently known for its magnificent imperial city on the southern side of Lake Titicaca, now in modern-day Bolivia. Especially famous is the Gate of the Sun, which depicts a large image of the Staff God flanked by other religious symbols which may have functioned as a calendar.

Following the decline of the Wari Empire in the late first millennium, the Chimú people, centered out of their capital city of Chimor began to build their empire on the north and central coasts of Peru. The Chimú were preceded by a simple ceramic style known as Sicán (700–900 CE) which became increasingly decorative until it became recognizable as Chimú in the early second millennium. The Chimú produced excellent portrait and decorative works in metal, notably gold but especially silver. The Chimú also are noted for their featherwork, having produced many standards and headdresses made of a variety of tropical feathers which were fashioned into bird and fish designs, both of which were held in high esteem by the Chimú. The Chimú are best known for their magnificent palatial complex of Chan Chan just south of modern-day Trujillo, Peru; now a UNESCO World Heritage Site. The Chimú went into decline very quickly due to outside pressures and conquest from the expanding Inca Empire in the mid-15th century.

At the time of the Spanish conquest, the Inca Empire (Tawantinsuyu in Quechua, the "Land of the Four Quarters") was the largest and wealthiest empire in the world, and this was depicted in their art. Most Inca sculpture was melted down by the invading Spanish, so most of what remains today is in the form of architecture, textiles, and ceramics. The Inca valued gold among all other metals, and equated it with the sun god Inti. Some Inca buildings in the capital of Cusco were literally covered in gold, and most contained many gold and silver sculptures. Most art was abstract in nature. Inca ceramics were primarily large vessels covered in geometric designs. Inca tunics and textiles contained similar motifs, often checkerboard patterns reserved for the Inca elite and the Inca army. Today, due to the unpopularity of abstract art and the lack of Inca gold and silver sculpture, the Inca are best known for the architecture – specifically the complex of Machu Picchu just northwest of Cusco. Inca architecture makes use of large stone blocks, each one cut specifically to fit around the other blocks in a wall. These stones were cut with such precision that the Incas did not need to make use of mortar to hold their buildings together. Even without mortar, Inca buildings still stand today; they form many of the foundations for even modern-day buildings in Cusco and the surrounding area. The Incas produced thousands of large stone structures, among them forts, temples, and palaces, even though the Inca Empire lasted for only 95 years.

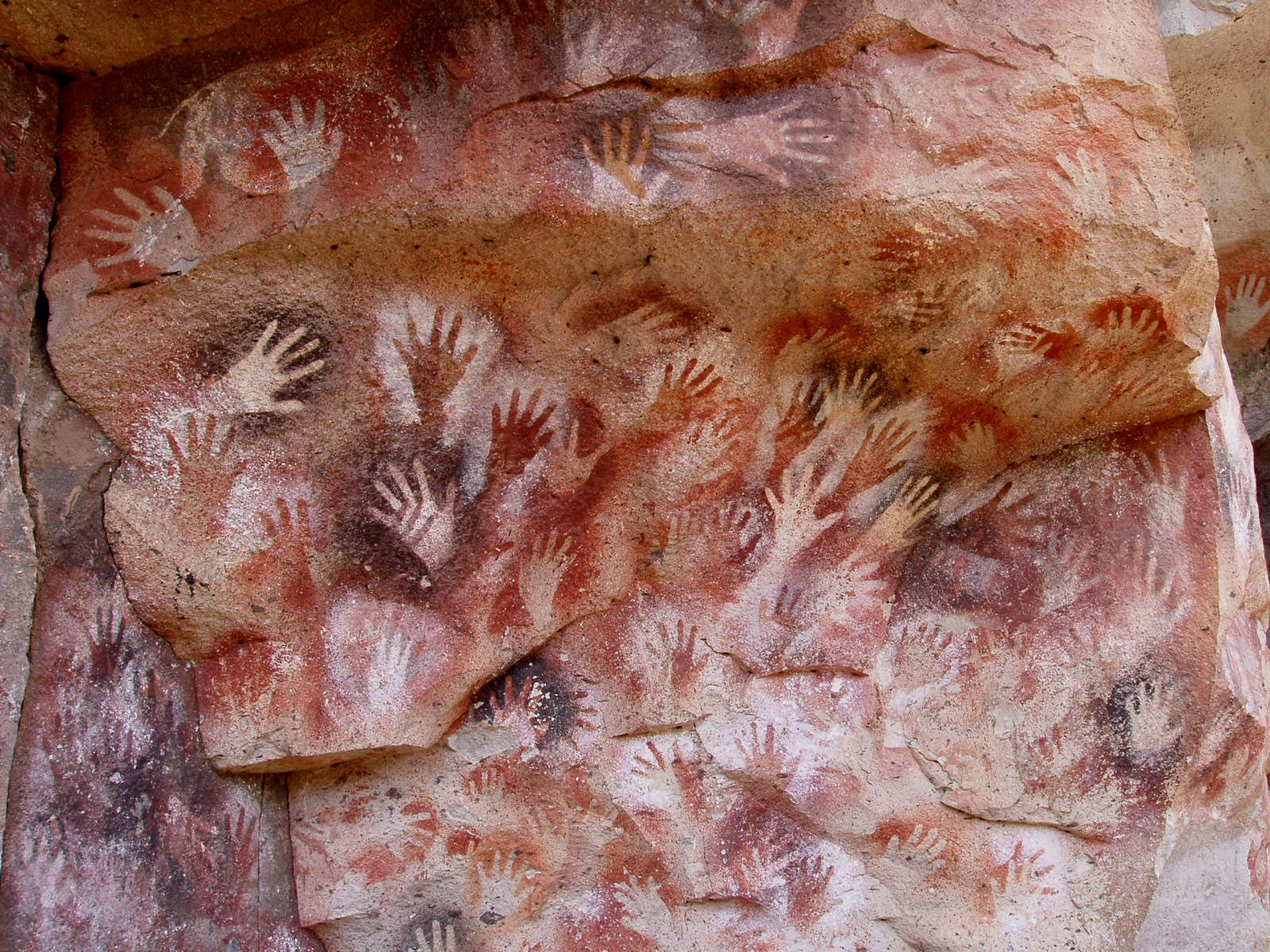
Cueva de las Manos located in Argentina. The art in the cave dates between 13,000–9,000 BP.

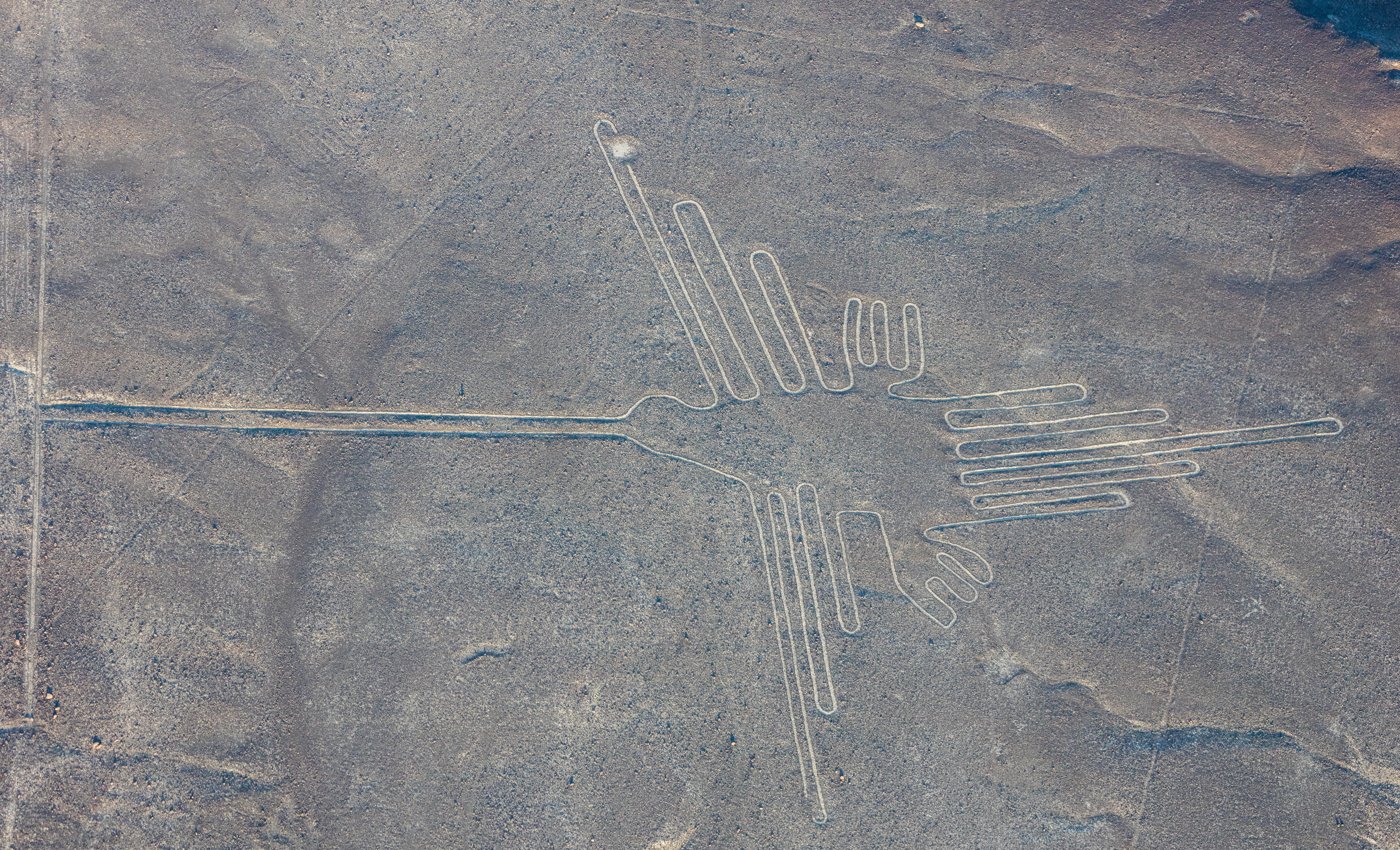
Geoglyphs in the Nazca desert

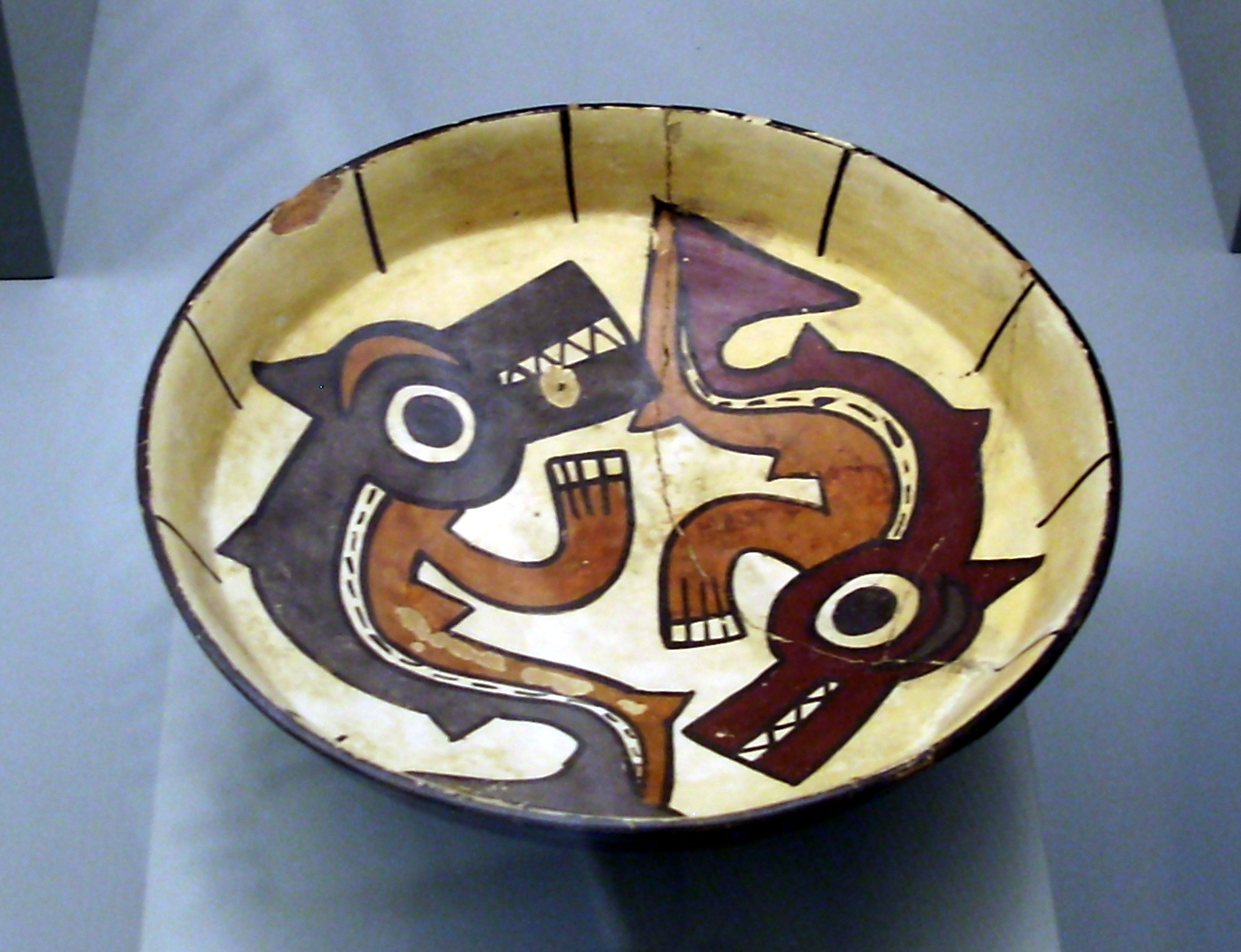
Nazca ceramic

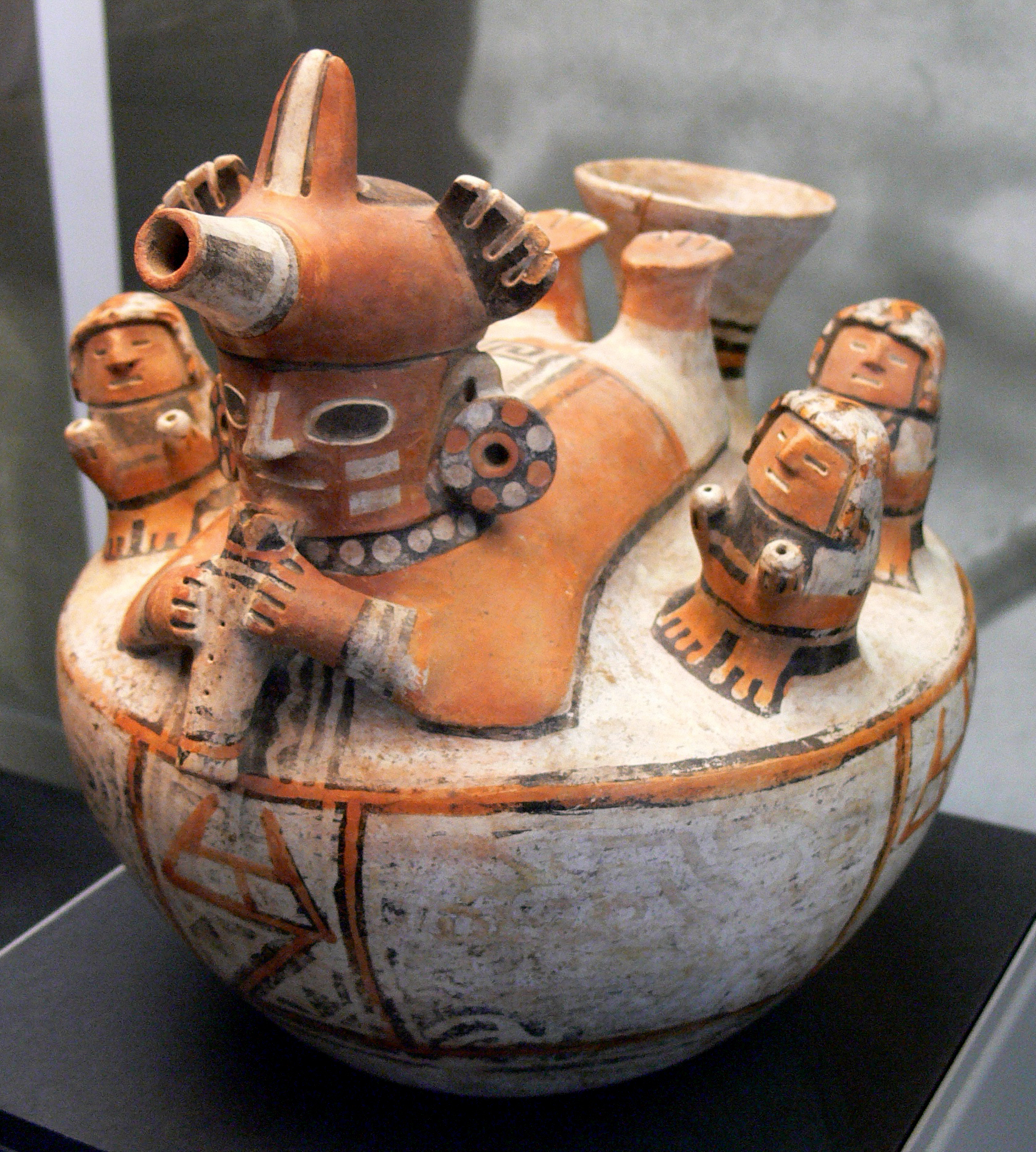
Recuay culture ceramic

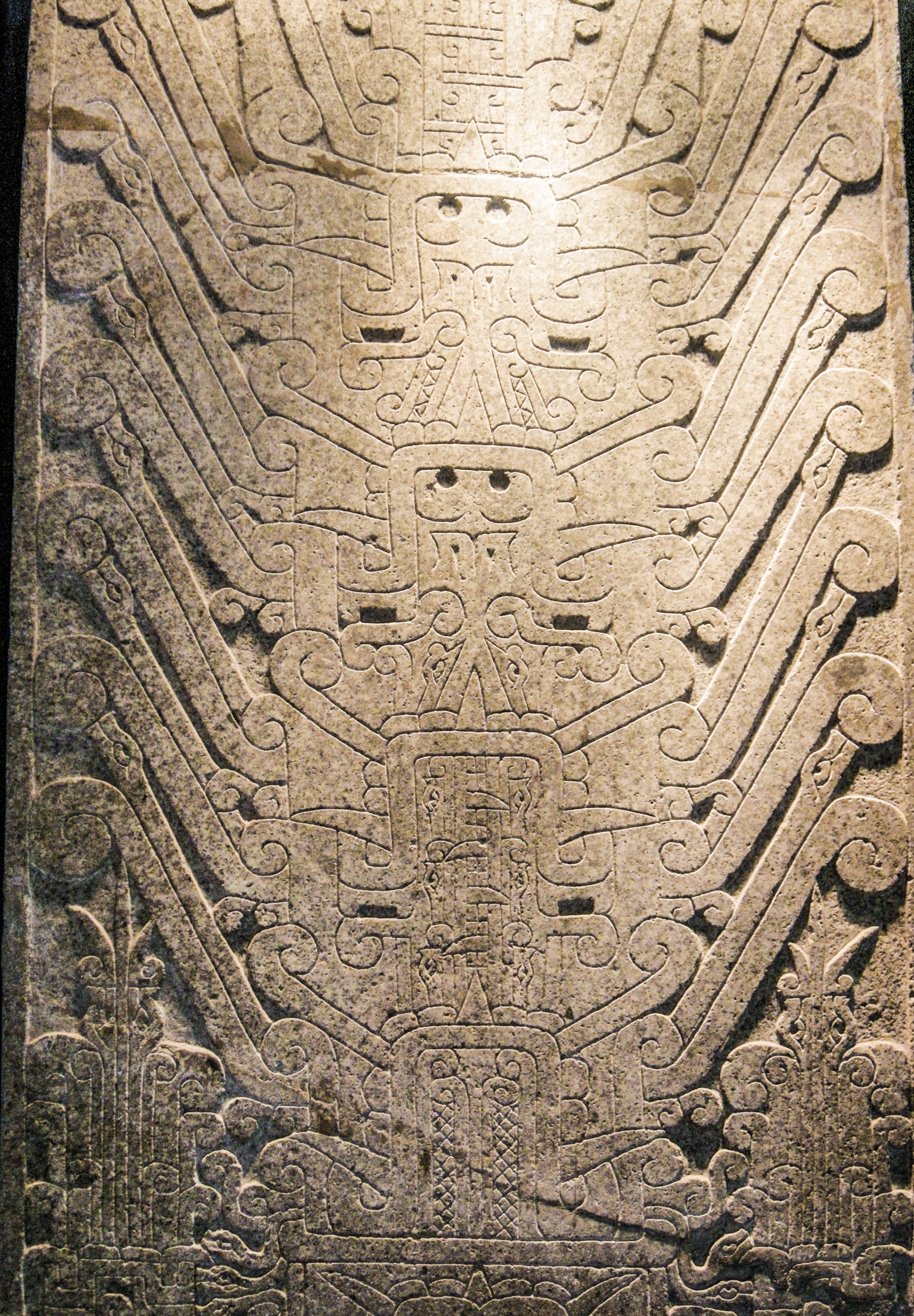
Raimondi Stele

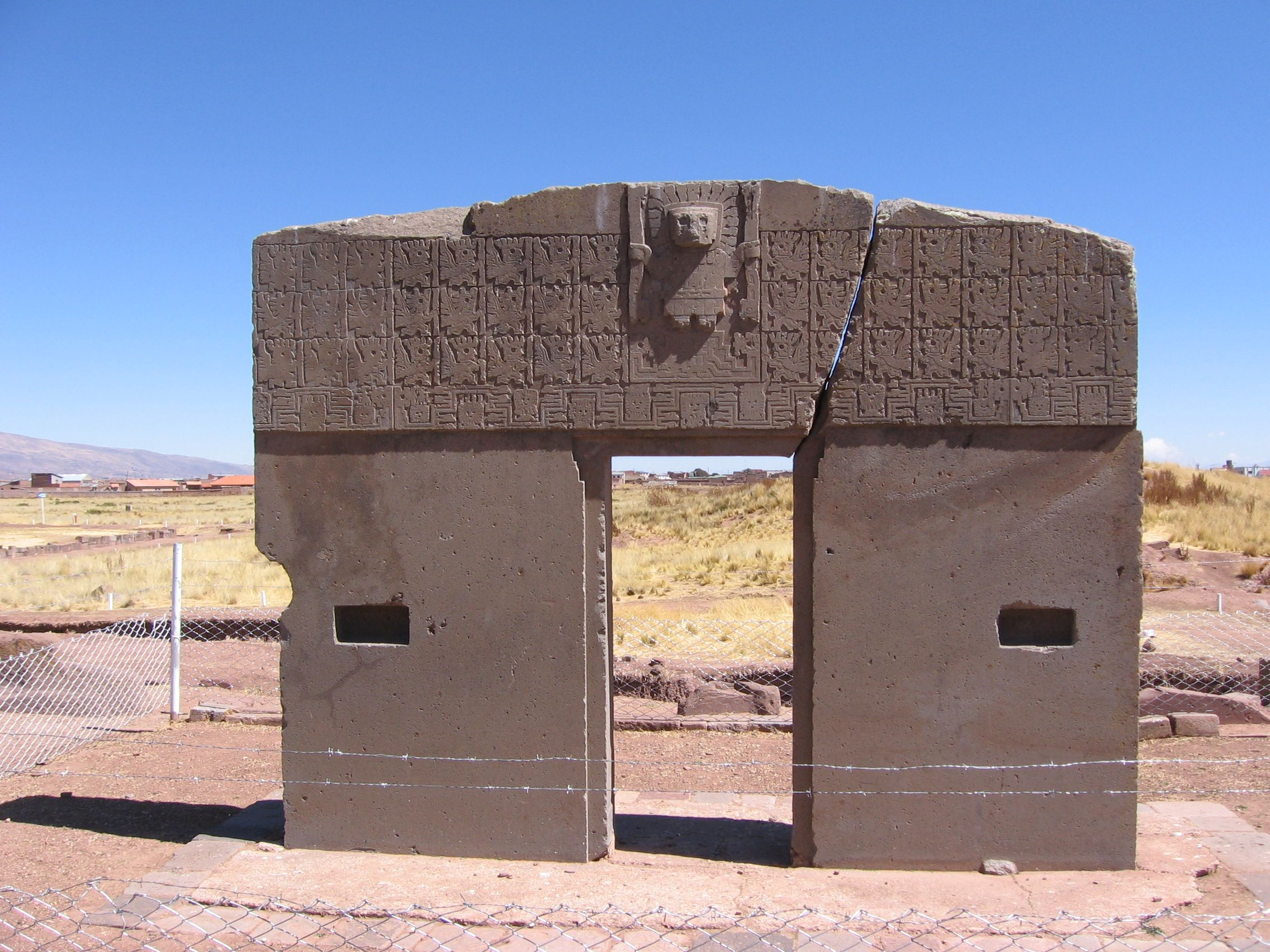
Gate of the Sun

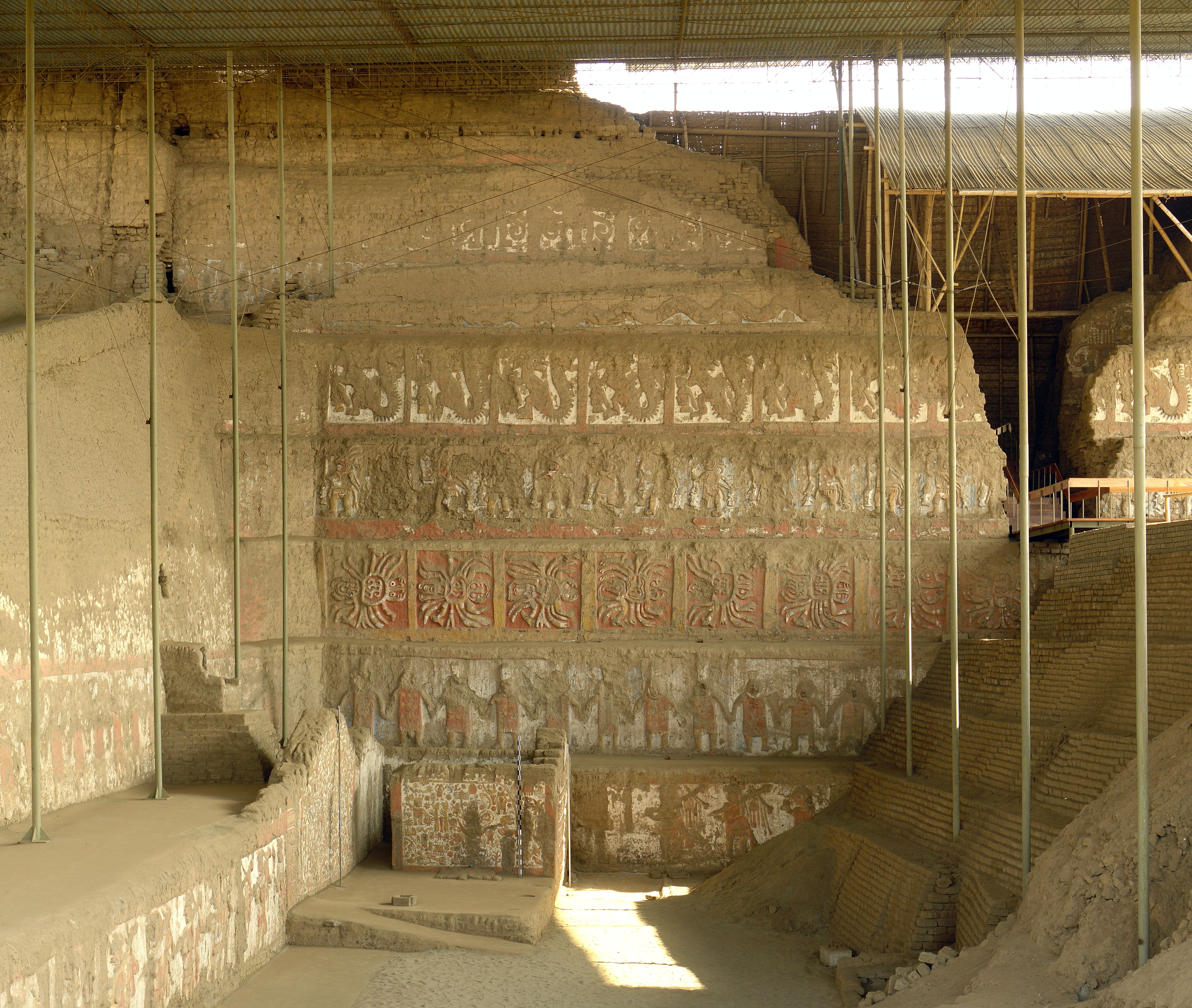
Mural in Huaca de la Luna

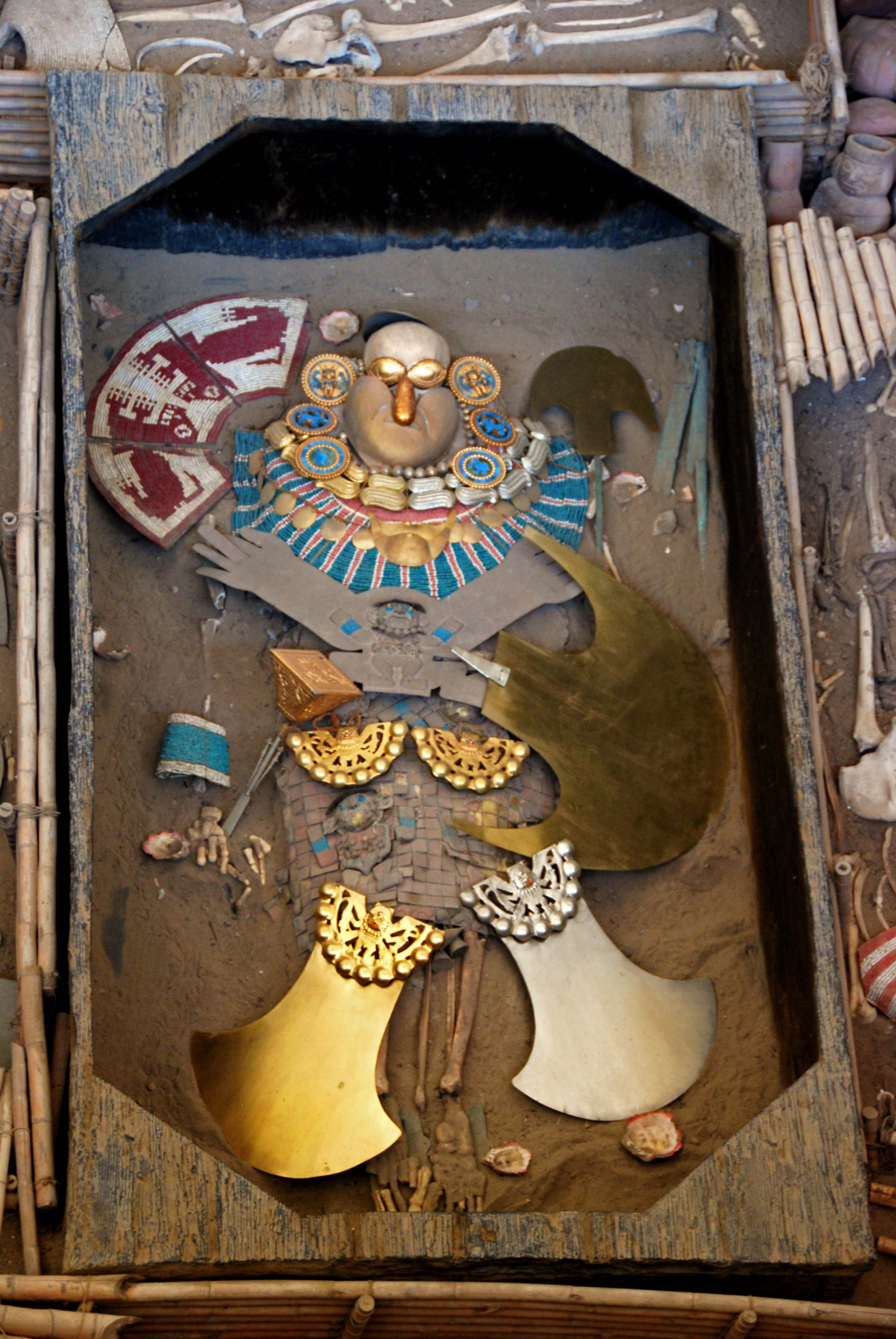
Tomb of the Lord of Sipán (moche mummy)

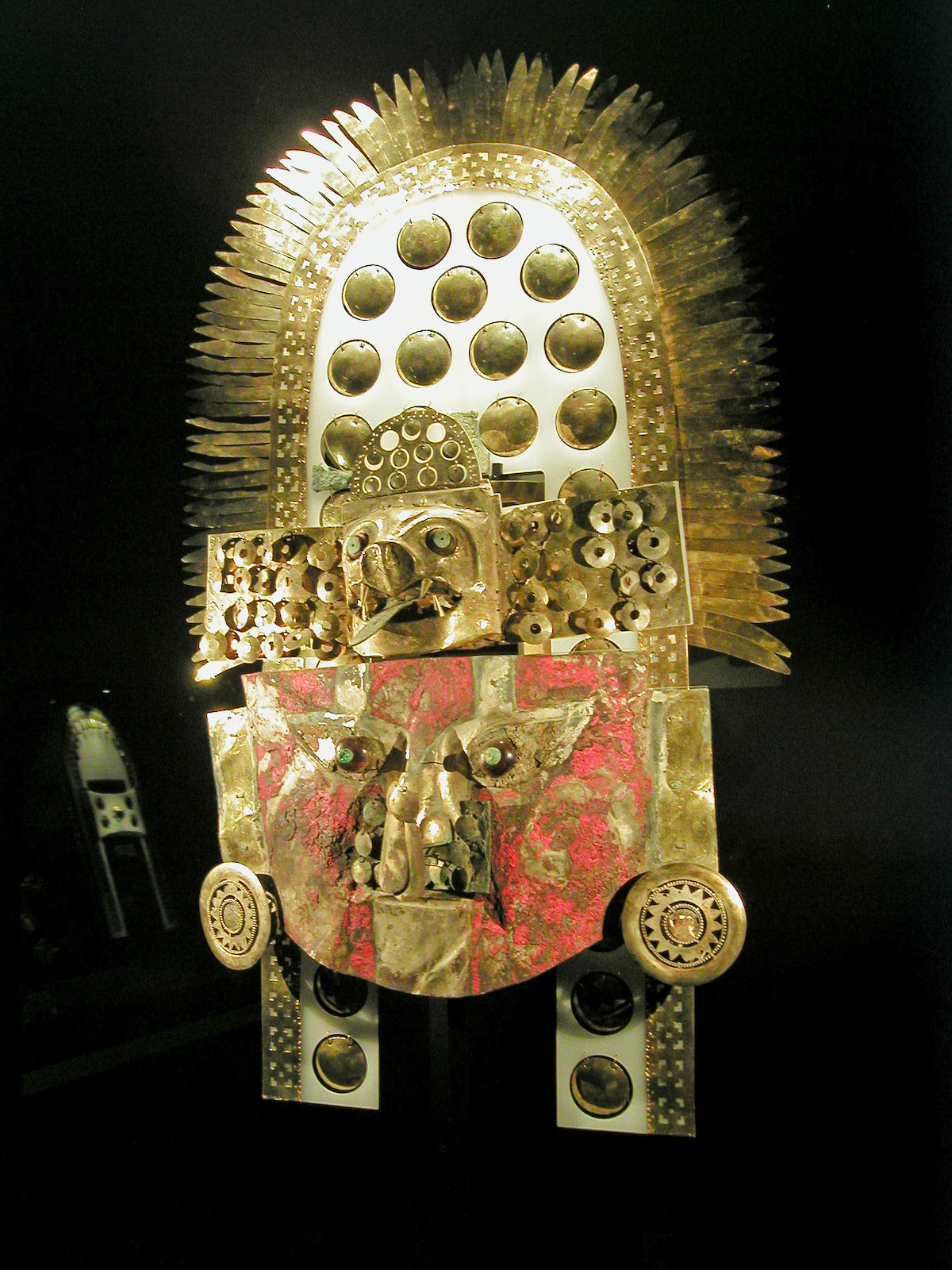
Lambayeque funerary mask in Ferreñafe

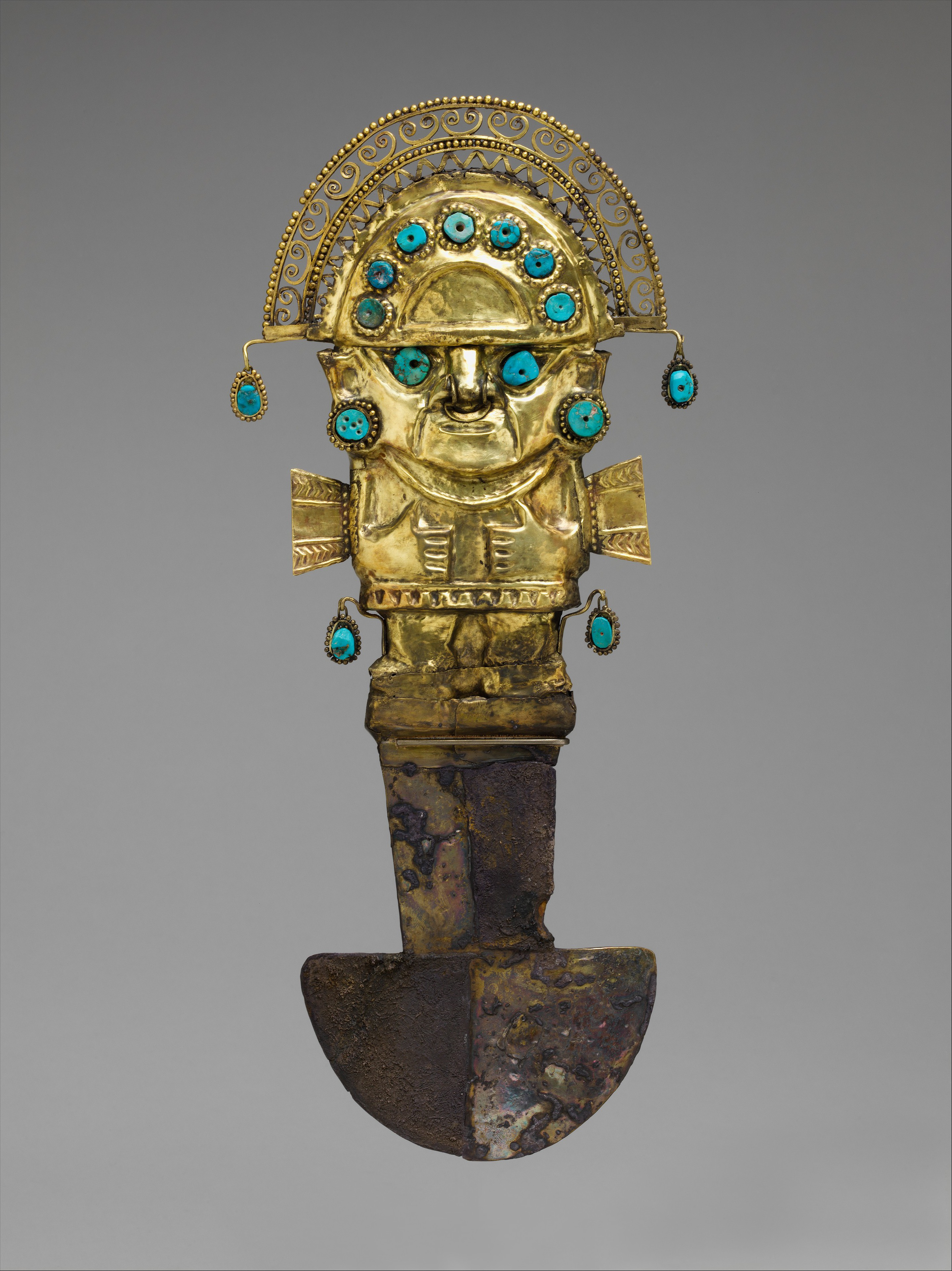
Lambayeque Tumi (ceremonial knife)

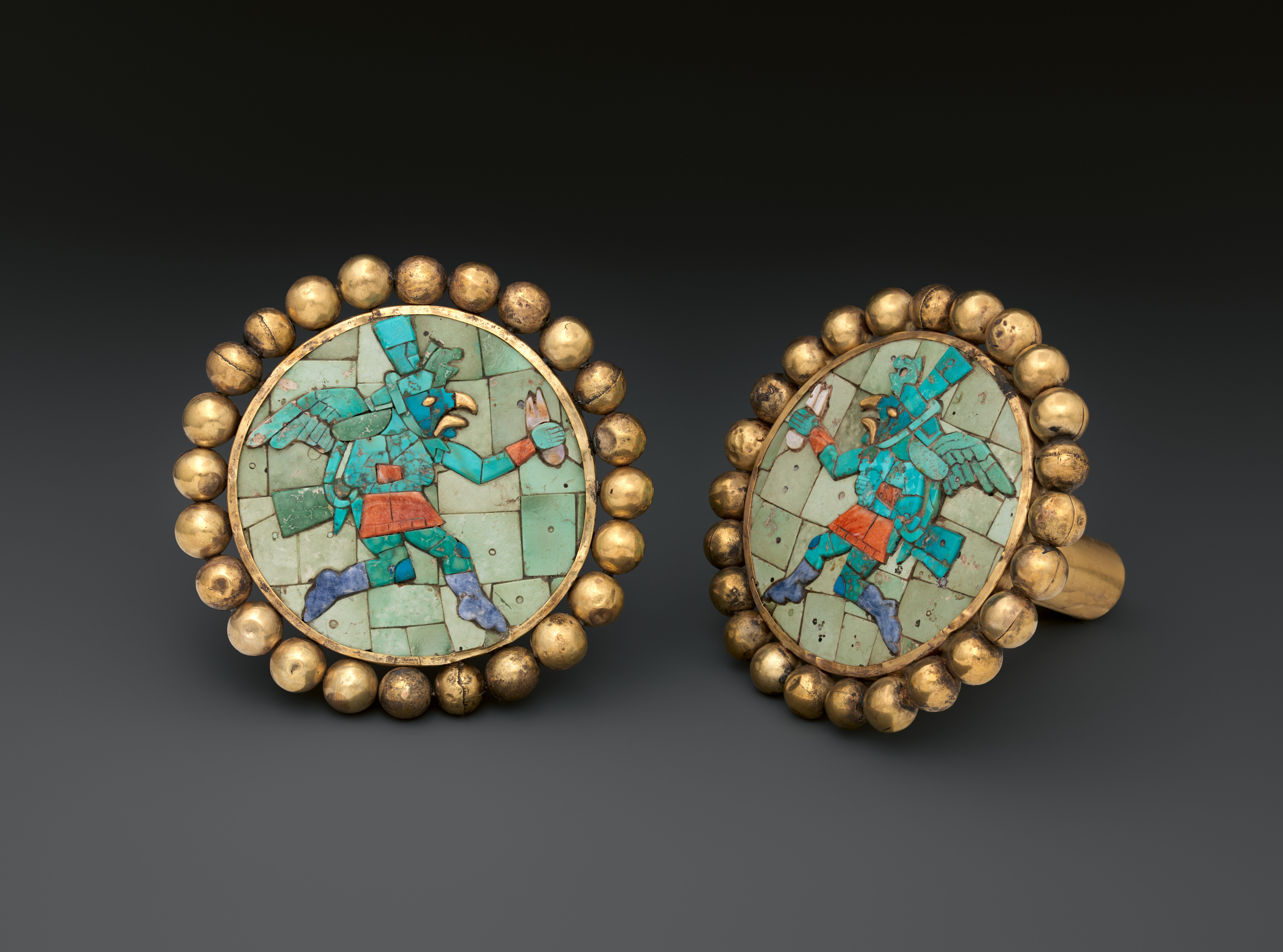
Ear ornament

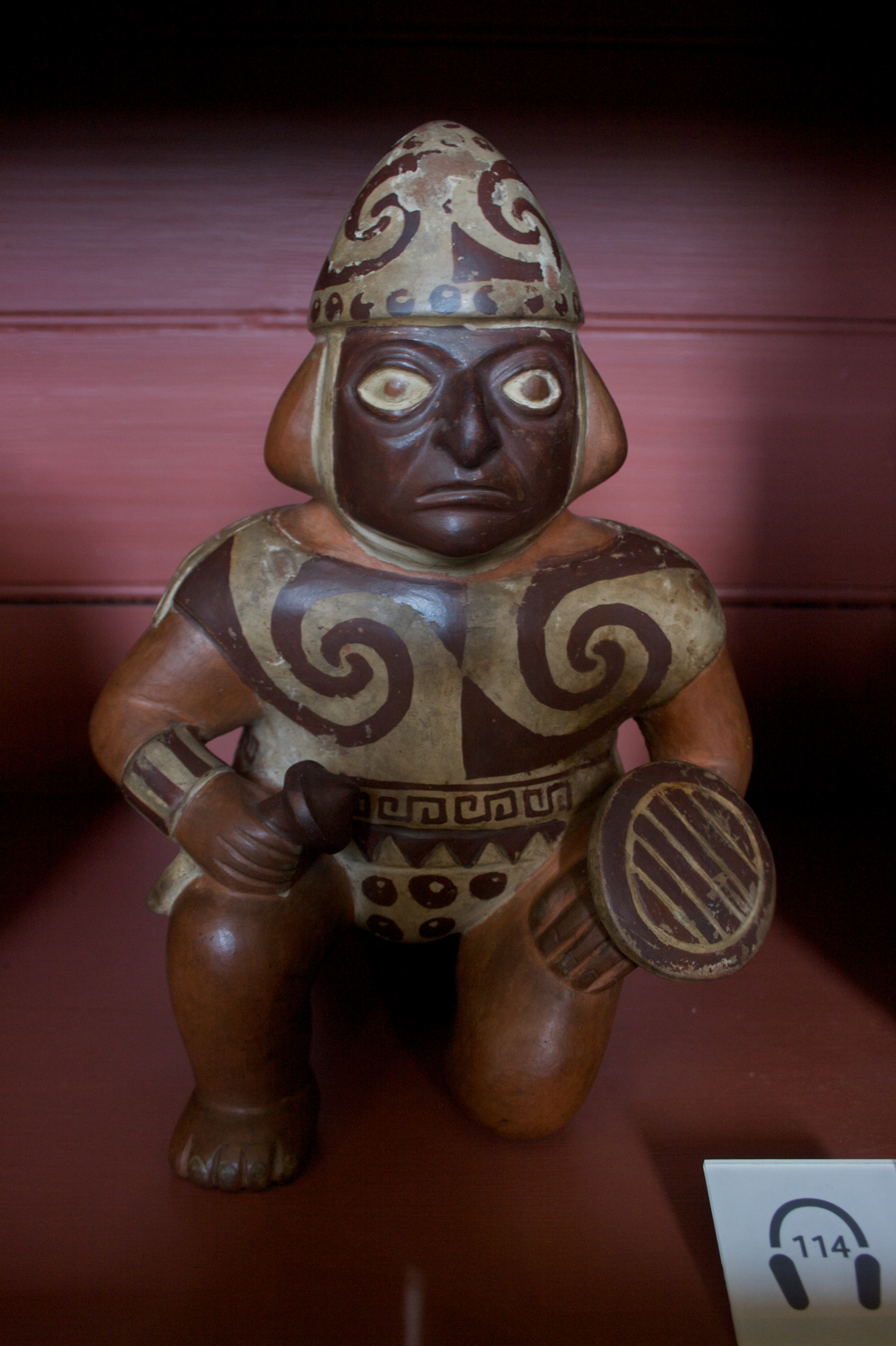
Jug of warrior moche

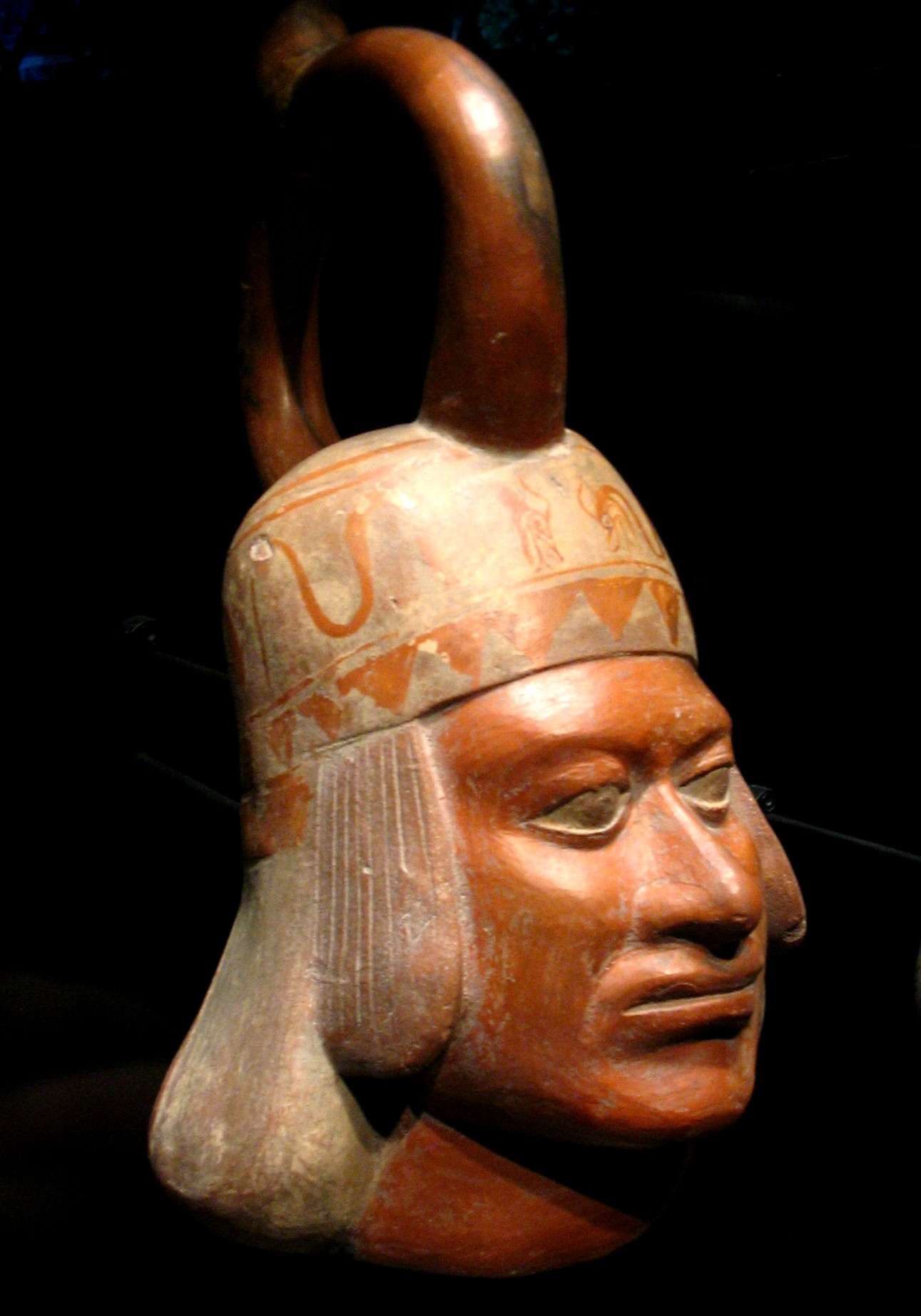
Moche portrait ceramic

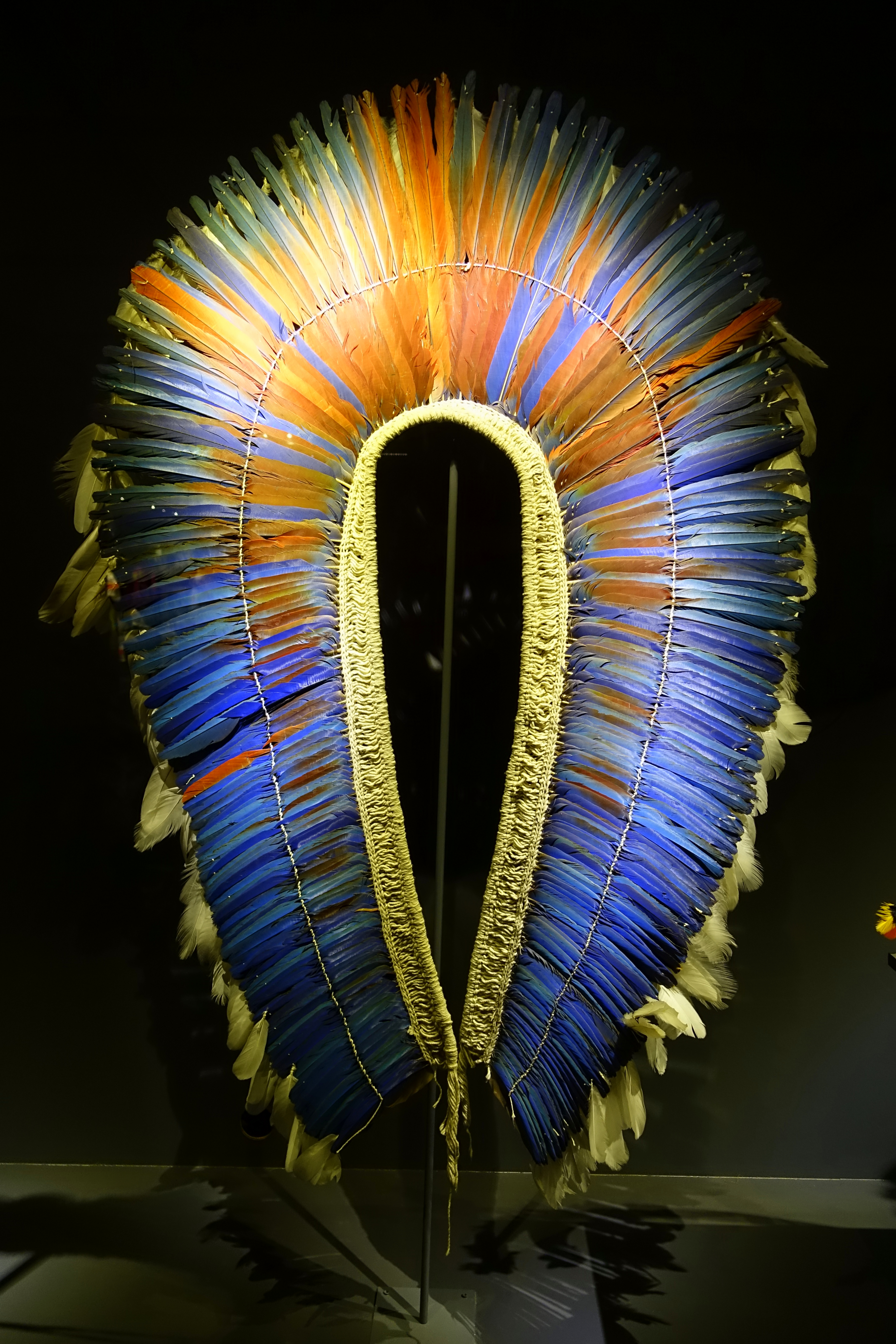
Feather headdress of the Amazonic cultures

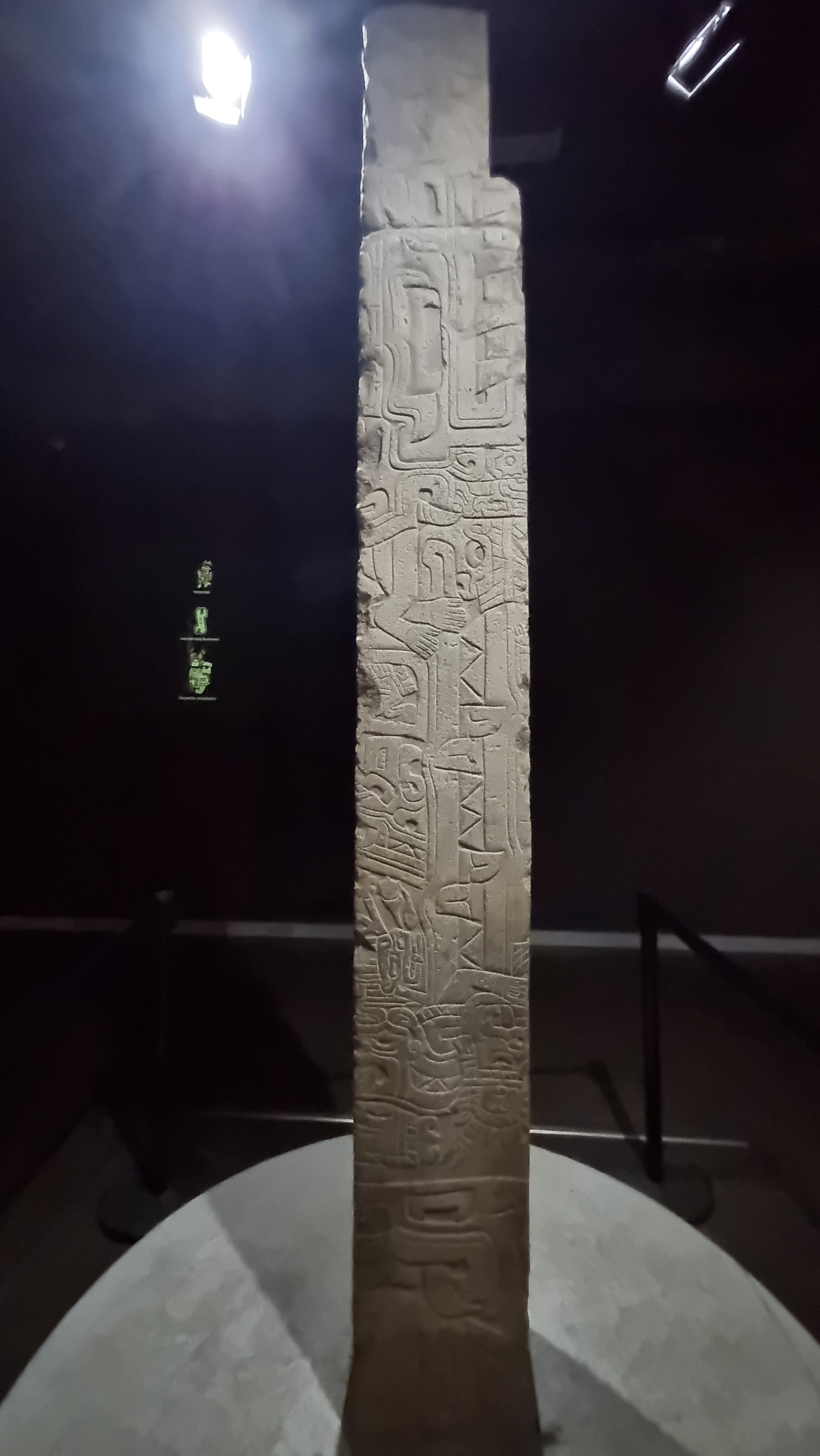
Tello Obelisk from Chavín de Huántar

== See also ==
- Ancient Maya art
- Latin American art
- List of Stone Age art
- Muisca art
- Painting in the Americas before European colonization
- Visual arts by indigenous peoples of the Americas
