= Pacopampa =

Archaeological site in Cajamarca, Peru

- Paqu Pampa
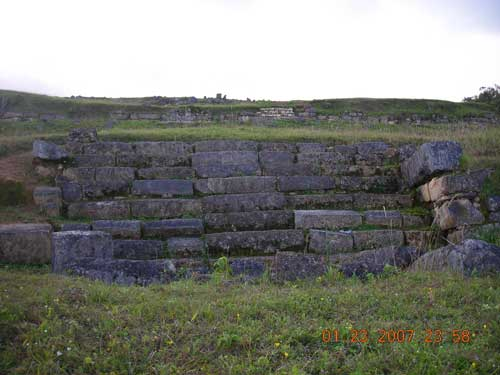
- Remains of the archaeological site of Pacopampa

- Location within Peru
- 6°20′02″S 79°0′47″W
- Periods: Formative Period
- Cultures: Chavín
- Location: Querocoto District, Chota Province, Cajamarca Region, Peru

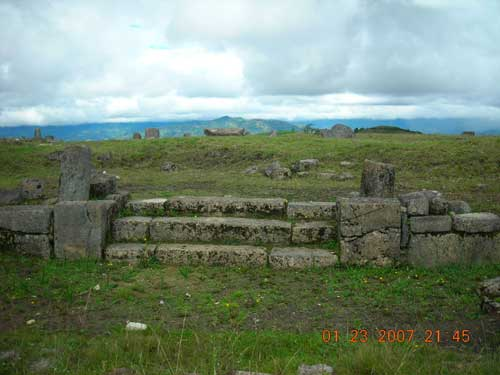
Stairs at the site

Pacopampa (Quechua: paqu pampa) is an archaeological site located in the northern highlands of Peru, in the department of Cajamarca. It presents the remains of a monumental ceremonial center, made with cut and polished stone. It belongs to the Formative period, dating from 1200 to 500 BC. The land where the reservoir extends belongs to the National University of San Marcos, which through its Rural Andean History Seminar cares permanently for the monument.

== Geographical location ==
It is within the village of Pacopampa at 2140 m in the Querocoto District of the province of Chota, Cajamarca Region. It is among the largest ceremonial centers of the northern highlands of Peru. At its surroundings a dozen of archaeological sites have been identified, which a couple have been studied. These are called Chapel and El Mirador, located one kilometer east. Further, 3 km southeast, is Pandanche another Formative period ceremonial center.

== Research ==
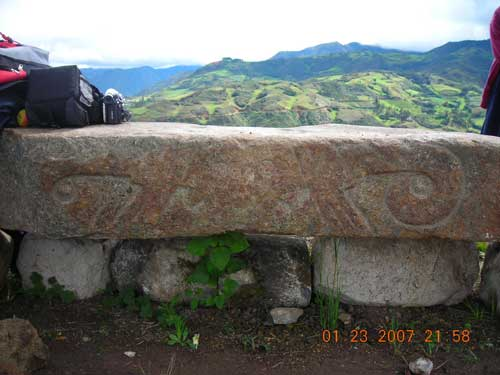
Frieze at Pacopampa

In the 1930s Rafael Larco Hoyle visited the area where samples were collected from the lithosculpture that then he brought it to his museum in Chiclín (Trujillo) and today it is found in the Larco Museum in Lima. He was the first to report, though brief manner on such findings on the site. Pacopampa was related to the Chavin culture when Tello made his theory about the origin of the Peruvian.

In 1966, Pablo Macera traveled to the archaeological site and investigated. Anxious to protect it, in 1970 succeeded Dr. Emilio Choy made a donation to the University of San Marcos so that it could acquire the land so that the excavations would start. Since then and through the Rural Andean History Seminar, the university has consistently cared for the monument.

Hermilio Roses and Ruth Shady explored the architectural structure and conducted excavations (1970). By analyzing pottery they differed a stage prior to the Chavin influence Pacopampa-called Pacopampa (1200 BC), different from the one that follows, entitled Pacopampa-Chavin (700 BC).

== The Lady of Pacopampa ==
In 2009 a team of archaeologists of the Pacopampa Archaeological Project, directed by Yuji Seki, announced the discovery of the tomb of a woman, presumably a person of great power in the area, from around 900 BC or so. The tomb, shaped like a boot, is very deep and had been in all that time free from looters or grave robbers.

The woman, now named "The Lady of Pacopampa" measured 155 cm and when she died she must've been between 30 and 40 years of age. She had an artificially deformed skull and she was buried with rich grave goods composed by earmuffs, gold earrings, ceramic pots and seashell necklaces. It was also found that her skull was dipped in cinnabar. There are indications that she was buried before the construction of the ceremonial temple.
