= Tello Obelisk =

Artefact from Peru

The Tello Obelisk
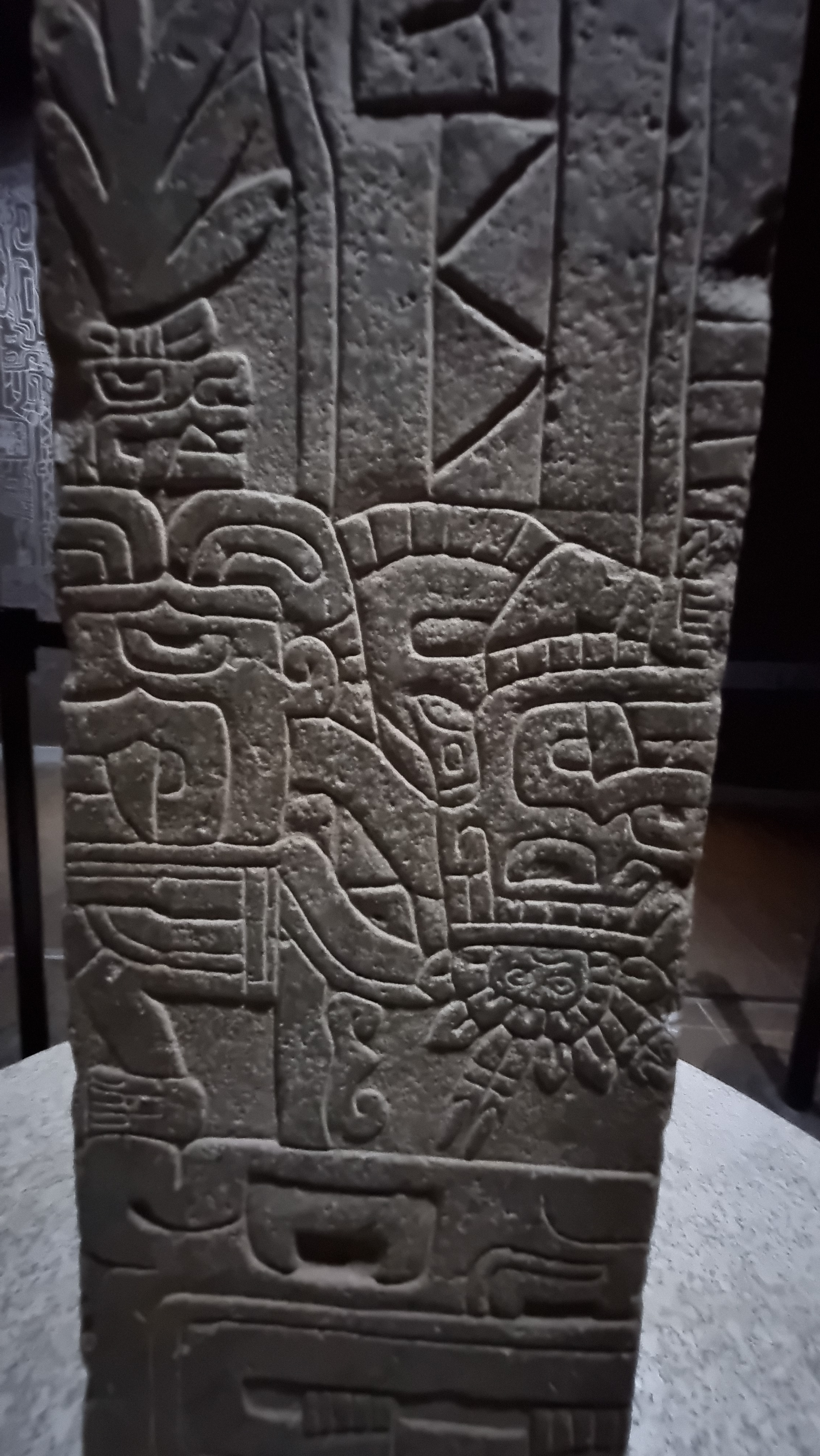
- Chavín culture-era Peruvian Artefact
- Material: Granite
- Height: 2.52 meters
- Discovered: 1919; Chavín de Huántar
- Discovered by: Julio C. Tello
- Present location: Chavín National Museum
- Culture: Chavín culture

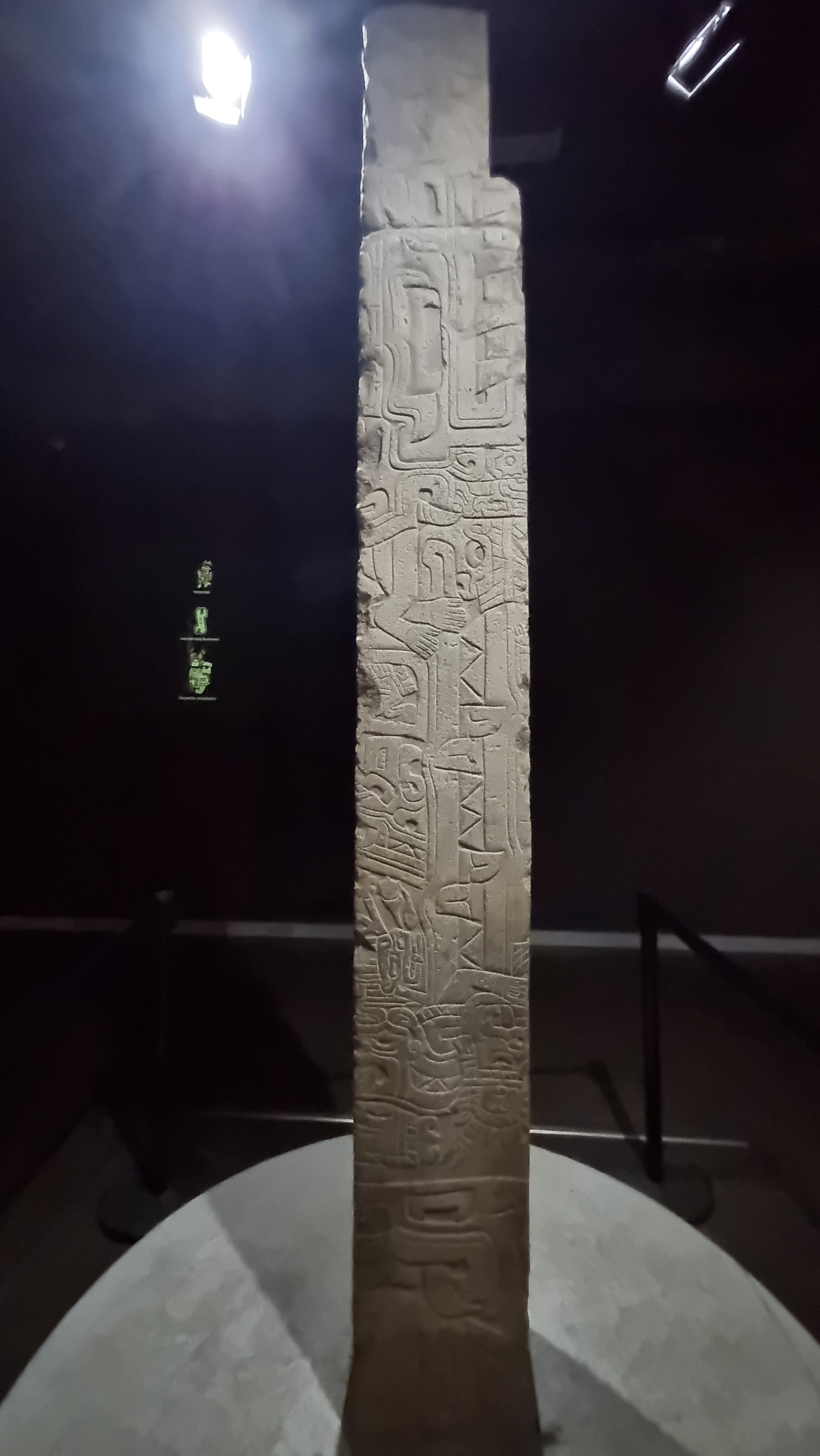
The Tello Obelisk within the Chavín National Museum in 2024

The Tello Obelisk is an Early Horizon-era Granite Obelisk from the Chavín culture found at the site of Chavín de Huántar in Peru. Discovered by Trinidad Alfaro in 1908, and investigated by its namesake, Julio C. Tello, during his excavations of the site, the obelisk is both extensively carved and displaced from its original Archaeological context (unlike the nearby Lanzón stela), making interpretation difficult. Regardless, it is considered an item of immense value to Andean archaeologists due to its complicated carvings of possible great religious importance.

== Description ==
The Tello Obelisk stands at approximately 2.52 m (8.67 ft) tall. Due to stylistic similarities to the Lanzón, it is thought to have likely been found near to Chavín de Huántar's old temple. One likely location of it was in the U-shaped courtyard in front of the temple, as its potential religious and/or cosmological importance would have been greatly reinforced by the view of mountainsides and low-standing reliefs that would have surrounded it.

Carved onto it twice over on both sides (though with slight variations) is a Caiman, with numerous parts of it replaced with faces or other creatures. These likely are not meant to be taken literally, but rather as a "visual kenning," an aspect of Chavín artwork wherein aspects of the body are replaced with creatures that vaguely resemble them, such as snakes for hair or elongated mouths for major lines of the body. The meaning of such kennings are largely lost, as they relied on cultural concepts and traditions that have not survived and must be pieced together by researchers.

The stone engravings are rather shallow, being in some areas only 3 cm (1.18 in) deep, likely due to the hardness of the granite they were carved into.

Its earliest description comes from Julio Tello, who described it as "A long-bodied dragon, with a snout armed with big fangs and feet with claws, that resembles a crocodile. This monster is hermaphrodite, and carries an enormous fanged mouth in its belly and a handful of yuca and red peppers in its feet. Associated with it in the same allegory are three animals, a feline, a fish, and a bird, either vulture or owl."

Although the obelisk had been moved to the National Museum of Archaeology, Anthropology and History of Peru for a time, it was moved back to Chavín with the Chavín National Museum's construction in 2008 (thanks to Japanese support from the General Countervalue Peru-Japan Fund), where it has remained since.

== Construction ==
The Tello Obelisk's construction is of immense curiosity to researchers due to two factors: the distant source of granite (18 km from the site) and the lack of contemporary metal tools to work it with.

The obelisk is a single, unbroken piece of granite that stands approximately 2.52 m (8.67 ft) tall, and must have been removed via a process known as wedging - making a series of holes equidistant before applying pressure to split the desired stone from its surroundings. This method has been presumed due to how similar methods were conducted in Ancient Egypt, indicating that it is a rather uncomplicated technology to develop that could arise in the Andean world independently. It has been presumed that the obelisk was carved (both in overall shape and design) at the quarry due to the nearest granite deposit in the area being 18 km (11.18 mi) away.

The carving of the object was likely done via Abrasion (mechanical), the slow, subtractive process of removing materials through intensive rubbing. Granite - the hardest stone found in the area - naturally requires far more effort to be carved with this method, found in the physical features of the monolith's shallowly-cut depictions and rounded edges. Due to materials removed not being able to be re-added, undercuts are non-existent due to the risk of having to restart the process. To carve these lines following the abrasion hypothesis, the stone would first have to be submerged in water before some sort of abrasive agent (typically sand) was laid atop it. While no tools available were hard enough to carve into the monolith, sand's high silica content can slowly wear through the material, making it so one is able to cut through granite in an effective, if time-consuming, manner. Finally, carving stones were pressed perpendicularly to the rock, allowing layers to slowly be removed and the image to be carved.

== Interpretations ==
Interpretations of the obelisk are, by nature of the loss of cultural context, difficult to parse, but possibly portray some sort of cosmological meaning. Many of the kennings come from different parts of the Andean world, be it the Strombus and Spondylus shells from the Pacific Ocean, the cultivated plants, snakes, and canine or feline (likely Jaguar) teeth from the Amazon rainforest, and Harpy eagle related to the sky all showing different segments of the world. The caiman itself is found in the low tropical forest. As such, different aspects of the world all come together in one image, depicting the land, sea, and air together. All of these could give an overall view of the cosmos according to Andeans of the era, and help them explain their world in a simple image.

The entire image could also be interpreted as a Tree of life, a common motif in the area, with the caiman forming the trunk of the tree with the kennings representing different aspects of the tree. The obelisk itself has been interpreted as vaguely in the shape of a plant shoot, possibly lending credence to such an interpretation of it.

The granite itself likely had symbolic meaning as well. Granite, being the hardest stone in the area, could have given the obelisk a sense of endurance and immutability. If placed within the courtyard, it could have also been used as a Gnomon to tell time or even seasons, giving the enduring stone covered with depictions of life additional meaning and symbolism.

The necessarily shallow engraving could even bear importance, as the low carvings would necessitate (especially in the bright sun) one to come nearer to decipher the image on the obelisk, only to find when they're within what would be striking distance a caiman - similar to how an actual caiman could hide in the water for curious or unsuspecting creatures to near.

Regardless, interpretations of the obelisk are severely limited by a lack of religious and cultural understanding of the Chavín culture.
