= Lanzón =

Sacred monolith in Chavin temple, Peru

Coordinates: 9°35′37.14″S 77°10′41.91″W

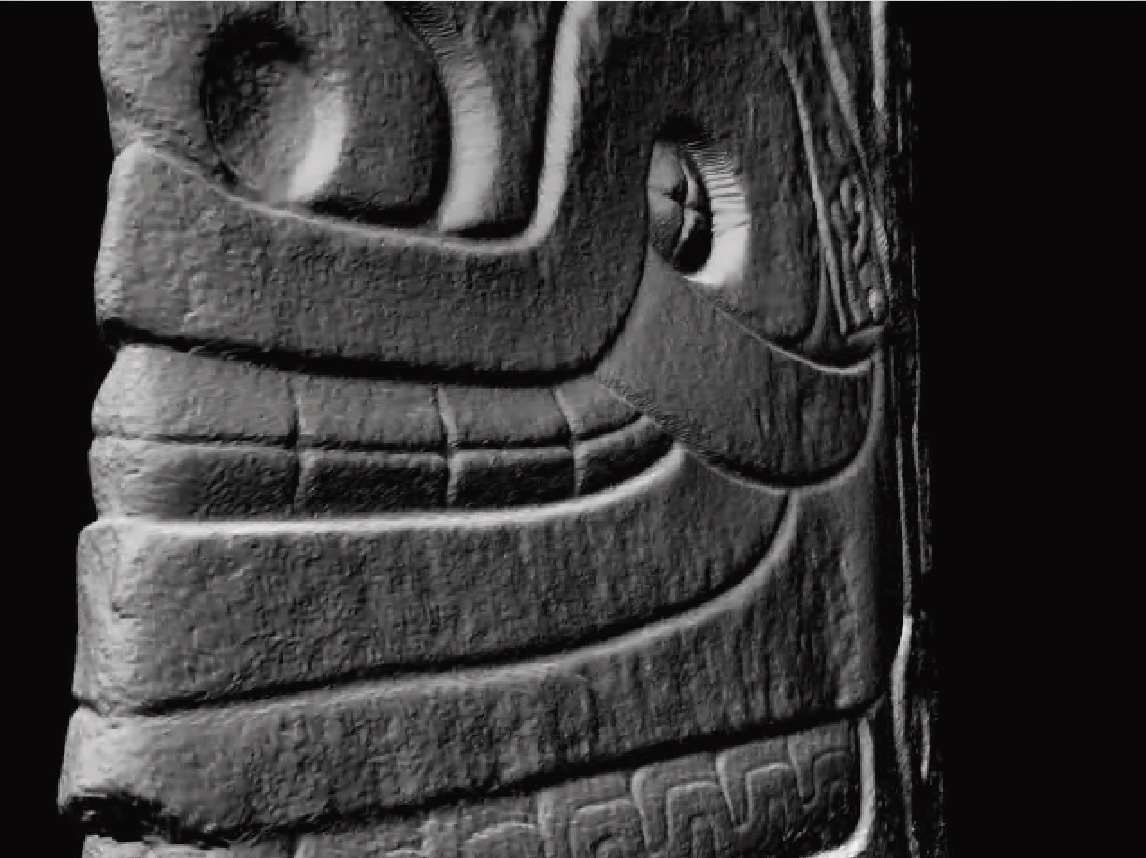
Closeup of the original Lanzon Stela, image taken from laser scan data collected by nonprofit CyArk

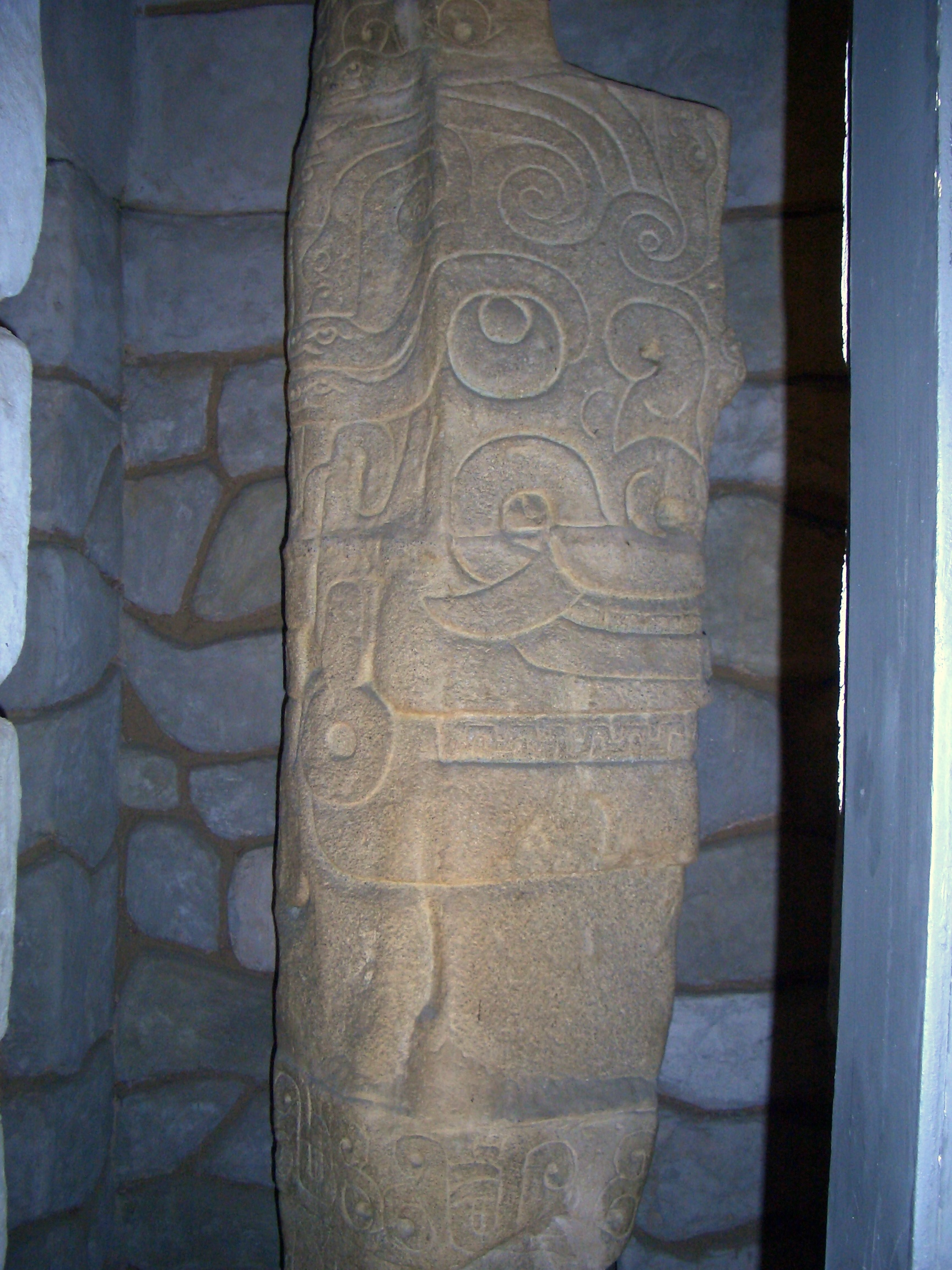
A replica of the Lanzón in Peru's Museum of the Nation

The Lanzón is a granite stela that is associated with the Chavín culture. It is located in the Old Temple of Chavin de Huantar which rests in the central highlands of Peru. The Chavín religion was the first major religious and cultural movement in the Andes mountains, flourishing between 900 and 200 BCE. The Lanzón itself was erected during the Early Horizon period of Andean art circa 500 BCE and takes its name from the Spanish word for "lance," an allusion to the shape of the sculpture. The name is deceiving, as its form more closely resembles a highland plow which would have been used for agricultural purposes at the time. It is suspected because of this that the deity depicted is linked to agrarian worship.

== Geographic location and significance ==
The Lanzón rests in the heart of Chavín de Huantar. This site at the time was on one of the few passes between the mountainous region of the coast and the dense Amazon. Due to the difficulty of the geography, one must have used these passages. The exposure of Chavín art, such as the Lanzon, to other cultures occurred because of its geographic location. Archaeologists have found textiles which echo the architecture of Chavín and its sculptural artifacts buried as far away as the South Coast in sites such as Karwa, suggesting its influence reached much farther than many other sites at the time.

== Visual Analysis ==
The Lanzón is housed in the central cruciform chamber of a labyrinthine series of underground passages in the Old Temple of the ceremonial and religious center of Chavín de Huantar. Devotees would be led into the maze of pitch-black tunnels, eventually coming face to face with the sculpture. The worshipers' disorientation, in addition to the hallucinogenic effects of the San Pedro cactus they were given before entering, only heightened the visual and psychological impact of the sculpture. The imagery of the Lanzon is a complex series of line work which winds around each of the three sides of its floor to ceiling triangular form. Due to the imagery being divided, one would have to circumambulate the fixture in order to fully observe its design. The Lanzon depicts an anthropomorphic figure with a snarl, claws, and teeth akin to a jaguar or bear. The being's hair flows in all directions, ending with the heads of snakes. The eyes are stylized, commonly referred to as pendant eyes. The carving is almost perfectly symmetrical except for one hand being raised with the other lowered. Additionally, there is special attention paid to the eyes, nose, lips, and teeth- deeper set carvings for these features make them project, due to the higher relief, it adds a greater feeling of ferocity.

== Cosmology ==
The Lanzón expresses a fundamental motif within Chavín art: the jaguar. These representations vary from realism to stylized anthropomorphism, this particular stela falling under the latter category. The imagery of the jaguar occurs so frequently within Chavín art that it has been hypothesized that they were the foundation for the jaguar cult, worshipping the characteristics of these animals. This depiction of an anthropomorphic jaguar deity lends itself to other cosmological beliefs not just of Chavín but of Andean society as a whole. Camay, the belief of an object being a conduit for a deity, is particularly significant when considering the function of the Lanzón. Though it was made of terrestrial material, the Lanzón housed a celestial being, the people of Chavín even brought it offerings of food and ceramics.

Furthermore, the central image of the Lanzon functions as axis mundi, or pivot linking the heavens, earth and underworld. This concept is also reflected in the raised and lowered arms, one linked to the celestial and the other linked to the terrestrial. The opposite arms are also reflective of the reverence to duality. Opposites seen in daily life such as night/day, life/death, male/female were considered sacred to create balance. The importance of duality is also seen with the contour rivalry of the snakes and hair, the transformation between man and beast, and the geographical location between the arid mountain range and the lush amazon. Finally, a key cosmological belief within Andean society as a whole, tinku. This is the concept of multiple parts converging to create something wholly new. The strategic geographic location of the Lanzón is placed at the convergence of the Mosna and Wacheqsa rivers.
