= Contour rivalry =

Artistic technique used to create multiple possible visual interpretations of an image

A drawing of the Raimondi Stele	The drawing turned upside down

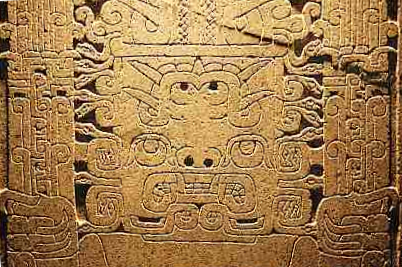
A detail of the Raimondi Stele, an example of contour rivalry produced by the Chavin culture.

Contour rivalry is an artistic technique used to create multiple possible visual interpretations of an image. An image may be viewed as depicting one thing when viewed in a certain way; but if the image is flipped or turned, the same lines that formed the previous image now make up an entirely new design.

This technique was widely practiced by the artists of the Chavín culture of the central Andes about two thousand years ago. An example of this technique from the Chavín is the Raimondi Stele.

== See also ==
- List of art media
- List of artistic media
- List of art movements
- List of art techniques
- List of most expensive paintings
- List of most expensive sculptures
- List of sculptors
- Optical illusion
- Rotational symmetry
- Three hares
- Triquetra
- Triskelion
