= Querocoto District =

Coordinates: 6°21′31″S 79°02′08″W

Querocoto Qiruqutu
- District
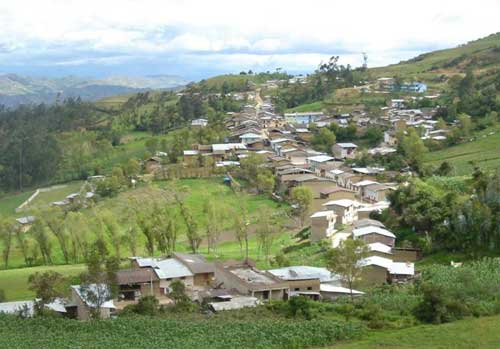
- Village of Querocoto
- Interactive map of Querocoto
- Country: Peru
- Region: Cajamarca
- Province: Chota
- Founded: May 14, 1876
- Capital: Querocoto

Government
  - Mayor: José Anibal Perez Valderrama

Area
  - Total: 301.07 km^{2} (116.24 sq mi)
- Elevation: 2,455 m (8,054 ft)

Population (2005 census)
  - Total: 9,804
  - Density: 32.56/km^{2} (84.34/sq mi)
- Time zone: UTC-5 (PET)
- UBIGEO: 060415

Querocoto District is one of nineteen districts of the province Chota in Peru.
