= Contumazá (disambiguation) =

Contumazá may refer to:

- Contumazá, a city in northern Peru.
- Contumazá District, a district in the Contumazá Province.
- Contumazá Province, a province in northern Peru.
