= San Benito =

San Benito may refer to:

== Places ==
=== Mexico and Central America ===
- San Benito, Petén, Guatemala
- San Benito, a community in Tipitapa, Nicaragua
- Islas San Benito, an island off the west coast of Baja California, Mexico

=== Philippines ===
- San Benito, Surigao del Norte, a municipality
- San Benito, a barangay in Dagami, Leyte

=== South America ===
- San Benito, Cochabamba, Bolivia
- San Benito, Santander, Colombia
- San Benito District, a district in Contumazá province, Peru
  - San Benito, Peru, capital of the district

=== United States ===
- San Benito, California
- San Benito County, California
- San Benito AVA, a wine region in San Benito County, California
- San Benito, Texas

== Other uses ==
- San Benito de Palermo, a saint in the Catholic church
- San Benito el Real, Valladolid, a church and former Benedictine monastery in Spain
- Sanbenito, a penitential garment during the time of the Spanish Inquisition
- San Benito (ship), a 16th century Spanish carabela

== See also ==
- Benedict (disambiguation), for saints called San Benito in some languages
