= Peru–Yale University dispute =

Custody dispute over cultural artifacts

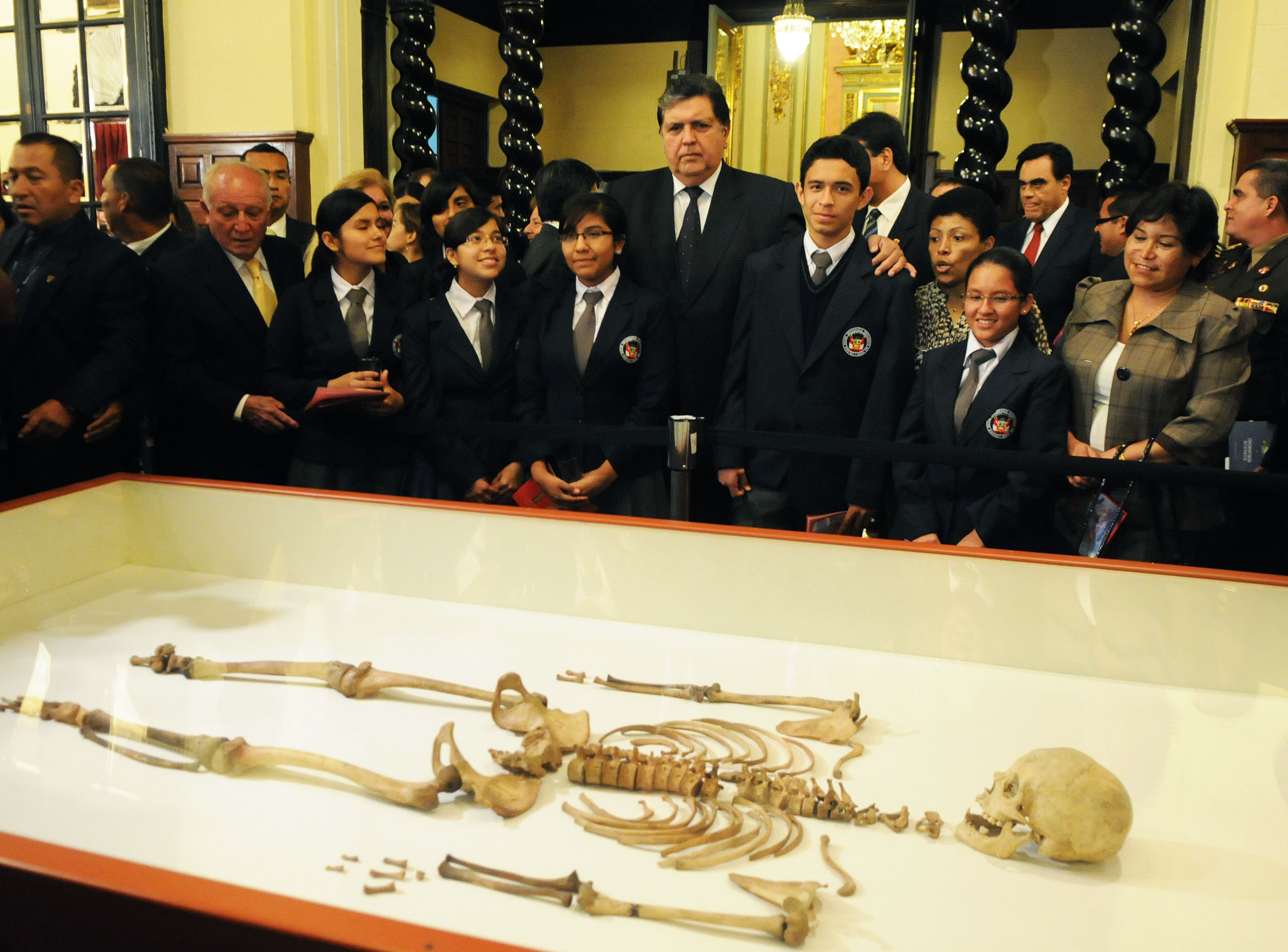
Inca human remains were among the first artifacts in Yale's collection to be repatriated to Peru, arriving in the first of three shipments between March 2011 and November 2012.

The Peru–Yale University dispute was a century-long conflict between the government of Peru and Yale University about the rightful ownership of Inca human remains and artifacts from Machu Picchu, an ancient Inca site high in the Peruvian Andes active c. 1420–1532. In the several years following his re-discovery of Machu Picchu in 1911, Yale explorer Hiram Bingham III removed thousands of objects – including pottery, stone tools, and human bones – from the archaeological site and brought them to New Haven, Connecticut. The circumstances of these transfers were disputed, with some, including Bingham, claiming that Yale agreed to borrow the artifacts for a period of 18 months to conduct studies. Peru attempted to regain the collection in the 1920s, but Yale resisted. Tensions rose between 2006 and 2010 with a lawsuit, activism by Peruvians and Yale alumni, and a plea to then–U.S. President Barack Obama by then–Peruvian President Alan Garcia. On November 19, 2010, Peru and Yale reached an agreement that the remains and artifacts would be returned. In early 2011, Yale and University of Cusco (UNSAAC) signed a further agreement that the two institutions would partner to create a museum and research center in Cusco. The museum, the Museo Machu Picchu, was opened to the public in November 2011. The collection is regarded by experts to be among the most valuable collections of Inca artifacts.

== Background ==
Machu Picchu is an Inca site high in the Andes mountains. Archeologists believe that at 8,000 ft (2,400 m) elevation, Machu Picchu was a summer retreat for the Inca Emperor Pachacutec and his close associates. The walled and terraced site contains palaces, baths, temples, and 150 houses carved from granite blocks assembled with extraordinary precision. The Incas planted potatoes and maize and used advanced farming techniques such as terracing and irrigation. Machu Picchu was occupied c. 1420–1532, but by 1527, a smallpox epidemic halved the population, and the site was abandoned by the time conquistador Francisco Pizzaro arrived in 1532. Machu Picchu, which was declared a UNESCO World Heritage Site in 1983, is at the heart of the Inca Empire, and is central to Peru’s history and cultural identity. Hundreds of thousands of tourists visit Machu Picchu each year.

== Chronology ==
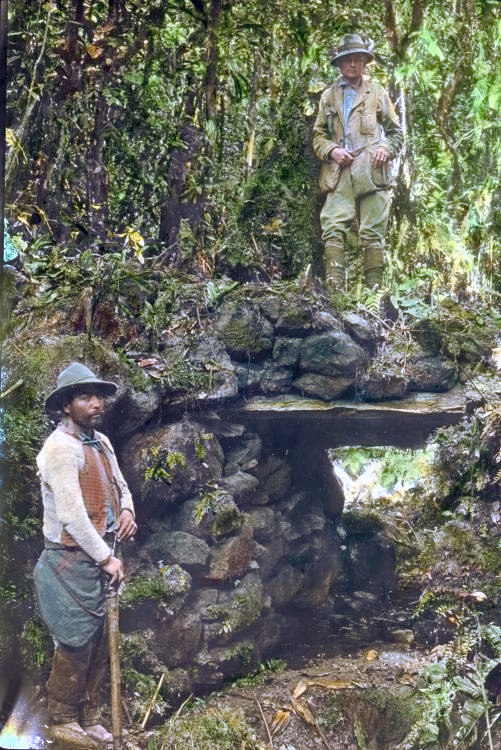
Bingham (upper right) with a local guide at Espiritu Pampa in Peru. Hand-colored glass slide, 1911

=== Re-discovery of Machu Picchu (1911) ===
Hiram Bingham first learned about Machu Picchu while he was a lecturer in South American history at Yale University. On his return from a 1908 trip to Chile, he traveled through Peru, where he heard stories of a “lost” Inca city. Intrigued, Bingham returned to Peru in 1911 and, with the help of local guides who already knew of the city, he arrived at Machu Picchu on July 24. He wrote that the city “fairly took my breath away”. Later that year Bingham wrote an article for National Geographic magazine, which helped to popularize the ruins internationally. The New York Times called it “the greatest archaeological discovery of the age.” Bingham’s 1911 photos of Machu Picchu caused a “worldwide sensation”.

Further trips in 1912 and 1914 were funded by Yale, the National Geographic Society, and Bingham's wife's family, the founders of Tiffany & Co. During these trips, thousands of artifacts including ceramics, jewelry and human bones, were packed in crates and sent to New Haven. Yale had permission from Peru to export artifacts that were uncovered: while Peruvian law banned the export of artifacts, a special agreement under Peruvian President Augusto B. Leguía made an exception to the export ban. But the agreement “clearly stated that the artifacts belonged to Peru”; Bingham could bring the artifacts to the United States, but also “the Peruvian Government reserves the right to exact from Yale University and the National Geographic Society of the United States of America the return of the unique specimens and duplicates”.

=== Difference of opinion ===
Tulane University anthropologist John Verano commented on the origins of the dispute, saying “There's some difference of opinion whether Hiram Bingham had a legitimate permit to export.” A November 1916 letter from Bingham to Gilbert H. Grosvenor of the National Geographic Society suggests that Bingham believed the objects to be on loan. He writes: "Now they do not belong to us, but to the Peruvian government, who allowed us to take them out of the country on condition that they be returned in 18 months." Bingham understood the importance of the artifacts to the Peruvian people, writing, "The whole matter has assumed a very large importance in the eyes of the Peruvians, who feel that we are trying to rob their country of its treasures."

Now they do not belong to us, but to the Peruvian government, who allowed us to take them out of the country on condition that they be returned in 18 months.

— Hiram Bingham III, in a letter to the National Geographic Society (November 1916)

Colin Renfrew, professor of archeology at Cambridge University, called the export deal between Bingham and Peru “very murky". To further complicate the dispute, there is some disagreement about the contents of the crates Bingham removed. Peru expert Christopher Heaney points out that at the time, excavators often failed to report a portion of the findings in the official inventories — to have “more control” in the process of dividing up the artifacts among institutions and governments — and that “Yale had made a practice of keeping their better finds quiet”.

Sharon Flescher, executive director of the International Foundation for Art Research, which helps track stolen cultural artifacts, states that this was not a case of looting, but rather a contractual dispute.

Peruvian officials stated that the transfer of artifacts to Yale was a loan, not permanent.

=== Peabody Museum (1912–2011) ===
The objects were held by Yale for nearly 100 years. During this period, they were sometimes on display at the Peabody Museum of Natural History, and sometimes in traveling exhibits. For example, between 2003 and 2006, many of the pieces were on tour as part of the exhibit "Machu Picchu: Unveiling the Mystery of the Incas”. Yale anthropology professor Richard Burger was the primary caretaker of the artifacts for nearly 30 years.

David Ugarte, regional director of Peru's National Culture Institute (INC), claimed that requests to Yale to return the artifacts, beginning in 1917, were repeatedly ignored. He explained, "They always wrote back with different excuses – first they said they needed more time to evaluate the pieces, then, in later years, said they were studying our requests for the return.”

On October 26, 1920, Peru asked Yale to return the objects. Peru attempted to exercise their right to extract the artifacts from Yale, as outlined in the original agreement. Eduardo Higginson, Peruvian General Counsel to the U.S., wrote a letter to the National Geographic Society, stating, “I beg to inform you that I have received this day a cablegram from the Director of Instruction of the Peruvian Government, asking me to request from you the return of the original and duplicate objects taken from Peru.” Learning of the request, Bingham also wrote a letter to the NGS, stating: “I suppose we shall have to raise some more money to ship the material back to Peru. I wish there were some other way out of it.” Yale responded by asking the Peruvian government for an extension until January 1, 1922, which was granted. However, the date passed and no artifacts were returned. Yale claimed that it tried to reach an agreement but the Peruvians rejected their attempts. Nevertheless, Yale did return some of the artifacts in 1922, but Peru called these items "worthless”.

=== Changing sentiment ===
In the 2000s, attitudes were shifting towards repatriation of museum artifacts, including Greek and Roman antiquities, but also those from Mesoamerica and South America. At the time, there was a “recent upsurge of ownership controversies between U.S. museums and foreign governments.” Similar stories were unfolding between other museums and the modern-day nations whose artifacts had been held there. For example, a similar dispute between New York's Metropolitan Museum of Art and the Italian government resulted in the museum returning 21 ancient objects to Italy in exchange for a vase and silver pieces that Italy said were looted. Patty Gerstenblith, a law professor at DePaul University who specializes in cultural property issues called the out-of-court settlement in this case “a quick and easy resolution". Similar stories were playing out at the Museum of Fine Arts in Boston, the Toledo Museum of Art in Ohio, and the Cleveland Museum of Art. Greece has demanded that Britain return marble statues from the Parthenon in Athens. As a result, these developments were already having an effect on museums’ policies for new acquisitions. Museums were instituting stricter acquisition policies, and more thorough research, to ensure the provenance of their pieces.

=== Conflict re-ignited (2001) ===
In 2001 the repatriation dispute was re-ignited. The Yale personnel in charge of the artifacts at the time included Yale professor Richard Burger and Peabody Museum curator Lucy Salazar. The pair approached new Peruvian President Alejandro Toledo about co-creating an exhibit. While Toledo and his wife Eliane Karp, an anthropologist, initially considered the proposal, by August 2002 it was clear that Peru would pursue repatriation. For the next ten years, Peru would demand the return of the entire collection.

Negotiations began in 2003, and by 2005 there were discussions of starting a museum at Machu Picchu to hold the artifacts. Yale deputy arts provost Barbara Shailor offered Peru a deal in which Yale would return a "substantial number" of objects, but keep the majority of them. In 2006, after three years of negotiations, Peru rejected Yale's offer to split the objects. Yale claimed that the objects from Bingham’s third and final expedition to Machu Picchu had already been returned to Peru years before — in accordance with a Peruvian decree requiring the return of the artifacts. That being the case, Peru was focused on the objects from Bingham’s first expedition in 1912, which had been removed from the country under a much looser agreement.

==== Yale’s positions ====
Despite Yale's belief that it has title to all of the Bingham materials, it has been willing to negotiate the return of many objects to Peru.

— Yale deputy arts provost Barbara Shailor, 2006

Yale deputy arts provost Barbara Shailor articulated some of Yale’s positions on the matter after Peru rejected Yale’s offer of a partial return. She argued that under Peruvian law in 1912, Yale became the owner of the collection "at the time of their excavation and ever since.” She also said that in order to avoid a protracted legal battle, Yale was willing to cooperate, saying that "despite Yale's belief that it has title to all of the Bingham materials, it has been willing to negotiate the return of many objects to Peru”. Janet Sweeting, the Peabody's education director, added that over a long period, Yale had served a valuable function by preserving the entirety of a collection that might otherwise have been dispersed, and by making the items available to the public in their displays. Yale also noted that their contributions to preserving and displaying the artifacts had helped make Machu Picchu famous. Furthermore, Yale’s lawyers argued that the artifacts were exported legally, and that Peru did not have legal standing due to the length of time that had passed since the artifacts were moved to Yale.

==== Peru’s positions ====
Peruvian President Alejandro Toledo, the first indigenous person to hold the office, set the repatriation of the Machu Picchu artifacts as a priority. The repatriation would help restore nationalist sentiment, and would also augment the tourist experience at Peru’s biggest attraction.

=== Rising tensions (2006–2010) ===
In March 2006, after the Peruvian government rejected Yale's proposal to divide the artifacts between the two countries, it instead threatened to sue the university. Peruvian Ambassador Eduardo Ferrero said that Bingham took objects from Machu Picchu "with the legal authorization and express understanding of all the parties that the artifacts were on a temporary loan and would be returned to Peru".

Peruvian activists demanded the return of the artifacts. On May 9, 2006, several thousand townspeople from the region surrounding Machu Picchu marched through the streets of Cuzco to demand that Yale return the artifacts. One protester stated that the artifacts were “a form of cultural identity for us”. The activists urged then-President Alejandro Toledo to move forward with the lawsuit against Yale.

In 2008 Yale gave permission to Peru to inspect the collection. Cecilia Bákula, head of the Peruvian National Institute of Culture, inventoried the collection and claimed that 46,332 of Yale’s objects were held illegally. In April of 2009, Peruvian officials filed a civil lawsuit against Yale in the U.S. District Court for the District of Columbia; Yale filed motions to dismiss, and Peru filed counter-motions. Yale called Peru’s lawsuit “stale and meritless”.

“Devuelvenos el patrimonio!” (“Give us back our heritage!”)

— Protesters in Lima and Cusco, November 5, 2010

Stephanie Swanson, writing in the San Diego International Law Journal, called the export of artifacts to Yale “questionable”, and concluded that “Peru never transferred full legal title over the artifacts to Yale" and that "Yale’s legal arguments for retaining possession are based primarily on procedural loopholes”.

Archaeologist Colin Renfrew of the McDonald Institute for Archaeological Research at the University of Cambridge said that governments should focus less on artifacts that are already in museums and instead focus on the ongoing looting of archaeological sites that continues today.

In 2009, Thomas Conroy, a spokesperson for Yale, said the university and Peru had shared objectives, saying “We still have the same goal, to seek an ongoing collaboration which reflects Peru's interest in the material and the rest of the world's interest… And Yale does think such an agreement could serve as a model or an example of how [similar] disputes could be settled."

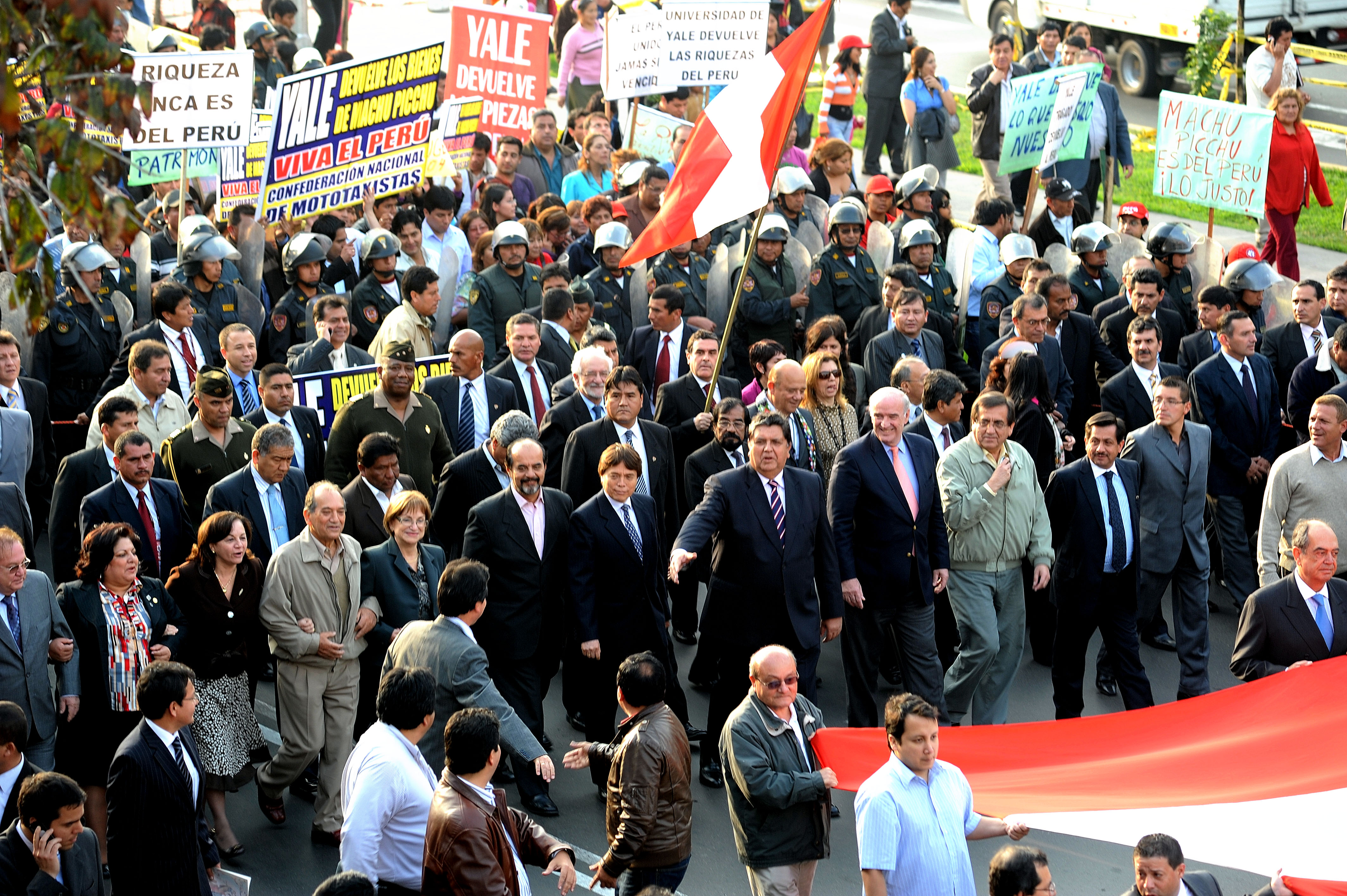
Peruvian President Alan Garcia participating in protests in 2010 demanding that Yale return the collection.

In June of 2010, Peruvian President Alan Garcia reached out to U.S. President Barack Obama for assistance in getting the artifacts returned. That same month, thousands of Peruvian protesters demonstrated in several cities demanding the return of the artifacts.

An October 2010 opinion piece in the Yale Daily News, written on behalf of a group of 23 Yale alumni in Peru, urged university officials to return the artifacts. The alumni clarified that their concern was not whether “Yale’s legal arguments are logically defensible or not”, but rather about “Yale’s rising above such conflict, putting legal distinctions aside, showing a willingness to accommodate the enormous importance of these objects to Peru”. The letter concluded with reference to increasing tensions surrounding the artifacts: “Yale must find a quick and cooperative way to return the artifacts while the political environment is still reasonably calm.” Later, Roger Atwood, author of Stealing History, a book about the looting of Peruvian antiquities, also suggested that Peru focus on "ethical persuasion" rather than legal battles, in order to win back the collection.

On November 5, 2010, President Garcia led a march through the streets of Lima, demanding the return of the artifacts and saying that Yale’s refusal to do so was a “global crime”. Thousands of protesters in Lima and Cusco chanted “Devuelvenos el patrimonio!” (“Give us back our heritage!”) Nine Peruvians running the New York Marathon wore shirts with a clear message: "Yale, Return Machu Picchu Artifacts to Peru."

Former Connecticut Sen. Christopher Dodd released a statement: “The Machu Picchu artifacts do not belong to any government, to any institution, or to any university. They belong to the people of Peru. I plan to work with both parties to resolve this dispute quickly, amicably, and return the artifacts to their rightful owners.” Tulane’s Verano had “sympathy for both sides”.

In early November 2010, Foreign Minister Jose Garcia Belaunde stated that an agreement was expected soon. Belaunde and Yale President Levin announced that a delegation from Yale would travel to Lima. The delegation was headed by Ernesto Zedillo, the former President of Mexico and director of the Yale Center for the Study of Globalization. After two weeks of negotiations, Yale announced that the collection would be returned in its entirety.

=== Agreements (2010–2011) ===
On November 19, 2010, Peru and Yale reached an agreement that the remains and artifacts would be returned. Peruvian President Alan Garcia made this statement:

The Peruvian government is grateful for this decision and recognizes that Yale University conserved these parts and pieces that otherwise would have been dispersed in private collections throughout the world, and perhaps would have disappeared.

Yale officials made the following statement:

Yale is very pleased with the positive developments in the discussions about the return of Machu Picchu artifacts to Peru... It has always been Yale's desire to reach an agreement that honors Peru's rich history and cultural heritage and recognizes the world's interest in ongoing public and scholarly access to that heritage.

On February 11, 2011, Yale and Universidad Nacional de San Antonio Abad del Cusco (UNSAAC) signed a further agreement that the two institutions would partner to create a museum and research center in Peru. The museum would be at the Inca palace of Casa Concha in Cusco, and would display pottery, stone tools, and human bones. In the 2011 museum deal, The Yale Peabody Museum of Natural History would retain a small portion of the artifacts on loan. Following the agreement, Yale President Richard C. Levin said, "This agreement ensures the expanded accessibility of these Machu Picchu collections for research and public appreciation in their natural context and with the guidance of two great universities.”

Colin Renfrew said “Yale has done the right thing probably if they want a quiet life.” He also said the agreement may encourage further repatriation deals. Sharon Flescher also commented that the settlement shifted the focus from ownership to the artifacts themselves.

=== Joint stewardship (2011 – present) ===
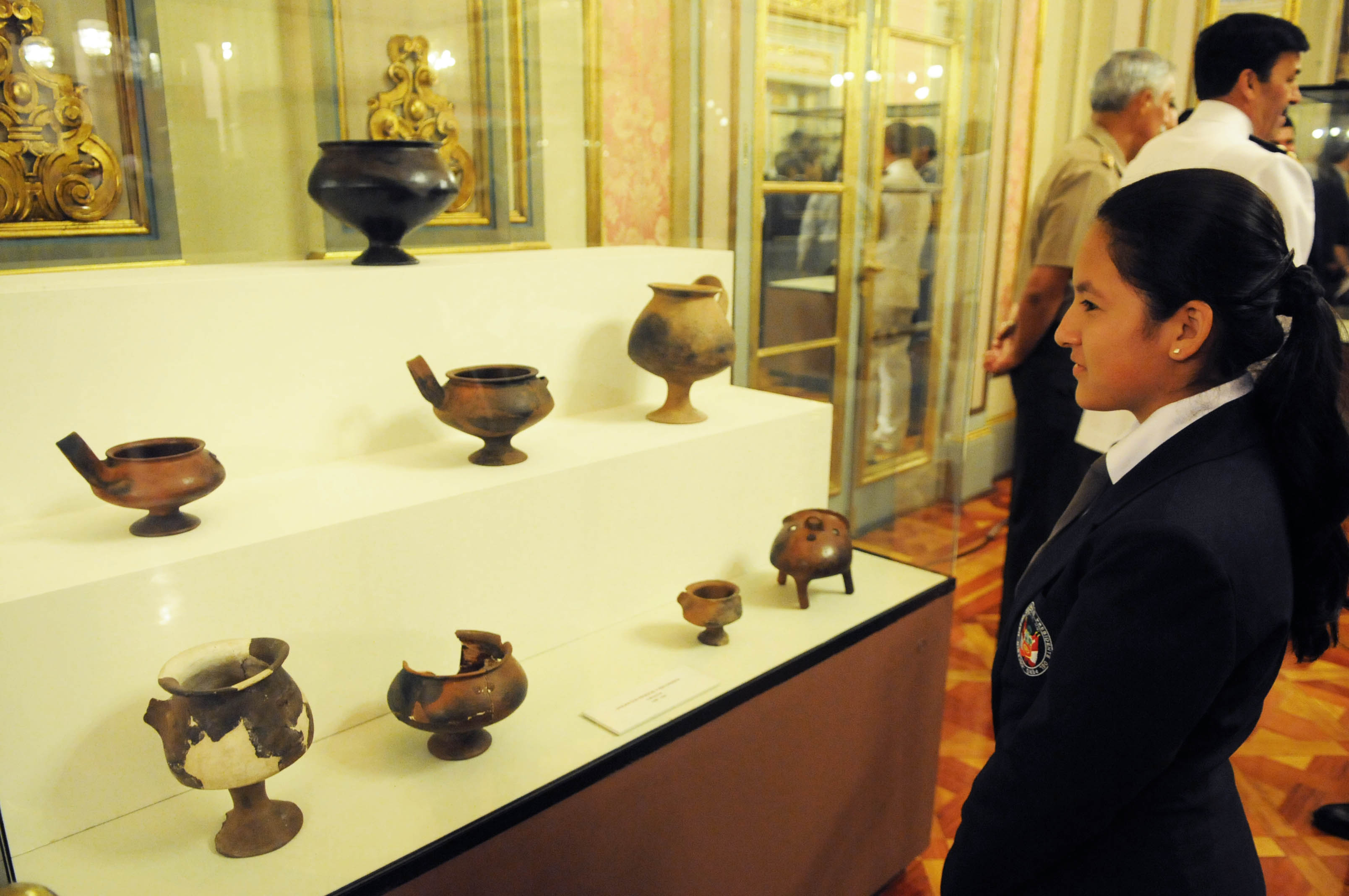
Machu Picchu artifacts on display in Peru in an exhibit titled "Machu Picchu 100 Años Después" ("Machu Picchu 100 Years Later")

The artifacts were returned to Peru in three shipments, made in March 2011, December 2011, and November 2012. Yale financed these. Since their return, the artifacts have been held at the International Center for the Study of Machu Picchu and Inca Culture. Yale and the San Antonio Abad University in Cuzco are co-stewards of the artifacts, and collaborate on scholarly research.

== Significance ==
Irina Petukhova, a professor of psychology at Russian State University for the Humanities in Moscow and a Fulbright scholar at Yale, commented on the significance of the dispute: “I do not think this is a problem of the museum ... This is a political and an ethical problem, and it is certainly a world problem.”

== Collection ==
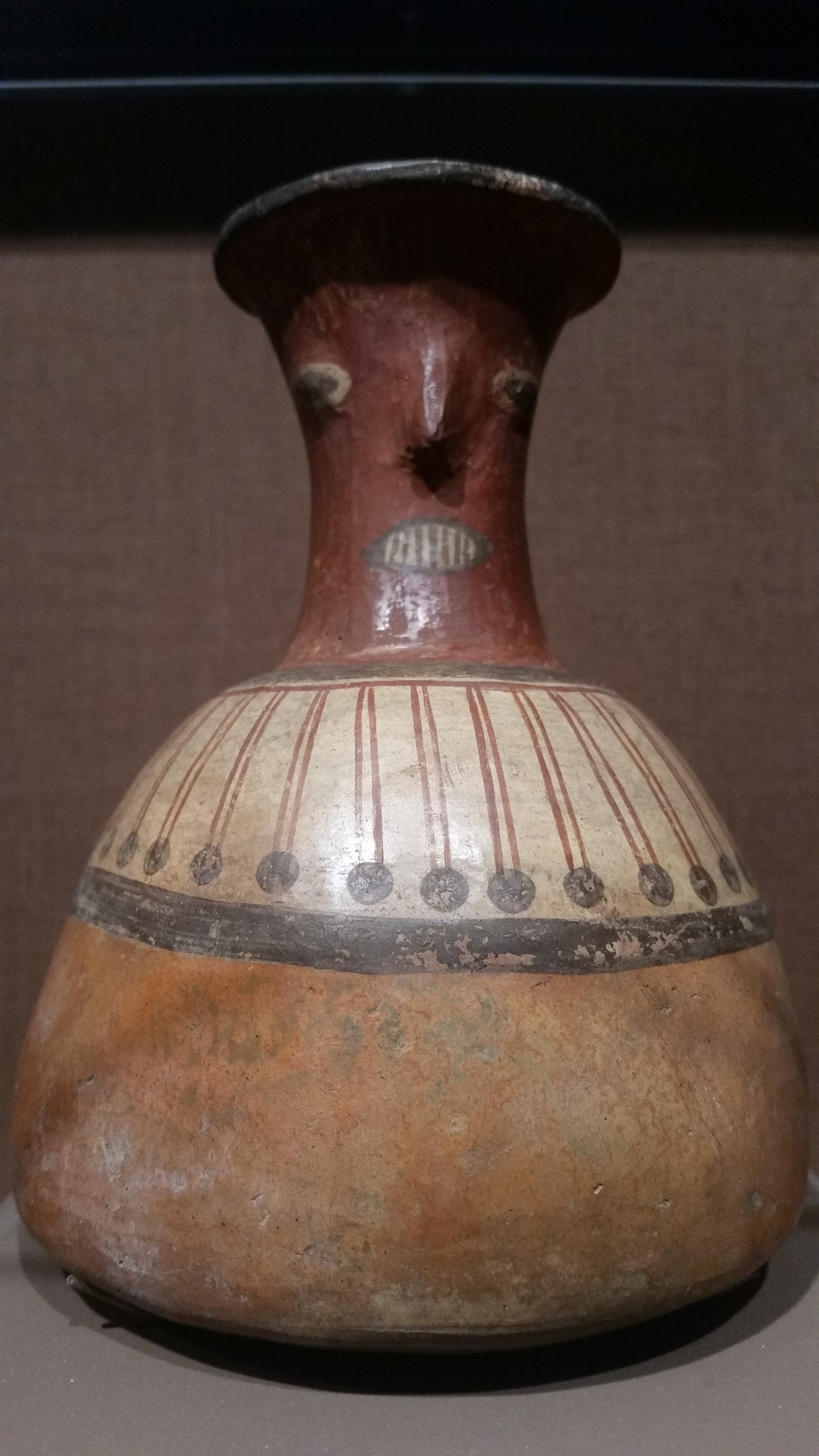
Artifact collected on Bingham's 1912 expedition to Machu Picchu

The collection contains between 4,000 and 40,000 artifacts, though the exact count depends on how the artifacts are catalogued. According to Yale, about 350 of these artifacts are of a high enough quality to display in a museum. Verano stated that although most of the artifacts are fragments and shards not suited for museum display, the collection is nevertheless “one of the most valuable Inca collections there is.” The museum-quality artifacts are mostly ceramics, but also include silver and bronze objects, stoneware cooking implements, and several vases for storing corn beer, an important beverage in Incan daily life. The “research collection” also contains human remains, as well as ceramic fragments.
