= Yonán District =

Coordinates: 7.2538°S 79.1295°W

Yonan
- District
- Interactive map of Yonan
- Country: Peru
- Region: Cajamarca
- Province: Contumazá
- Founded: June 5, 1964
- Capital: Tembladera

Area
  - Total: 547.25 km^{2} (211.29 sq mi)
- Elevation: 420 m (1,380 ft)

Population (2005 census)
  - Total: 7,970
  - Density: 14.6/km^{2} (37.7/sq mi)
- Time zone: UTC-5 (PET)
- UBIGEO: 060508

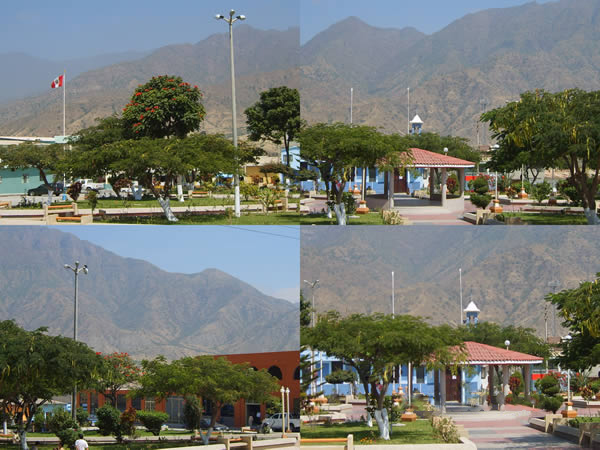
Plaza de Armas in Tembladera, Cajamarca

Yonan District is one of eight districts of the province Contumazá in Peru.
