= Chilete District =

Coordinates: 7.2215°S 78.8390°W

Chilete
- District
- Interactive map of Chilete
- Country: Peru
- Region: Cajamarca
- Province: Contumazá
- Founded: January 30, 1933
- Capital: Chilete

Government
  - Mayor: Arturo Plasencia Castillo

Area
  - Total: 133.94 km^{2} (51.71 sq mi)
- Elevation: 847 m (2,779 ft)

Population (2005 census)
  - Total: 3,247
  - Density: 24.24/km^{2} (62.79/sq mi)
- Time zone: UTC-5 (PET)
- UBIGEO: 060502

Chilete District is one of eight districts of the province Contumazá in Peru.
