= Guzmango District =

Coordinates: 7.3848°S 78.8963°W

Guzmango
- District
- Interactive map of Guzmango
- Country: Peru
- Region: Cajamarca
- Province: Contumazá
- Capital: Guzmango

Government
  - Mayor: Hiladio Agapito Loje Calvanapon

Area
  - Total: 49.88 km^{2} (19.26 sq mi)
- Elevation: 2,578 m (8,458 ft)

Population (2005 census)
  - Total: 3,039
  - Density: 60.93/km^{2} (157.8/sq mi)
- Time zone: UTC-5 (PET)
- UBIGEO: 060504

Guzmango District is one of eight districts of Contumazá Province in Peru.
