= Tantarica District =

Coordinates: 7.2133°S 78.9277°W

Tantarica
- District
- Interactive map of Tantarica
- Country: Peru
- Region: Cajamarca
- Province: Contumazá
- Founded: February 28, 1964
- Capital: Catan

Government
  - Mayor: Gerardo Gilberto Merino Carrera

Area
  - Total: 149.7 km^{2} (57.8 sq mi)
- Elevation: 2,180 m (7,150 ft)

Population (2005 census)
  - Total: 2,588
  - Density: 17.29/km^{2} (44.78/sq mi)
- Time zone: UTC-5 (PET)
- UBIGEO: 060507
- Website: munitantarica.gob.pe

Tantarica District is one of eight districts of the province Contumazá in Peru.
