= San Benito, Peru =

San Benito Donde el sol toma su brillo
- Interactive map of San Benito
- Coordinates: 7°25′30″S 78°55′38.65″W
- Country: Peru
- Region: Cajamarca
- Province: Contumazá
- District: San Benito

Government
  - Mayor: --
- Elevation: 1,370 m (4,490 ft)

San Benito is a District of the Contumazá Province in the Cajamarca Region of Peru.
