= Richard L. Burger =

American archaeologist and anthropologist (born 1950)

- Born: Manhattan, New York, United States
- Education: Yale College, University of California, Berkeley
- Known for: Research on Andean civilization
- Scientific career
- Fields: Anthropology, Archaeology
- Workplaces: Yale University
- Doctoral advisor: John H. Rowe

Richard Lewis Burger, Ph.D. (University of California, Berkeley, 1978), is an archaeologist and anthropologist from the United States. He is currently a professor at Yale University and holds the positions of Charles J. MacCurdy Professor in the Anthropology Department, Chair of the Council on Archaeological Studies, and Curator in the Division of Anthropology at the Peabody Museum of Natural History. He has carried out archaeological excavations in the Peruvian Andes since 1975, publishing several books and many articles on Chavin culture, a pre-Hispanic civilization that developed in the northern Andean highlands of Peru from 1000 BC to 400 BC. Burger is married to Lucy Salazar, a Peruvian archaeologist and long time collaborator on many research projects. His former doctoral student Sabine Hyland has become well known as an Andean anthropologist.

== Education ==
Burger received his education in the public schools of Great Neck, New York. He went on to get his bachelor's degree in archaeology at Yale College (1972) where he studied under Thomas Patterson and Michael Coe. He received a doctorate in anthropology from the University of California, Berkeley (1978) where he studied under John Howland Rowe and Dorothy Menzel.

== Career ==
Burger began teaching as a faculty member at Yale University in 1981. During his tenure at Yale, he has been Chair of the Anthropology Department (1990–1994), Director of the Peabody Museum of Natural History (1995–2002). He has also taught in Peru at the National University of San Marcos and Pontifical Catholic University of Peru. Burger is also an honorary member of the faculties of the University of Cusco and the University of Iquitos. He is co-curator in the Museo Machu Picchu, Casa Concha in Cusco, Peru, and has been president of the Institute of Andean Research in New York since 2006.

Burger's archaeological fieldwork has focused on the northern highlands and central coast of the Peruvian Andes. His research focuses on the emergence and development of early civilizations in the Central Andes and he has illuminated the ways that religious institutions rather than stratified states are involved in the rise of complex societies in the case of the Andes. Burger has carried out field projects in the highlands of the Department of Ancash at the sites of Chavín de Huantar (1975–1976), Huaricoto (1978–1980), as well as in the Lurín Valley just south of Lima at the sites of Cardal (1984–1987, 2007–2008, 2017–2019), Mina Perdida (1990–1991, 1993–1994), and Manchay Bajo (1998–1999).

Burger helped to pioneer the sourcing of cinnabar in the Andes with geochemist Colin Cooke and did important research on Andean diet using carbon isotopes from Machu Picchu, Chavin de Huantarl and Cardal. Burger located the seven major obsidian sources used in ancient Peru and used this analysis to describe the changing patterns of trade in volcanic glass in the pre-Hispanic Andes. This work on obsidian sourcing was based on a series of archaeological surveys that Burger conducted in the south-central highlands of Department of Huancavelica (1999–2000) and Department of Ayacucho (2003–2006).

With Lucy Salazar, Burger co-curated a block-buster traveling exhibit on MachuPicchu that traveled for two years to seven cities in the United States from 2003 to 2005. Burger and Salazar played a vital role in Yale University's repatriation and exhibition of Hiram Bingham's Machu Picchu collections in Cuzco at the Museo Machu Picchu, Casa Concha.

== Selected works ==
- Chavin and the Origins of Andean Civilization, New York: Thames and Hudson, 1992, p. 240, ISBN 0-500-05069-4.
- The Prehistoric Occupation of Chavin de Huántar, Peru, University of California Publications in Anthropology. Vol. 14. Berkeley/Los Angeles: University of California Press, 1984.
- Machu Picchu: Unveiling the mystery of the Incas. Burger, Richard L., and Lucy Salazar Burger, eds. New Haven: Yale University Press, 2004.
- The Life and Writings of Julio C. Tello. America's First Indigenous Archaeologist, Iowa: University of Iowa Press, 2010, p. 382, ISBN 978-1-58729-783-0.
