= Chavín de Huántar =

Archaeological site in Peru

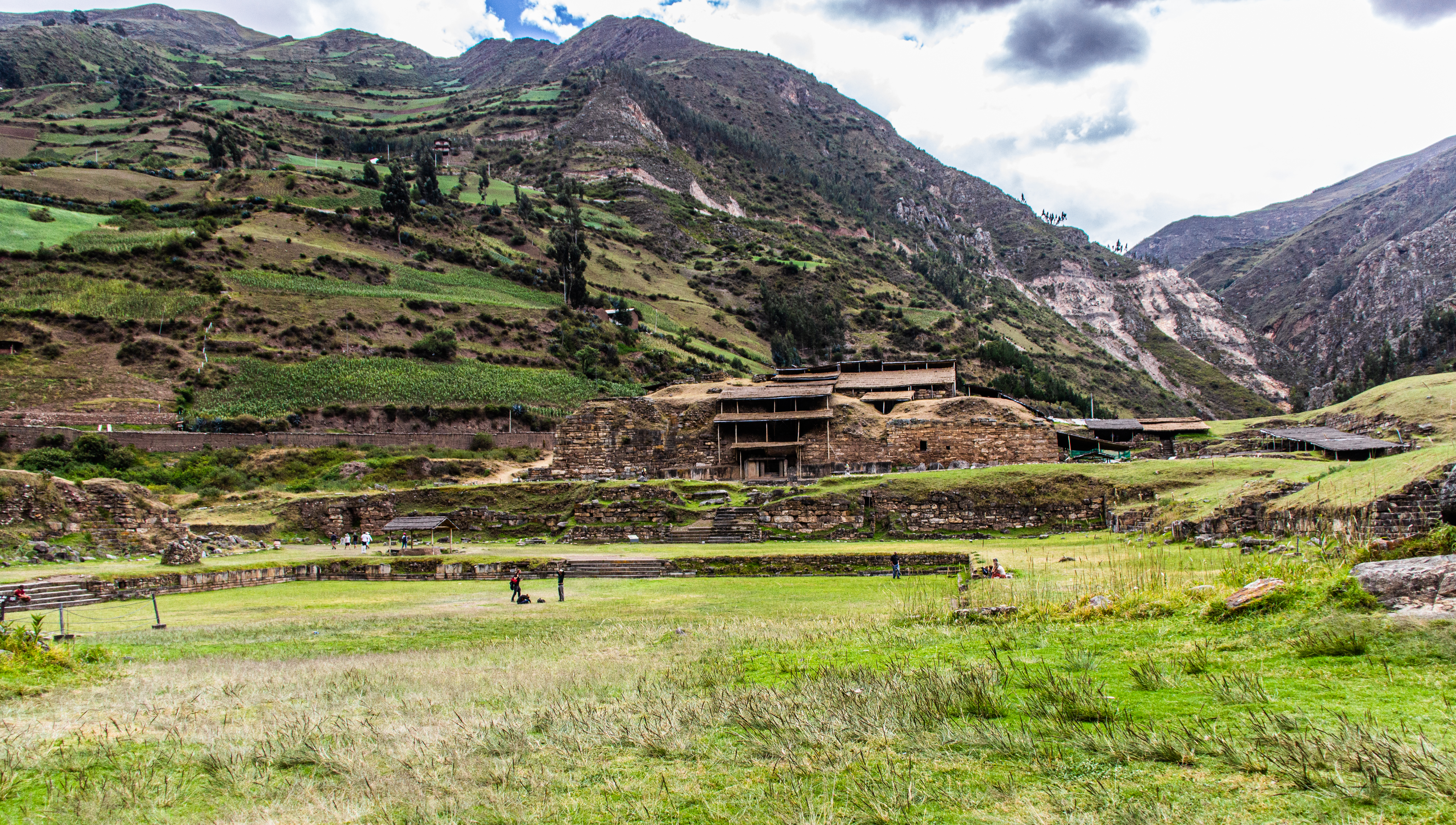
- Overview of Chavín de Huántar

- Location within Peru
- 9°35′34″S 77°10′42″W
- Cultures: Chavín culture
- Location: Ancash Region, Peru

History
- Built: Before 1200 BC; 3225–3226 years ago

Site notes
- Height: 3,180 metres (10,430 ft)

UNESCO World Heritage Site
- Official name: Chavín (Archaeological Site)
- Criteria: Cultural: (iii)
- Reference: 330
- Inscription: 1985 (9th Session)
- Area: 14.79 ha (36.5 acres; 1,592,000 sq ft)

Chavín de Huántar is an archaeological site in Peru, containing ruins and artifacts constructed as early as 1200 BC, and occupied until around 400–500 BC by the Chavín, a major pre-Inca culture. The site is located in the Ancash Region, 434 kilometers (270 mi) north of Lima, at an elevation of 3,180 meters (10,430 ft), east of the Cordillera Blanca at the start of the Conchucos Valley.

Chavín de Huántar has been designated as a UNESCO World Heritage Site. Some of the Chavín relics from this archaeological site are on display in the Museo de la Nación in Lima and the Museo Nacional de Chavín in Chavín itself.

Occupation at Chavín de Huántar has been carbon-dated to at least 3000 BC, with ceremonial center activity occurring primarily toward the end of the second millennium, and through the middle of the first millennium BC. While the fairly large population was based on an agricultural economy, the city's location at the headwaters of the Marañón River, between the coast and the jungle, made it an ideal location for the dissemination and collection of both ideas and material goods. This archaeological site is a large ceremonial center that has revealed a great deal about the Chavín culture. Chavín de Huántar served as a gathering place for people of the region to come together and worship. The transformation of the center into a valley-dominating monument made it a pan-regional place of importance. People went to Chavín de Huántar as a center: to attend and participate in rituals, consult an oracle, or enter a cult.

Findings at Chavín de Huántar indicate that social instability and upheaval began to occur between 500 and 300 BC, at the same time that the larger Chavín culture began to decline. Large ceremonial sites were abandoned, some unfinished, and were replaced by villages and agricultural land. At Chavín de Huántar, no later than 500 BC, a small village replaced the Circular Plaza. The plaza was occupied by a succession of cultural groups, and residents salvaged building stones and stone carvings to use in house walls. Multiple occupation floors indicate the village was continuously occupied through the 1940s.

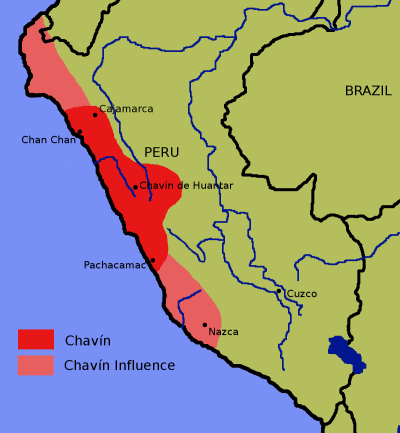
The area of the Chavín and site of Chavín de Huántar

== Toponymy ==
The name Chavín derives from the Quechua term chawpi[n], meaning "center" or "middle", and the Quechua term waantar, which refers to an Andean plant classified as Cortaderia rudiuscula Stapf. Indeed, the archaeological site is situated at the angle formed by the confluence of the Mosna and Huachejsa rivers, adjacent to the small Andean town of the same name.

== Site description ==
The Chavín civilization was centered on the site of Chavín de Huántar, the religious center of the Chavín people and the political capital. The temple is a massive flat-topped pyramid surrounded by lower platforms. It is a U-shaped plaza with a sunken circular court in the center. The inside of the temple walls are decorated with sculptures and carvings. During its heyday, Chavín de Huántar was used as a religious center for ceremonies and events, perhaps a home for an oracle. The site contains a number of major structures, including Temples A, B, C and D, and areas and buildings designated as the Major Plaza, the Circular Plaza, the Old Temple and New Temple. But the latter two designations are no longer accurate in light of recent research advances.

Chavín de Huántar was constructed over many stages starting prior to 1200 BC, with most major construction over by 750 BC. The site continued in use as a ceremonial center until around 500 BC, but its primary religious function had ceased prior to 400 BC. The site was increasingly occupied by casual residents of the highly distinct Huaraz cultural tradition.

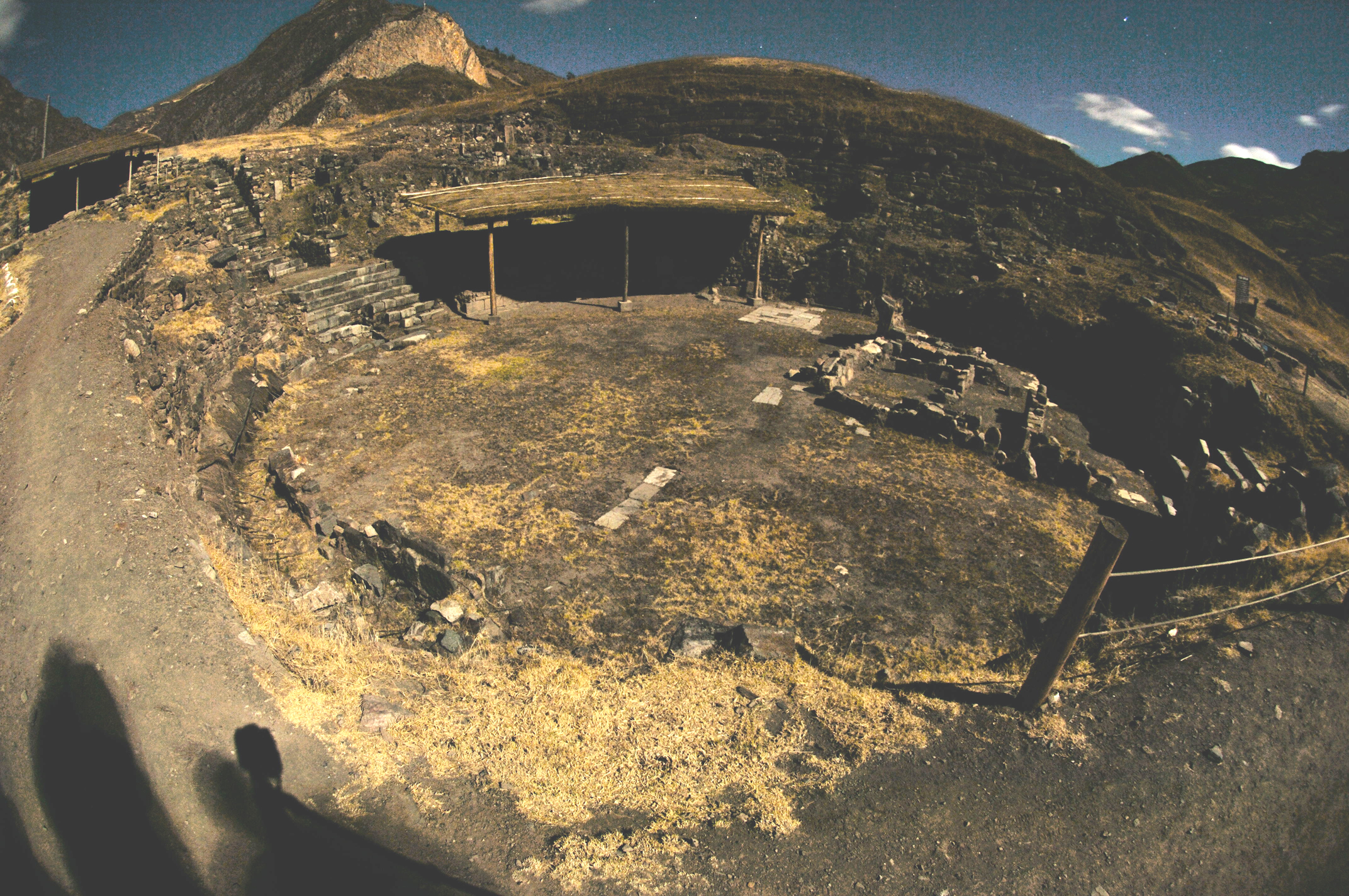
The Circular Plaza at Chavín in 2005.

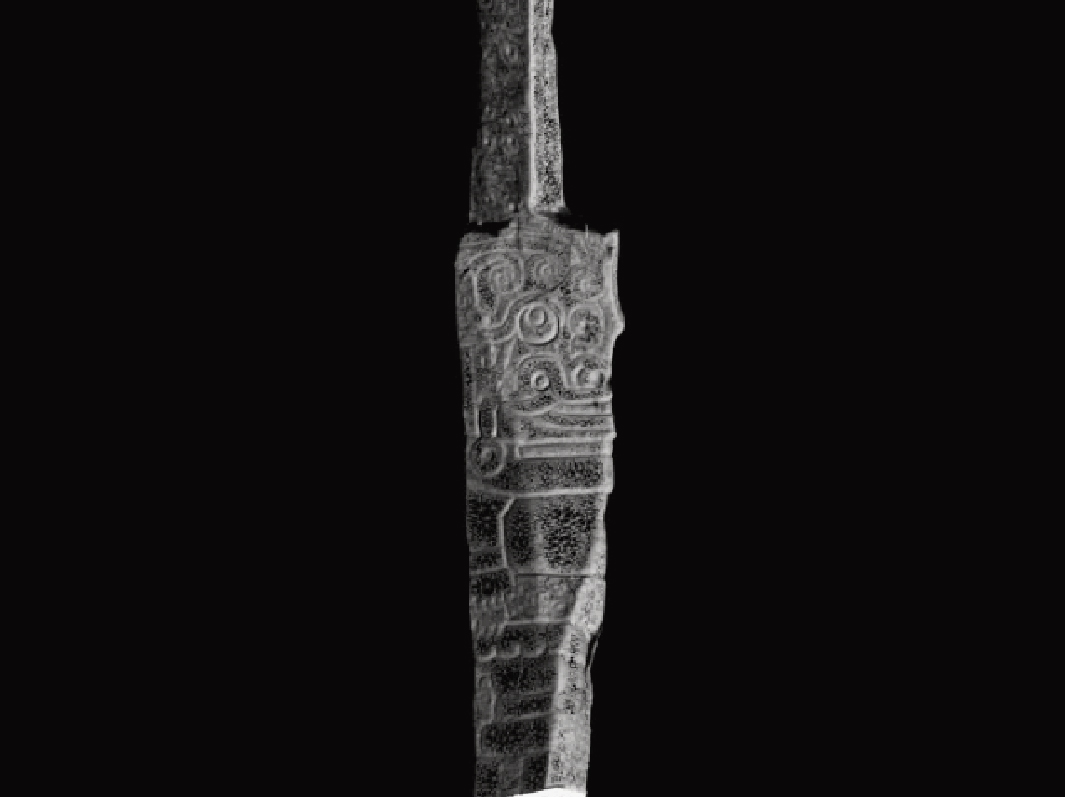
The Lanzón Stela at Chavín, still image from a video of a photo-textured point cloud using laser scan data collected by nonprofit CyArk.

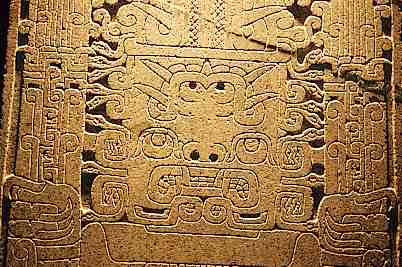
Detail of the stone engraving known as the Raimondi Stela, probably from the site of Chavín de Huántar.

The "Circular Plaza" appears to have been a sacred and ritually important, open-air space within a ceremonial center. Prior to 800–700 BC, this location had a number of functions, including serving as an atrium for entering Temple A through the temple's north staircase.

The plaza in the classic period, after 700 BC, is bounded on three sides by major Temples A, B, and C. The plaza is perfectly circular and is close to 20 metres (66 ft) in diameter, with a floor consisted of pillow-shaped pavers of yellow diatomite. It appears that a center line of black limestone blocks runs on its architectural east-west axis. Walls of the plaza were constructed of cut stone, principally granite, laid in courses of varying width. The two broadest courses were carved in arcs closest to the western staircase and in two pairs of terminal stones flanking the eastern staircase.

The "Old Temple", dating from the site's early history, was an inward-facing structure composed primarily of passageways built around a circular courtyard. The structure contained obelisks and stone monuments with relief carvings depicting jaguars, caimans, and other forms with anthropomorphic features. The Lanzón Gallery, located at the very center, contained a sculpture of the Lanzón, which is assumed to be a supreme deity of Chavín de Huántar. The figure is anthropomorphic, with a feline head and human body. Mortars, pestles, conch-shell trumpets, and many other items have also been found. Many of these artifacts have an anthropomorphic design or decoration and are thought to be associated with Chavín rituals.

The "New Temple", constructed between 500 and 200 BC, is also based on a gallery and plaza design and contained many relief sculptures. The Lanzon deity is shown here, holding a strombus shell in the right hand, while the left hand holds a Spondylus shell, considered to have sacred properties.

The architectural design of Chavín de Huántar changed over time as an old temple development was added to with a new temple. Changes were more complex than in one stage of renovation. Smaller renovations happened consistently over the Chavín horizon, ending by about 500 BC, when the new temple was completed. With the simpler design of the old temple, Chavín de Huántar followed the U-shaped ceremonial center design accompanied by a sunken circular plaza that was typical of many coastal settlements in the Early Horizon period.

After the new temple was complete, Chavín de Huántar still embodied a U-shaped ceremonial center design. The renovations enlarged the site considerably and added a larger, sunken rectangular plaza. The main objective of the renovations appears to have been to enable more people to gather in one place, as the site in general expanded.

Excavation of burial sites has given evidence of a small elite class, whose tombs contained elaborate burial goods, consisting of precious metals, colorful textiles, and other valuables. Most burials were simpler, with bodies interred in shallow pits, dressed in cotton clothing and accompanied by a simple tool kit.

Local style in art and decoration included scrolls, simple curves, straight lines, and images of wild animals. Chavín sculpture is usually of white granite and black limestone. Carved stone mortars and pestles, conch-shell trumpets, bone tubes and spatulas, and metal spatulas and spoons were found decorated in Chavín style, as were various textiles including tapestries. Pottery was found in a wide variety of forms, including bottles and bowls, decorated with a wider range of distinctive elements.

== Social structure ==
In Chavin de Huantar the surrounding city and rural areas around the ceremonial centers show social inequalities. More gold jewelry, well-made ceramics, and higher-quality meals are available in the town east of the temple than in the village to the west. Investigations done by archaeologists show that people on both sides of the river were artists who created jewelry and other items carved out of bone. Spondylus shells, known for being precious goods at the time, were made into beads by locals who lived close to the temples. This shows an implication that artists were likely of high social status. People who lived closer to the temples were supplied with only the finest meat, usually llama meat. This llama meat was brought by the residents of the surrounding high-altitude communities. In contrast, those who lived in rural areas consumed lower-quality food and used chert tools, while those who lived in urban areas imported high-quality obsidian to create sharper blades. Llama meat could be said to be freeze-fried to produce charqui which is the inspiration for modern-day beef jerky. Llama meat was extremely important as it was eaten by almost all the inhabitants in the area. Those who lived in the western half of the town ate younger and more delectable animals as opposed to the eastern side of town, whose residents ate lower-quality meat. These clear examples of social hierarchies show the differences between the people inside of town and those who lived in rural areas. While these social differences can be seen it is impossible to say how much of this social order was changed into a class system with multiple levels.

== Site significance ==
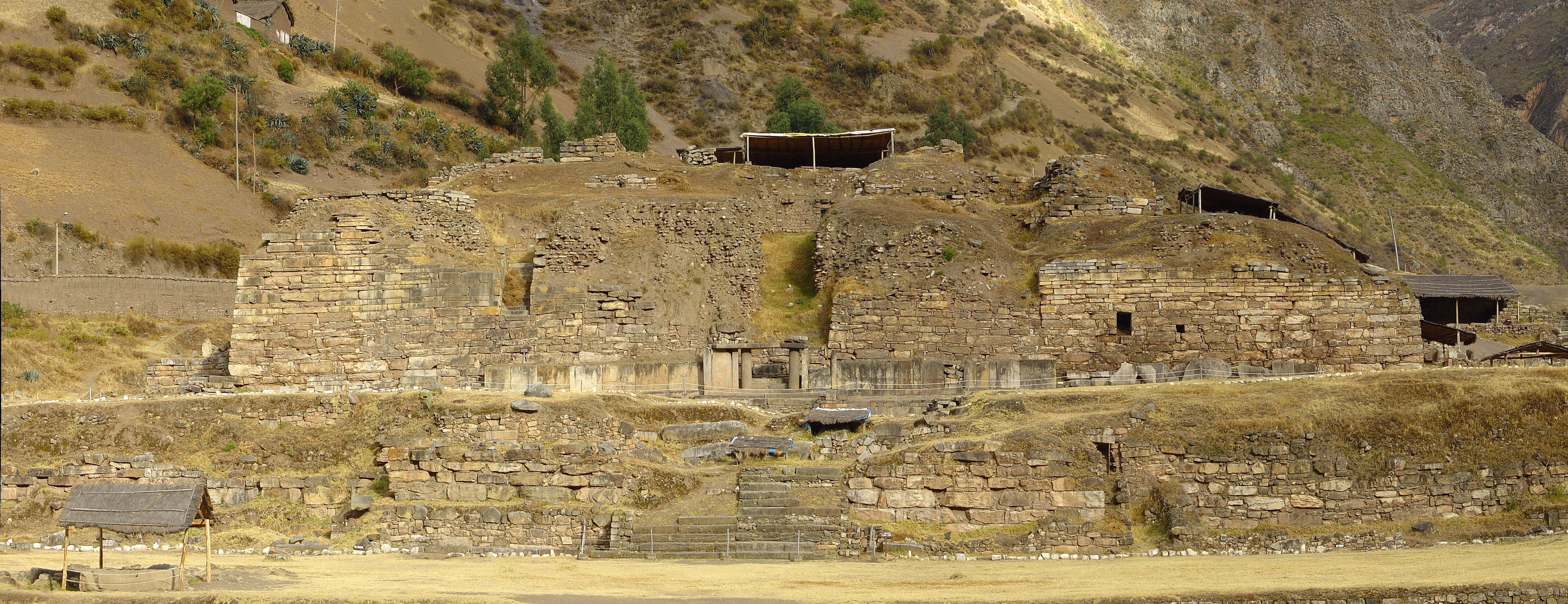
El Castillo, part of the Chavín de Huántar ruins

The site was described by early 20th-century Peruvian archaeologist Julio C. Tello as "the birthplace of South American culture", in recognition of its significance as a center of power for the Chavín culture, which he believed was the oldest in the highlands. Chavín de Huántar is located north of modern-day Lima at the confluence of two rivers: the Mosna and the Huanchecsa. This site allowed for easy access by the waterways and, at the same time, limited access to outsiders.

But discoveries and excavations since the late 20th century have established the older Norte Chico, also known as Caral-Supe, as the site of the first civilization in the Americas and what is now Peru. Dated to 5,000 years ago, it covered an area across four river valleys, about 100 miles north of Lima.

Chavín de Huántar is located in a lowland valley at the confluence of the Mosna and the Huanchecsa. High altitude valleys are located nearby. Consequently, the people at Chavín de Huántar were able to cultivate both lowland crops such as maize and high altitude crops such as potatoes. The people were also domesticating llamas in the high altitude areas for food and to serve as transport animals, to carry heavy loads on the steep slopes of the hills.

The religious significance of Chavín de Huántar was inspired by the geography of the site. The confluence of two large rivers has been considered to have spiritual importance in many cultures. Similarly, Chavín de Huántar was developed as a religious ceremonial center. The confluence of two rivers is referred to as tinkuy, which can be defined as the harmonious meeting of opposing forces. Chavín de Huántar likely was thought to have been a meeting place of natural and cosmic forces. The area is known to have natural hot springs and an awe-inspiring view of the Wantsan peak, both of which may have added to the religious significance of the site.

== Early religious practices ==
Archaeologists continue to debate about the likely religious practices during the peak period at Chavín de Huántar. In the 1970s Peruvian Luis Lumbreras visited the site and learned some of the oral history from the locals. They believe the word Chavín comes from the Quechua word, chaupin, meaning center, expressing its significance to local indigenous communities at the time. After investigation at the site, Lumbreas theorized that elites in the communities may have developed the ritual at the site. He also believed that they may have persuaded followers to the temple in order to maintain their political and social structure.

== 2000 to present ==
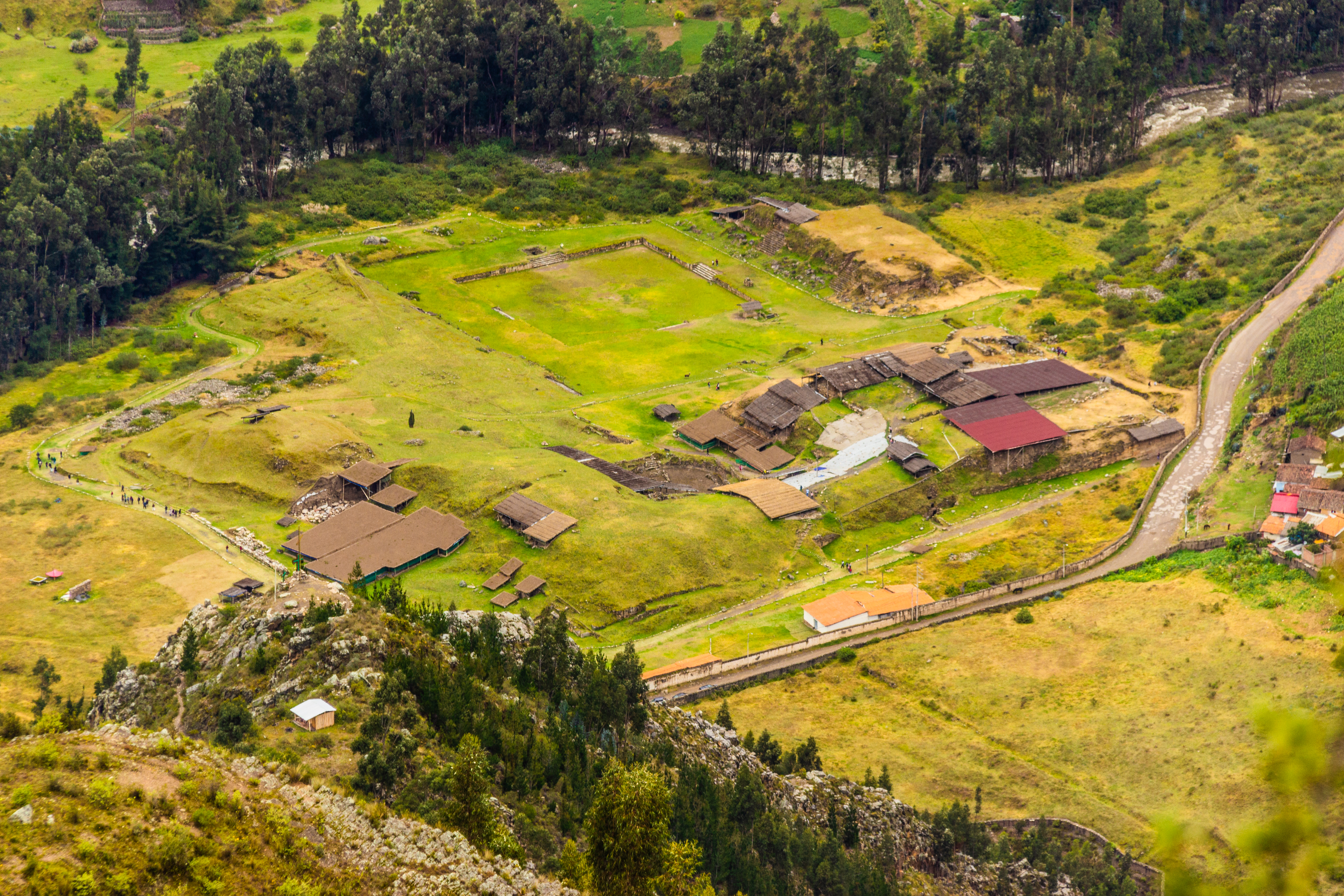
Aerial view of the archaeological site

In the early 2000s John Rick and his team from Stanford University came to similar conclusions about the development of religious practices. Rick theorizes that the higher-ups (typically priests) at the temple would use deliberate techniques, material goods, and intricate architectural features to persuade and gain followers. These theories could be evidence that the temple and the priests in it exercised much power over local communities during its peak period.

Rick also studied the site with laser scanning in an effort to determine whether it was "planned by an elite or had resulted from some grassroots religious fervor." The technique was used to create digital blueprints. Because details such as stair placement remain constant throughout generations of builders, the site may be a very early example of the use of a standardized building code.

Beginning in 2004, the Global Heritage Fund (GHF) began conservation work at this UNESCO World Heritage Site. Their work is also directed at supporting local training and development of skills among the residents. According to GHF, their work has involved:

stabilizing primary monuments, repairing underground structures, documenting the site with high precision instruments, locating underground structures with non-intrusive technologies, revealing, assessing and when appropriate removing post-Chavín structures to reveal original architecture; cataloguing artifacts, and improving site interpretation facilities, while the local community is engaged through conservation and craft training, employment, tourism entrepreneurship and regular consultations regarding the management of the site and its environs."

CyArk has made a slideshow, maps, and 3-D multimedia presentations about Chavín de Huántar available, based on its 2005–2006 laser scanning and digital preservation project.

In 2018, Rick's group used four-wheel-drive robots to search the temple. They discovered 30 tunnels, as well as the graves of several people buried under rocks. Further research is needed to study the human remains and any associated grave goods.

== See also ==
- Iperu, tourist information and assistance
- Operation Chavín de Huántar, said to be named by President Alberto Fujimori for the operations use of tunnels like the passageways of Huántar
- Tourism in Peru
- Stela of the cactus bearer
- List of oldest buildings in the Americas
- List of archaeological sites in Peru

== Sources ==
- Abate, Tom (17 Jan 2012). "Laser mapping tool traces ancient sites – Device made for contractors helps archaeologists create first-ever digital blueprints". SFGate – Innovations. San Francisco Chronicle. Archived from the original on 4 Jun 2019.
- Burger, Richard L (2008). "Chavín de Huántar and Its Sphere of Influence". In Silverman, Helaine; Isbell, William (eds.). Chavín de Huántar and itItsphere of Influence. Handbook of South American Archaeology. Vol. Sphere of Influence. Springer. pp. 681–703. doi:10.1007/978-0-387-74907-5_35. ISBN 978-0-387-74906-8.
- Gimeno, Fernando (21 Aug 2018). "Robots reveal possible 3,000-year-old human sacrifices in Peru". efe-epa. Archived from the original on 21 Aug 2018.
- Gasparovic, Mike (12 Dec 2020). "Visiting Chavín de Huántar – Horizon Guides". horizontravelpress.com. Archived from the original on 28 Sep 2020.
- Kembel, Silvia Rodriguez; Rick, John W (2004). "4 Building authority at Chavín de Huántar: Models of social organization and development in the initial period and early horizon". In Silverman, Helaine (ed.). Andean archaeology. Wiley / Blackwell. pp. 51–76. ISBN 978-0631234005.
- Rick, John W (2005). "The Evolution of Authority and Power at Chavín de Huántar, Peru". Archeological Papers of the American Anthropological Association. 14: 71–89. doi:10.1525/ap3a.2004.14.071.
- Risvetski, John (2006). "Laser Scanning for Cultural Heritage Applications". Professional Surveyor Magazine. 26 (3 (March)). Archived from the original on 16 Oct 2014.
- Sayre, Matthew Paul (2010). Life Across the River: Agricultural, Ritual, and Production Practices at Chavín de Huántar, Peru (PhD diss.). UC Berkeley.
