= Contumazá province =

Coordinates: 7.369050°S 78.806539°W

Contumazá
- Province
- Location of Contumazá in the Cajamarca Region
- Country: Peru
- Region: Cajamarca
- Capital: Contumazá

Government
  - Mayor: Carlos Alberto Muguerza Alva

Area
  - Total: 2,070.33 km^{2} (799.36 sq mi)
- Elevation: 2,674 m (8,773 ft)

Population
  - Total: 32,406
  - Density: 15.653/km^{2} (40.540/sq mi)
- UBIGEO: 0605

Contumazá is a province of the Cajamarca Region in Peru.

== Political division ==
The province measures 2,070.33 square kilometres (799.36 sq mi) and is divided into eight districts:

District	Mayor	Capital	Ubigeo
Chilete	Arturo Plasencia Castillo	Chilete	060502
Contumazá	Carlos Alberto Muguerza Alva	Contumazá	060501
Cupisnique	Tulio Yban Saldaña Gomez	Trinidad	060503
Guzmango	Hiladio Agapito Loje Calvanapon	Guzmango	060504
San Benito	N	San Benito	060505
Santa Cruz de Toledo	Arsenio Wilfredo Plasencia Plasencia	Santa Cruz De Toledo	060506
Tantarica	Gerardo Gilberto Merino Carrera	Catán	060507
Yonán	N	Tembladera	060508
