= Cupisnique District =

Cupisnique
- District
- Interactive map of Cupisnique
- Coordinates: 7°22′S 79°03′W
- Country: Peru
- Region: Cajamarca
- Province: Contumazá
- Founded: February 20, 1964
- Capital: Trinidad

Government
  - Mayor: Tulio Yban Saldaña Gomez

Area
  - Total: 280.2 km^{2} (108.2 sq mi)
- Elevation: 1,875 m (6,152 ft)

Population (2005 census)
  - Total: 1,657
  - Density: 5.914/km^{2} (15.32/sq mi)
- Time zone: UTC-5 (PET)
- UBIGEO: 060503

Cupisnique District is one of eight districts of the province Contumazá in Peru.
