= San Benito District =

Coordinates: 7.4255°S 78.9269°W

San Benito
- District
- Interactive map of San Benito
- Country: Peru
- Region: Cajamarca
- Province: Contumazá
- Founded: November 19, 1888
- Capital: San Benito

Area
  - Total: 486.55 km^{2} (187.86 sq mi)
- Elevation: 1,370 m (4,490 ft)

Population (2005 census)
  - Total: 3,613
  - Density: 7.426/km^{2} (19.23/sq mi)
- Time zone: UTC-5 (PET)
- UBIGEO: 060505

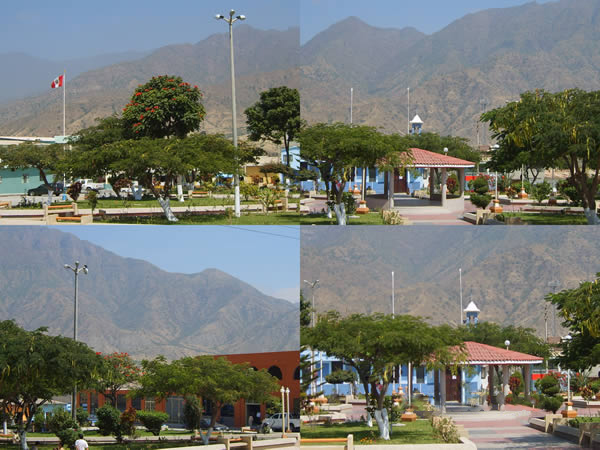

San Benito District is one of eight districts of Contumazá Province in Peru.
