= Contumazá =

- Village
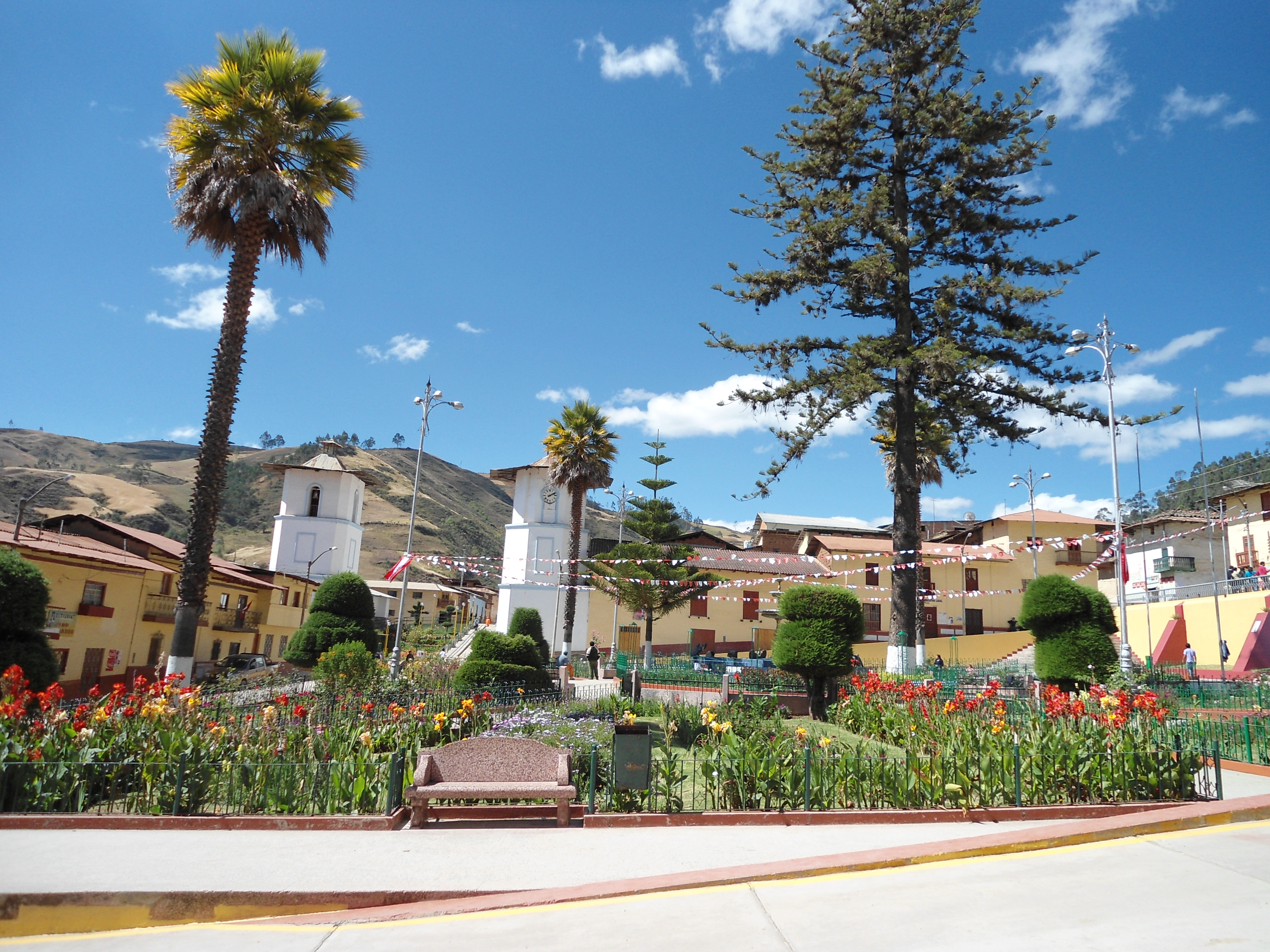

- Location within Peru
- Coordinates: 7°21′59.46″S 78°48′18.42″W
- Country: Peru
- Region: Cajamarca
- Province: Contumazá
- District: Contumazá

Government
  - Mayor: Carlos Alberto Muguerza Alva
- Elevation: 2,674 m (8,773 ft)
- Time zone: UTC-5 (PET)

Contumazá is a town in Northern Peru, capital of the province Contumazá in the region Cajamarca.

== Climate ==
Contumazá has a subtropical highland climate (Köppen: Cwb) characterized by mild temperatures and a distinct wet and dry seasons.

The total annual precipitation is 727.1 millimeters (28.63 inches). Contumazá receives the majority of its precipitation during the wet season, which typically spans from January to April. March is the wettest month, receiving an average of 230 millimetres (9.1 in) of precipitation. The months from May to November typically receive significantly reduced rainfall, with July and August receiving almost no rainfall.

Contumazá experiences relatively stable temperatures throughout the year, with minor variations between months. The dry season experiences larger diurnal air temperature variation, with warmer days and cooler nights, compared to the wet season. The yearly average high temperature is 20.3°C (68.5°F), while the yearly average low temperature is 9.3°C (48.7°F).

Climate data for Contumazá (1991–2020)
Month	Jan	Feb	Mar	Apr	May	Jun	Jul	Aug	Sep	Oct	Nov	Dec	Year
Mean daily maximum °C (°F)	19.2 (66.6)	18.9 (66.0)	19.0 (66.2)	19.6 (67.3)	20.7 (69.3)	21.4 (70.5)	21.5 (70.7)	21.6 (70.9)	21.2 (70.2)	20.4 (68.7)	20.1 (68.2)	19.7 (67.5)	20.3 (68.5)
Mean daily minimum °C (°F)	9.9 (49.8)	10.4 (50.7)	10.6 (51.1)	10.0 (50.0)	9.0 (48.2)	7.8 (46.0)	7.5 (45.5)	8.0 (46.4)	9.0 (48.2)	9.6 (49.3)	9.3 (48.7)	10.0 (50.0)	9.3 (48.7)
Average precipitation mm (inches)	78.5 (3.09)	165.0 (6.50)	231.6 (9.12)	104.5 (4.11)	24.7 (0.97)	4.9 (0.19)	1.4 (0.06)	1.2 (0.05)	9.2 (0.36)	24.4 (0.96)	28.7 (1.13)	53.0 (2.09)	727.1 (28.63)
Source: NOAA

== Culture ==
The city is known for its religious celebrations. On January 10, 2026, the Ministry of Culture declared the Holy Week of Contumazá as Cultural Heritage of the Nation, recognizing its historical value and syncretism.
