= Contumazá District =

Coordinates: 7.3659°S 78.8039°W

Contumazá
- District
- Interactive map of Contumazá
- Country: Peru
- Region: Cajamarca
- Province: Contumazá
- Capital: Contumazá

Government
  - Mayor: Carlos Alberto Muguerza Alva

Area
  - Total: 358.28 km^{2} (138.33 sq mi)
- Elevation: 2,674 m (8,773 ft)

Population (2005 census)
  - Total: 9,195
  - Density: 25.66/km^{2} (66.47/sq mi)
- Time zone: UTC-5 (PET)
- UBIGEO: 060501

Contumazá District is one of eight districts of the province Contumazá in Peru.
