= Douglas Sharon =

Canadian cultural anthropologist

Douglas G. Sharon
- Born: January 23, 1941 (age 85)
- Education: University of California, Los Angeles
- Known for: Studying Peruvian uses of entheogenic and medicinal plants
- Scientific career
- Fields: Anthropology
- Workplaces: University of California, Los Angeles

Douglas Sharon is a Canadian cultural anthropologist (UCLA), ethnobotanist and shamanism scholar who has directed both the University of California/Berkeley's Phoebe Hearst Museum of Anthropology and the San Diego Museum of Man. He has conducted more than 40 years of field research and published on pre-Columbian and modern shamanic practices in Peru, Mexico, Guatemala, Ecuador and Bolivia.

His ethnographic film entitled Eduardo the Healer is utilized in university-level anthropology courses and has won awards at the American, Modern Language, and John Muir Medical film festivals. Sharon directs projects in cultural anthropology and lectures internationally on the integration of traditional healing practices with modern public health systems.

== Bibliography ==
=== As a sole author ===
- Wizard of the Four Winds—A Shaman's Story (1978). New. York: The Free Press.
- Shamanism & the sacred cactus: ethnoarchaeological evidence for San Pedro use in northern Perú (2000). San Diego: San Diego Museum of Man.

=== As an editor ===
- Mesas & Cosmologies in Mesoamerica (2003) (ed.). San Diego: San Diego Museum of Man.

=== As coauthor ===
- Sorcery and Shamanism: Curanderos and Clients in Northern Peru with Donald Joralemon. (1993) Salt Lake City: University of Utah.

=== Academic Articles ===
- A Peruvian Curandero’s Séance: Power and Balance by Sharon, Douglas C. (1976). In The Realm of the Extra-Human: Agents and Audiences (9th International Congress of Anthropological and Ethnological Sciences, Chicago). A. Bharati, ed., pp. 371–81. The Hague: Mouton.
- Distribution of the Mesa in Latin America by Sharon, Douglas C. (1976). In Journal of Latin American Lore 2(1):75-91.
- The Magic Cactus: Ethnoarchaeological Continuity in Peru by Sharon, Douglas C. & Christopher B. Donnan (1977). In Archaeology 30 (6):374-381. New York: The Archeological Institute of American.

== See also ==
- Alana Cordy-Collins
