= Marcantonio (given name) =

Marcantonio or Marc'Antonio is a masculine Italian given name. Notable people with the name include:

- Marcantonio Amulio (1506–1572), Venetian diplomat and cardinal
- Marcantonio Barbarigo (1640–1706), Italian cardinal
- Marcantonio Barbaro (1518–1595), Italian diplomat
- Marcantonio Bellavia, 17th-century Italian painter
- Marcantonio Bobba (died 1575), Italian Roman Catholic bishop and cardinal
- Marcantonio Borghese, 5th Prince of Sulmona (1730–1800)
- Marcantonio Bragadin (disambiguation), multiple people
- Marcantonio Campeggi (died 1553), Italian Roman Catholic bishop
- Marcantonio Canini (1622–1669), Italian painter and sculptor
- Marcantonio Chiarini (c. 1652 – 1730), Italian Baroque painter
- Marcantonio Colonna (disambiguation), multiple people
- Marcantonio Dal Re (1697–1766), Italian engraver and publisher
- Marcantonio De Beaumont-Bonelli, Italian sailor
- Marcantonio della Torre (1481–1511), Italian anatomist
- Marcantonio Dordi (1598–1663), Italian painter
- Marcantonio Durando (1801–1880), Italian Roman Catholic priest
- Marcantonio Flaminio (died 1550), Italian poet
- Marcantonio Franceschini (1648–1729), Italian Baroque painter
- Marcantonio Genovesi (died 1624), Italian Roman Catholic bishop
- Marcantonio Genua (1491–1563), Italian philosopher
- Marcantonio Giustinian (1619–1688), Doge of Venice
- Marcantonio Gozzadini (1574–1623), Italian cardinal
- Marc'Antonio Ingegneri, 16th-century Italian Renaissance composer
- Marcantonio Maffei (1521–1583), Italian Roman Catholic bishop and cardinal
- Marcantonio Marcolini (1721–1782), Italian Roman Catholic bishop and cardinal
- Marc'Antonio Mazzoleni (died 1632), Italian engineer
- Marcantonio Memmo (1536–1615), Doge of Venice
- Marcantonio Michiel (1484–1552), Venetian noble
- Marcantonio Negri (died 1624), Italian composer, singer and music director
- Marc'Antonio Pasqualini (1614–1691), Italian opera singer
- Marcantonio Pellini (1659–1760), Italian painter
- Marcantonio Raimondi, 16th-century Italian engraver
- Marcantonio Riverditi (died 1744), Italian Baroque painter
- Marcantonio Trivisan, Doge of Venice
- Marc'Antonio Verità (died 1650), Roman Catholic bishop
- Marc'Antonio Ziani (c. 1653 – 1715), Italian composer
- Marcantonio Zimara, 16th-century Italian philosopher
- Marc'Antonio Zondadari (1658–1722), Italian noble
