= Bragadin =

Bragadin may refer to:

- Bragadin family, an old aristocratic Venetian family
- Bragadin-class submarine, submarine built for the Regia Marina
- Marco Antonio Bragadin (1523–1571), a Venetian lawyer and military officer of the Republic of Venice

== See also ==
- Bragadino
- Braga (disambiguation)
- Marcantonio Bragadin (disambiguation)
