= Dordi =

Dordi may refer to:

== People ==
- Alessandro Dordi, one of the Three Martyrs of Chimbote
- Dordi Nordby (born 1964), Norwegian curler
- Marcantonio Dordi (1598–1663), Italian painter, active in Bassano del Grappa

== Places ==
- Dordi Rural Municipality, Nepal
