= Nicoli =

Nicoli is a surname. Notable people with the surname include:

- Aldo Nicoli (born 1953), Italian footballer and manager
- Eric Nicoli (born 1950), British chief executive
- Giuseppina Nicoli (1863–1924), Italian nun
- Natela Nicoli (born 1961), Georgian opera singer
- Nicola de Nicoli, 17th-century Italian painter
- Vincenzo Nicoli (born 1958), English actor
