= Diocesan Museum of Pavia =

Diocesan museum of Pavia
- Museo diocesano di Pavia
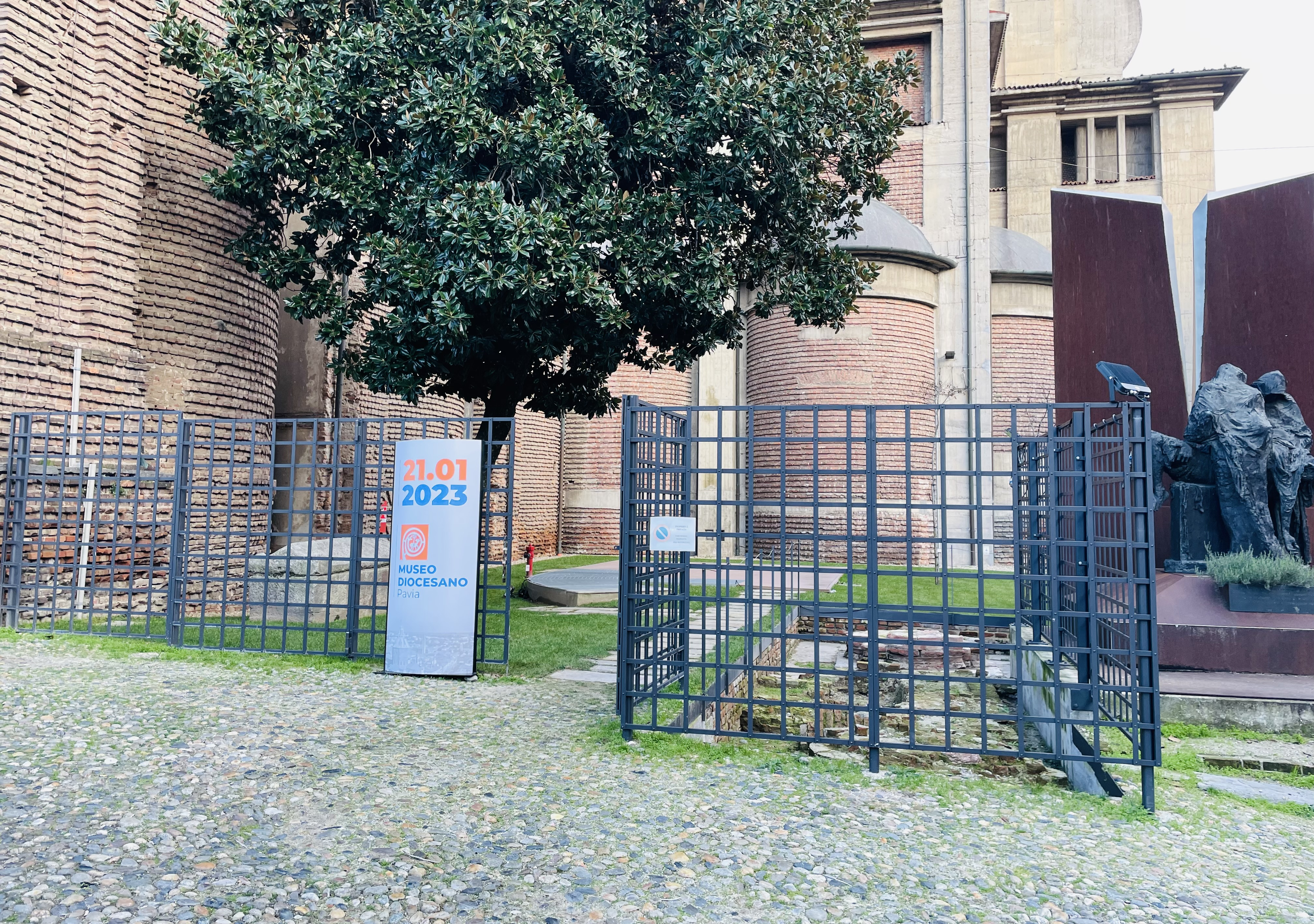
- Location: Piazza del Duomo, 27100, Pavia PV, Italy
- Coordinates: 45.1844°N 9.1528°E
- Type: Art museum and Historic site
- Public transit access: Pavia railway station
- Website: www.diocesi.pavia.it/museo-diocesano

The Diocesan Museum of Pavia was founded in 2023 on the initiative of the Diocese of Pavia with the aim of protecting, enhancing and making known the artistic treasures of the diocese within the spiritual context that inspired them.

== Site ==
The diocesan museum of Pavia represents an evocative place with a dual soul, because it is aimed on the one hand at the faithful to whom it offers evidence of the birth of a religious community starting from its roots, on the other at visitors interested in the historical-artistic and architectural elements present in it. The museum is located inside the remains of the crypt of Santa Maria del Popolo, one of the two ancient Romanesque cathedrals destroyed at the end of the 15th century to make way for the current cathedral.

In fact, the current Cathedral stands on the site of the two pre-existing "twin" cathedrals, united and communicating, of Santo Stefano (summer) and Santa Maria del Popolo (winter). The two original churches were founded between the 6th and 7th centuries and then rebuilt, in Romanesque style, between the 11th and 12th centuries. Santo Stefano had a façade similar to that of the basilica San Pietro in Ciel d'Oro, but with three portals, while Santa Maria del Popolo had a single portal and its façade was enriched by lines of white, green and blue glazed bricks ( partly now preserved in the Civic Museums), among the oldest Italian (and European) examples of majolica.

Santo Stefano consisted of five naves with rib vaults, unlike Santa Maria del Popolo which only had three. The two cathedrals were progressively deconsecrated and demolished as the construction site of the Duomo progressed, so much so that of the two churches only a section of the lateral wall of Santo Stefano along via Omodeo and part of the crypt of Santa Maria del Popolo survive, which, restored in 2004, now houses the diocesan museum.

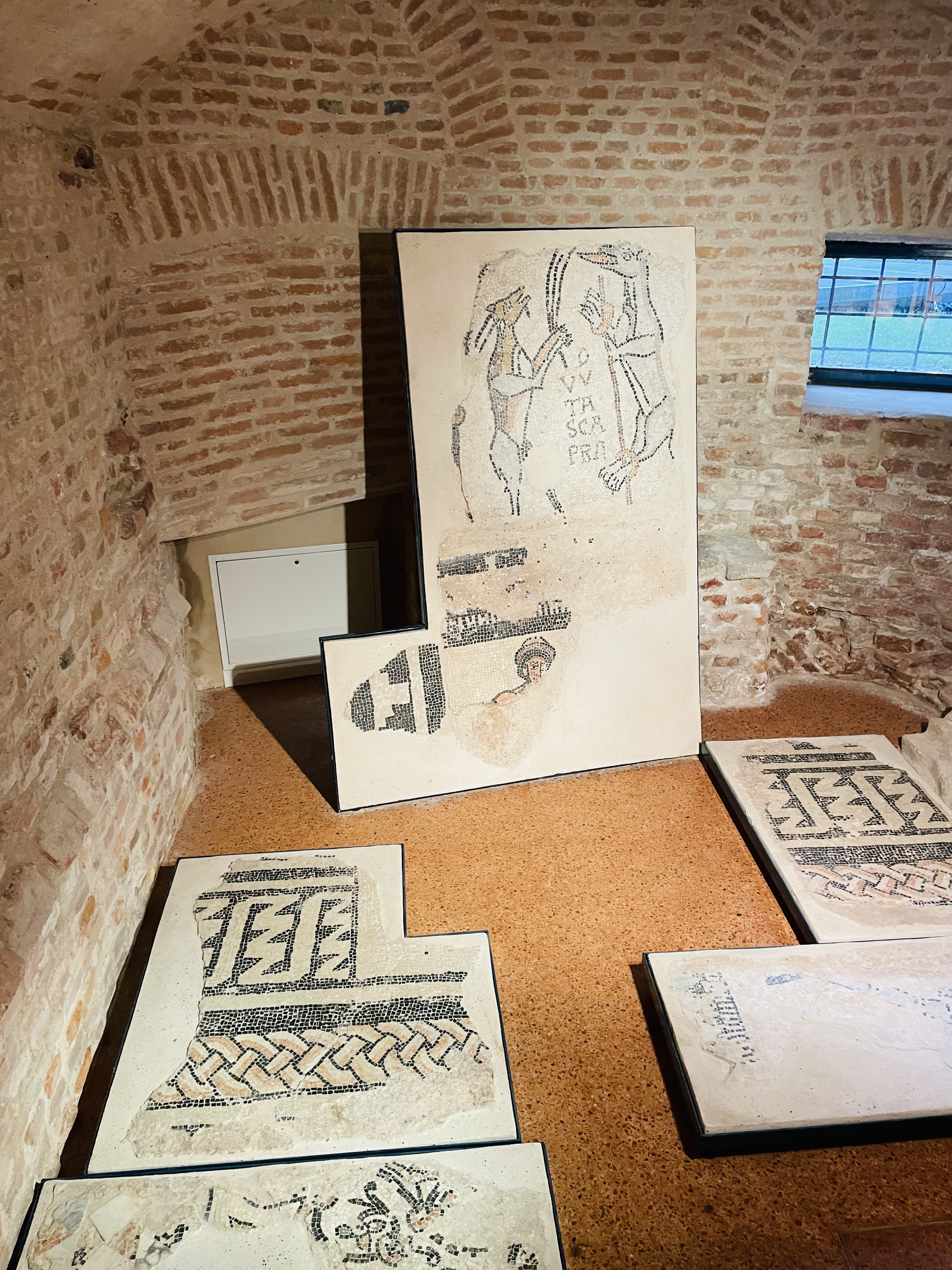
Fragments of the floor mosaics of the two Romanesque cathedrals (XI-XII century).

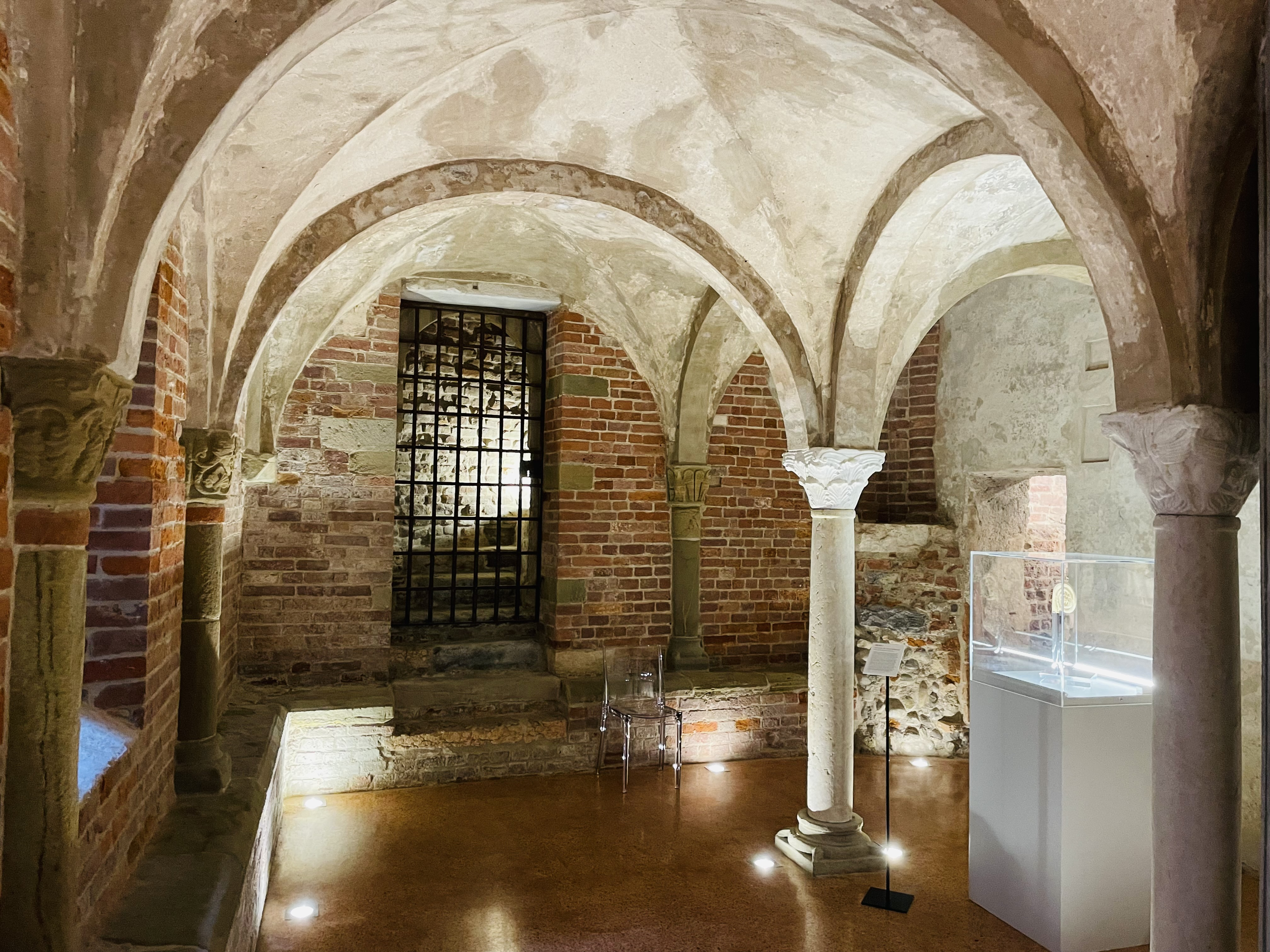
Crypt of Santa Maria del Popolo (first half of the 11th century).

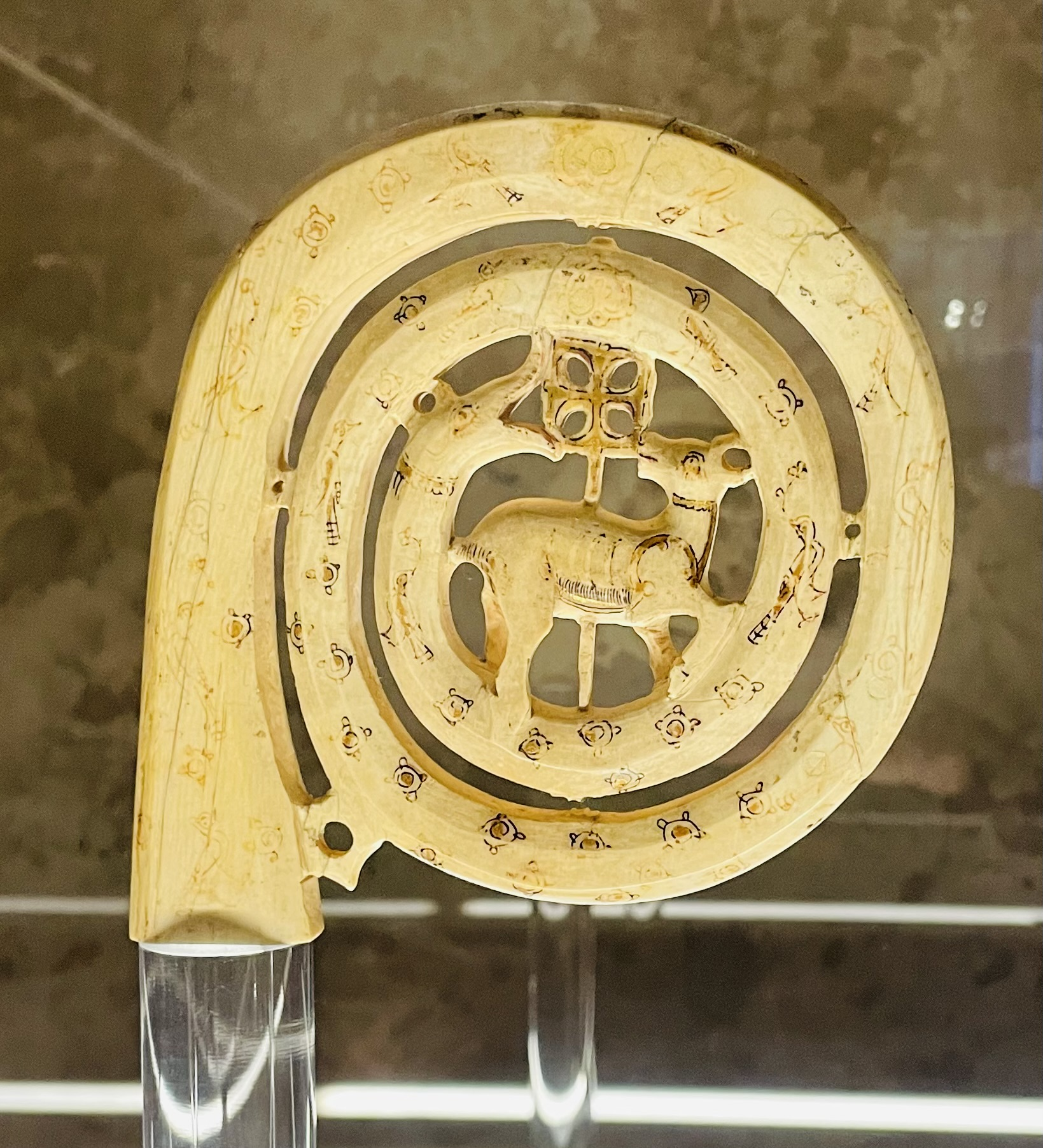
Sicilian-Arab master, crosier, ivory (12th century).

== Description ==
At the entrance to the museum there is a granite sarcophagus with a gabled lid from the late Roman period. The museum itinerary continues inside the underground rooms that made up the primitive crypt also illuminated by two round openings in the pavement of the Cathedral, two oculi that allow you to contemplate the luminosity of the great Renaissance dome.

Some niches added in the 15th century to the walls of the crypt house portions of the floor mosaics (11th-12th century) of the medieval double cathedral found during the restoration works. Precious are the objects exhibited in the museum itinerary, among them a crosier in carved, painted and gilded elephantine ivory made by a Sicilian workshop by the hand of Arab craftsmen and dating back to the end of the 12th century. It depicts the coil of the ancient serpent defeated by the Lamb, Christ, by means of the Cross. The work, which belonged to the bishop of Pavia Pietro Grassi in the Middle Ages, belongs to a series of ivory artefacts spread throughout Europe and executed in Sicily in the 12th century by Arab artists who worked in the entourage of the court of Roger II and his successors.

Some sculptures with a religious theme are also on display, including a Madonna and Child in painted terracotta, from the church of Santi Primo e Feliciano and the work of an anonymous Lombard master active between the end of the 16th and the beginning of the 17th century, silverware, including some that belonged to Bishop Fabrizio Landriani (1617-1642) and a large illuminated parchment choir dating back to the last decades of the 15th century.

In the central hall of the museum there is the large panel, which was originally the crown of a polyptych now lost, by Lorenzo Fasolo depicting the Madonna della Misericordia who welcomes the members of the Disciplini Bianchi brotherhood under her cloak, a work executed between the first and second decade of the 16th century and coming from the church of Santi Giacomo e Filippo.

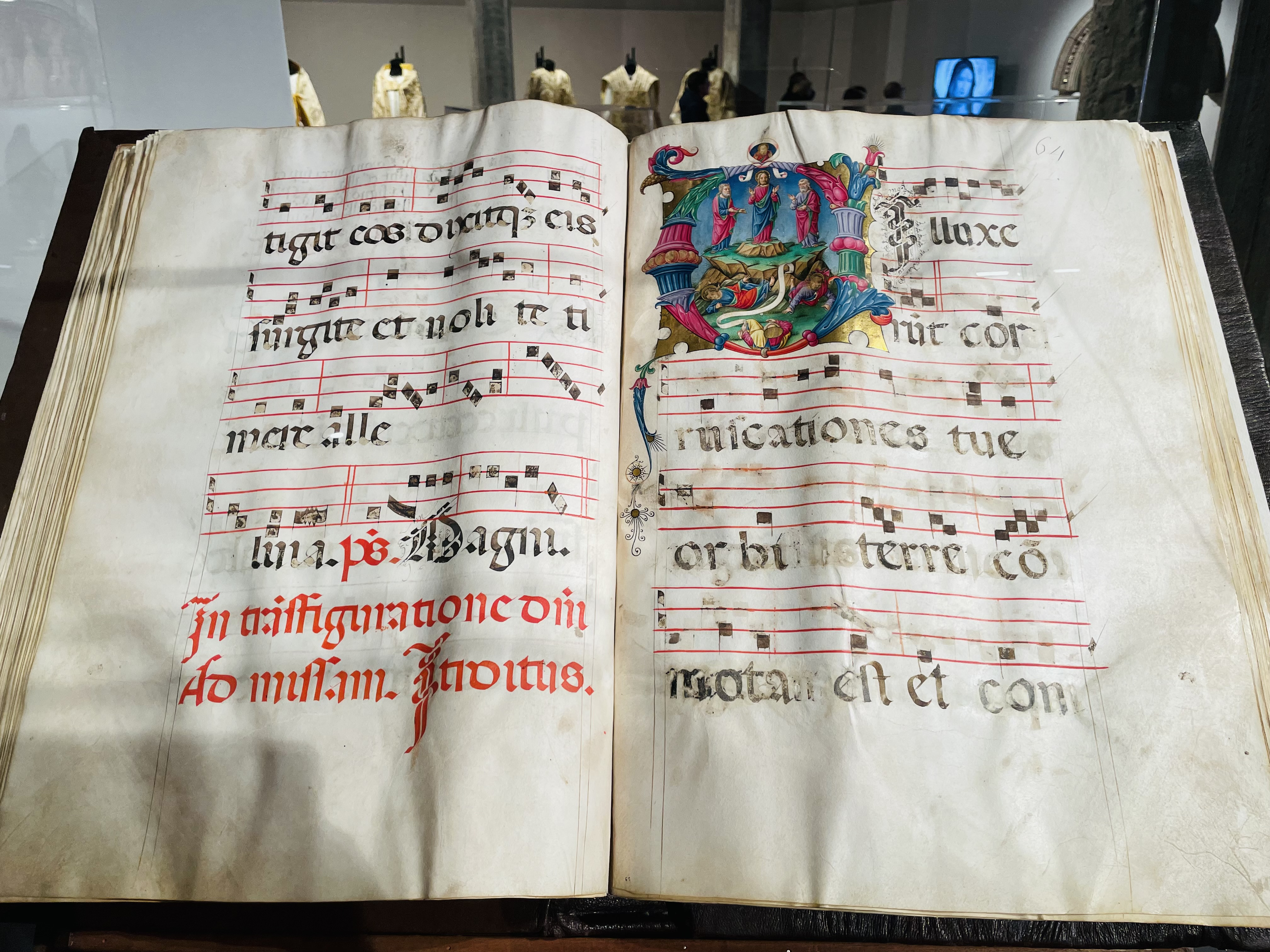
Lombard master, Choirbook, 1480-1490.

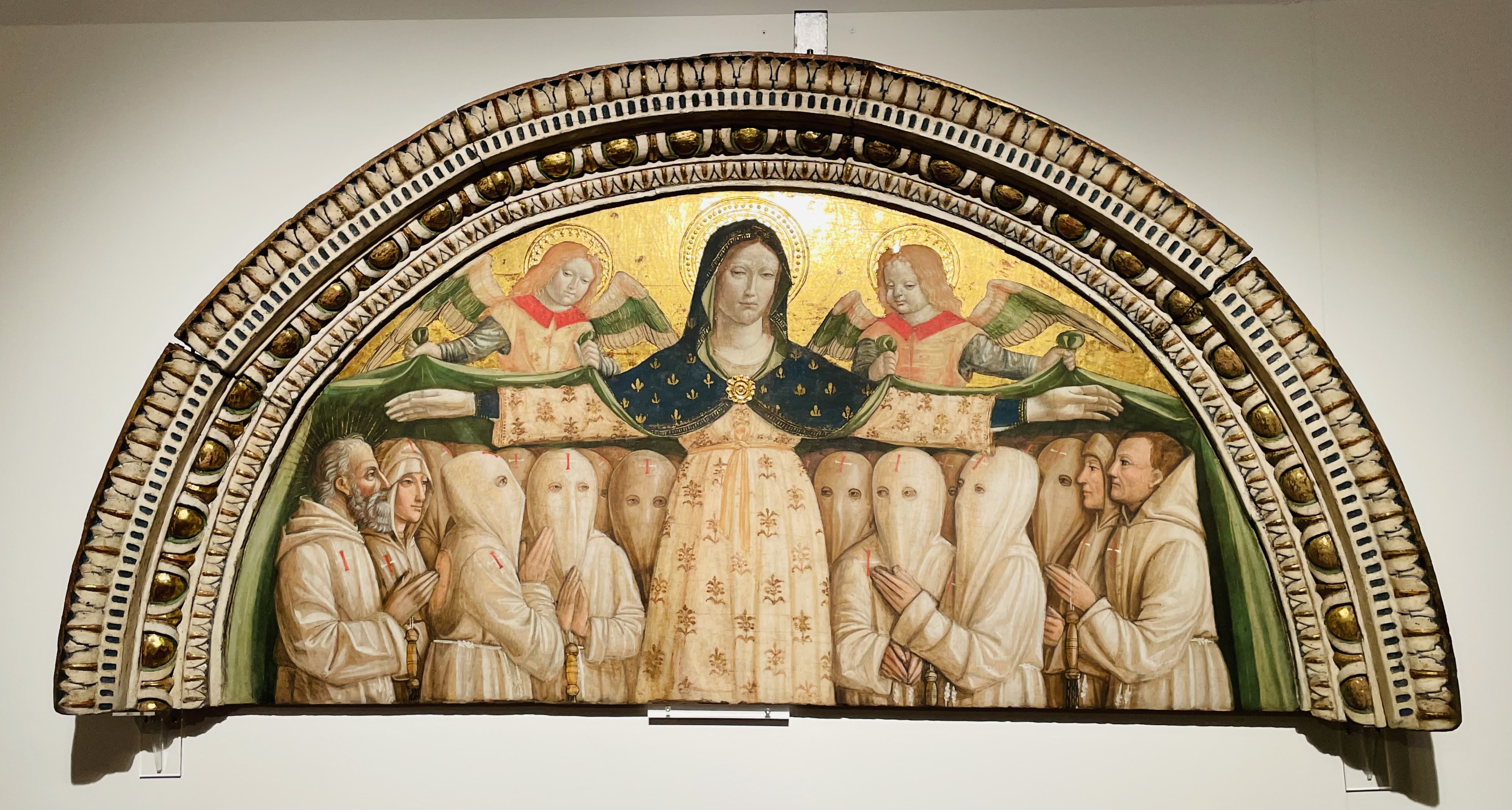
Lorenzo Fasolo, Our Lady of Mercy.

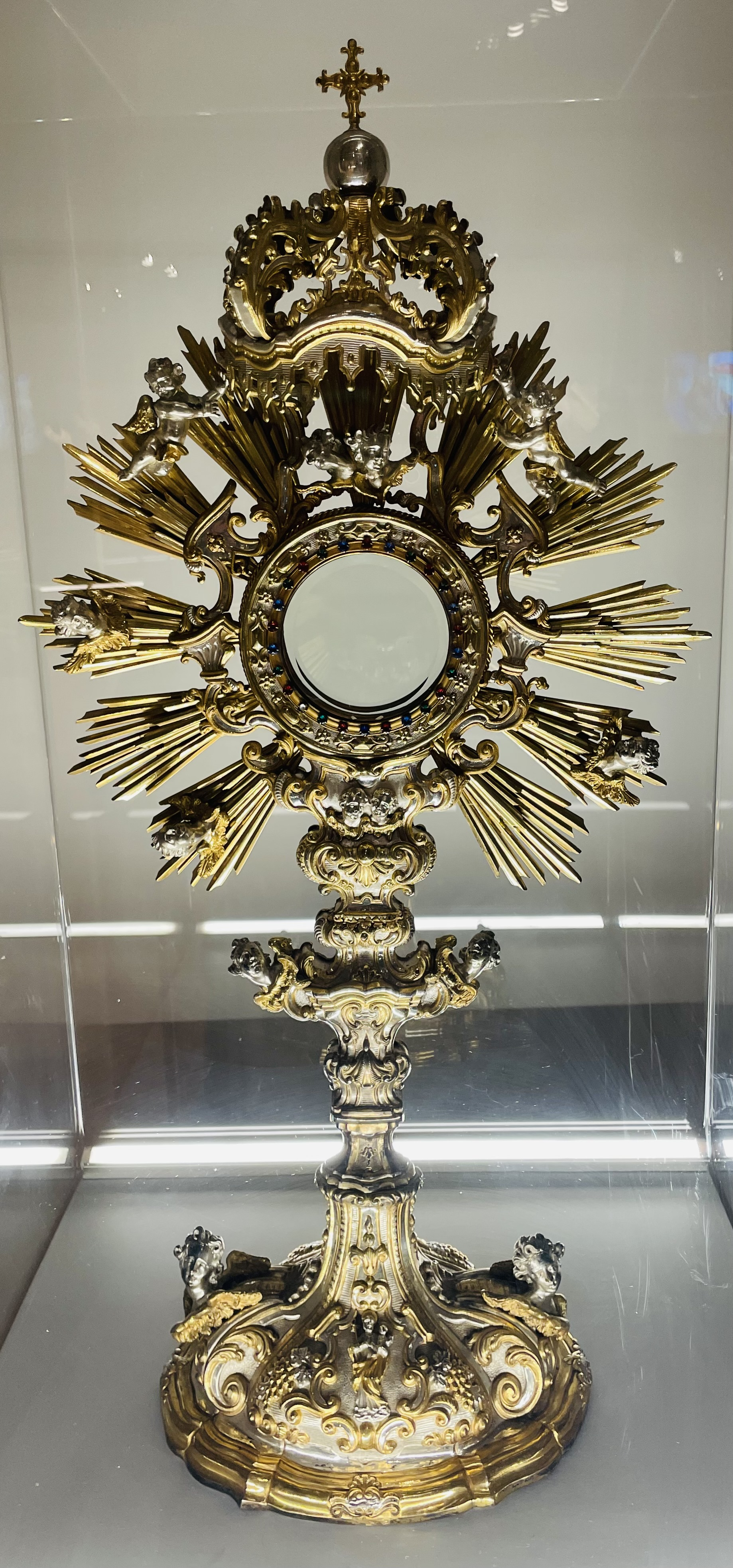
Monstrance, Lombard area (18th century).
