= Catholic University Los Angeles of Chimbote =

Private University in Peru

Coordinates: 9.0771°S 78.5913°W

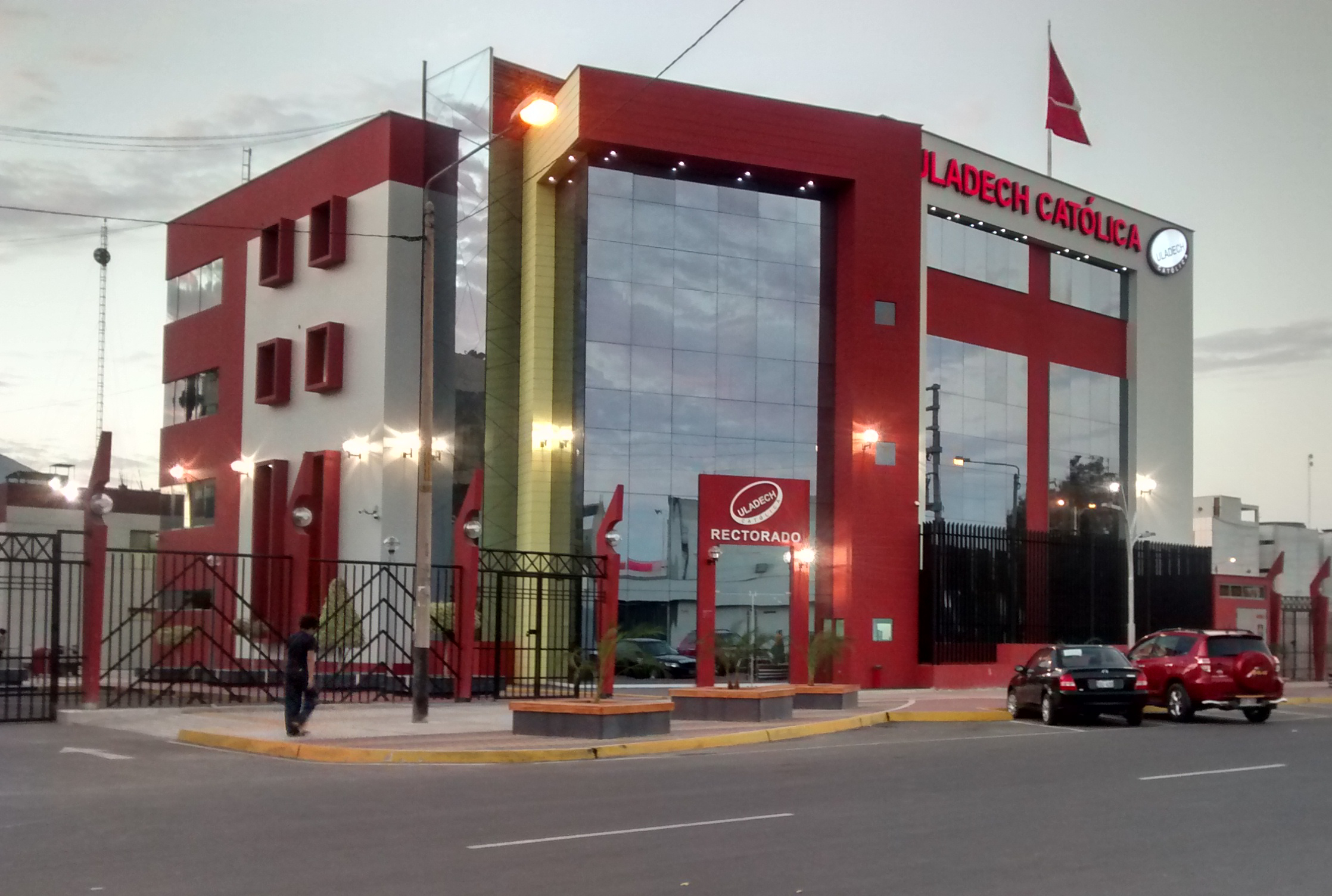
New Rectorate premises of the Catholic University of Los Angeles of Chimbote

Catholic University Los Angeles of Chimbote (Universidad Católica Los Ángeles de Chimbote; Uladech Católica or Uladech) is a Catholic university in Chimbote, Peru. The university's rector as of 2013 is Ing. Dr. Julio B. Domínguez Granda.

The university opened in 1985. Law No. 24163 established the university.
