= SIDERPERU =

Empresa Siderúrgica del Perú S.A.A.
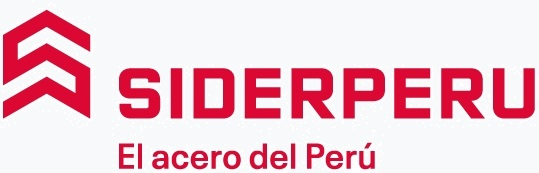
- Company type: Public
- Traded as: SIDERC1
- Industry: Siderurgy
- Founded: 1956
- Headquarters: Chimbote, Peru
- Key people: Juan Pablo Garcia Bayce (CEO)
- Products: Steel & Iron
- Revenue: ▲US$ 543.2 Million (2008)
- Number of employees: 2,500
- Parent: Gerdau
- Website: https://www.siderperu.com.pe

SIDERPERU is a Peruvian steel and iron company and controlled by Gerdau, a Brazilian siderurgy company.

The company was founded in 1956 in Chimbote city. The steel complex is set in a 600 hectares large site and has a production capacity of more than 500 tons of steel products. It includes a blast furnace, the only one in Peru, and several electric arc furnaces that produce steel sponges. Since its foundation the company is the largest in its sector in Peru.

== See also ==
- Chimbote
