= Giacomo Apollonio =

Italian painter

Giacomo Apollonio (1584 in Bassano – 1 December 1654 in Bassano) was an Italian painter of the late-Renaissance and early-Baroque periods.

Born to a daughter of Jacopo Bassano, and trained with his uncles Gerolamo and Giovanni Battista (del Ponte) Bassano. The church of Santa Eulalia in Borso del Grappa has an Apollonio painting of Christ ascending above Saints Giustina, John the Evangelist, and Prosdocimus. For the Sanctuary of the Madonna delle Grazie in Cordovado, he painted two lunettes over doors, depicting Adoration by the Shepherds and Adoration by the Magi.

Giacomo trained the painters Nicola de' Nicoli and Marcantonio Dordi. His nephew Marcantonio Apollonio (died 1729) is described as a mediocre painter.
