= Huallanca District, Huaylas =

Coordinates: 7.2906°S 76.196102°W

Huallanca Wallanka
- District
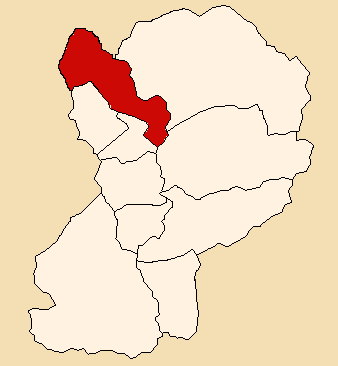
- Location of Huallanca in the Huaylas province
- Country: Peru
- Region: Ancash
- Province: Huaylas
- Founded: April 14, 1950
- Capital: Huallanca

Area
  - Total: 178.8 km^{2} (69.0 sq mi)
- Elevation: 1,377 m (4,518 ft)

Population (2005 census)
  - Total: 985
  - Density: 5.51/km^{2} (14.3/sq mi)
- Time zone: UTC-5 (PET)
- UBIGEO: 021202
- Website: munihuallanca.gob.pe

The Huallanca District (hispanicized spelling) or Wallanka (Quechua for "mountain range") is the most northeastern of the 10 districts that comprise Huaylas Province in the Ancash Region (formerly "Departmento de Ancash") of Peru. It is in the high mountain range known as Cordillera Negra ("Black Range"). The district capital is Huallanca. The district was founded in 1950 by separating it from the Huaylas District.

== Railroad construction ==
At the height of regional mining production in 1860, the national and local governments sought to facilitate exports from mines in the Callejón de Huaylas (the grand valley "Alley of Huaylas") through the port of Chimbote. This initiative included the construction of a 29 km railroad between Chimbote and Huallanca, an extension of the proposed Chimbote-Chuquicara-Recuay railway. The project was approved by law on 8 November 1864. Construction was entrusted to Ing. Enrrique Meiggs during the administration of Peruvian president José Balta, and began on 9 June 1871.

The work was done in three stages, the first of which was from Chimbote to Planks, inaugurated in 1877. The second stage, from Planks to Chuquicara, was inaugurated in 1892 by means of a contract with the Peruvian Pacific Railway. In 1920 the third stage, from Chuquicara to Huallanca, was begun. Overall length of the rail line from Chimbote to Huallanca was 137 km. Later a planned 13.5 km extension advanced on a roadbed constructed without sleepers or rails.
