= Chimbote =

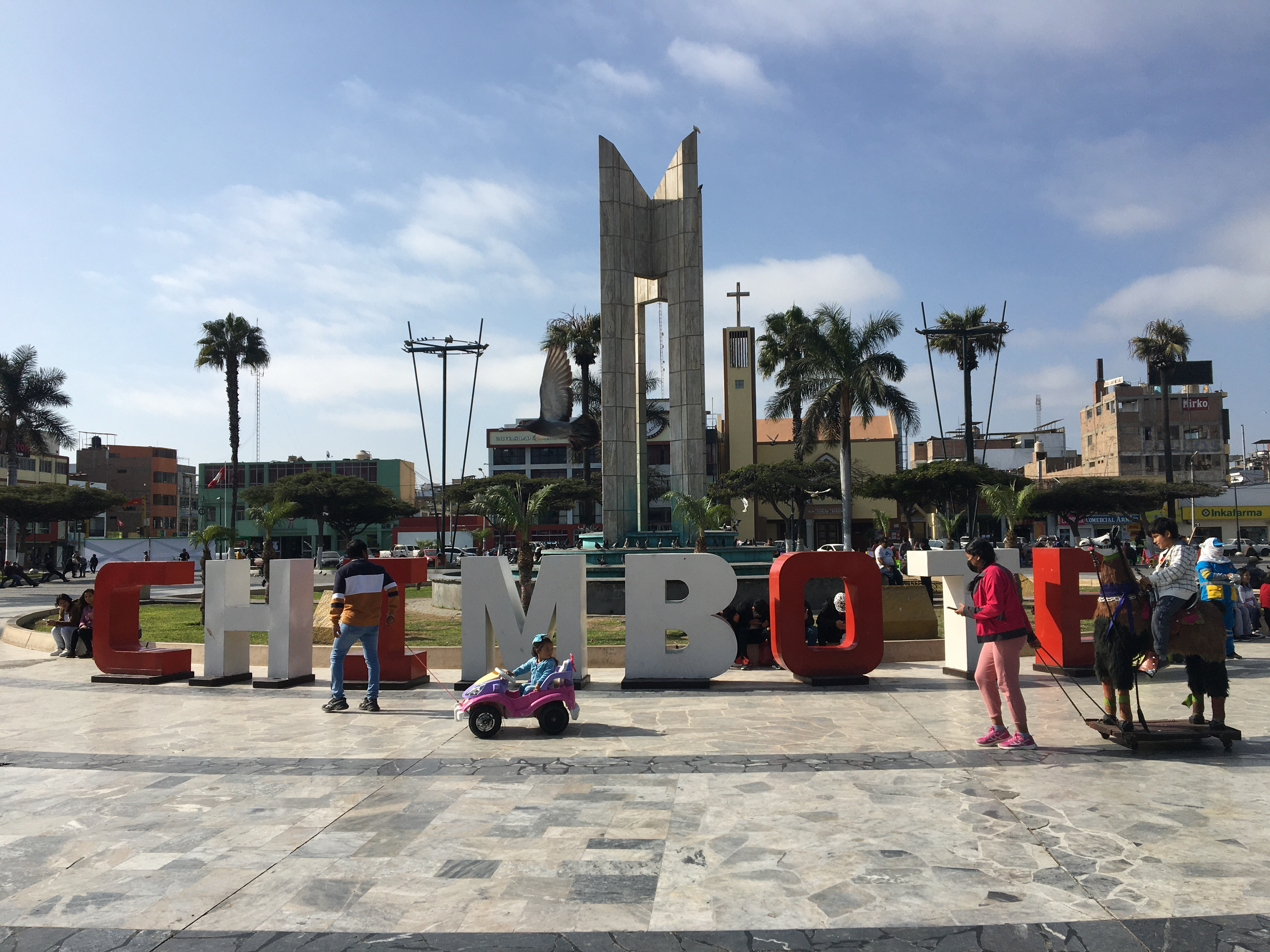
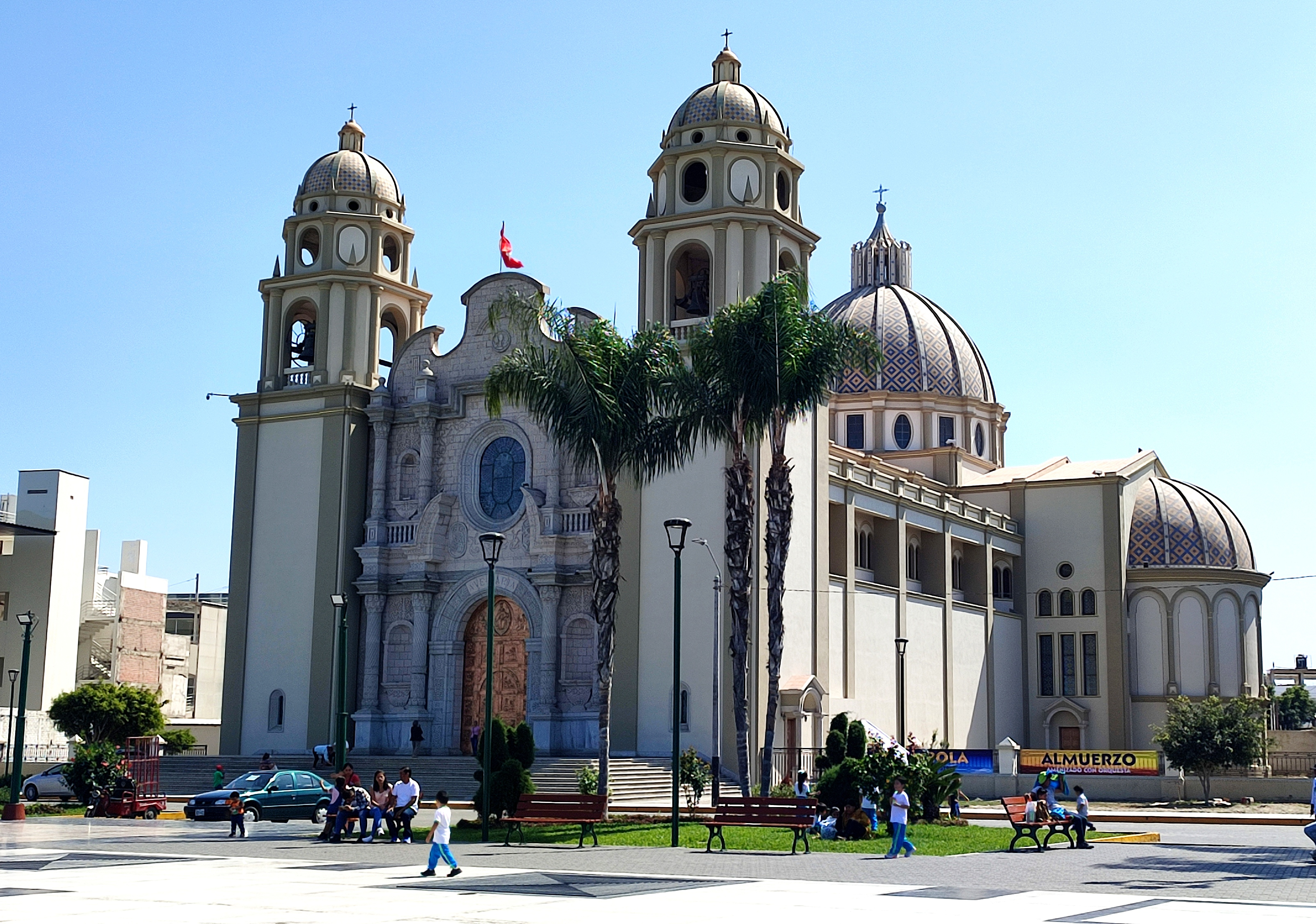
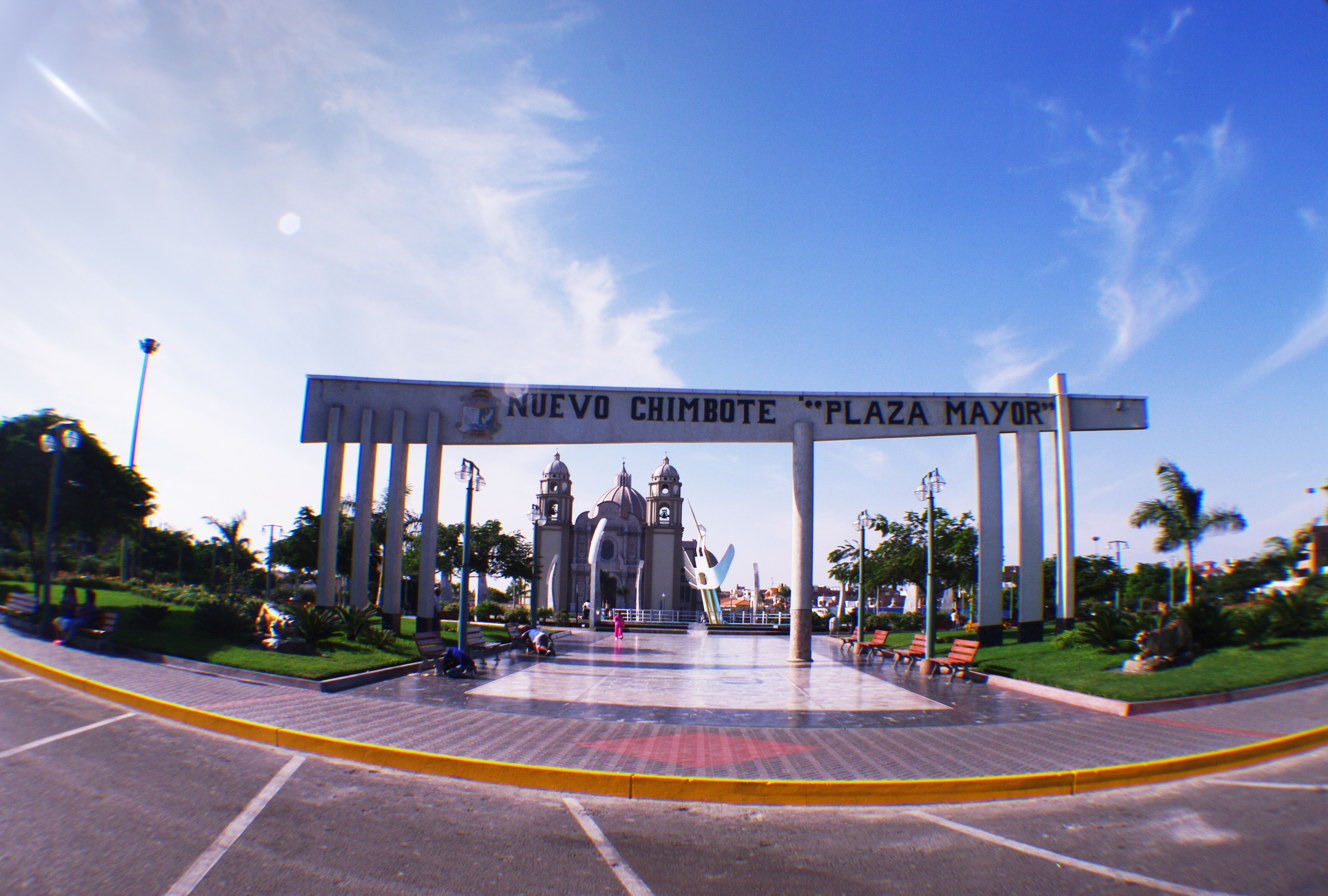
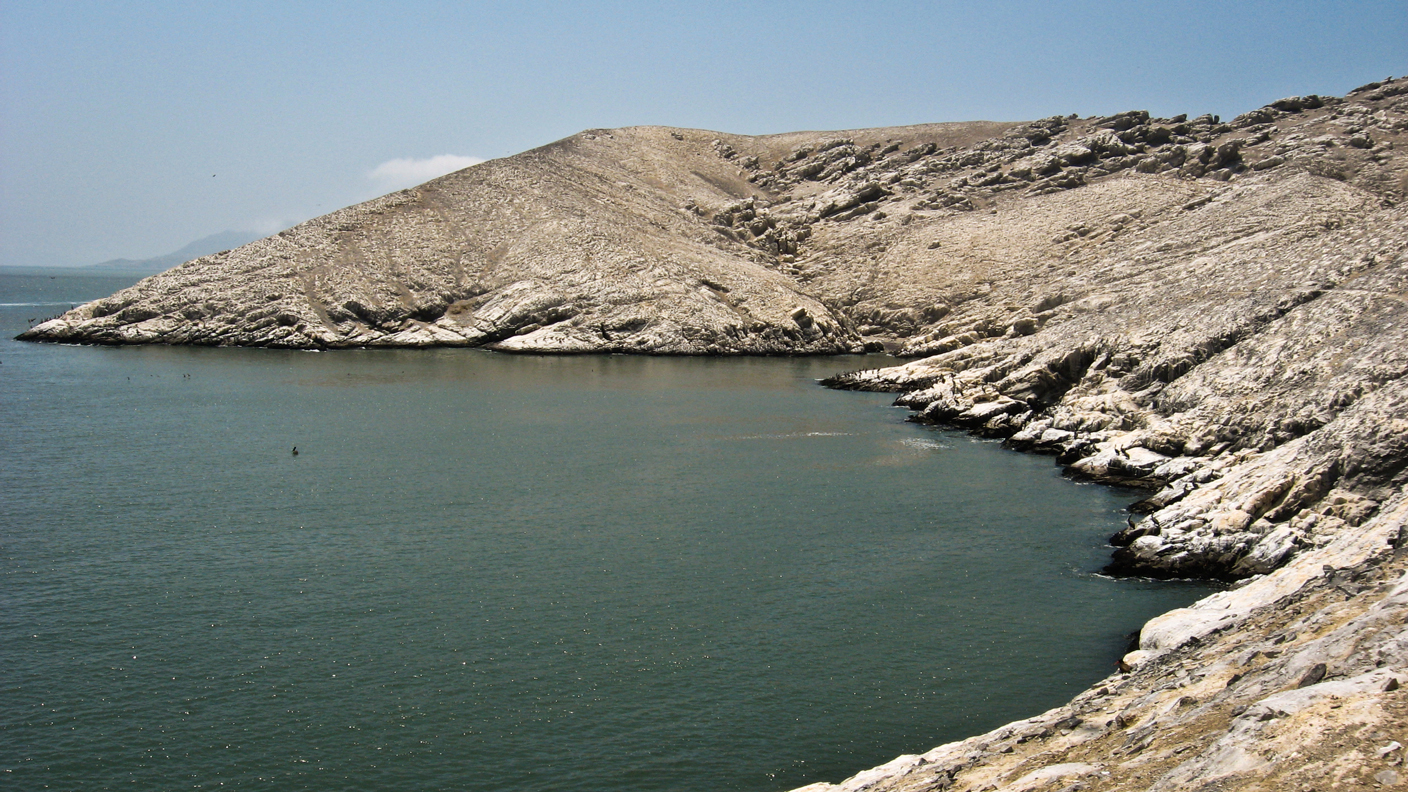
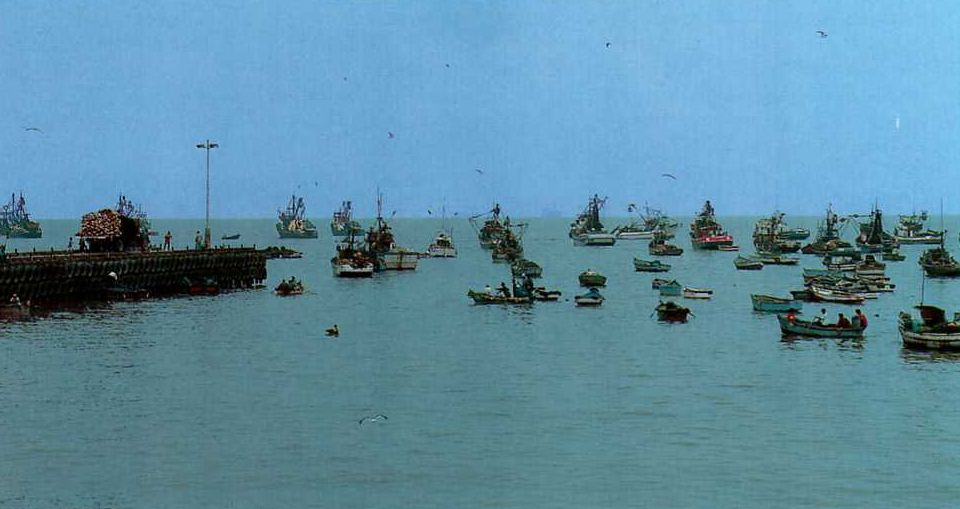
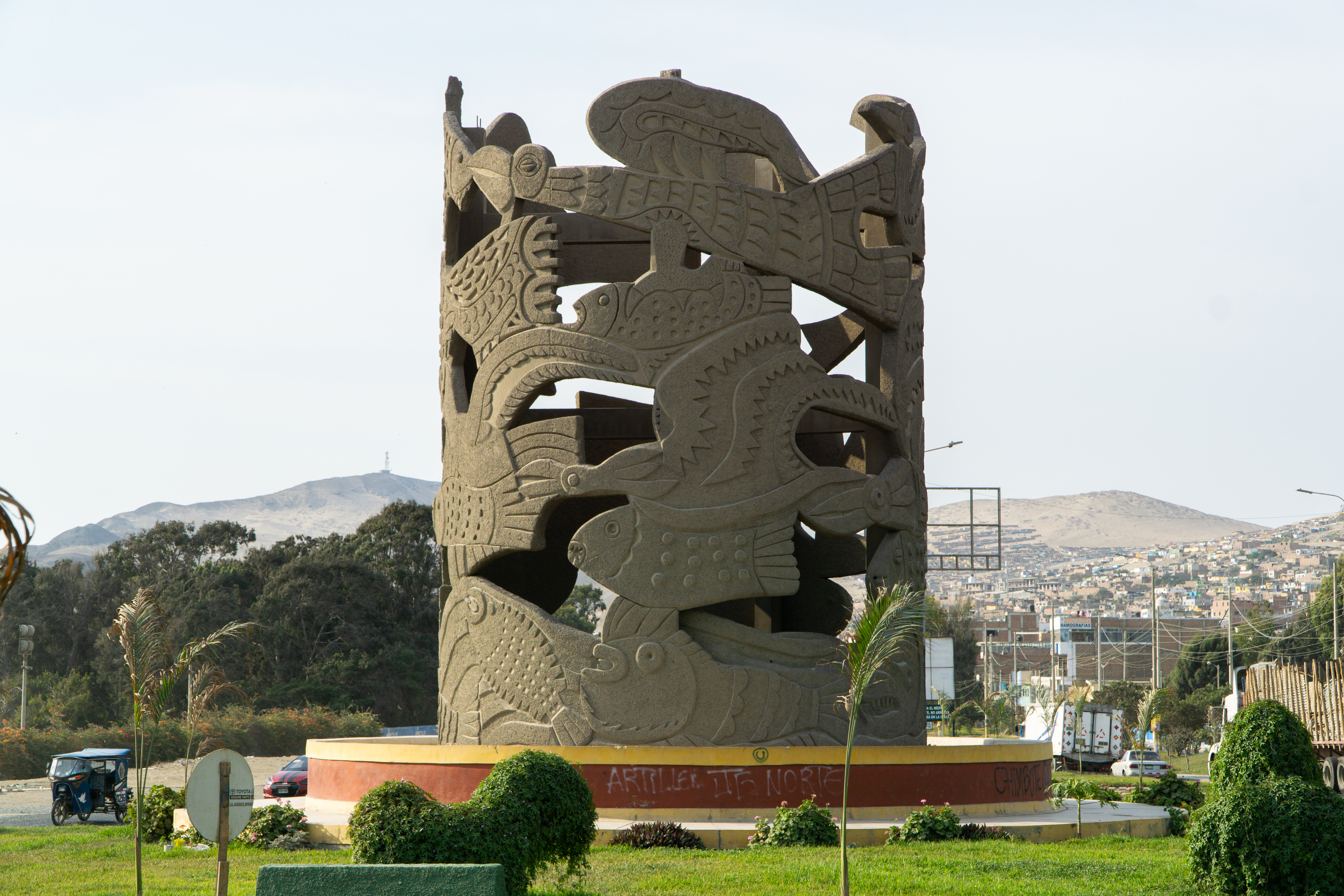
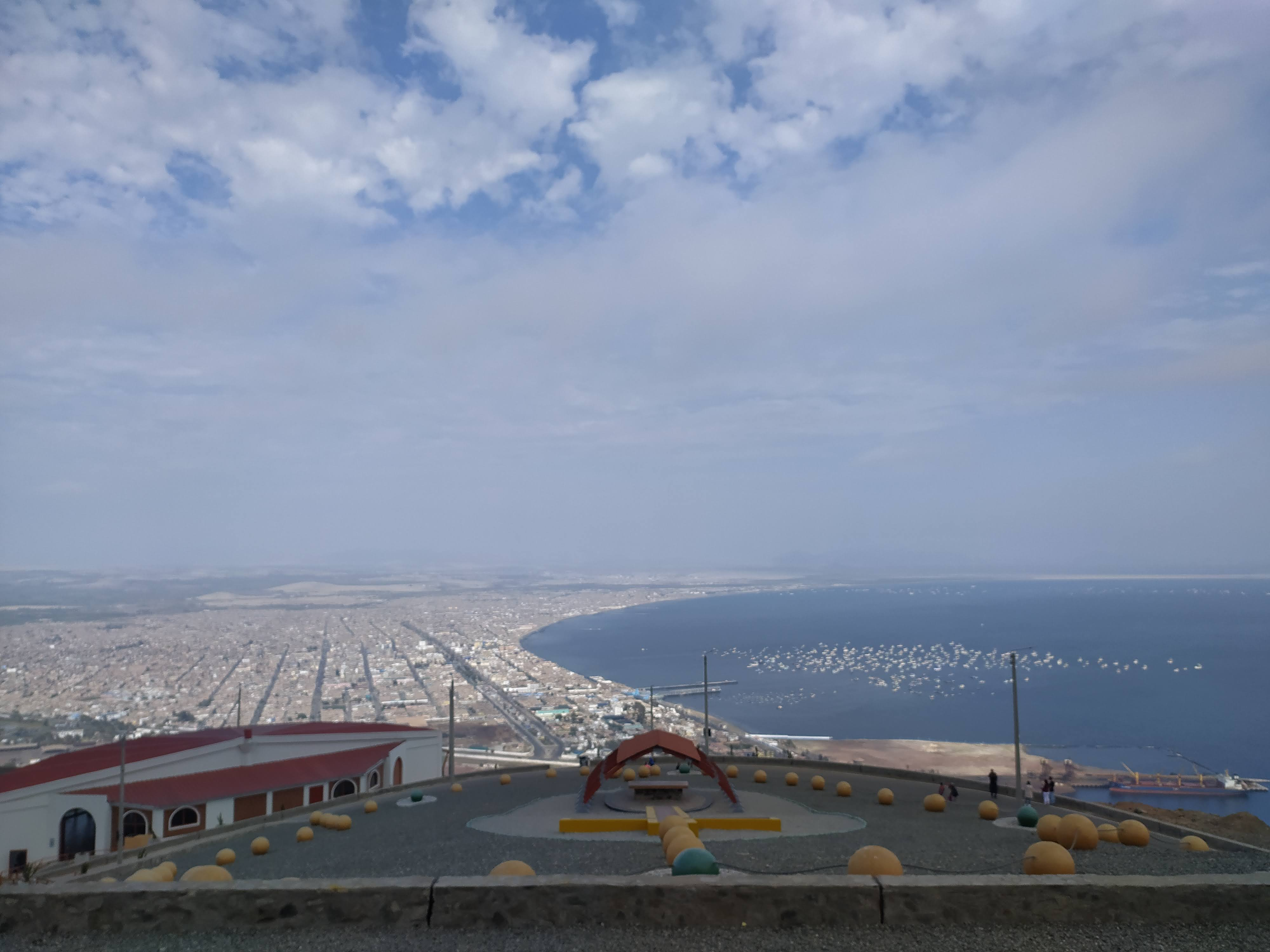
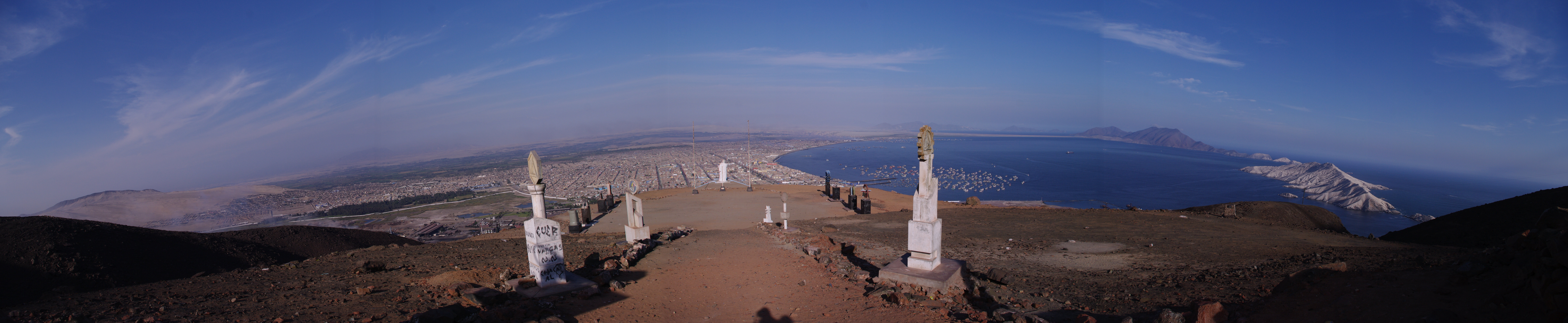

- Flag Seal
- Nickname: "The capital of fishing and steel"
- Location within Peru
- Coordinates: 9°8′28.36″S 78°35′36.86″W
- Country: Peru
- Region: Ancash
- Province: Santa
- Founded: 6 December 1906

Government
  - Mayor: Roberto Briceño Franco (2019-2022)
- Elevation: 4 m (13 ft)

Population
  - Estimate (2015): 371,012
  - Density: 3,019/km^{2} (7,820/sq mi)
- Time zone: UTC-5
- Area code: 43
- Website: www.munisanta.gob.pe

Chimbote [tʃimˈbote]; Quechua: Chimputi) is a city in northwestern Peru. It is the largest city in the Ancash Region and the tenth most populous in Peru. With a population of 425,367 in 2017, it is the capital of both Santa Province and Chimbote District. The city has an altitude of 4 meters.

The city is located on the coast in Ferrol Bay, 130 km south of Trujillo and 420 kilometers (260 mi) north of Lima on the North Pan-American highway. It is the start of a chain of important cities on the Peruvian north coast like Trujillo, Chiclayo and Piura. The advantages of this geographic location made Chimbote into a transshipment junction for the Santa River valley. The city is the second most important port city after Callao.

== Etymology ==
In the book Chimbote Through History (1969), José Gutiérrez and Demetrio Ramos refer to the verb chimbar, a Quechuan word, without delving into the etymology. According to the American linguist Gary Parker (1976), tsimpay means "to cross a river" in Ancashino Quechua, and the voicing of /p/ in the vicinity of /-m/ in syllabic coda position is known for Quechua, but remains in the transformation of /a/ into "o", anomalous, like the same addition of -te, as for Guardia's report.

== History ==
=== Pre-Columbian era ===
The territory in which Chimbote is currently located has been successively populated by the Recuay, Moche, Wari, Chimor and Inca cultures. The archaeological centers of Huaca San Pedro, El Castillo, among others, testify to this. It is thought that the same ethnic group populated these lands, the Maya, but the aborigines were later dispersed and decimated when the Conquest of America occurred.

=== Colonial era ===
It is in the book Introduction and description of the provinces belonging to the Archbishopric of Lima of 1774, written by Cosme Bueno, that the name of Chimbote appears for the first time in an official document. The reference tells [...] that the old Villa de Santa María de la Parrilla (Santa), has a small fishing village called Chimbote attached to it. Ethnography refers to these first settlers as fishermen from the resort of Huanchaco, west of Trujillo, which is why they were called huanchaqueros.

=== Republican era ===
In 1835, when General Santa Cruz granted Chimbote's first official acknowledgement, Chimbote was a village of fishermen with a population of no more than 800. During the Lynch expedition, an episode of the War of the Pacific, Chimbote was occupied by the Chilean Army, the Cambio Puente hacienda. As in the other occupations, the owner, Dionisio Derteano, was required to pay a fee so that the looting would not take place, but this was impossible, because in addition to demanding a very high amount, the Peruvian State closed the banks in order to avoid these quotas. Consequently, the enemy looted and destroyed the harvest, the mill and everything in it.

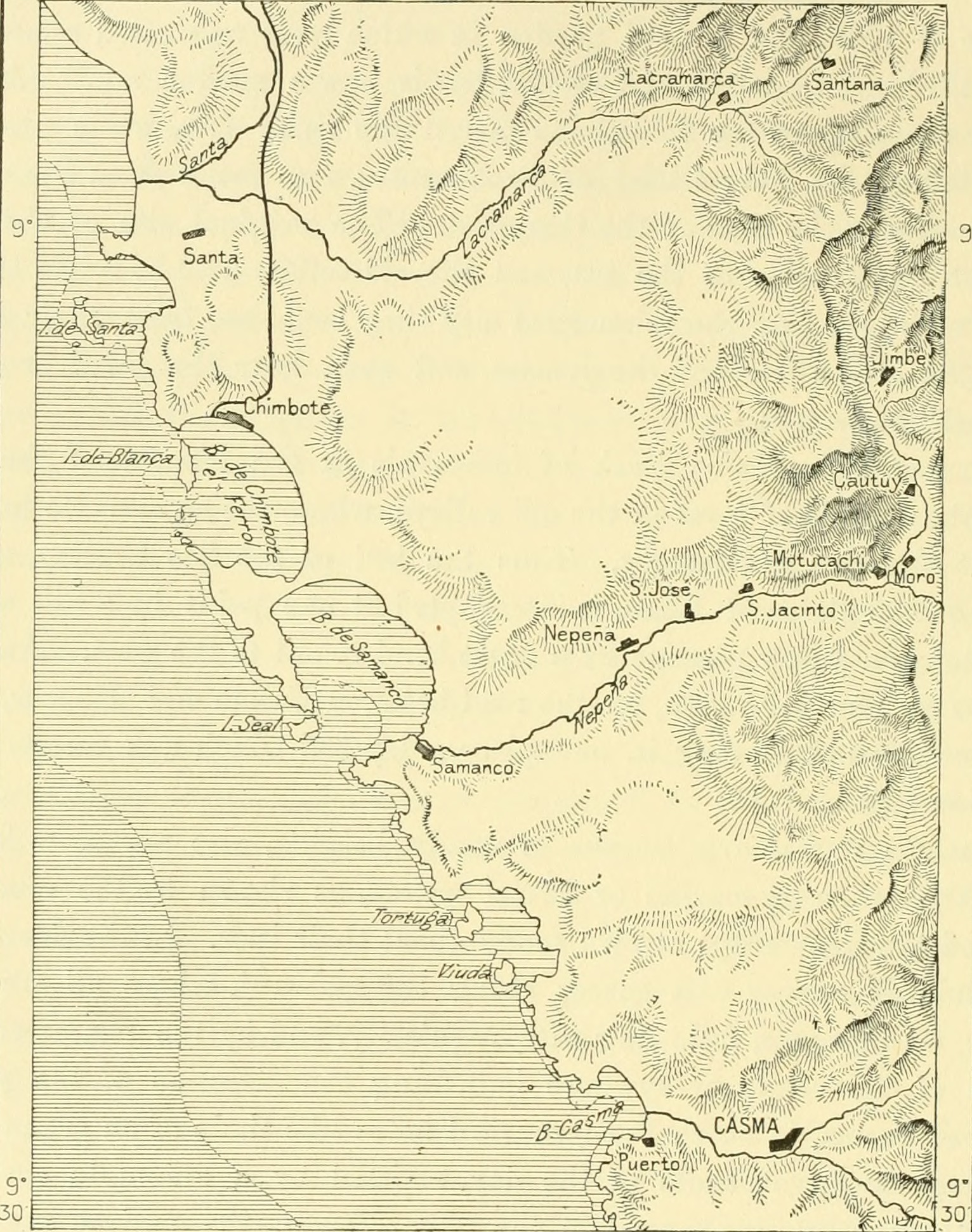
A map of the Ancash Region in 1894

In 1871, an agreement was made with Henry Meiggs to build a railroad towards the interior of the country. Chimbote was classified as a port, even though its population remained around 1,000. The opening of the Pan-American Highway created easy access to Lima in the 1930s. In 1881, there was an attempt to cede a naval base to the U.S. in Chimbote Bay by Peru. The deal was blocked by Chile who sent its marines to occupy Chimbote after learning of the deal to cede a naval base to the U.S. Navy.

In 1940, Chimbote was still a small fishing port, with only 2,400 inhabitants in an urbanized area of 80 hectares (0.80 km^{2}; 0.31 sq mi). In 1943, the government created the Corporación Peruana del Santa (Peruvian Corporation of Santa). This entity assumed ownership of the railroad, made improvements to the port, and began work on a hydroelectric power station on the Río Santa (in the Cañón del Pato [Duck Canyon] in Huallanca). The first stage of the power station was inaugurated in 1958; also that year, an iron and steel plant was built. (Note: The iron and steel plant is currently known as Empresa Siderúrgica del Perú S.A.A.) By 1943, the first companies dedicated to the extraction of liver from the Pacific bonito fish arrived. This liver was sold for a high price abroad due to World War II.

In the 1950s, port activity was consolidated with the constitution of the Peruvian Corporation of Santa, the construction of the Cañón de Pato hydroelectric plant and the beginning of steel activities. Around that time there were already some fish processing plants on the outskirts of the city. However, it was only in the 1960s that massive exploitation began, largely at the initiative of Luis Banchero Rossi, beginning the disorderly migratory exodus due to the high demand for labor. This growth also implied the arrival of services that made the growth of the city chaotic and disproportionate to plans.

The following decade would see the decline of the economy due to two factors: overfishing and environmental pollution, a product of the industry that depleted the schools of the coast, and climatic factors such as the El Niño phenomenon. Also in the year 1970, the bitter 1970 Ancash earthquake occurred, which reduced much of the city's infrastructure and real estate to rubble displacing many people, not counting the numerous deaths in Chimbote and the rest of the department; A big problem was already coming to Chimbote. Many people left Chimbote and moved to the nearby Nuevo Chimbote.

=== Recent ===
The last few decades have been one of reorganization and ordering in process for Chimbote. After the collapse of the fishing industry and a new strong El Niño around 1983, interests were turned to agribusiness, tourism and commerce. In recent years, efforts have been made to recover the bay and remodel several buildings and public places.

In August 1991, in words of Pope Leo XIV, three Catholic missionaries "were murdered out of hatred of the faith."

== Geography ==
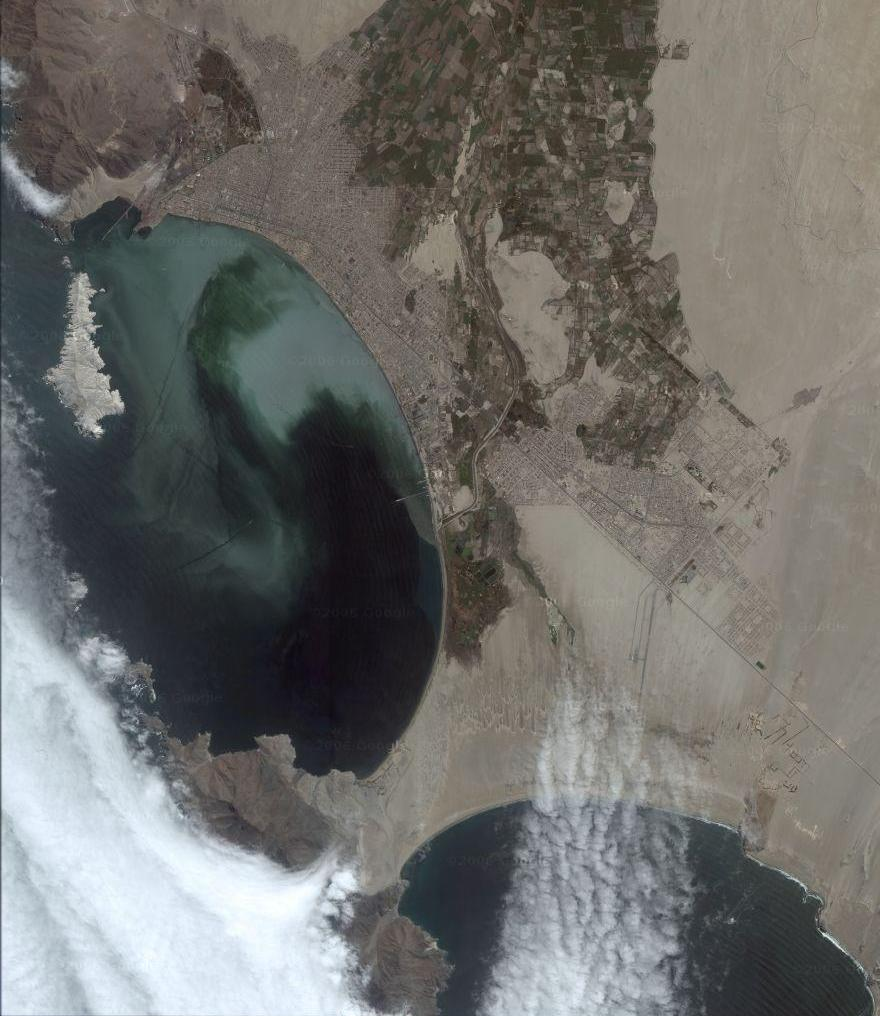
Satellite image of Chimbote

=== Location ===
The city is located on the north-central coast of Peru, at the northwestern end of the Department of Ancash, on the northeast coast of Chimbote Bay. It is bordered to the north by Cerro de la Juventud and the dunes and other elevations, and to the east by the countryside and wetlands irrigated by the Lacramarca River.

=== Climate ===
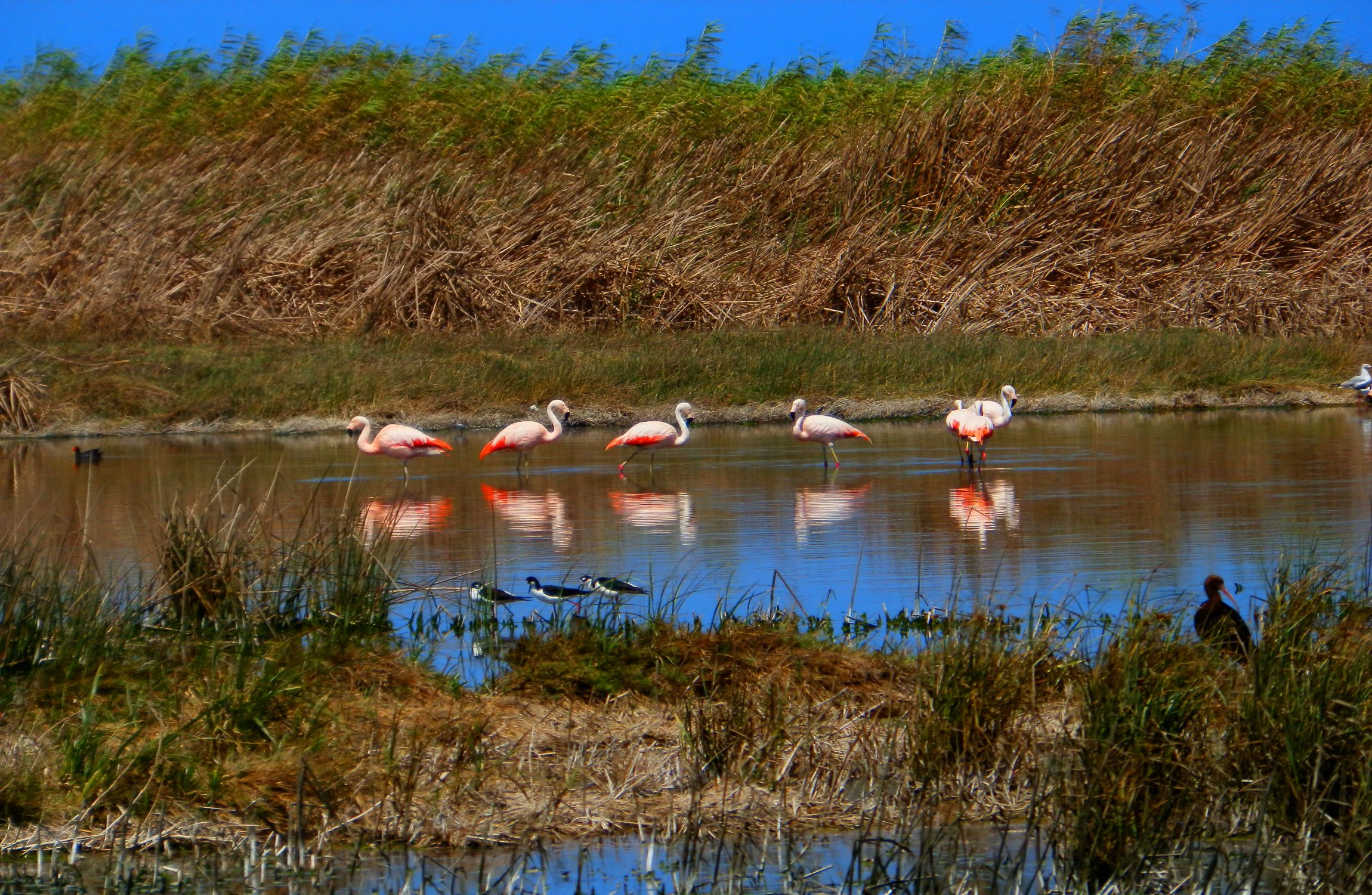
Andean flamingos in Chimbote

Chimbote's climate is comfortable, despite being located in the tropics and in a desert. Although classified as subtropical, Chimbote's proximity to the cool Humboldt current leads to temperatures much cooler than those expected for a tropical desert, and is classified as a desert climate. On average, the warmest month is February with temperatures a little over 26 °C (79 °F). September is considered the average coolest month, at around 13 °C (55 °F). The annual average temperature is around 20 °C (68 °F).

From the city of Chimbote, on particularly clear days (between May and November), you can see the snow-capped mountains of Huascarán (in the Cordillera Blanca) to the east, across the Pamparomás Pass, and Coñocranra (in the Cordillera Negra) to the northeast. Both mountains are the highest in their respective mountain ranges. Huascarán is the highest point in Peru.

The city gets little to no precipitation; however, thick fog predominates through the months of May to November, usually overnight. Rainfall usually comes in February.

Climate data for Chimbote (1961–1990)
Month	Jan	Feb	Mar	Apr	May	Jun	Jul	Aug	Sep	Oct	Nov	Dec	Year
Mean daily maximum °C (°F)	26.7 (80.1)	27.8 (82.0)	27.4 (81.3)	25.5 (77.9)	23.9 (75.0)	22.8 (73.0)	21.9 (71.4)	21.5 (70.7)	21.5 (70.7)	22.4 (72.3)	23.8 (74.8)	25.3 (77.5)	24.2 (75.6)
Mean daily minimum °C (°F)	17.4 (63.3)	18.3 (64.9)	18.3 (64.9)	17.0 (62.6)	15.7 (60.3)	14.6 (58.3)	13.9 (57.0)	14.0 (57.2)	13.7 (56.7)	14.2 (57.6)	14.8 (58.6)	16.2 (61.2)	15.7 (60.3)
Average precipitation mm (inches)	1.6 (0.06)	3.7 (0.15)	3.6 (0.14)	1.6 (0.06)	0.2 (0.01)	0.0 (0.0)	0.3 (0.01)	0.2 (0.01)	0.0 (0.0)	0.2 (0.01)	0.2 (0.01)	0.3 (0.01)	11.9 (0.47)
Source: NOAA

== Population ==
A large number of people migrated to Chimbote in the early 1970s. By that time, less than 5 percent of the people from Chimbote would truly consider themselves native; between 1960 and 1970, Chimbote's population multiplied by more than a hundred times. In 1900, the population of the port was 1,400; after 1970, it was 170,000. As of 2005, its population was 324,398.

The influx of residents was closely bound to the creation of the Corporación Peruana del Santa, to the start and development of the fishing industry, and to the establishment of the iron and steel plant ("Siderperu"). Together, these multiplied the commercial and productive activities of the port. At the beginning of 1996, as Peruvian public companies were privatized, the Peruvian-Brazilian company Acerco bought Siderperu.

=== Districts and neighborhoods ===
The city of Chimbote, being a district itself, comprises 7 more districts: Santa, Coishco, Samanco, Nepeña, Macate, Moro, Cáceres del Perú, and Nuevo Chimbote. The neighborhoods of El Barrio de Acero, Barrio Bolivar, El Progreso, Laderas del norte alto and laderas del norte bajo, Miraflores Alto and Miraflores Bajo surround Chimbote.

== Economy ==
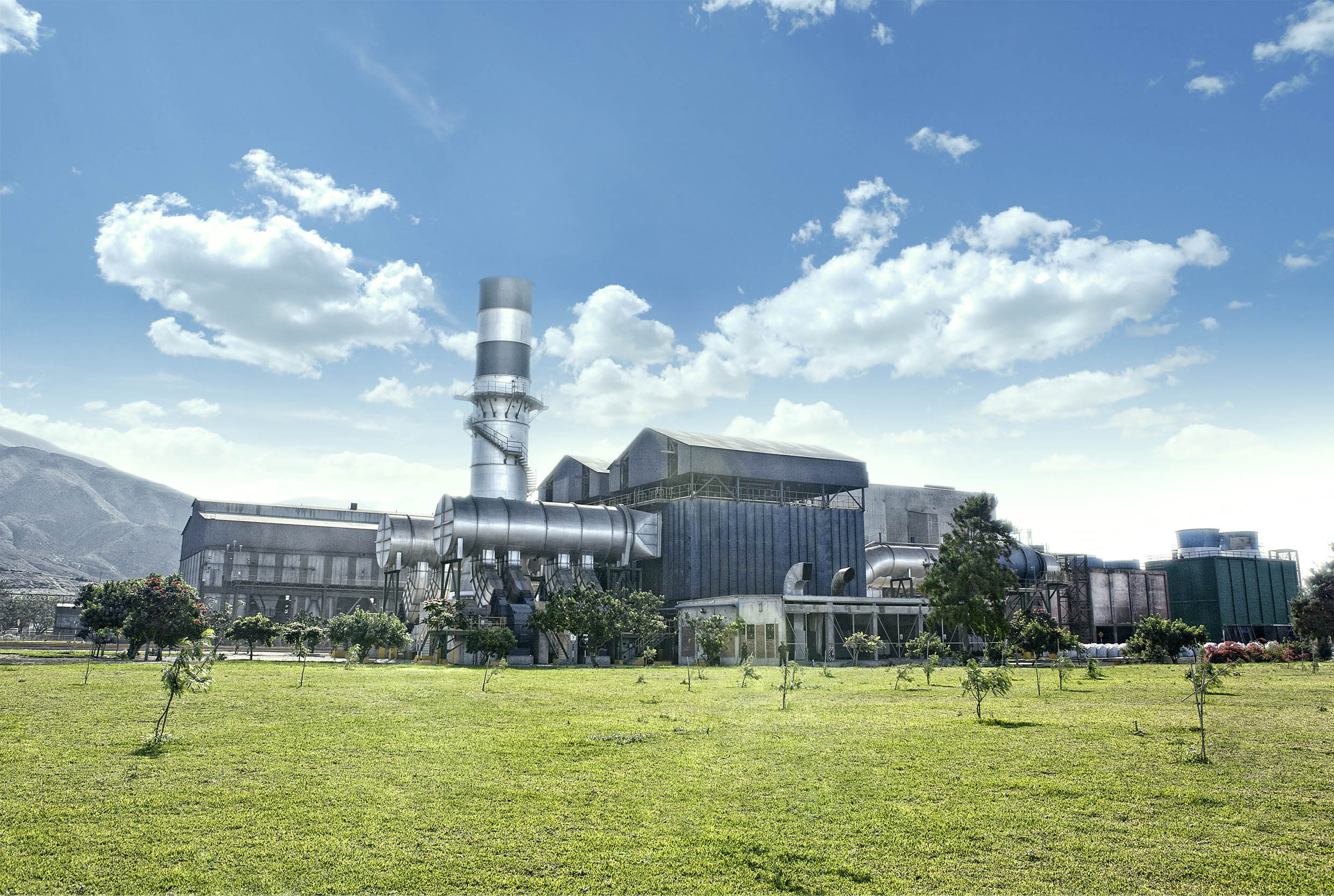
SIDERPERU factory

Chimbote is the largest fishing port in the world. Chimbote has more than 30 fish factories. One of the companies in Chimbote that stands out the most is the steel company SIDERPERU, it is the first steel company in Peru. Produces and markets high quality steel products, intended for the construction, mining and industrial sectors; both in the local and foreign markets. It has been part of Gerdau since 2006, a leader in the production of long steel on the American Continent.

During the 1970s, the El Niño climate pattern, an earthquake, and overfishing drastically affected the fishing industry, and restrictions were imposed to ensure its survival. More than 75 percent of Peru's fishing industry is based in Chimbote.

Chimbote also has beaches that support tourism.

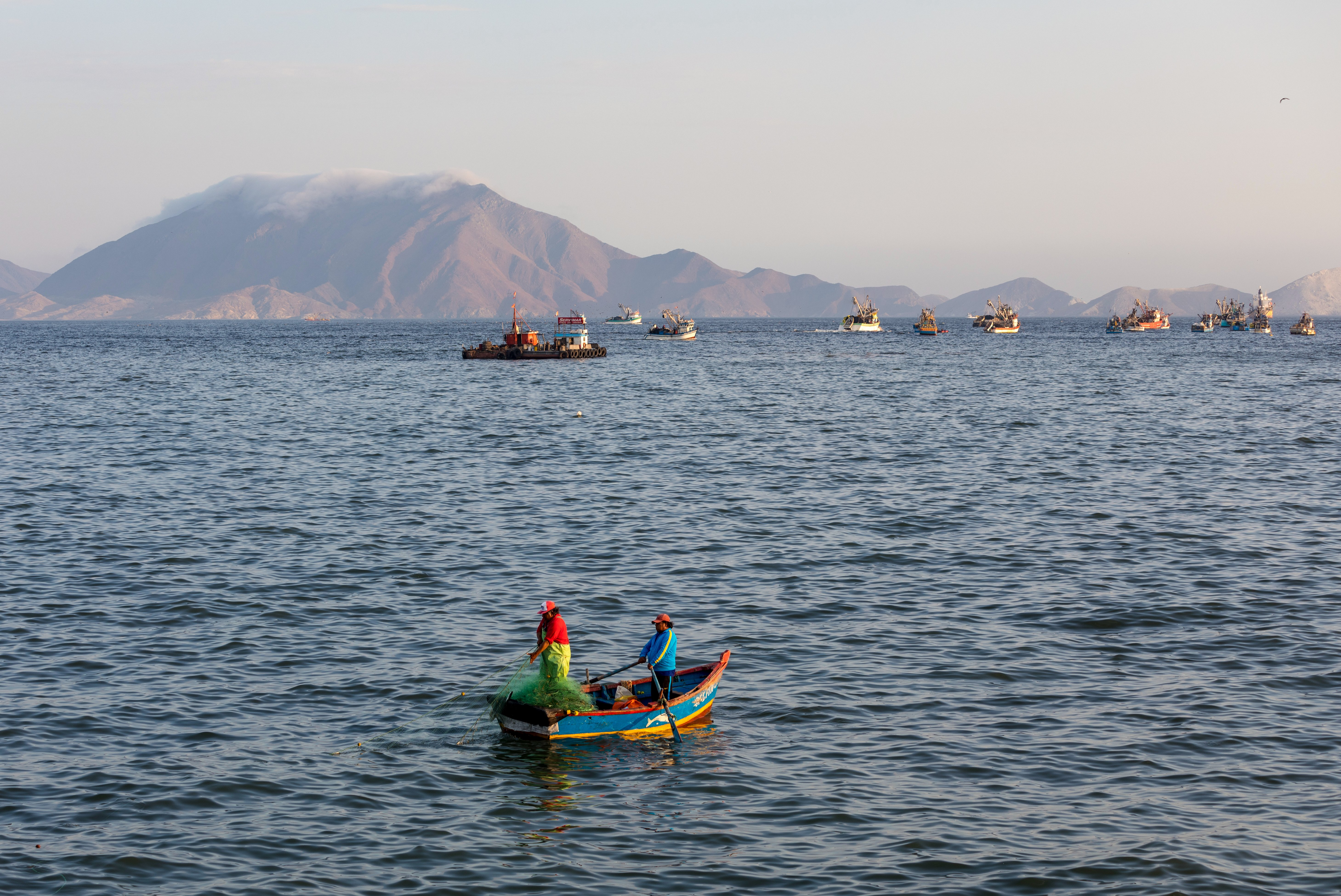
Fishers off the coast of Chimbote

=== Peruvian anchoveta "boom" ===
Shortly after the fish canning industry declined, the industrialization of anchoveta fishing peaked. This attracted people from all over Peru, due to the high wages paid in the fishing industry at the time, fueling Chimbote's suburban growth. The strong migratory wave toward the city increased because of the serious crisis of the countryside in the 1960s, particularly in Ancash, Cajamarca and the northern part of La Libertad Region. The axis of development moved from the Pima cotton, sugarcane, and rice plantations to the large city. In addition, Chimbote was a natural exit channel for the exports of the Santa valley, and a starting point for the entry to the Callejón de Huaylas.

The Peruvian anchoveta boom created wealth in the city, but it soon ended due to indiscriminate fishing that overwhelmed the bio-mass. An earthquake in 1970 damaged to the facilities of the fishing industries, causing unemployment and impoverishment. During this period, the Diocese of Chimbote created the Social Welfare Commission, to organize diverse popular dining places in conjunction with UNICEF. Since the 1960s, the Roman Catholic Diocese of Pittsburgh has served the poor at the Chimbote Mission, raising funds through the Chimbote Foundation.

== Government ==
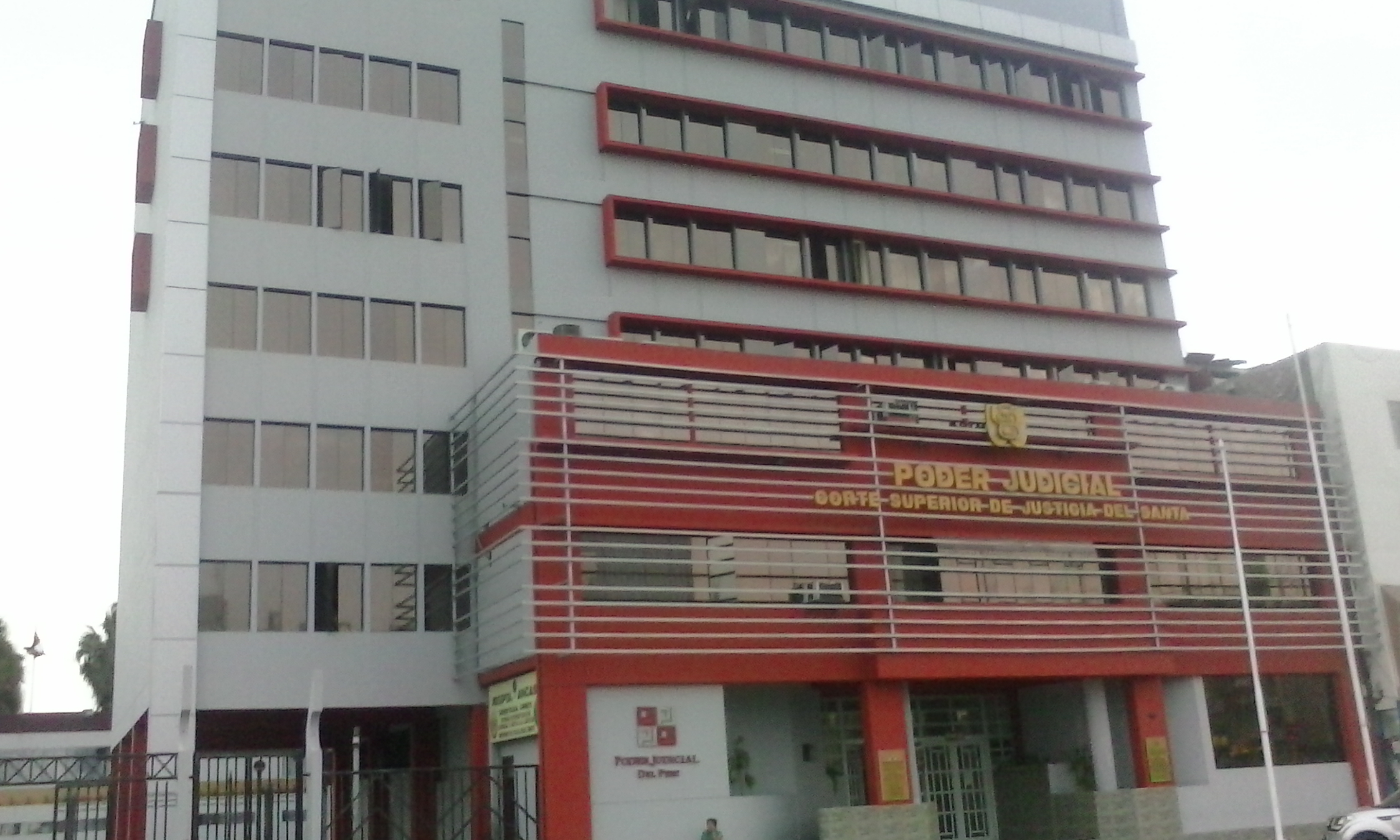
Poder Judicial building

Chimbote is the capital of the province of Santa, a subdivision of the Department of Ancash. Its metropolitan area is divided between the districts of Chimbote and Nuevo Chimbote. It is the headquarters of the provincial government and the Superior Court of Justice of the Judicial District of Santa, as well as the Costa Health Directorate, created in January 2005.

== Tourism ==
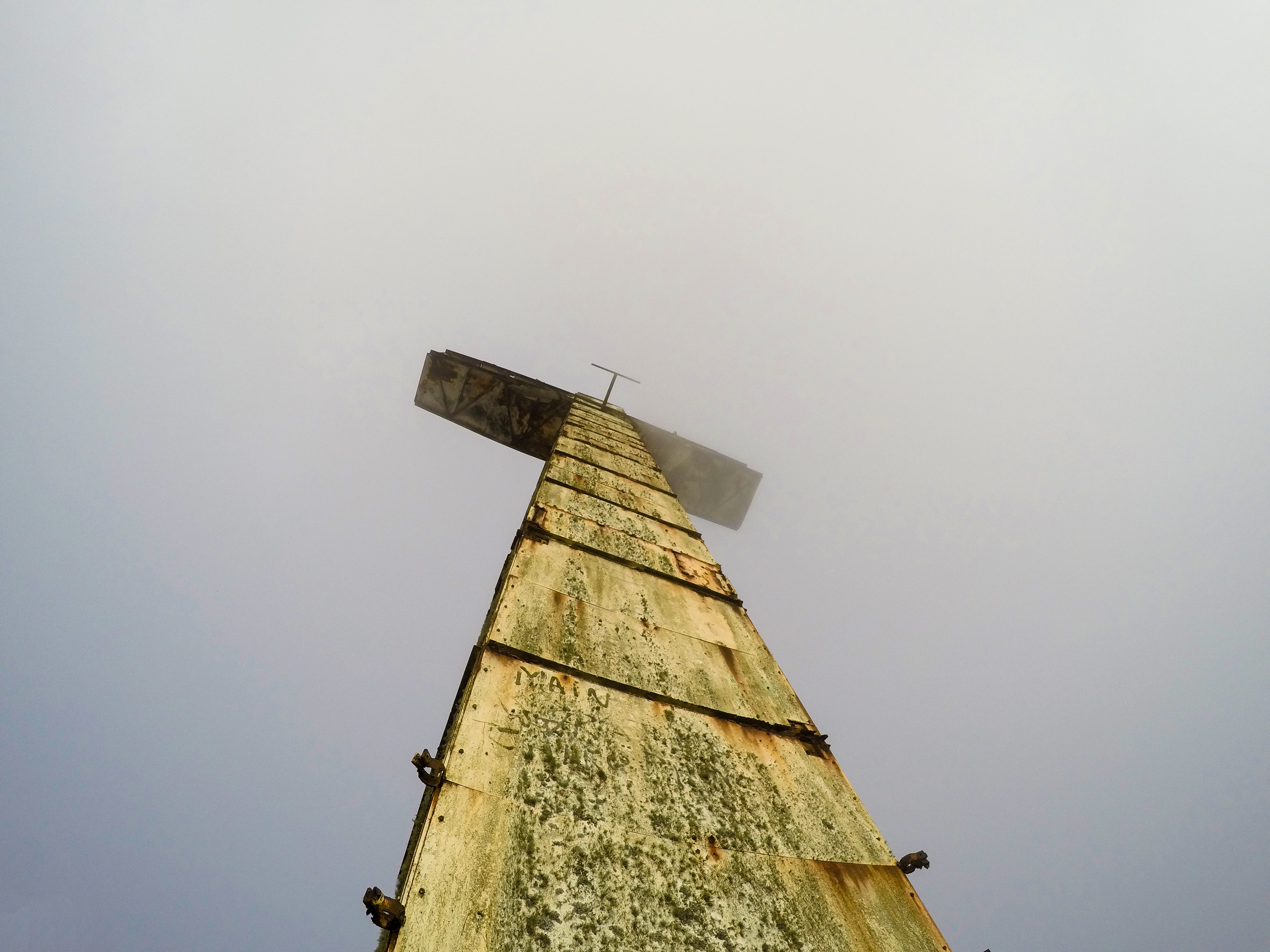
Cross at the top of Cerro de la Juventud (Mountain of Youth) aka Cerro de la Paz (Mountain of Peace)

Chimbote is surrounded by two natural bays, the Bay of Chimbote (or Ferrol) and the Bay of Samanco, both with excellent harbor conditions. Chimbote forms a conurbation with Nuevo Chimbote District to the south. Between these districts, the Humedales de Villa María, a swamp, is home to a local species of heron, along with many species of frogs and fish. The swamp is formed by the Lacramarca River.

To the south of the city, there are many beaches, such as Vesique, Los Chimús, Tortugas, Caleta Colorada and el Dorado. Also located near Chimbote is the Isla Blanca (white isle, in English), which takes its name from the white color of the ground. Isla Blanca measures approximately 3,200 meters (10,500 ft) in length and 920 meters (3,020 ft) in width, and reaches 204 meters (669 ft) above sea level.

Located next to the city is the Cerro de la Juventud (Mountain of Youth), also called Cerro de la Paz (Mountain of Peace). Since 1985, this tourist attraction attracts hundreds annually. Visitors appreciate a panoramic view of Chimbote's bay from the top of this mountain. Tourists can also visit Isla Blanca Boulevard, which has many beautiful marble sculptures and fountains.

From Chimbote, some short tourist circuits can be taken:

- Chimbote – Casma – Sechín – Yaután
- Chimbote – Nepeña – San Jacinto – Moro – Jimbe
- Chimbote – Santa – Huallanca

The city is known for its ceviche, a popular Peruvian dish whose ingredients include white fish, octopus, seashell, squid, crab, and red hot pepper.

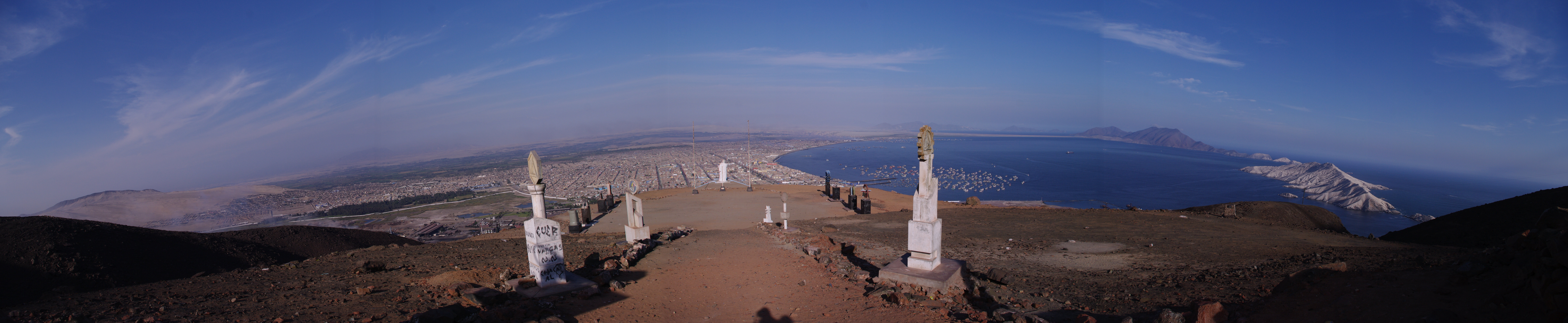
View of the city of Chimbote from the Cerro de la Paz.

== Culture ==
Chimbote is a typical Peruvian city with Peruvian culture being prominent.

=== Literature ===
Literature is the most developed of the arts in Chimbote. The port has undoubtedly become the cultural epicenter of the country's interior, with a notable bibliographic production and outstanding authors who have won important awards in the genres they cultivate. For example, in 2008 the narrator Fernando Cueto won second place in the National Political Novel Prize; the poet Denisse Vega received the "Young Poet of Peru" Award; and the chronicler Augusto Rubio Acosta was honored in December of that year with the CVR + 5 National Journalism Prize awarded by the Peruvian Press Council. In addition, the novelist John Yunca Cruz, who was awarded the Medal of the City of Nuevo Chimbote for the Bicentennial of Peru on July 27, 2021.

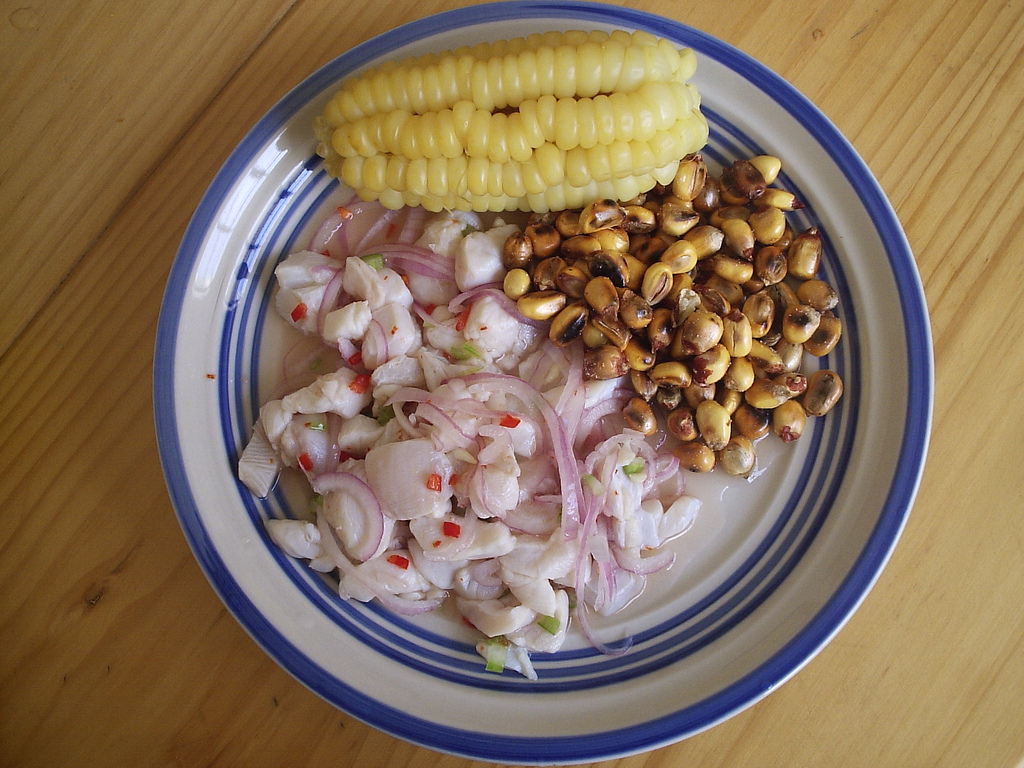
Ceviche

=== Food ===
The first substratum of the Chimbotana culture was that of the fishing towns of the north coast, influenced in the past by the Moche and Chimor and later by the West through Spanish culture. During the steel and fishing boom, the great migration produced the adhesion of diverse cultural patterns from both the coast and the mountains of the country. As a result, city is known for its ceviche, a popular Peruvian dish whose ingredients include white fish, octopus, seashell, squid, crab, and red hot pepper. It is very abundant in the city, due to its proximity to the Pacific Ocean and surplus of fish. Seafood is the most popular food category in Chimbote. Another popular dish is spicy guinea pig, or in folk dance, marinera is as popular as huaino and other arts.

A typical Chimbote dish is el plato combinado, with papa de la huancaina, ceviche, and tallarines rojos.

=== Festivals ===
Chimbote has two important celebrations during the year: Holy Week and The Festivity of San Pedrito of Chimbote (also called Chimbote's Civic Anniversary).

- Patronal feast of San Pedrito, this festival has its origins in the 16th century with the first fishermen who populated Chimbote coming from Huanchaco. It is held from 23 to 30 June in devotion to the patron saint of fishermen San Pedro. The central feast day is on 29 June, the image of the saint is taken out in procession and It is paraded through the bay by boat.

=== Religion ===
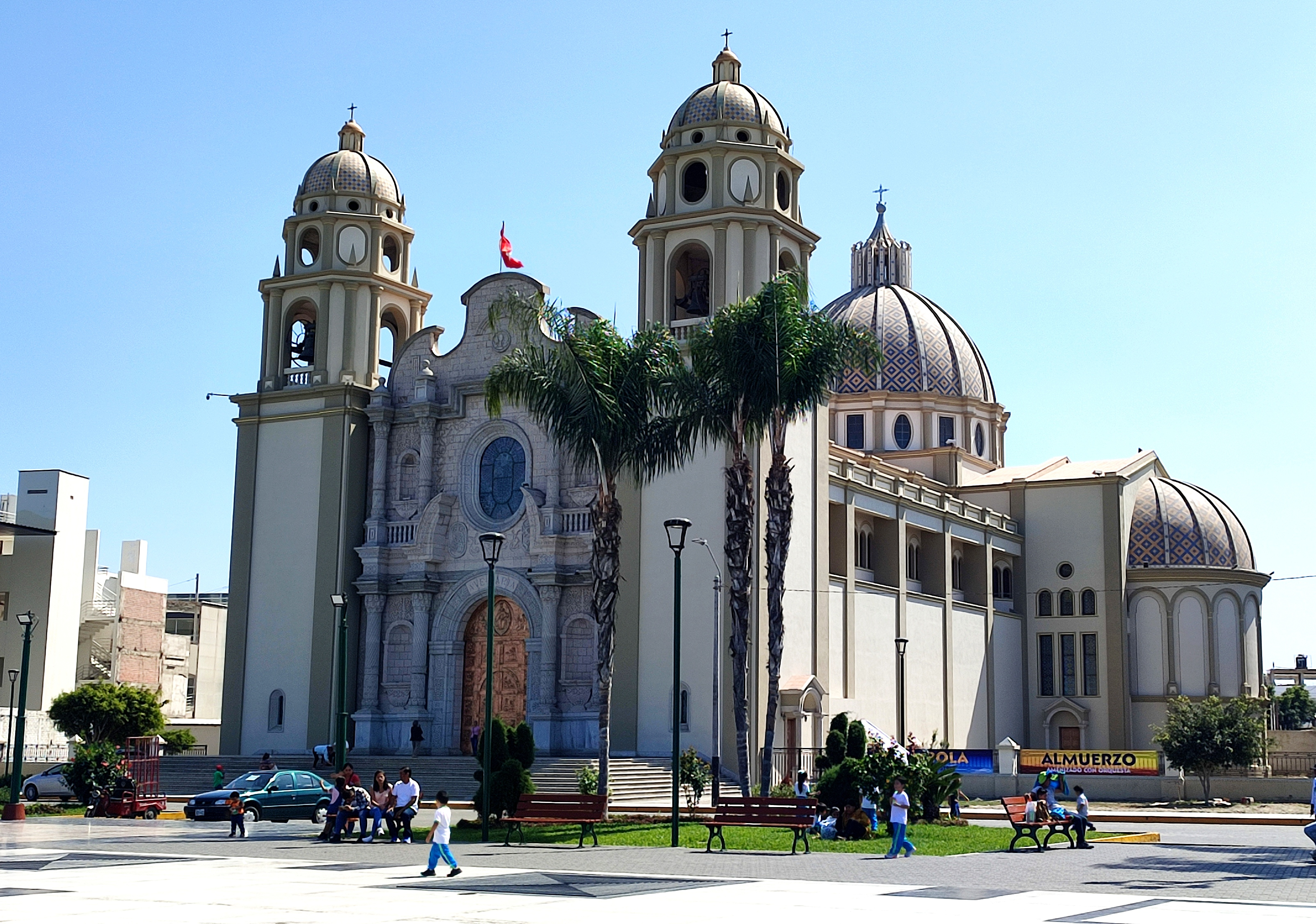
Chimbote Cathedral

The most practiced religion in Chimbote is Catholicism. It is home to the Roman Catholic Diocese of Chimbote of the ecclesiastical province of Trujillo, based at the Chimbote Cathedral. The patrons of the city are the Three Martyrs of Chimbote.

=== Sports ===
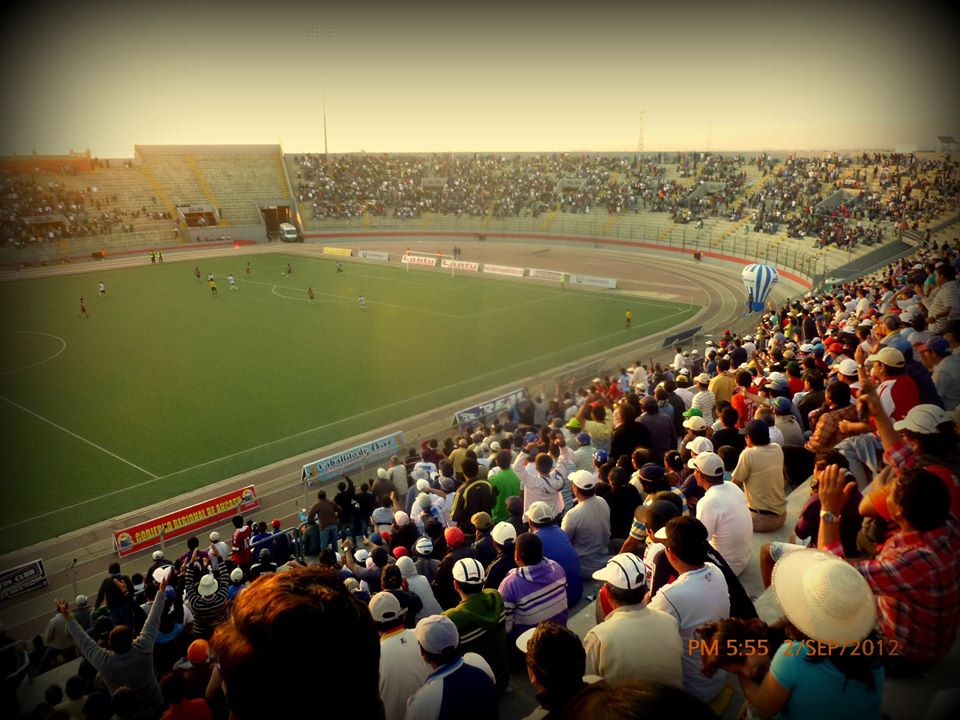
Estadio Manuel Rivera Sánchez

Association football is the main sport practiced in Chimbote. Like in the rest of the country, Chimbotan football is represented by the historic José Gálvez FBC and its classic rival Unión Juventud, which are considered among the most popular teams in the Peruvian North and are the most traditional and popular clubs for the "chimbotana" fans. Chimbote's largest stadium is Estadio Manuel Rivera Sánchez, which is one of the largest stadiums in Peru, which a capacity of 32,000. Another stadium is Estadio Manuel Gómez Arellano, built in 2020.

Volleyball, basketball and surfing are also popular sports in Chimbote.

== Education ==
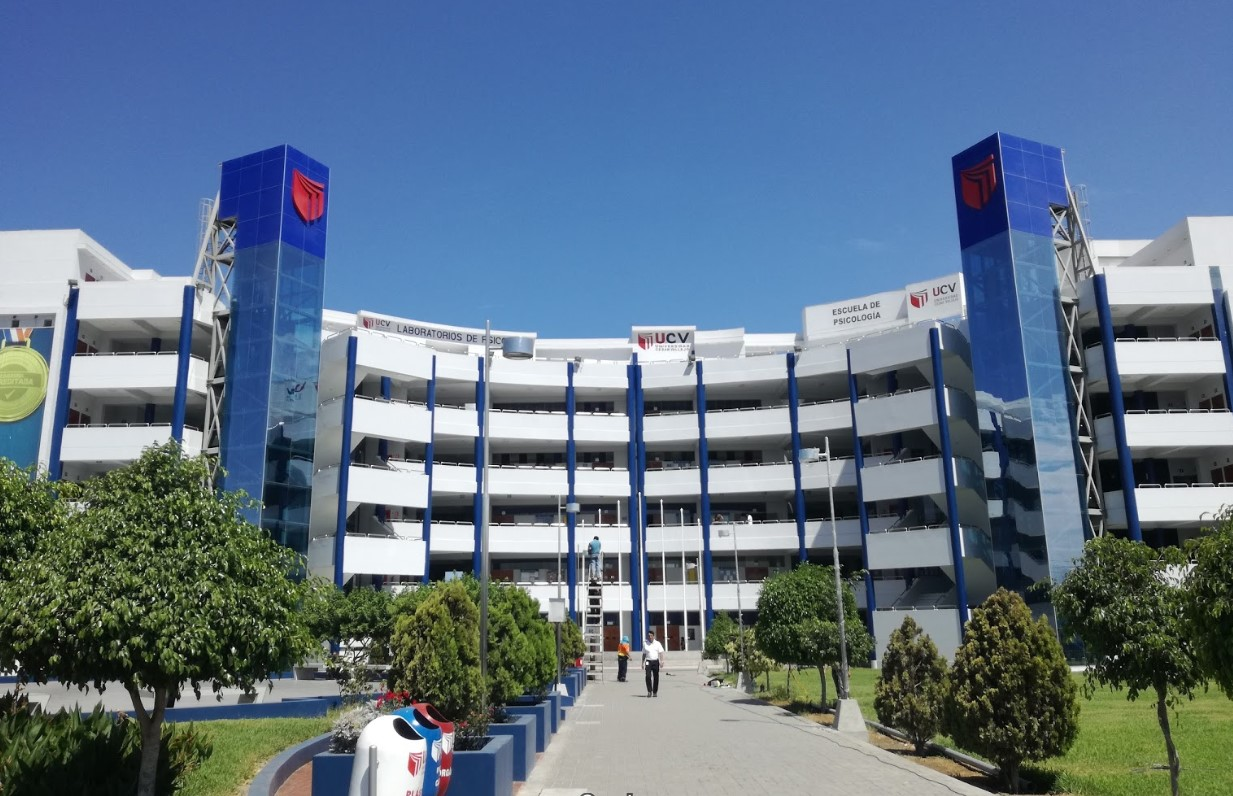
Universidad César Vallejo Chimbote

Currently, Chimbote has five universities. A public one, the National University of Santa - UNS; four private ones, the Universidad San Pedro (USP), the Universidad Católica Los Ángeles de Chimbote (ULADECH); and two affiliates, the Universidad César Vallejo (UCV), and one affiliate of the Technological University of Peru (UTP). The Academia Preuniversitaria "Perpetuo Socorro" and the Catholic University Los Angeles of Chimbote are located in Chimbote.

== Transportation ==
=== Air ===
The city is served by the Teniente FAP Jaime Montreuil Morales Airport, operated by CORPAC S.A. It was created in 1957 under the government of President Manuel Prado Ugarteche. There are regular flights to Lima by LC Busre.

=== Rail ===
The Chimbote-Huallanca rail line, built in 1922, serves as a railway for coal and iron mines on the interior and a railway for the river valley by transporting rice, cotton, sugarcane, and bananas.

=== Bus terminal ===
El Chimbador Bus Terminal is Chimbote's primary ground transportation facility. The bus terminal is located outside of the city. It has become a vital connection for the region's workers, travelers and visitors, serving nearly 6,000 passengers a day. Currently there are 30 bus carriers offering services for national and international travel.

=== Port ===
The port of Chimbote is considered by some one of the most beautiful and safest ports in the Peruvian coast. It extends 12 kilometers (7.5 mi), from Caleta Colorada Bay (Red Creek Bay) in the north, where the present marine facilities are located, to Anconcillo in the south.

== Sister cities ==
- Asunción, Paraguay
- Buenos Aires, Argentina
- Belo Horizonte, Brazil
- Huancayo, Peru
- Yokohama, Japan
- Nantes, France
- Madrid, Spain
- Pensacola, United States
- San José, Costa Rica
- Seattle, United States
- Pittsburgh, United States

== See also ==
- Ancash Region
- 1970 Ancash earthquake
- Three Martyrs of Chimbote, patrons of the City of Cimbote
