= Santi Primo e Feliciano, Pavia =

- Santi Primo e Feliciano
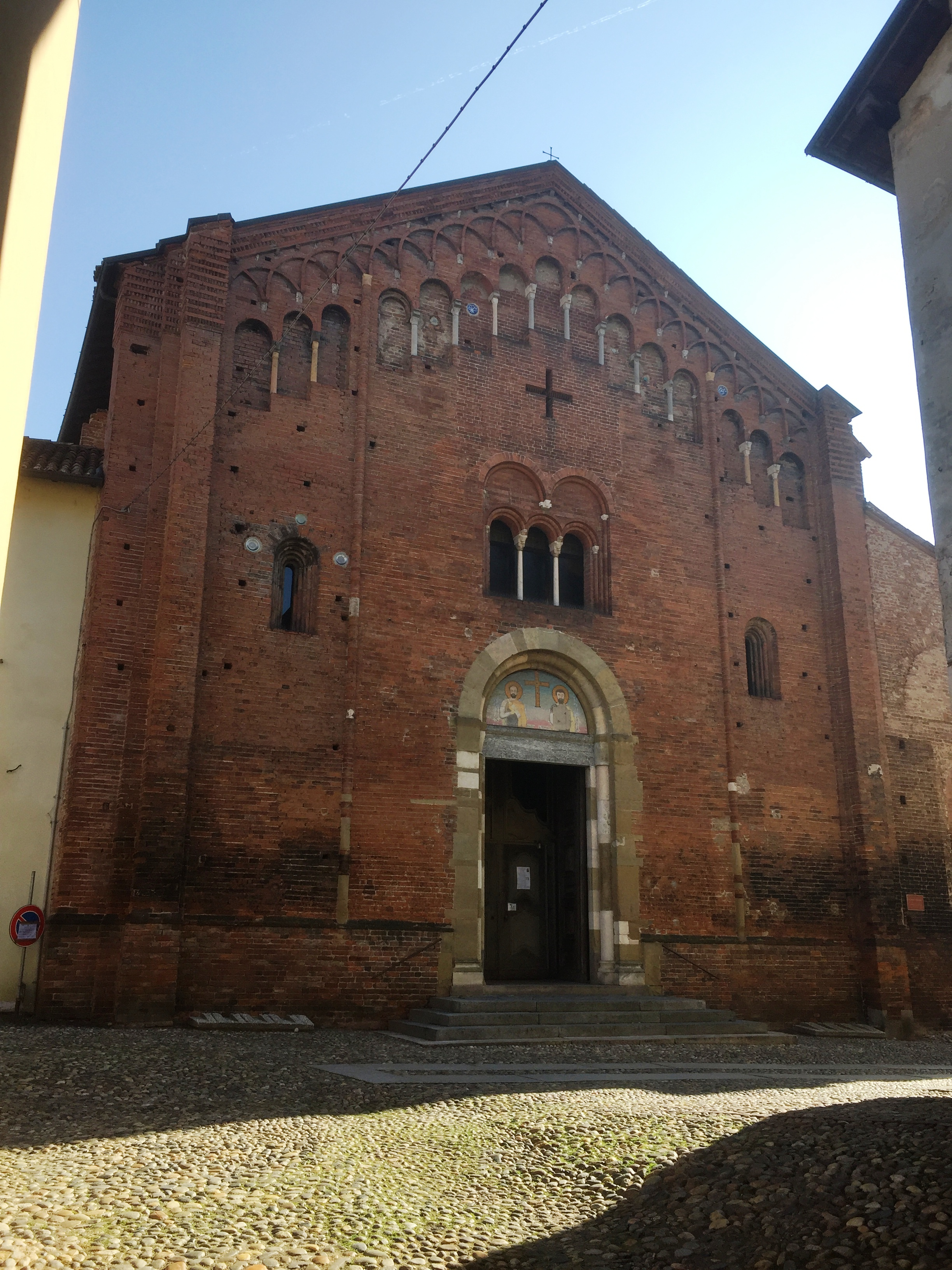
- Façade of the building

- Location within Northern Italy Location within Italy
- 45°10′56″N 9°09′40″E
- Location: Pavia
- Country: Italy
- Denomination: Catholic

History
- Founded: 12th Century
- Dedication: Primus and Felician

Architecture
- Functional status: Active
- Style: Romanesque

Specifications
- Materials: Brick, sandstone

Administration
- Diocese: Diocese of Pavia

Santi Primo e Feliciano is a Romanesque-style Roman Catholic church in the town center of Pavia, Italy.

== History ==
A church at the site is documented since the 12th century, on the remains of Roman buildings: archaeological excavations carried out between 2008 and 2009 in the courtyard of the church have brought to light the remains of structures and tombs from the Late Antiquity. It belonged to a college of canons regular who in 1354, became members of the Congregation of Servants of Mary, and so remained till the 18th century. The convent was suppressed in 1810.

== Architecture ==
The original structure had three naves, but in the 15th century an additional nave was added. In the 16th century, the church was reduced to a single nave, with demolition of the prior apse. The facade it is enriched in the terminal part by a blind loggia with intertwined hanging arches that crown the top. The first chapel on the right has a Virgin and child with Blessed Bertoni and St John the Baptist (1498) by Agostino da Vaprio. The superior lunette has a fresco depicting God the Father. The transept has a large canvas depicting the Martyrdom of St Lawrence by Marcantonio Pellini (1664-1760). The presbytery has two lateral frescoes depicting the Life of Saints Primo and Feliciano (1860) by Bardotti. They depict The Trial of the Saints on the left, and Martyrdom of the Saints, on the right. The first chapel on the left has a Crucifixion with St Pellegrino by Sabbadini.

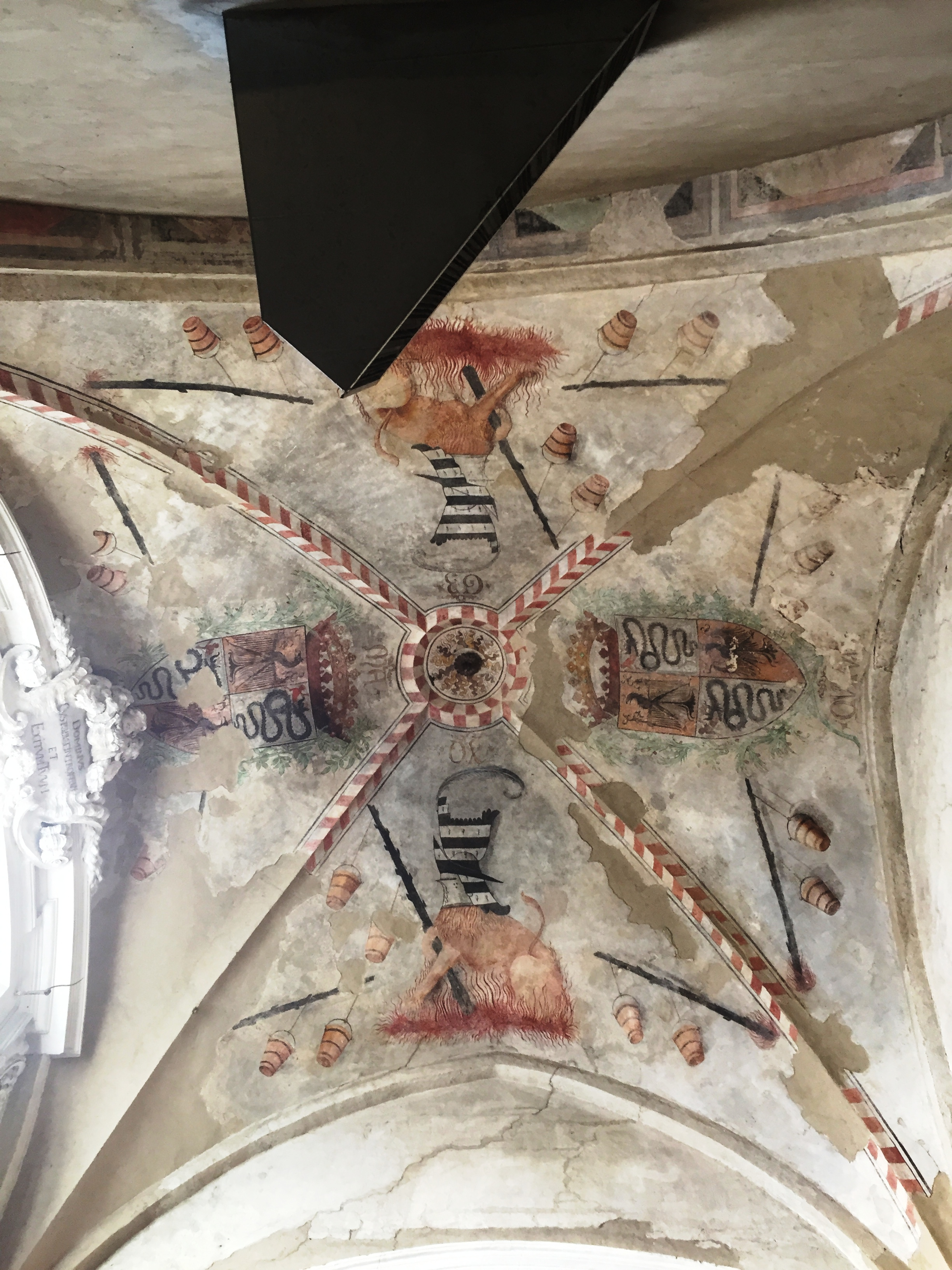
One of the surviving medieval naves frescoed with the Visconti coats of arms.

To the left of the baptismal font there is a 14th century painted marble statue depicting Saint Blaise. On the counter-façade there is a painted Madonna and child attributed to the school of Bernardino Luini. In the counterface of the Gothic nave annexed to the church there is a large fresco representing Christ with the Apostles in the upper part and, in the lower part, the Virgin surrounded by two angels who take souls from Purgatory, while other paintings on the vaults represent Sforza coats of arms and Galeati lions, a company of Galeazzo Maria Sforza, these works were carried out between 1460 and 1491.
