= Academia Preuniversitaria "Perpetuo Socorro" =

Coordinates: 8.1153°S 79.0309°W

The Academia Preuniversitaria "Perpetuo Socorro" (The 'Perpetuo Socorro' Pre-University Academy) is a Roman Catholic higher educational institute located in Chimbote, Ancash, Peru.

== History ==
The Academia was first founded in 2003 and ran through to 2006. In July 2008 it was reopened and continues to function today. Since 2009 the Academia has been part of CHOI (Chimbote Opportunities Limited) and works alongside the Rotary Club's student grant program "Dolares para Escolares" (Grants for Students).

Like other similar institutes, the Academia is attended by students who have completed secondary school and wish to go on to further or higher education. Since secondary school students in Peru do not take standardised national examinations, students are required to take a very difficult entrance exam for universities, colleges and technical institutes. Pre University Academies prepare young people for these exams and for student life in general.

The "Perpetuo Socorro" Academia differs from other similar institutes in that it is a non-profit organisation created to help a specific group of underprivileged young people. The Academia is located in an area where people live in extreme poverty. It gives young people from the locality the opportunity to study. Without the support and low-cost or free classes provided by Academia, these young people could not continue their education.

Since 2003, students from the Academia have successfully gone on to study in national and private universities, and further education or technical institutes.

Since 2009, the Academia has worked alongside the Rotary Club's "Dolares para Escolares" (Grants for Students) program. This gives students at the Academia the further benefit of applying for continued economic and personal support throughout their time at university or at technical institutes. Students receive help with matriculation fees, tuition fees, charges for study materials and books, travel expenses and receive continued emotional and personal support throughout their education.

== Subjects ==
Students at the Academia study and review a range of subjects to help them with entrance exams:

- Mathematical Reasoning
- Spanish Language and Textual Analysis
- Algebra
- Arithmetic
- Spanish Language and Literature
- Biology and Anatomy
- History
- Geography
- Chemistry
- Psychology
- Philosophy
- Economics
- English as a Foreign Language
