= Nicola de Nicoli =

Italian painter

Nicola de Nicoli (active second half of 17th-century) was an Italian painter. He was a pupil of Giacomo Apollonio and active in Bassano del Grappa, painting mainly religious subjects. In 1668, he painted a St Ignatius of Loyola for the Cathedral of Bassano. he painted a San Nicola with child Jesus for the chapel of San Nicola da Tolentino in the church of Santa Caterina of Bassano.
