= Three Martyrs of Chimbote =

Group of two Polish Franciscan priests and one Italian missionary priest

Blessed Three Martyrs of Chimbote
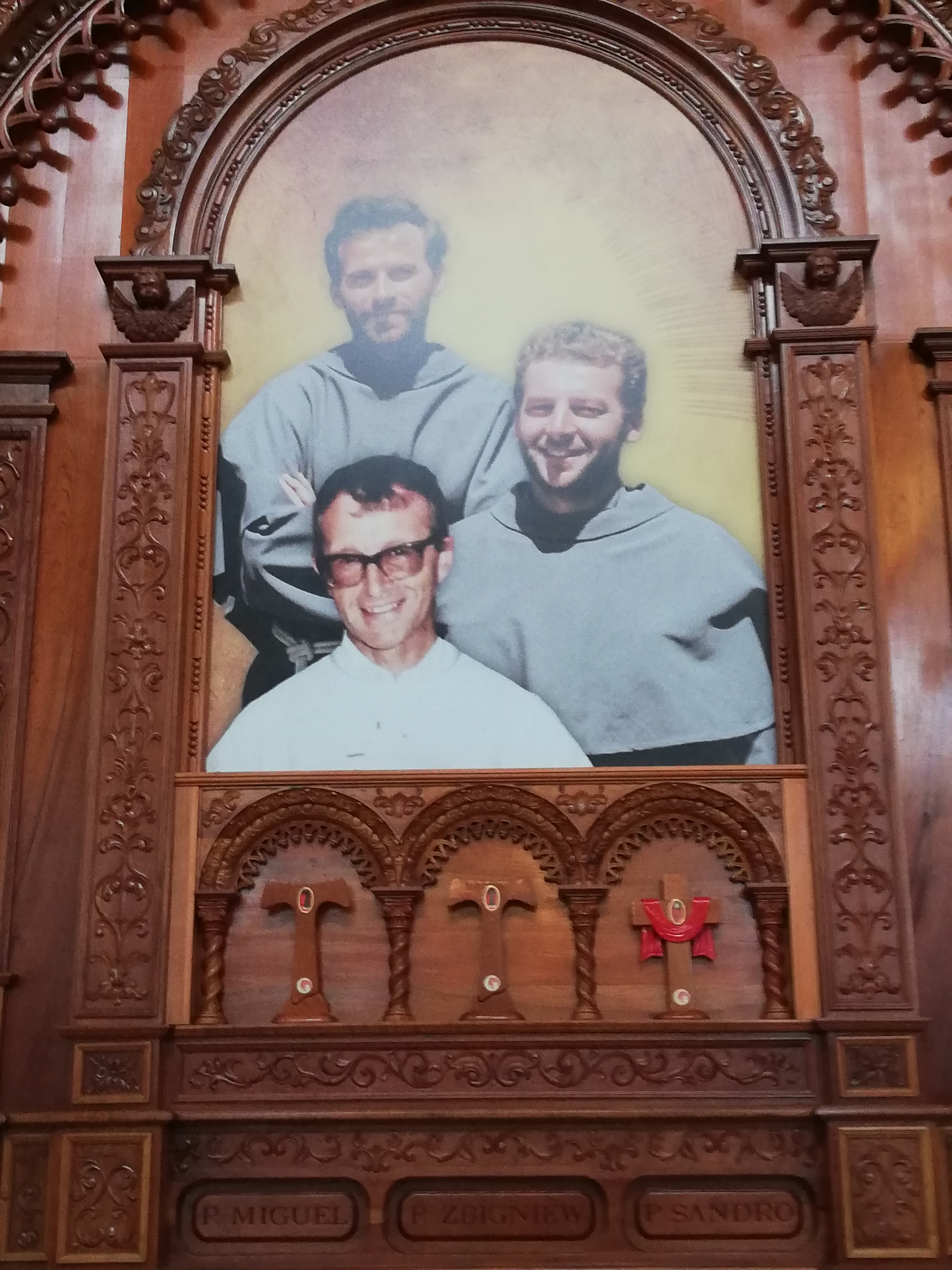
- Michał, Zbigniew and Alessandro in Catedral of Chimbote

Priests; Martyrs
- Born: Michał Tomaszek : 23 September 1960; Łękawica, Żywiec, Poland; Zbigniew Adam Strzałkowski : 3 July 1958; Tarnów, Poland; Alessandro Dordi : 23 January 1931; Gromo San Marino, Bergamo, Italy
- Died: Michał Tomaszek : 9 August 1991 (aged 30); Pariacoto, Ancash, Peru; Zbigniew Adam Strzałkowski : 9 August 1991 (aged 33); Pariacoto, Ancash, Peru; Alessandro Dordi : 25 August 1991 (aged 60); Riconada, Ancash, Peru
- Venerated in: Catholic Church
- Beatified: 5 December 2015, Chimbote, Peru by Cardinal Angelo Amato
- Feast: 9 August (Tomaszek & Strzałkowski; former); 25 August (Dordi); 7 June (Tomaszek & Strzałkowski; current)
- Attributes: Franciscan habit; Priest's cassock
- Patronage: Chimbote; Missionaries

The Three Martyrs of Chimbote were a group of two Polish Franciscan priests and one Italian missionary priest murdered in Peru in 1991 by the Shining Path communist guerillas. Michał Tomaszek and Zbigniew Adam Strzałkowski, and Alessandro Dordi were murdered on 9 and 25 August 1991 respectively.

Both Polish Franciscans dedicated their work to the faithful of Peru in charitable and merciful acts that appealed to their Franciscan charism, taking as their models for their work both Saint Francis of Assisi and Saint Maximilian Kolbe. In response to a drought in 1989, the two friars brought with them food from Caritas to cater to the immediate needs of the people. Yet the two also catechized the faithful and preached on various saints, in the process, revitalizing the faith of the Peruvian people.

Dordi served in Peru since 1980 and tended to the social needs of the Peruvian people while assisting with rural development programs and for his esteemed preaching abilities.

Pope Francis gave approval on 3 February 2015 to their beatification after affirming their martyrdom, and the celebration of beatification was celebrated in Peru by Cardinal Angelo Amato on 5 December 2015. A miracle attributed to the three will be required for their eventual canonization.

== Biographies ==
=== Michał Tomaszek ===
Tomaszek was born on 23 September 1960 and was a professed member of the Conventual Franciscans; he received the Franciscan habit on 4 October 1980 on the feast of Saint Francis of Assisi.

Tomaszek was baptized a month after his birth in Saint Michael's parish in his home town and was an altar boy at the time he received his First Communion in 1969 at the same time his father died. He graduated from high school in 1975 and continued his studies in a Franciscan seminary, professing his temporary vows in 1981. He commenced his novitiate after five years of study and studied theology from 1981 to 1987. He studied both philosophy and theology and defended his thesis on moral theology

He was ordained to the priesthood on 23 May 1987.

On 24 July 1989, he was dispatched to Peru and despite threats against him, he continued his missionary activities alongside fellow Franciscan Zbigniew Adam Strzałkowski. In 1991, he was abducted and murdered by the Shining Path Communist guerilla faction.

=== Zbigniew Adam Strzałkowski ===
Strzałkowski was born on 3 July 1958 and was a professed member of the Conventual Franciscans. He was baptized a week following his birth and made his First Communion in 1967.

He graduated from secondary schooling in 1978 and he joined the Franciscan order the following year. He studied both philosophy and theology while in the seminary and after this was ordained as a priest on 7 June 1986 by Henryk Gulbinowicz. He served as the assistant rector at the minor seminary in Legnica for two years.

He professed his solemn vows on 8 December 1984 prior to his ordination.

He commenced missionary work in Peru from November 1988. He tended to the ill who often referred to him as "our little doctor" since he helped the ill to get better through words of comfort or providing them with the Eucharist. It was during the course of his work in Peru that he met Michał Tomaszek. Both were abducted in 1991 and were murdered by a Communist terrorist group.

=== Alessandro Dordi ===
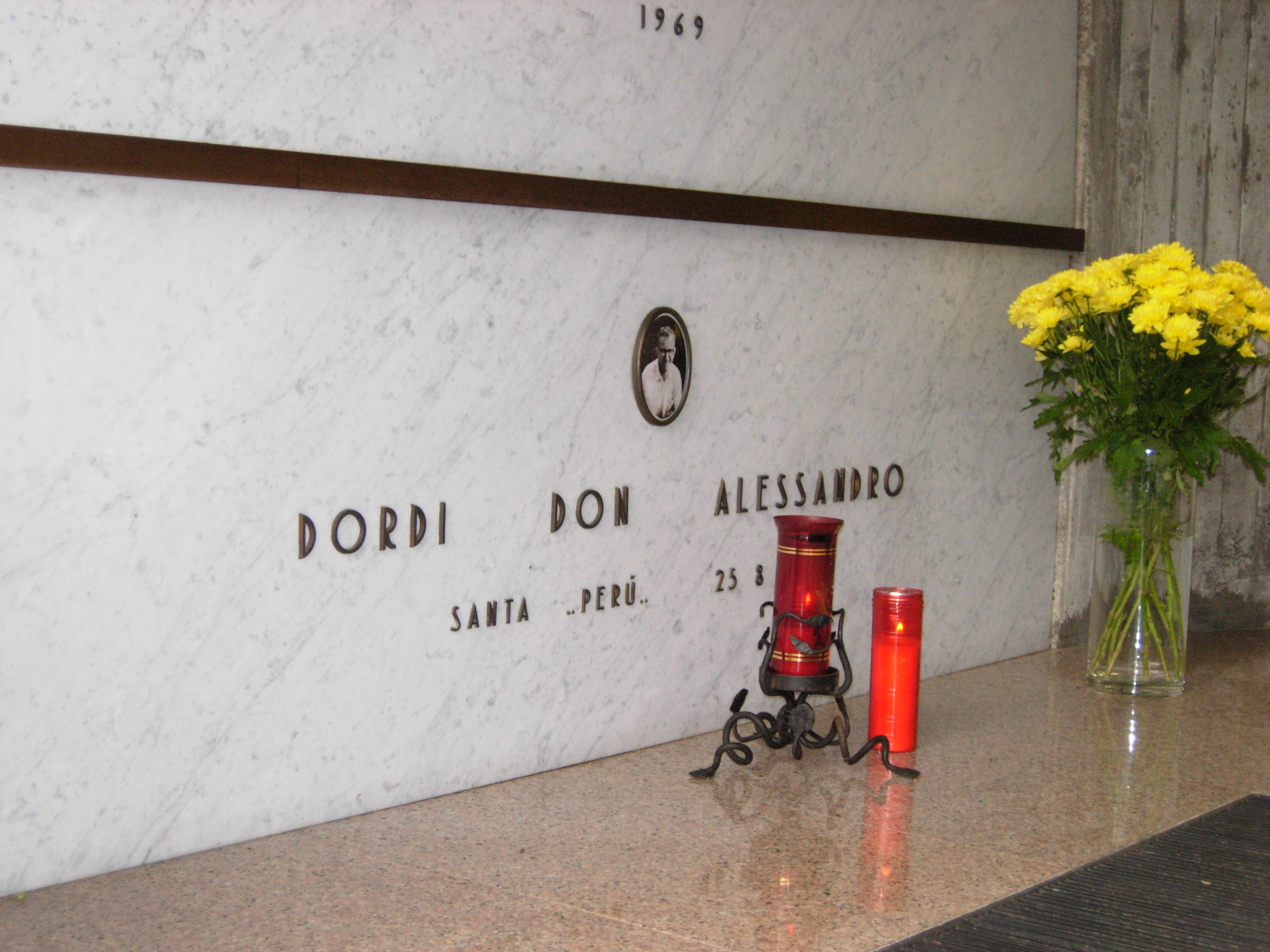
Tomb of Alessandro Dordi.

Dordi was born on 23 January 1931 and he served as a priest in his birthplace of Bergamo.

Dordi had administered to Italian immigrants in Switzerland and he served in watch factories there as a worker-priest. It was there that he became aware of the concerns of the working class and decided to place great focus on social matters.

He was also a member of the missions of Fidei Donum and travelled to Peru where he did work in the missions there. He served in the Santa parish and was committed to the farming sector while helping them implement rural development programs. At the time he learned of the fates of the two Polish friars' fate, Tomaszek and Strzałkowski with whom he was friends with, he kept telling his close collaborators that he would be the next victim of the Shining Path terrorist group; indeed, they deemed Dordi a great threat.

On 25 August 1991, while returning from celebrating Mass and administering baptisms at a nearby chapel, he was ambushed and shot to death.

== Beatification ==
The cause for the beatification of the three priests commenced under Pope John Paul II with the declaration of "nihil obstat" (nothing against) on 5 June 1995 which opened the cause in Peru to investigate their deaths and both their lives and their work in Chimbote; the process spanned from 9 August 1996 until 25 August 2002. The documentation was submitted to the Congregation for the Causes of Saints in Rome in 2011 after the diocesan process closed.

Pope Francis approved the beatification in 2015 which occurred on 5 December 2015; Cardinal Angelo Amato presided over the mass.

The pope venerated the relics of the two Poles at a Franciscan convent on the occasion of his visit to Poland for World Youth Day 2016.

The Congregation for Divine Worship and the Discipline of the Sacraments approved the request of the Franciscans – on 26 February 2016 – that the liturgical feast for the two Poles be moved from 9 August to 7 June.

On 5 December 2025, Pope Leo XIV sent a message to Pilgrims on the 10th anniversary of the Martyrs' beatification, marking to his own missionary work as priest and bishop in Peru, and calling for Christian unity in the way the three lived and died.
