= Braga (disambiguation) =

Braga is a city in Portugal.

Braga may also refer to:

== Associated with the Portuguese city ==
- Braga District containing the city
- Braga (Maximinos, Sé e Cividade), a civil parish in the city
- Braga (São José de São Lázaro e São João do Souto), a civil parish in the city
- Archdiocese of Braga
- Braga Airport
- HC Braga, a roller hockey club
- SC Braga, a sports club, including a football team

== Other uses ==
- Braga (surname), a list of people with the name
- Braga, Rio Grande do Sul, Brazil
- Belmiro Braga, Minas Gerais, Brazil
- Braga Street, Bandung, Indonesia
- Bragă, or boza, a low-alcohol fermented grain drink
