= Marcantonio Bragadin (disambiguation) =

Marcantonio Bragadin or Marco Antonio Bragadin may refer to:

- Marco Antonio Bragadin (1523–1571), Venetian lawyer and military officer
- Marcantonio Bragadin (cardinal) (1591–1658), Venetian cardinal who served as Bishop of Vicenza
- Marcantonio Bragadin (admiral) (1906–1986), Italian admiral and screenwriter of a number of war films
