= Marcantonio Dordi =

Italian painter (1598–1663)

Marcantonio Dordi (1598 - 23 October 1663) was an Italian painter, active in Bassano del Grappa.

He was a pupil of Giacomo Appollonio, and later followed the style of painters of the Bassano family. His daughter married a painter Giovanni Goffre, originally of Liege, who trained under Marcantonio. Dordi’s extant oeuvre is modest. According to contemporary reports by the 18th-century art historian Giambattista Verci, of a series of four monumental paintings commemorating the end of the 1630–31 plague in Bassano—two survive today in the Civic Museum: The Procession in Piazza and The Solemn Mass of Thanksgiving
