= Marcantonio Pellini =

Italian painter

Marcantonio Pellini (1659-1760) was an Italian painter, mainly as a figure painter during the Baroque period.

He studied in his native Pavia under Tommaso Gatti. He also worked in Venice and Bologna.
