= List of islands of Peru =

This is a list of islands of Peru.

== Alphabetical list ==
This an alphabetical list of islands in Peru with an area larger than 1 square kilometre (0.39 sq mi).

- Amantaní (9.3 km²)
- Anapia Island (3.4 km²)
- Asia Island (1.5 km²)
- Blanca Island (4.0 km²)
- Caana Island (1.2 km²)
- Chirita Islands (4,8 km²)
- Correa Island (4.6 km²)
- Frontón Island (1.0 km²)
- Ferrol Island (1.6 km²)
- Guañape Islands (1.4 km²)
- Iscaya Island (1.7 km²)
- Independencia Island (11.0 km²)
- Lobos de Tierra Island (16.0 km²)
- Lobos de Afuera Island (2.0 km²)
- Matapalo Island (6.1 km²)
- Quipata Island (1.4 km²)
- San Gallán Island (9.3 km²)
- San Lorenzo Island (16.5 km²)
- Santa Ana Islands (3.4 km²)
- Soto Island (2.6 km²)
- Suasi Island (1.0 km²)
- Taquile Island (5.7 km²)
- Tortuga Island (1.3 km²)
- Ustute Island (1.4 km²)
- Yuspique Island (3.2 km²)
- Viuda Island (1.3 km²)

== Regional list ==
This a regional list of islands in Peru.

=== Ancash ===
- Blanca Island (0.2 km²)

=== Arequipa ===
- Carrizal Island (0.08 km²)
- Casca Island (0.2 km²)
- Los Frailes Island (0.08 km²)
- Hollaques / Huallaques Island (0.1 km²)
- Hornillos Island (0.3 km²)
- "K" Island (0.3 km²)
- "L" Island (0.02 km²)
- "M" Island (0.02 km²)
- Perica Island (0.01 km²)
- Saragosa Island (0.3 km²)

=== Callao ===
- Palomino Islands

=== Moquegua ===
- Coles Island (0.1 km²)

=== Piura ===
- Foca Island (0.9 km²)
- "G" Island (0.4 km²)

== See also ==
- Geography of Peru
- List of Peru-related topics
- List of islands
- List of islands by area
- List of islands by highest point
- List of islands by population
- List of islands in lakes
- List of islands in the Pacific Ocean
- List of islands of South America
