= Karimun =

Karimun may refer to the following places in Indonesia:

- Great Karimun or Karimun Besar, an island of Indonesia, in the Strait of Malacca southwest of Singapore
- Little Karimun or Karimun Kecil, a smaller island just northeast of Great Karimun
- Karimun Regency, an administrative division of Indonesia, including Great and Little Karimun
- Karimun Jawa, a group of small islands off the north coast of Java

== See also ==
- Suzuki Karimun, an automobile model
