= Nuevo Chimbote District =

Coordinates: 9°07′17″S 78°31′51″W

Nuevo Chimbote Nuevo Chimbote
- District
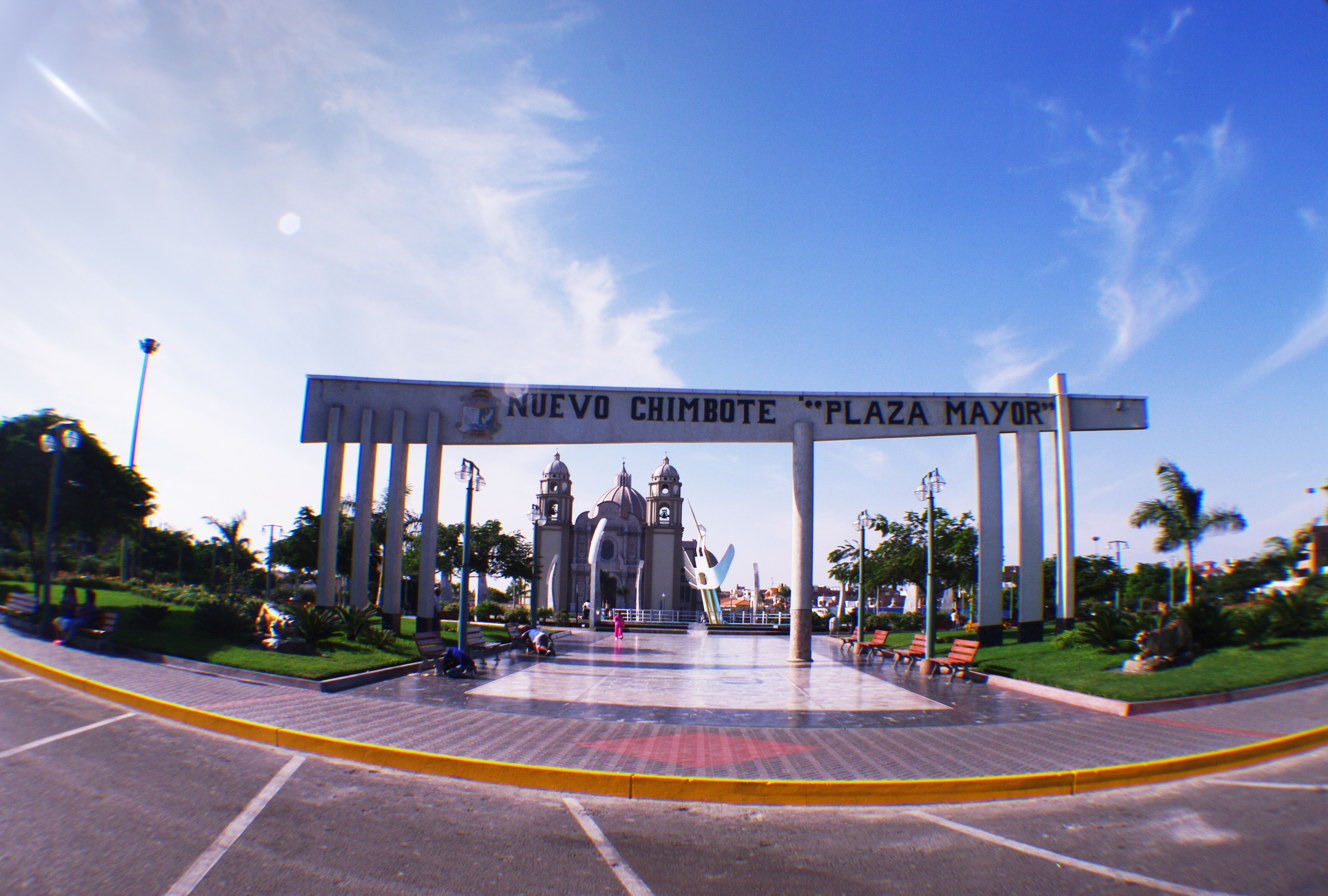

- Flag Coat of arms

- Location of Nuevo Chimbote in the Santa province
- Country: Peru
- Region: Ancash
- Province: Santa
- Founded: May 27, 1994
- Capital: Buenos Aires

Area
  - Total: 389.73 km^{2} (150.48 sq mi)
- Elevation: 25 m (82 ft)

Population (2005 census)
  - Total: 107,095
  - Density: 274.79/km^{2} (711.71/sq mi)
- Time zone: UTC-5 (PET)
- UBIGEO: 021809

The district of Nuevo Chimbote is one of the nine that make up the province of Santa, located in the department of Ancash in Peru.

== Geography ==
It is bordered to the north by the district of Chimbote and to the south by those of Nepeña and Samanco. To the west, it borders the Pacific Ocean, into which the Ferrol Peninsula extends, which together with the Blanca and Ferrol Islands, encloses the Bay of Chimbote. The climate is subtropical desert with almost no rainfall. Temperatures range between 28°C in summer and 13°C in winter.
