= Nepeña =

- Location within Peru
- Coordinates: 9°10′20″S 78°21′31″W
- Country: Peru
- Region: Ancash
- Province: Santa
- Municipality: Nepeña District
- UBIGEO: 021305

Nepeña is a town and the capital of Nepeña District, in the province Santa in Peru.
