= Puncuri =

Puncuri or Puikiri may refer to:

- Puncuri people, an ethnic group of Peru
- Puncuri language, a language of Peru

== See also ==
- Punkurí (es), an archeological site in Peru
