= Punkurí =

Archaeological site in Peru

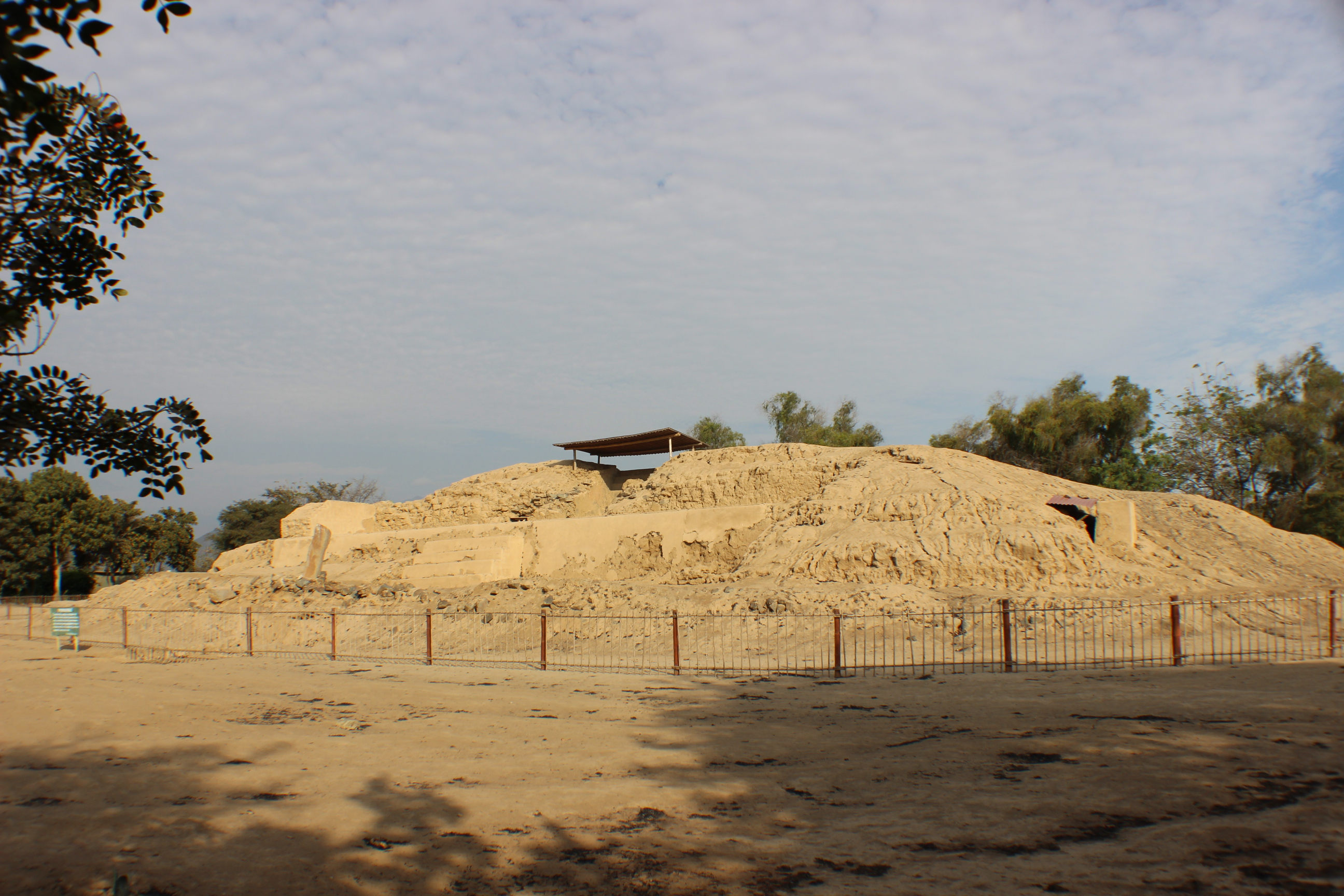
Punkurí

Punkurí is an archaeological site in Nepeña District, in the province of Santa, Peru.
