= Moro District =

Coordinates: 9°07′59″S 78°12′00″W

- District
- Location of Moro in the Santa province
- Country: Peru
- Region: Ancash
- Province: Santa
- Capital: Moro

Area
  - Total: 356.9 km^{2} (137.8 sq mi)
- Elevation: 426 m (1,398 ft)

Population (2017 census)
  - Total: 8,311
  - Density: 23.29/km^{2} (60.31/sq mi)
- Time zone: UTC-5 (PET)
- UBIGEO: 021805

Moro District is one of nine districts of the Santa Province in Peru (not to be confused with the Moro District in the Riau Islands Province of Indonesia). It covers an area of 356.9 km^{2} and had a population of 8,311 at the 2017 Census; the projected population in mid 2022 was 8,791.
