= Víctor Crisólogo =

Peruvian politician (1952–2021)

Member of Congress
- In office 26 July 2011 – 26 July 2016
- Constituency: Áncash

Personal details
- Born: 12 July 1952 Virú, Peru
- Died: 17 January 2021 (aged 68) Nuevo Chimbote, Peru
- Party: Possible Peru
- Occupation: Politician

Víctor Walberto Crisólogo Espejo (12 July 1952 – 17 January 2021) was a Peruvian politician who served as a Congressman representing Ancash between 2011 and 2016. He died on 17 January 2021, of COVID-19 during the COVID-19 pandemic in Peru.

== Biography ==
He was born in Virú, capital of the homonymous province in the department of La Libertad, on July 12, 1952. He completed his primary studies in the district of Coishco, province of Santa, department of Áncash, and secondary studies in the city of Chimbote. Between 2005 and 2009, he studied law and political science at the Los Ángeles de Chimbote Catholic University, obtaining a law degree.

A member of the Peru Posible party since the early 2000s, he ran as a candidate for provincial mayor of Santa in the 2002 municipal elections, without success. Then he tempted his election as a congressman for Áncash in the 2006 general elections for the National Restoration party without obtaining the election. In the regional elections of 2006 he was a candidate for regional vice president of Áncash for the same party along with Jaime Roosewelt Minaya Castromonte, remaining in eleventh place with only 1.575% of the votes. In the general elections of 2011 he won his election as a congressman for Áncash again with the Peru Posible party. He obtained 12,352 preferential votes, resulting in a congressional election for the 2011-2016 period. He unsuccessfully attempted his election as a representative to the Andean Parliament in the 2016 general elections.
