= Santa, Peru =

Santa
- Location within Peru
- Coordinates: 8°59′17″S 78°36′51″W
- Country: Peru
- Region: Ancash
- Province: Santa
- District: Santa

Santa, founded as Santa María de la Parrilla, is a city on the north coast of Peru located on the left bank of Santa River, 2.6 km away of Pacific Ocean. It is the capital of Santa District in the homonymous province in the Ancash Region.

Towards 1527, there was an indigenous settlement named Saucha on the banks of the river, made up of houses built with reeds. On May 13, 1528, the Spanish expedition commander Francisco Pizarro arrived, leaving two Spaniards in place to recognize the place and learn the local language. In 1531, the Spaniards built a small chapel in Saucha, and later, they moved inland to what would be known as Pueblo Nuevo, the "Old Town" of Saucha. The Spanish foundation was officially ordered on August 2, 1556, by viceroy Andrés Hurtado de Mendoza, with the title of city of Santa María de la Parrilla.
