= Crisologo =

Crisologo is a Spanish surname and a given name derived from Greek Chrysologos, meaning "golden-worded". Notable people with the name include:

- Crisologo Abines (1947–2008), Filipino First Lieutenant
- Fabian Crisologo Ver (1920–1998), Filipino military officer
- Ferdinand Crisologo Ravena III (born 1996), Filipino basketball player
- Floro Crisologo (1908–1970), Filipino lawyer and politician
- José Crisologo Sorra (1929–2021), Filipino Roman Catholic bishop
- Kiefer Isaac Crisologo Ravena (born 1993), Filipino basketball player
- Luis Crisologo Singson (born 1941), Filipino businessman and politician
- Marcelino Crisólogo (1844–1927), Filipino politician, poet, writer and playwright
- Víctor Crisólogo (1952–2021), Peruvian politician
- Vincent Crisologo (born 1947), Filipino politician
