= Macate District =

Coordinates: 8°46′01″S 78°04′59″W

Macate
- District
- Location of Macate in the Santa province
- Country: Peru
- Region: Ancash
- Province: Santa
- Capital: Macate

Area
  - Total: 584.65 km^{2} (225.73 sq mi)
- Elevation: 2,712 m (8,898 ft)

Population (2005 census)
  - Total: 4,611
  - Density: 7.887/km^{2} (20.43/sq mi)
- Time zone: UTC-5 (PET)
- UBIGEO: 021804

For Macate District in Mozambique, see Macate District, Mozambique

Macate District is one of nine districts of the Santa Province in Peru.
