= Tanjungbalai (city) =

City in North Sumatra, Indonesia

- City
- City of Tanjungbalai; Kota Tanjungbalai

Other transcription(s)
  - Jawi: تنجوڠ بالاي
  - Chinese: 丹戎巴萊
  - Hokkien: tan jiông pa lâi
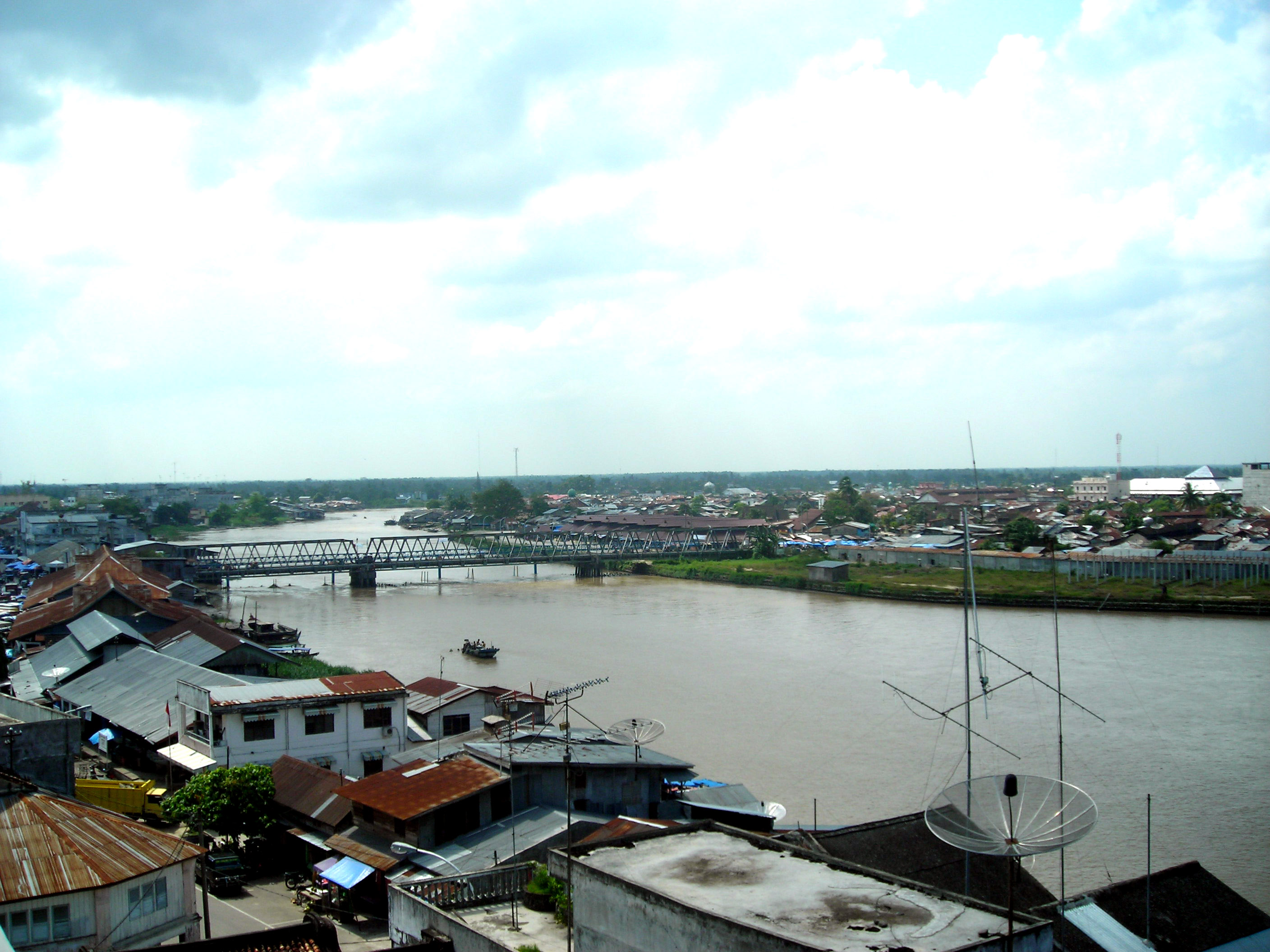
- Tanjungbalai city, 2008

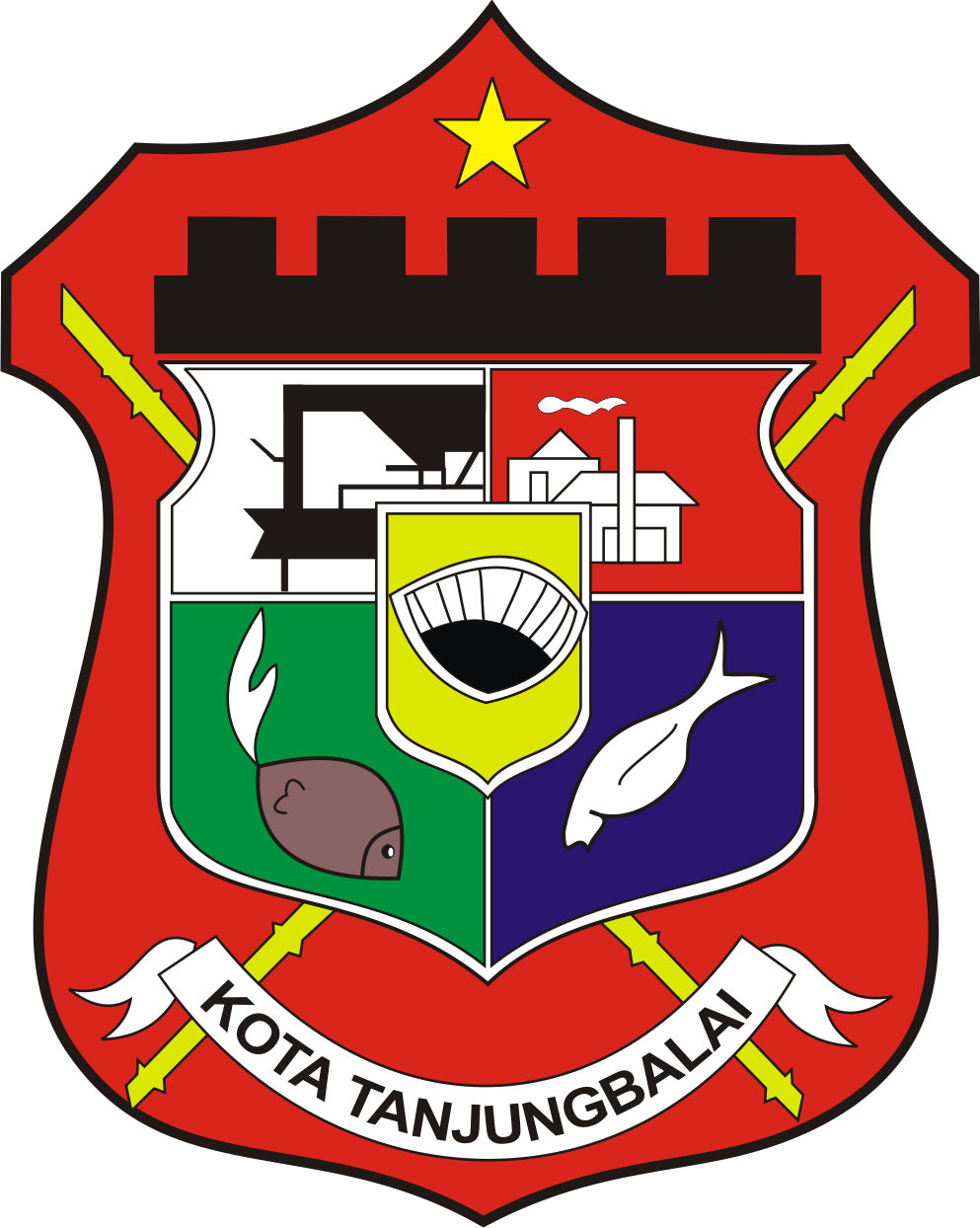
- Coat of arms
- Nickname: Kota Kerang (Scallops City)
- Location within North Sumatra

- Location in Sumatra and Indonesia Tanjungbalai (Indonesia)
- Coordinates: 2°58′12″N 99°48′0″E
- Country: Indonesia
- Province: North Sumatra

Government
  - Mayor: Mahyaruddin Salim
  - Vice Mayor: Fadly Abdina
  - Chairman of City's Council of Representatives: Tengku Eswin (Golkar)
  - Vice Chairmen of City's Council of Representatives: Surya Darma (PDI-P) and Syahrial Bakti (National Awakening Party)

Area
  - Total: 60.07 km^{2} (23.19 sq mi)

Population (mid 2025 estimate)
  - Total: 190,935
  - Density: 3,179/km^{2} (8,232/sq mi)
- Time zone: UTC+7 (Indonesia Western Time)
- Area code: (+62) 623
- Website: www.tanjungbalaikota.go.id

Tanjungbalai, (Note: The city's name is correctly and officially spelled as Tanjungbalai) also colloquially written as Tanjung Balai, is a city in North Sumatra province, Indonesia, on the estuary of the Asahan River. It has an area of 60.07 square kilometers (23.19 sq mi) and the sixth largest kota (urban) population in North Sumatra with 154,445 inhabitants in the 2010 census and 176,027 at the 2020 Census; the official estimate as of mid 2025 was 190,935 (comprising 96,903 males and 94,032 females). The town has a ferry terminal with services to Port Klang, Malaysia, and the city-island of Singapore.

Formerly known as Tanjungbalai-Asahan, this area was once a district within Asahan Regency until it was granted city status in 1984. However, the identifier "Asahan" is still used to distinguish it from the port town of the same name on Great Karimun island. After the separation of Tanjungbalai from Asahan Regency, it technically became an enclave within the regency.

== Administrative divisions ==
The city is divided administratively into six districts (kecamatan), tabulated below with their areas and their populations at the 2010 Census and 2020 Census, together with the official estimates as of mid 2025. The table also includes the number of administrative villages in each district (all classed as urban kelurahan) and its post codes.

Kode Wilayah	Name of District (kecamatan)	Area in km^{2}	Pop'n Census 2010	Pop'n Census 2020	Pop'n Census mid 2025	No. of kelurahan	Post codes
12.74.05	Datuk Bandar	22.21	33,797	41,544	44,254	5	21361, 21362, 21368, 21369
12.74.06	Datuk Bandar Timur (East Datuk Bandar)	14.73	26,942	30,492	33,789	5	21364 - 21367
12.74.01	Tanjungbalai Selatan (South Tanjungbalai)	1.77	19,330	19,277	20,017	6	21311 - 21316
12.74.02	Tanjungbalai Utara (North Tanjungbalai)	0.83	15,862	16,173	18,664	5	21321 - 21325
12.74.03	Sei Tualang Raso	9.22	22,712	27,283	29,009	5	21341 - 21345
12.74.04	Teluk Nibung (Nibung Bay)	11.31	35,802	41,258	45,202	5	21331 - 21335
	Totals	60.07	154,445	176,027	190,935	31	

== Tanjungbalai Asahan Port (Teluk Nibung Port) ==
The Port (which actually lies in Tanjungbalai District of Asahan Regency, between the city and the coast) has warehouse facilities and stacking fields. This port also carries out cargo and passenger services with activities mainly in exporting vegetables and fish to Malaysia. The port has passenger services to Port Klang and Port of Melintang Forest, Perak. Teluk Nibung passenger terminal currently has an area of about 2,500 square metres, consisting of two floors with a capacity of around 800 people. 1st floor for check-in, customs, immigration for arrivals, VIP rooms, quarantine rooms, and 2nd floor for immigration rooms for departures, passenger waiting rooms, food court, and coffee shops.

== Climate ==
Tanjungbalai has a tropical rainforest climate (Af) with moderate rainfall from January to July and heavy rainfall from August to December.

Climate data for Tanjungbalai
Month	Jan	Feb	Mar	Apr	May	Jun	Jul	Aug	Sep	Oct	Nov	Dec	Year
Mean daily maximum °C (°F)	31.2 (88.2)	31.6 (88.9)	32.0 (89.6)	31.9 (89.4)	32.2 (90.0)	32.1 (89.8)	31.8 (89.2)	31.6 (88.9)	31.2 (88.2)	31.0 (87.8)	30.6 (87.1)	30.8 (87.4)	31.5 (88.7)
Daily mean °C (°F)	26.4 (79.5)	26.6 (79.9)	27.0 (80.6)	27.1 (80.8)	27.5 (81.5)	27.3 (81.1)	26.9 (80.4)	26.9 (80.4)	26.7 (80.1)	26.7 (80.1)	26.3 (79.3)	26.4 (79.5)	26.8 (80.3)
Mean daily minimum °C (°F)	21.6 (70.9)	21.7 (71.1)	22.0 (71.6)	22.4 (72.3)	22.8 (73.0)	22.5 (72.5)	22.1 (71.8)	22.2 (72.0)	22.3 (72.1)	22.4 (72.3)	22.1 (71.8)	22.0 (71.6)	22.2 (71.9)
Average rainfall mm (inches)	129 (5.1)	89 (3.5)	102 (4.0)	120 (4.7)	128 (5.0)	120 (4.7)	121 (4.8)	168 (6.6)	213 (8.4)	271 (10.7)	219 (8.6)	183 (7.2)	1,863 (73.3)
Source: Climate-Data.org

== Gallery ==
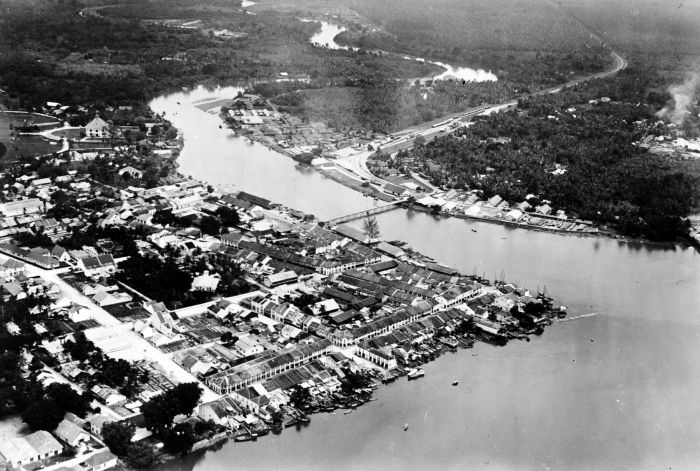
Tanjungbalai in 1895

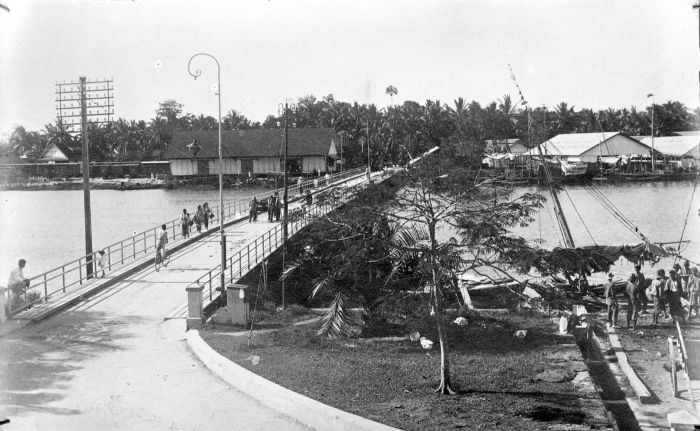
View of a bridge, 1926

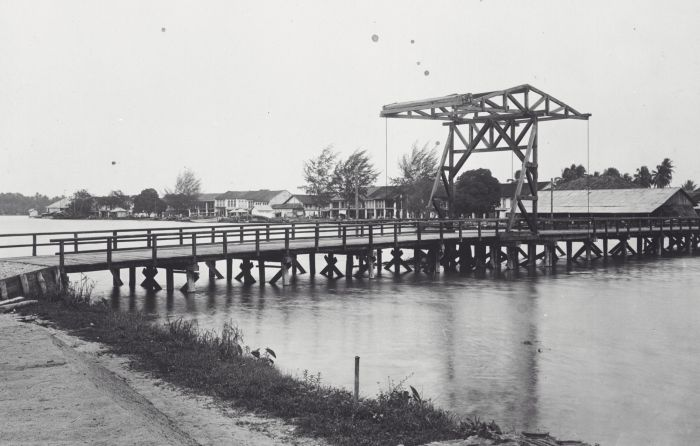
Bridge at Silau river, 1900s

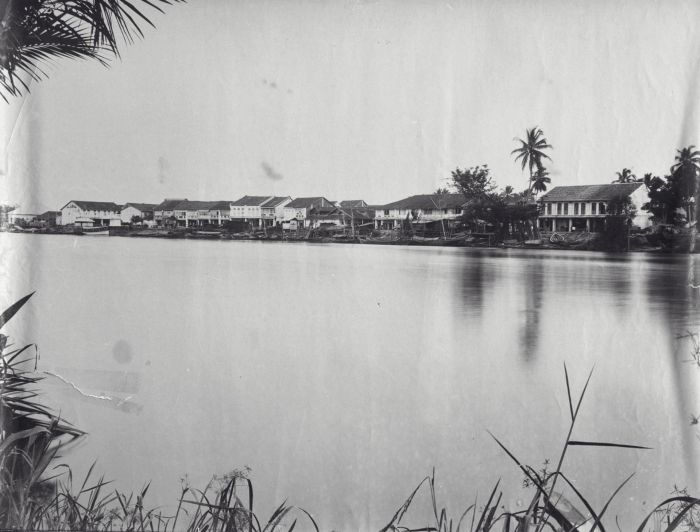
View of the city, 1895

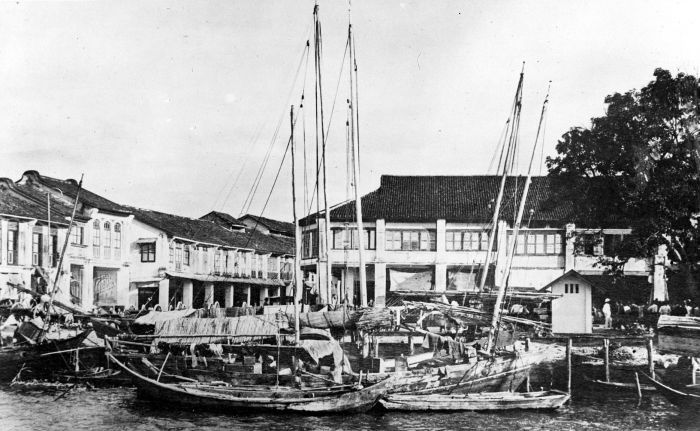
Fishing port in Tanjungbalai, 1900s

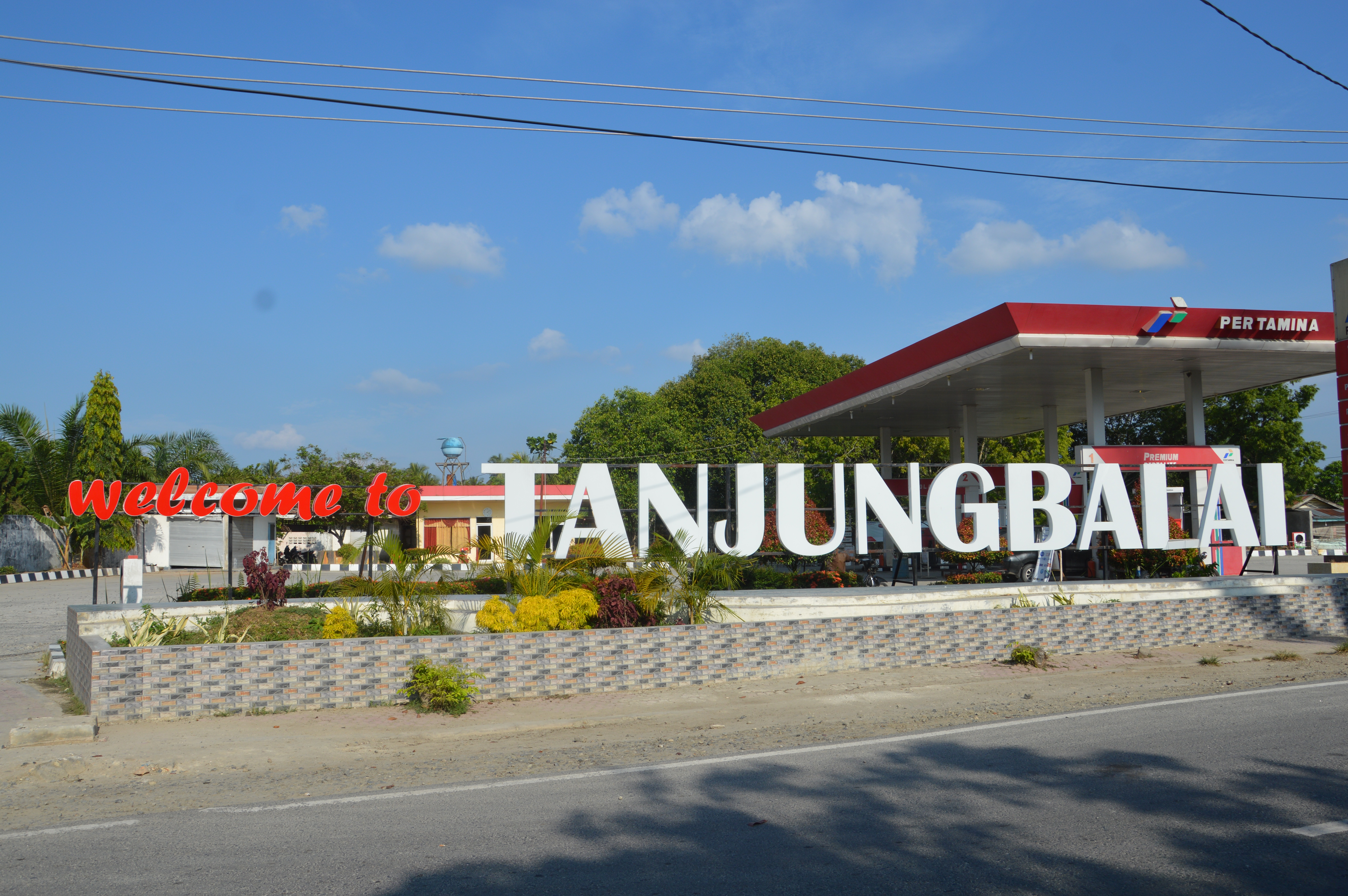
Welcome to Tanjungbalai signboard

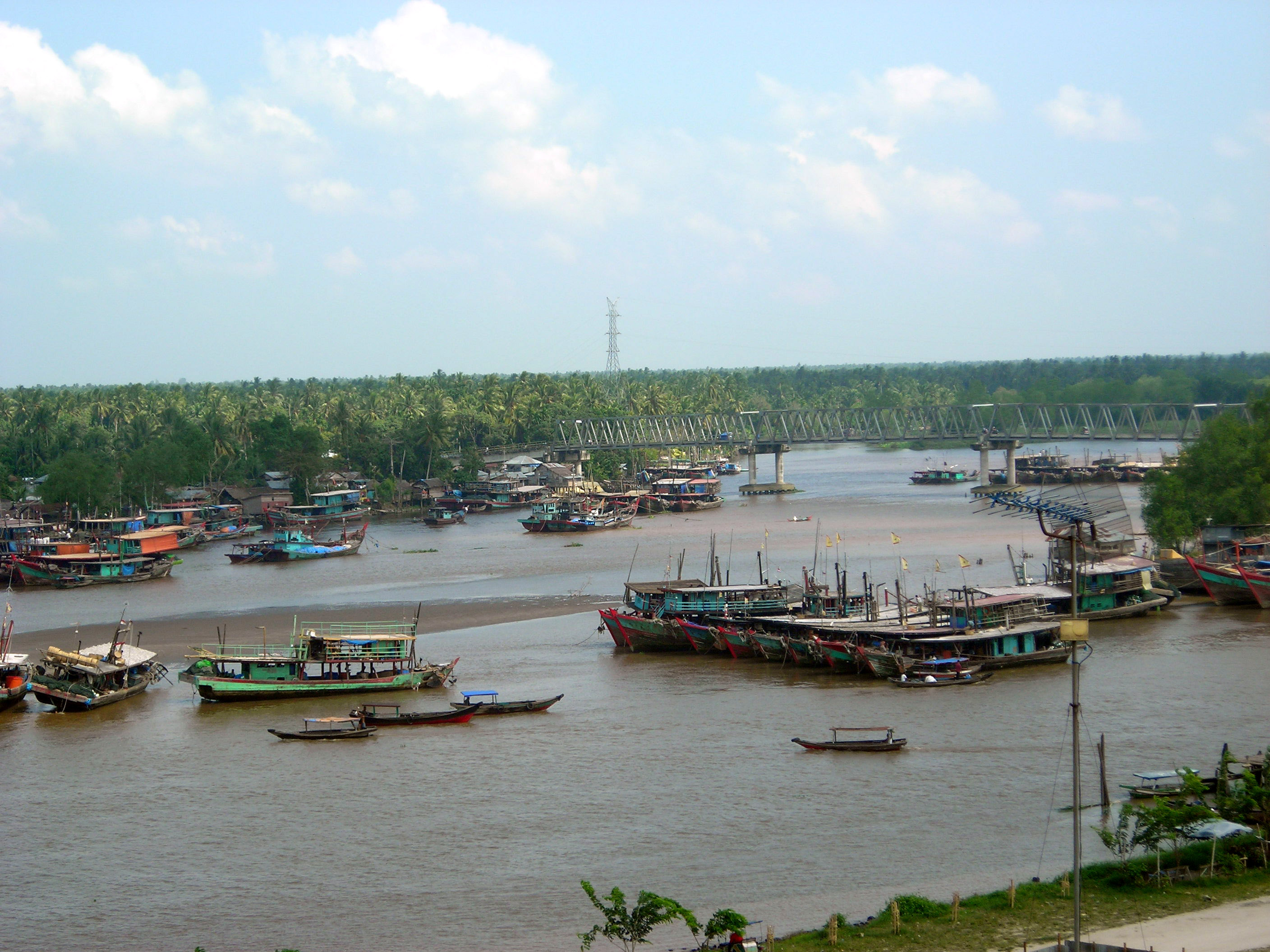
Sei Asahan Bridge

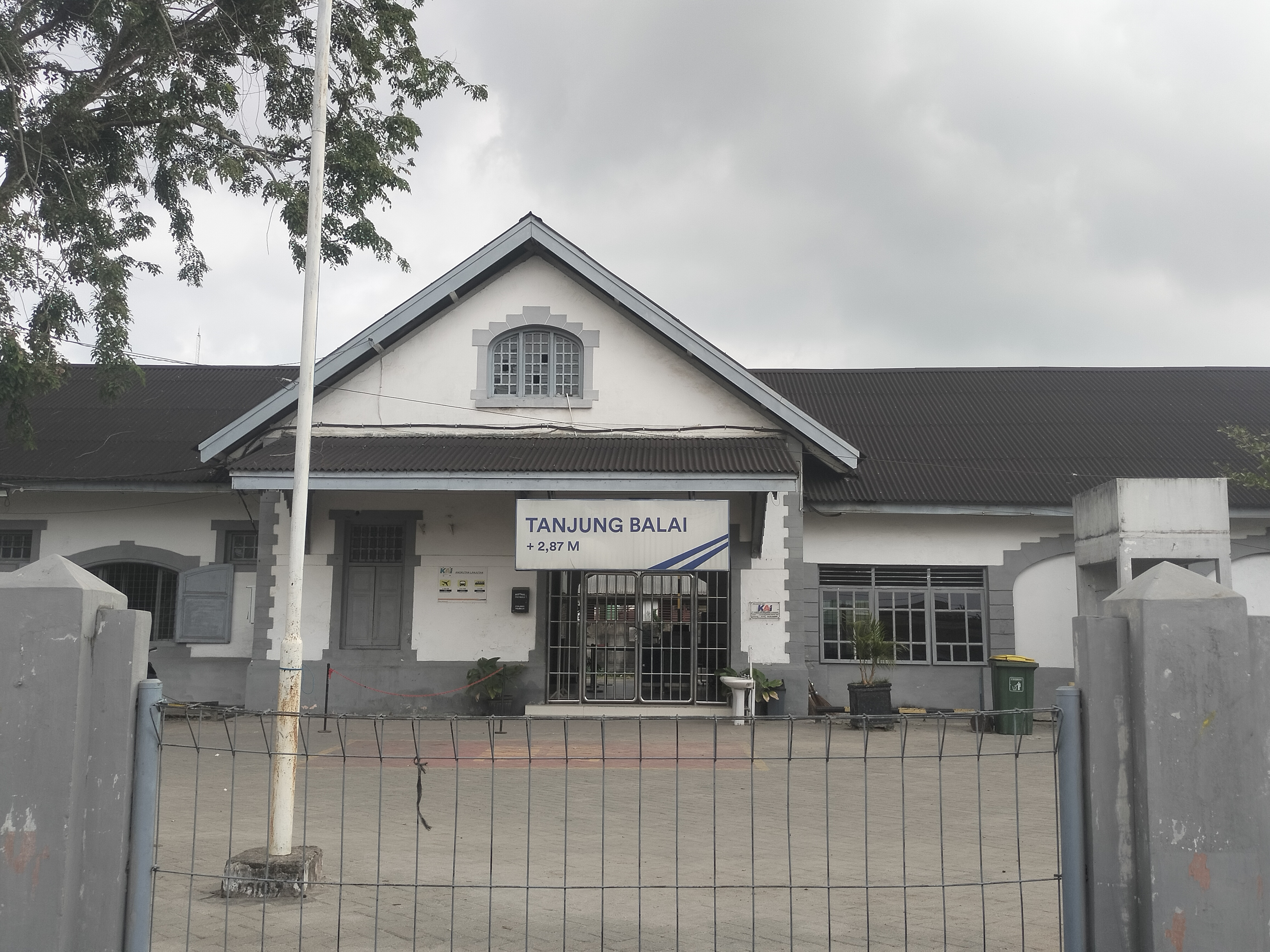
Tanjungbalai railway station

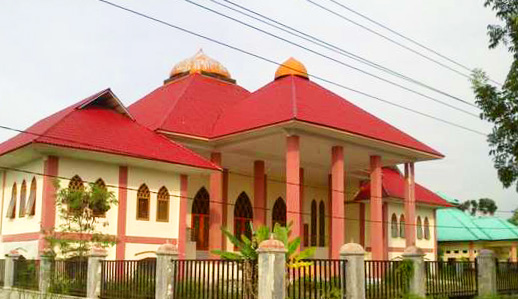
Replica of the former Sultan palace

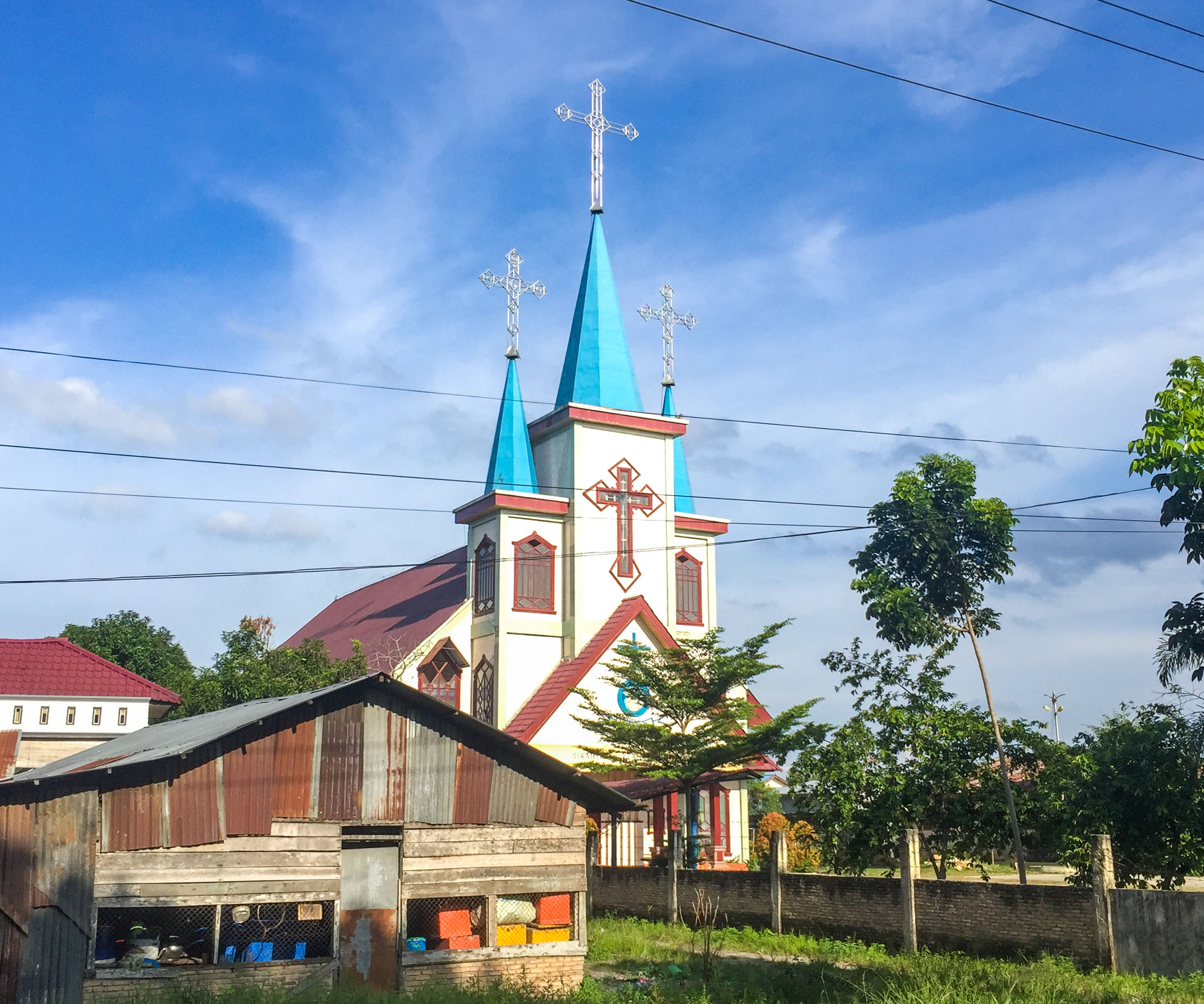
Sirantau Batak Protestant church

== Notes ==
1. The city's name is correctly and officially spelled as Tanjungbalai
