= Santa District =

Coordinates: 8°58′59″S 78°36′00″W

Santa
- District
- Location of Santa in the Santa province
- Country: Peru
- Region: Ancash
- Province: Santa
- Capital: Santa

Government
  - Mayor: Eugenio Jara Acosta

Area
  - Total: 42.23 km^{2} (16.31 sq mi)
- Elevation: 6 m (20 ft)

Population (2005 census)
  - Total: 17,428
  - Density: 412.7/km^{2} (1,069/sq mi)
- Time zone: UTC-5 (PET)
- UBIGEO: 021808

Santa District is one of nine districts of the province Santa in Peru.
