= Kundur Island =

Island within the Riau Archipelago, Indonesia

Kundur
Native name: Pulau Kundur
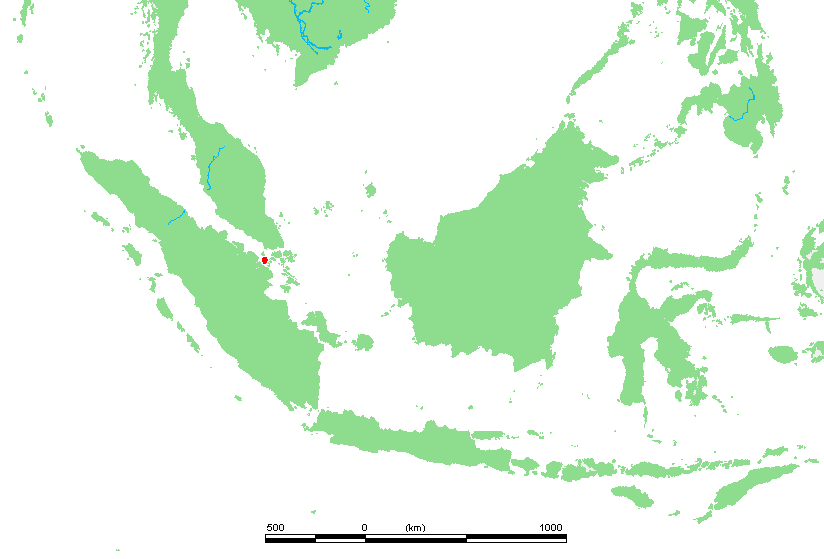

Geography
- Location: South East Asia
- Coordinates: 0°45′38″N 103°25′11″E
- Archipelago: Greater Sunda Islands

Administration
- Indonesia
- Province: Riau Islands Province

Kundur Island is an island within the Riau Archipelago, part of the Riau Islands Province of Indonesia. It lies at about 80 kilometres (50 miles) southwest of Singapore, 76 kilometres (47 mi) southwest of Batam, 32 kilometres (20 mi) south of Great Karimun Island, 172 kilometres (107 mi) northwest of the Lingga Islands and 120 kilometres (75 mi) west of Tanjung Pinang on Bintan Island. Kundur is actually the main island of an archipelago that has an area of about 795 square kilometres (307 sq mi), including the districts of Buru, Belat, Ungar and Selat Gelam with numerous minor surrounding islands.

The archipelago is separated from Great Karimun Island to the north by the Gelam Strait (Selat Gelam) and from the Moro Group of islands to the east by the Durian Stait (Selat Durian), although all these islands form parts of Karimun Regency. According to the 2010 Census population, the population of the islands was 67,090; the official estimate as at mid 2025 (including the adjacent smaller islands) was 91,295. As Kundur does not have an airport, all visitors arrive by ferry.

Most connections are with neighbouring islands, e.g. Tanjung Balai on Great Karimun Island, and mainland Sumatra. Direct ferry services to Singapore have been terminated because of decreasing profits, so travellers need to detour via Batam or Bintan.

== Towns and villages ==
There are seven districts covering the Kundur archipelago. Kundur Island comprises the districts of Kundur, Kundur Utara (North Kundur) and Kundur Barat (West Kundur). The smaller islands of the Kundur archipelago are comprised by the districts of Buru, Ungar, Belat and Selat Gelam (Gelam Strait); before 2018, the villages now constituting Selat Gelam District were part of Karimum District. The seven districts (kecamatan) comprise eight towns (kelurahan, identified by asterisks * in the table below) and 25 rural villages (desa), all listed below with their areas and their estimated populations as at mid 2025.

Kode Wilayah	Name of District	Name of town or village	Area in km^{2}	Pop'n Estimate mid 2025
21.02.02.1001	Kundur	West Tanjung Batu *	42.20	6,806
21.02.02.1002	Kundur	Tanjung Batu Kota *	17.00	12,202
21.02.02.2004	Kundur	Sungai Sebesi	23.00	3,755
21.02.02.2005	Kundur	Sungai Ungar	25.00	3,122
21.02.02.2006	Kundur	Lubuk	19.00	2,831
21.02.02.1009	Kundur	Gading Sari *	12.00	2,689
21.02.07.2003	North Kundur	North Sungai Ungar	28.50	2,372
21.02.07.2004	North Kundur	Teluk Radang	22.00	2,070
21.02.07.2010	North Kundur	Perayun	28.00	1,831
21.02.07.1012	North Kundur	Tanjung Berlian Kota *	37.90	4,112
21.02.07.2013	North Kundur	West Tanjung Berlian	33.00	2,688
21.02.08.1001	West Kundur	Sawang *	10.83	5,481
21.02.08.2002	West Kundur	South Sawang	36.93	3,856
21.02.08.2003	West Kundur	Sawamg Laut	29.82	3,135
21.02.08.2004	West Kundur	Kundur	34.15	3,719
21.02.08.2005	West Kundur	Gemuruh	9.37	3,226

Kode Wilayah	Name of District	Name of town or village	Area in km^{2}	Pop'n Estimate mid 2025
21.02.06.1001	Buru	Buru *	13.00	3,180
21.02.06.1002	Buru	Lubuk Puding *	9.16	3,579
21.02.06.2003	Buru	Tanjung Hutan	18.33	1,806
21.02.06.2004	Buru	Tanjung Batu Kecil	17.50	1,947
21.02.11.1001	Ungar	Alai *	19.79	2,651
21.02.11.2002	Ungar	Batu Limau	17.08	1,512
21.02.11.2003	Ungar	Ngal	8.15	683
21.02.11.2004	Ungar	Sungai Buluh	2.08	1,131
21.02.12.2001	Belat	Sebele	14.97	1,289
21.02.12.2002	Belat	Lebuh	7.64	1,244
21.02.12.2003	Belat	Penarah	26.00	1,471
21.02.12.2004	Belat	Sungai Asam	17.31	1,352
21.02.12.2005	Belat	Tebias	9.20	856
21.02.12.2006	Belat	Degong	9.89	544
21.02.12.2001	Selat Gelam	Parit	36.36	1,704
21.02.12.2002	Selat Gelam	Tulang	151.52	1,435
21.02.12.2003	Selat Gelam	Selat Mendaun	8.15	1,016
	Totals		794.83	91,295

== Geography ==
Pulau Kundur (Kundur Island itself) is the principal and most populated part of the archipelago. To the southeast are situated Pulau Ungar and Pulau Mandah, with the smaller Pulau Ngal and Pulau Perapos to their east. Pulau Panjang lies to the east of Kundur. To the northeast of Kundur are situated Pulau Belat, Pulau Degong and Pulau Tabias; further north are Pulau Papan and Pulau Buru, while further north still are Pulau Parit, Pulau Tulang and Pulau Lumut, all separated by the Gelam Strait from Great Karimun (and its outliers) even further north.

=== Tanjung Batu ===
The biggest town on Kundur Island, Tanjung Batu is marked as the district centre (kota kecamatan) of the island. It is located at the southern tip of the island, and is the hub for most ferry businesses.

It is the town with most number of businesses and trading companies. It is also a popular starting/finishing point for cycling trips as well.

Its commercial street is Jalan Merdeka, just a stone's throw away from the port, but most of the shops are lined on the side of Jalan Kartini and Jalan Jendral Sudirman. Jalan Usman Harun is a temple street where it locates the Vihara Dharma Shanti which is a Buddhist temple. North to the end of Jalan J. Sudirman is a housing area called Batu Dua. Vehicles used in this towns include angkuts and ojeks.

=== Urung ===
Another town in the district of North Kundur (Kundur Utara). It is just a bit smaller than Tanjung Batu, and is also another popular starting/finishing point for cycling trips.

=== Selat Belia ===
A third town at the northern tip of Kundur Island. It means "straits of youth" in Bahasa Indonesia.

=== Sungai Ungar ===
A village on the south-east zone of Kundur Island.

=== Sawang ===
A town located in the district of West Kundur (Kundur Barat). It is the town where the biggest hotel in Kundur Island, Hotel Taman Gembira, is located.
