= Lacramarca River =

River in Peru

Quebrada La Cramarca Lacramrca River
- Location of mouth

Location
- Country: Peru
- Province: Santa Province
- Region: Ancash Region

Physical characteristics
- Mouth
  - location: Pacific Ocean
  - coordinates: 8°53′12″S 78°18′57″W -->

Lacramarca River (Spanish: Río Lacramarca, Quebrada Lacramarca) is an intermittent stream that flows through the Santa Province of Peru to the Pacific Ocean.

Other coordinates: 9°05′S 78°36′W

== See also ==
- List of rivers of Peru
- List of rivers of the Americas by coastline
