= Isla Blanca (Santa) =

Island in Peru

Blanca Island
Isla Blanca (Spanish)
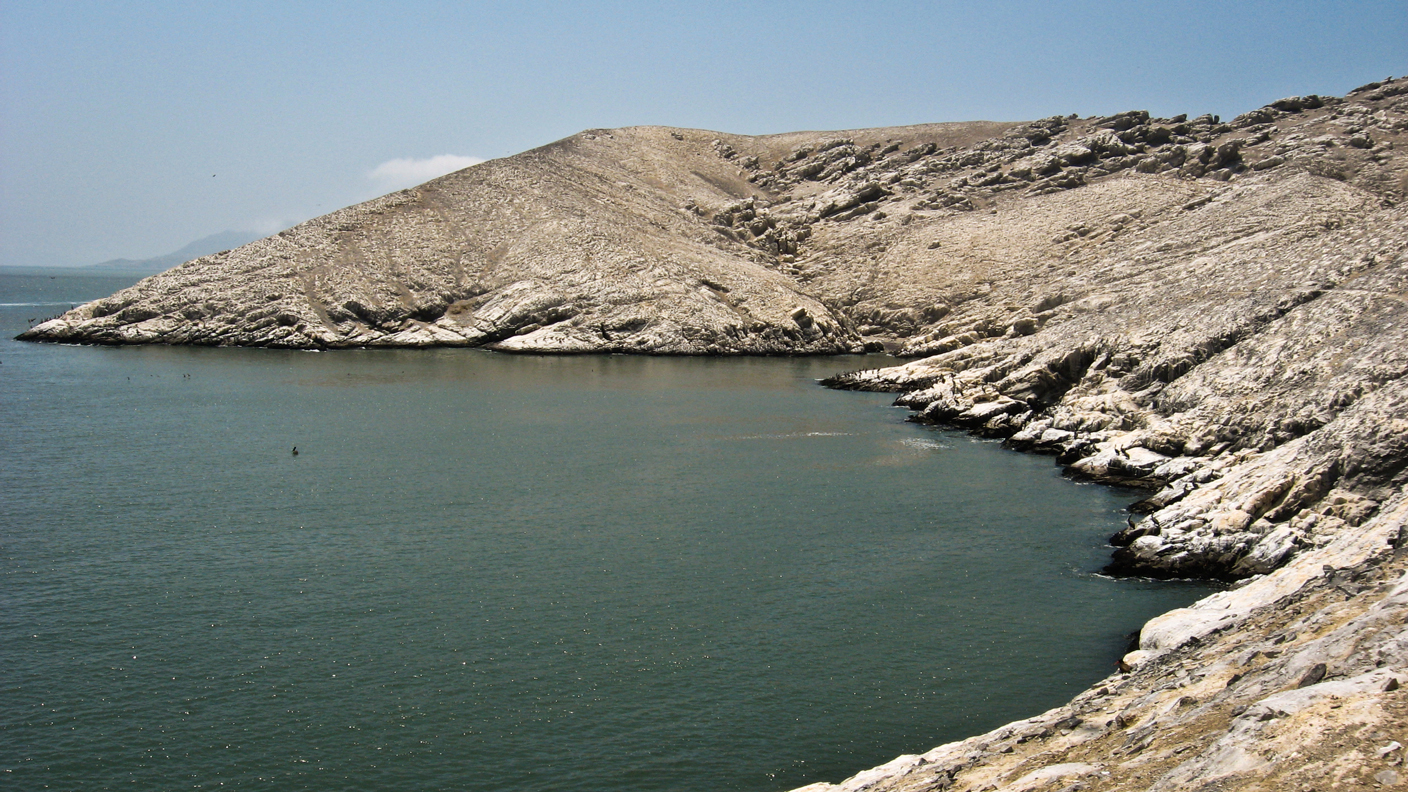
- Blanca Island

- Location within Peru

Geography
- Location: Pacific Ocean
- Coordinates: 9°6′18.0″S 78°37′18.0″W

Administration
- Peru
- Region: Ancash
- Province: Santa

Additional information
- Time zone: PET (UTC-5)

Isla Blanca or Blanca Island is a volcanic island located at the mouth of Chimbote Bay, near Chimbote, Peru. Administratively it is in Chimbote District, Santa Province, Ancash Region. The island is approximately 3200 m long and 920 m wide. It rises to an altitude of 204 m. Its relief is very rough and rocky. The contours are very steep, especially on the west side of the island. The island is white in appearance due to the deposition of guano by seabirds.

== Reserve ==
This island is an ecological and tourist reserve formed by mountains largely devoid of vegetation. It is the largest of the islands in El Ferrol Bay (Chimbote Bay) and is located northwest of the city of Chimbote, about 5 km from the coast. It preserves a guano island, the lítico forest, the fauna of the island, coves, and defiles.

The island has no human population. It serves as a refuge to some guaneras birds such as pelicans and gulls. When taking refuge these guaneras birds in this place the birds carry ticks. There are also small lizards on the island that feed on the ticks. Sea lions can be found in the surroundings of the island. The island's beaches are home to different types of shells and small animals, such as seashells, clams, mussels, crabs and snails.
