= Tanjung Balai Karimun =

- Town

Other transcription(s)
  - Jawi: تنجوڠ بالاي-كريماون
  - Chinese: 丹戎巴來卡里汶
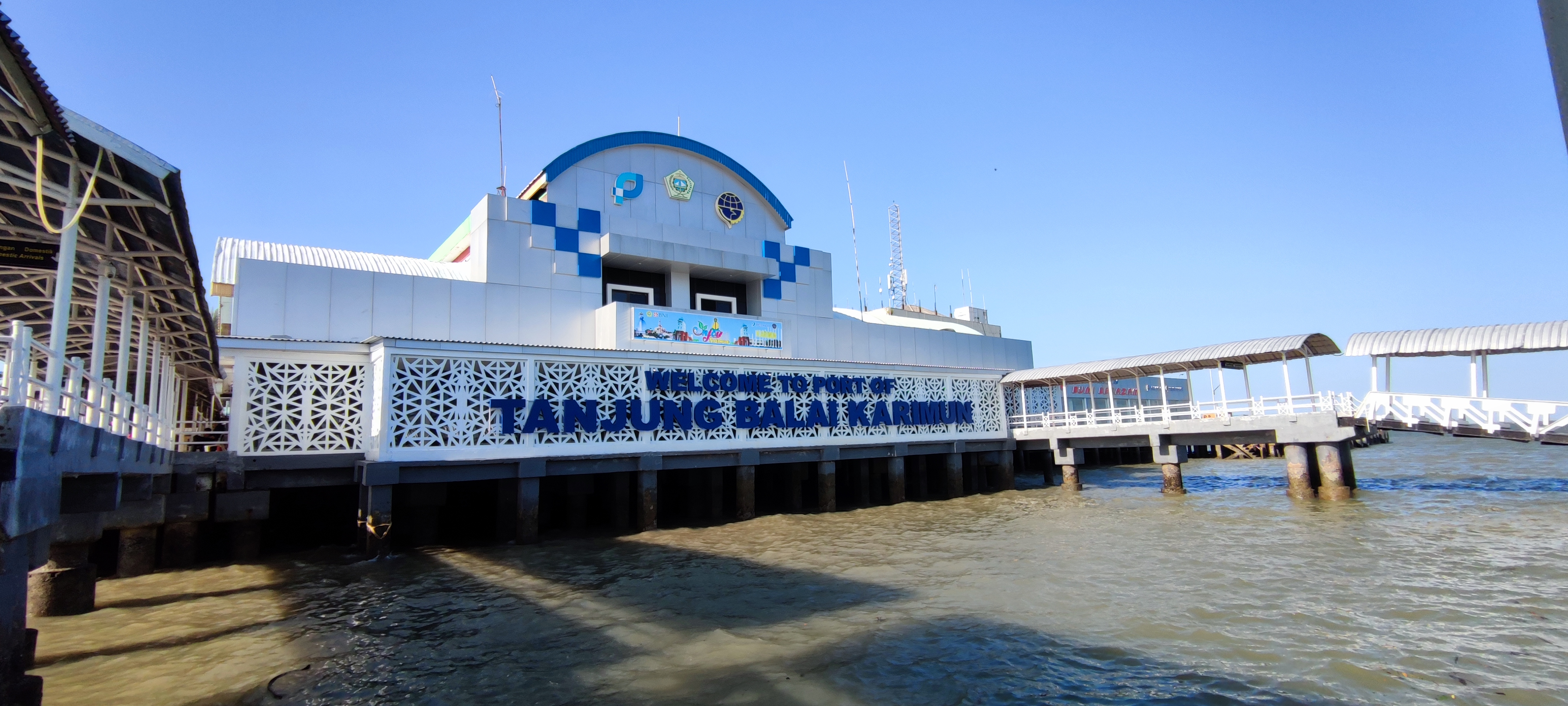
- Port of Tanjung Balai Karimun

- Location in Sumatra and Indonesia Tanjung Balai Karimun (Indonesia)
- Coordinates: 01°00′00″N 103°25′18″E
- Country: Indonesia
- Province: Riau Islands
- Regency: Karimun Regency

Area
  - Total: 17.73 km^{2} (6.85 sq mi)

Population (2020 Census)
  - Total: 48,953
  - Density: 2,761/km^{2} (7,151/sq mi)
- Time zone: UTC+7 (Indonesia Western Time)
- Area code: (+62) 777

Tanjung Balai Karimun (Jawi: تنجوڠ بالاي-كريماون, simplified Chinese: 丹戎巴來卡里汶; traditional Chinese: 丹戎巴萊卡里汶) often abbreviated to Tg. Balai, is the main town at the southern end of the Great Karimun Island (Pulau Karimunbesar), part of the Karimun Regency within the Riau Islands Province of Indonesia. The town forms a conurbation with the adjoining community of Meral to its west. It is often called Tanjung Balai Karimun to distinguish it from the city of the same name, situated in the Asahan Regency.

== Transport ==
It has a port by the same name that has services to Sumatran port/city of Dumai, crossing the Strait of Malacca as well as to Singapore crossing the Straits of Singapore.

The city is served by Sei Bati Airport, which has regular flights to and from Pekanbaru three times weekly, Port of Tanjung Balai which has regular ferries to and from overseas such as Singapore, Malaysia, etc., and Rakyat Sri Tanjung Gelam Karimun harbour, which serve domestic route.

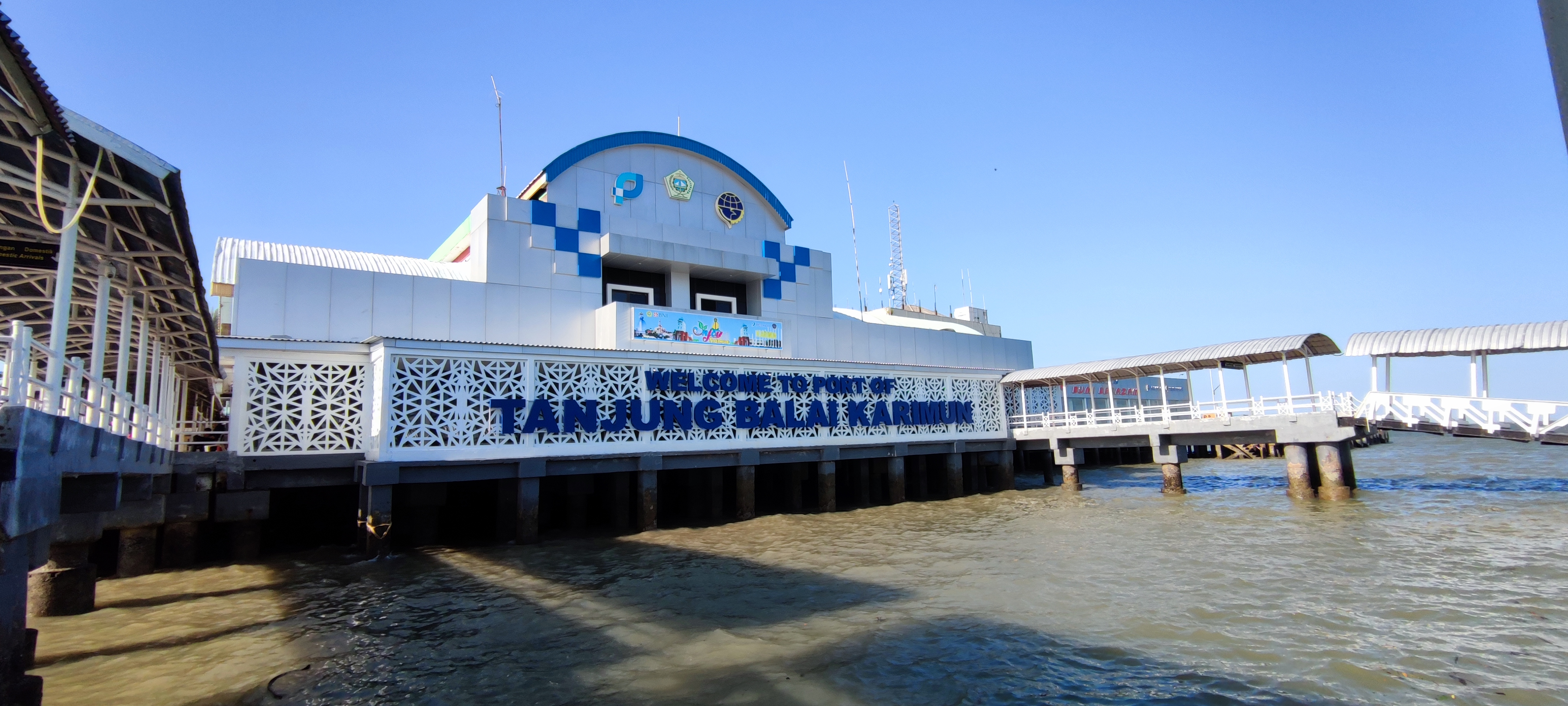
Picture of Port of Tanjung Balai Karimun

== Climate ==
Tanjung Balai Karimun has a tropical rainforest climate (Af) with heavy rainfall year-round.

Climate data for Tanjung Balai Karimun
Month	Jan	Feb	Mar	Apr	May	Jun	Jul	Aug	Sep	Oct	Nov	Dec	Year
Mean daily maximum °C (°F)	30.3 (86.5)	30.9 (87.6)	31.2 (88.2)	31.3 (88.3)	31.3 (88.3)	31.2 (88.2)	31.0 (87.8)	30.9 (87.6)	30.9 (87.6)	31.0 (87.8)	30.6 (87.1)	30.3 (86.5)	30.9 (87.6)
Daily mean °C (°F)	26.0 (78.8)	26.4 (79.5)	26.6 (79.9)	26.9 (80.4)	26.9 (80.4)	26.9 (80.4)	26.6 (79.9)	26.5 (79.7)	26.5 (79.7)	26.6 (79.9)	26.3 (79.3)	26.1 (79.0)	26.5 (79.7)
Mean daily minimum °C (°F)	21.7 (71.1)	21.9 (71.4)	22.1 (71.8)	22.5 (72.5)	22.6 (72.7)	22.6 (72.7)	22.3 (72.1)	22.2 (72.0)	22.2 (72.0)	22.2 (72.0)	22.1 (71.8)	21.9 (71.4)	22.2 (72.0)
Average rainfall mm (inches)	176 (6.9)	121 (4.8)	158 (6.2)	211 (8.3)	189 (7.4)	163 (6.4)	156 (6.1)	178 (7.0)	195 (7.7)	231 (9.1)	251 (9.9)	214 (8.4)	2,243 (88.2)
Source: Climate-Data.org
