= Matapalo Island =

Island located in the region of Tumbes, Peru

Isla Matapalo (Spanish)
- Location within Peru

Geography
- Location: Pacific Ocean
- Coordinates: 3°26′7.34″S 80°15′27.45″W
- Area: 6.08 km^{2} (2.35 sq mi)

Administration
- Peru
- Region: Tumbes

Additional information
- Time zone: PET (UTC-5)

Matapalo Island is an island located in the region of Tumbes, Peru in the Pacific Ocean. It is separated from the mainland by a strait 198 – 273 m wide, in east-west orientation. With a total area of 6.08 km^{2}, it is the biggest of the Peruvian islands in the Gulf of Guayaquil.

Vegetation present in the island consists of mangrove forests, dry tropical forests and grasslands.
