= Moro District, Riau Islands =

District in Karimun Regency, Riau Islands Province, Indonesia

Moro District is an administrative district (kecamatan) within Karimun Regency (kabupaten), part of the Riau Islands Province of Indonesia. It was one of the three original districts of the regency, and encompassed 86 islands in the east of the regency, of which the largest (from west to east) are Moro (or Sugibawah) Island, Sugi Besar Island and Citlim (or Combol) Island; however, in 2022 seven of the villages (desa) on Sugi Besar and Citlim islands were cut out of the district to form a new district of Sugie Besar. The district now comprises the two urban villages (kelurahan) of Moro and Moro Timur, plus three rural villages (desa).

| Kode Wilayah | Name of Kelurahan or desa | Area in km^{2} | Pop'n Estimate mid 2023 |
|---|---|---|---|
| 21.02.01.1003 | Moro | 7.52 | 3,981 |
| 21.02.01.1010 | Moro Timur (East Moro) | 5.41 | 3,233 |
| 21.02.01.2014 | Pulau Moro (Moro Island) | 12.45 | 917 |
| 21.02.01.2004 | Pauh | 10.56 | 1,298 |
| 21.02.01.2009 | Jang | 14.22 | 2,002 |
| Sub-totals | Moro District | 50.16 | 11,431 |
| 21.02.14.2001 | Sugie | 49.14 | 1,611 |
| 21.02.14.2003 | Keban | 6.79 | 1,289 |
| 21.02.14.2007 | Selat Mie | 35.22 | 1,490 |
| 21.02.14.2005 | Tanjung Pelanduk | 39.00 | 789 |
| 21.02.14.2002 | Niur Permai | 21.70 | 1,181 |
| 21.02.14.2004 | Rawa Jaya | 7.00 | 919 |
| 21.02.14.2006 | Buluh Patah | 16.22 | 938 |
| Sub-totals | Sugie Besar District | 175.07 | 7,967 |

Of the villages on Moro District, Moro, East Moro, Moro Island and Pauh are situated on Moro Island, while Jang is situated on Durian Island to the south. Of the 7 villages in Sugie Besar District, Sugi, Keban, Niur Permai and Rawa Jaya are situated on Sugi Besar Island, while Selat Mie, Tanjung Pelanduk and Buluh Patah are situated on Citlim Island.
