= Coishco District =

Coordinates: 9°01′23″S 78°36′56″W

Coishco
- District
- Location of Coishco in the Santa province
- Country: Peru
- Region: Ancash
- Province: Santa
- Founded: December 13, 1988
- Capital: Coishco

Area
  - Total: 9.21 km^{2} (3.56 sq mi)
- Elevation: 15 m (49 ft)

Population (2005 census)
  - Total: 15,036
  - Density: 1,630/km^{2} (4,230/sq mi)
- Time zone: UTC-5 (PET)
- UBIGEO: 021803

Coishco District is one of nine districts of the Santa Province in Peru.
