= Great Karimun =

Island in Indonesia

Native name: Karimun Besar
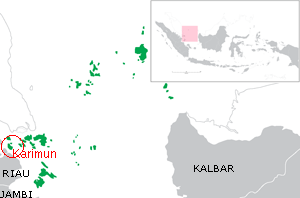
- Great Karimun in Riau Islands

Geography
- Location: Singapore Strait (east); Strait of Malacca (north)
- Coordinates: 1°03′N 103°22′E
- Archipelago: Riau Archipelago

Administration
- Indonesia
- Province: Riau Islands
- Regency: Karimun Regency
- Largest settlement: Tanjung Balai (pop. 159,373)

Demographics
- Ethnic groups: Riau Malays

Additional information
- Time zone: Western Indonesia Time (UTC+7)

Great Karimun (Indonesian: Karimun Besar), also known as Mawas Island, is one of the islands in the Riau Islands province of Indonesia, administratively part of Karimun Regency. It lies about 37 km southwest of Singapore, 54 km west of Batam, 24 km northeast of Rangsang Island and 32 km north of Kundur Island.

== History ==
In the past, Great Karimun Island was the destination of foreign traders and the Malay Kings. Sixteenth-century Portuguese reports claimed that the island was inhabited, possibly by the Orang Laut. In the 18th and 19th centuries, the island was part of the Johor Sultanate then the Riau-Lingga Sultanate.

Around 1615, agents of the Dutch East India Company (VOC) inspected the northwestern coast of the island for the possible construction of a fortification. The proposed fort, however, was never built. Two centuries later, Colonel William Farquhar surveyed the island after receiving permission from the Bugis Raja Muda of Johor, Raja Ja'afar. Although Karimun was deemed to be of great strategic value at the confluence of the Singapore and Melaka Straits, it was found to have insufficient sources of fresh water, rocky land, and inhospitable harbour which were unsuitable to sustain a British trading post and a settlement.

== Geography ==
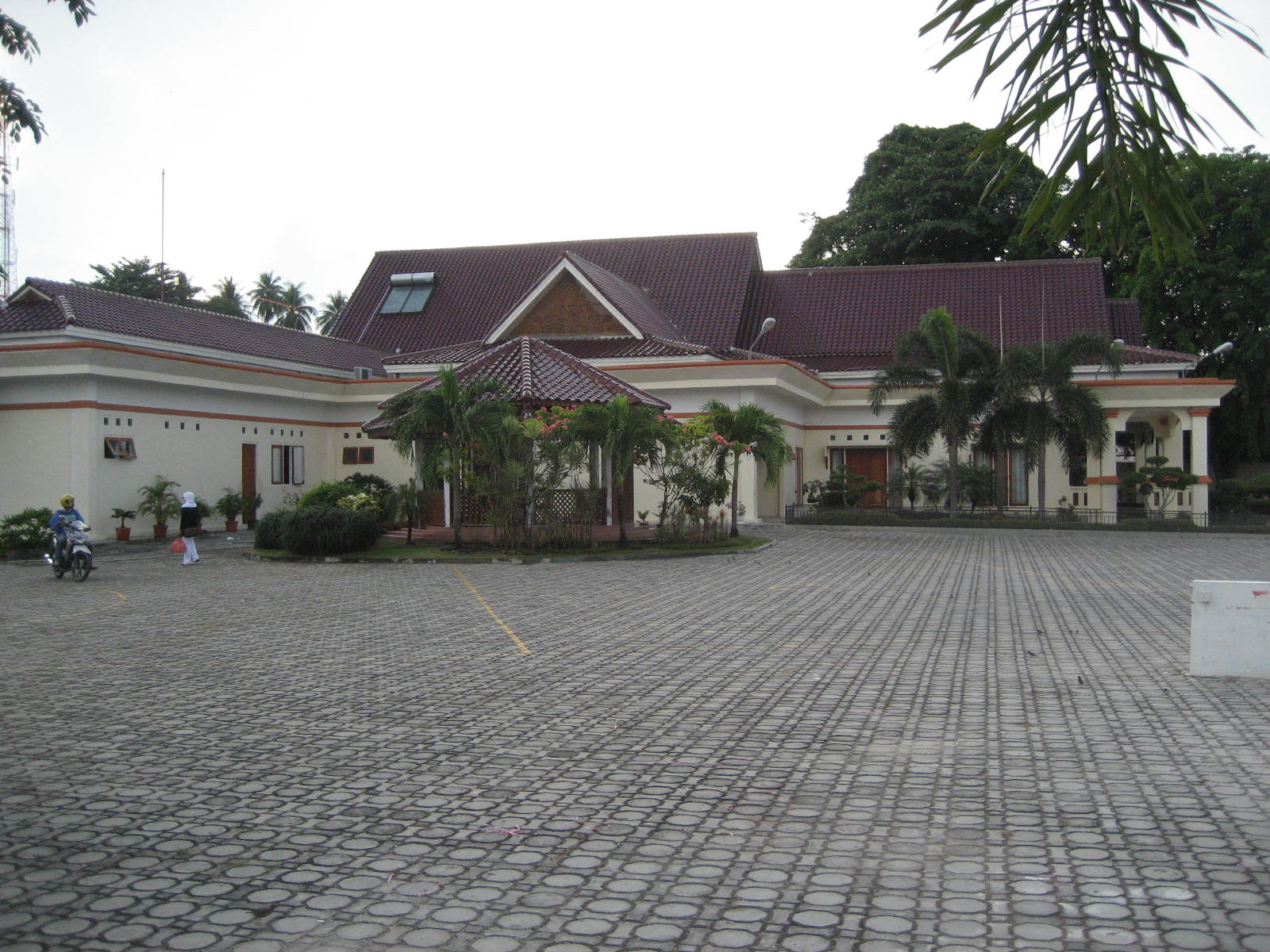
Government office in Tanjung Balai city

The island's main town is Tanjung Balai Karimun, usually just called Karimun, situated at the southern end of the island. As at the 2020 Census, the regency of Karimun had a population of 253,457 with the majority (about 60%) of the people living on Great Karimun and its adjacent small islands; the official estimate as at mid 2025 was 276,650; of these, 159,373 lived on Great Karimun Island (including Little Karimun Island to the northeast, Asan Island to the northwest, and other surrounding small islands) in mid 2025. The great majority of the population live in the south of the island, notably in the highly urbanized districts of Karimun and Meral, but there are significant industrial developments all along the west coast of the island, including an oil terminal and a shipyard. Notable landmarks on the island include Mount Jantan, the beaches of Pelawan, Ketam and Pongkar, and the Pongkar Waterfall.

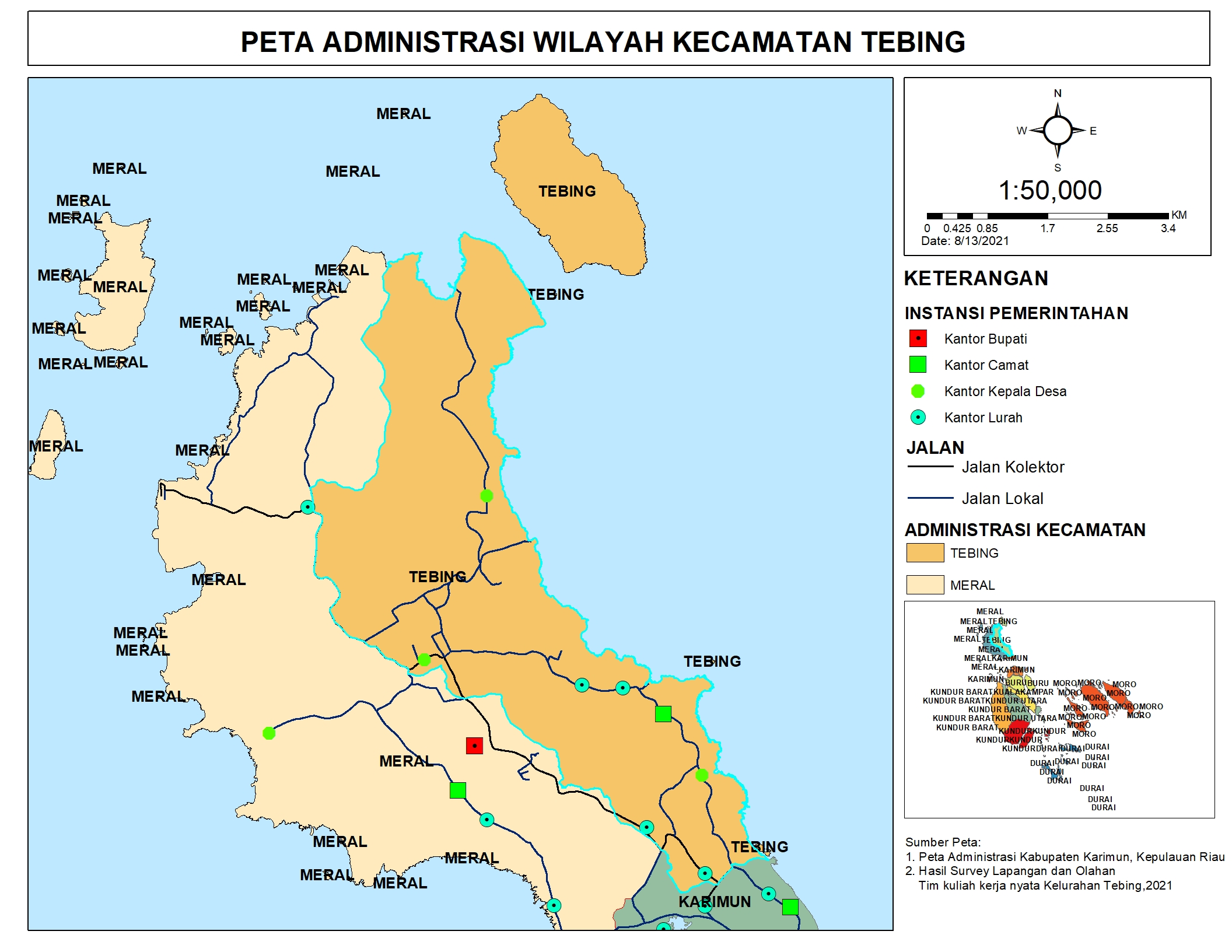
districts in Karimun regency

The island (including its offshore islands) is divided into four districts (kecamatan) - Karimun, Meral, Tebing and Meral Barat (West Meral, or Teluk Senang). They are sub-divided into nineteen urban (kelurahan) and three rural (desa) villages.

| Kode Wilayah | Name of Kelurahan or desa | Area in km^{2} | Pop'n Estimate mid 2025 |
|---|---|---|---|
| 21.02.03.1001 | Tanjung Balai | 0.91 | 7,396 |
| 21.02.03.1002 | Teluk Air | 11.12 | 6,572 |
| 21.02.03.1003 | Sungai Lakam Timur | 1.42 | 9,973 |
| 21.02.03.1006 | Lubuk Semut | 1.48 | 6,344 |
| 21.02.03.1007 | Tanjung Balai Kota | 0.67 | 6,081 |
| 21.02.03.1008 | Sungai Lakam Barat | 1.24 | 11,566 |
| Sub-totals | Karimun District | 16.84 | 47,932 |
| 21.02.04.1001 | Meral Kota | 0.76 | 7,481 |
| 21.02.04.1002 | Baran Barat | 1.77 | 10,243 |
| 21.02.04.1003 | Sungai Raya | 5.50 | 8,173 |
| 21.02.04.1007 | Sungai Pasir | 5.98 | 9,898 |
| 21.02.04.1006 | Baran Timur | 1.89 | 12,779 |
| 21.02.04.1008 | Parit Benut | 9.67 | 6,921 |
| Sub-totals | Meral District ^{(a)} | 25.57 | 55,495 |
| 21.02.05.1001 | Tebing | 4.24 | 9,288 |
| 21.02.05.1002 | Teluk Uma | 2.38 | 6,839 |
| 21.02.05.1003 | Kapling | 1.42 | 5,785 |
| 21.02.05.1004 | Pamak | 7.04 | 5,694 |
| 21.02.05.1008 | Harjosari | 4.54 | 6,714 |
| 21.02.05.2007 | Pongkar (desa) ^{(b)} | 33.14 | 3,543 |
| Sub-totals | Tebing District | 52.76 | 37,863 |
| 21.02.10.1001 | Pasir Panjang ^{(c)} | 6.97 | 5,341 |
| 21.02.10.2003 | Pangke (desa) | 6.75 | 4,205 |
| 21.02.10.1002 | Darusalam | 28.73 | 5,194 |
| 21.02.10.2004 | Pangke Barat (desa) | 11.80 | 3,343 |
| Sub-totals | Meral Barat District | 54.25 | 18,083 |
| Totals | Karimun Island | 149.42 | 159,373 |

Notes: (a) includes the small island of Pulau Merak off the south coast of Meral, with Pulau Babi further south, and Pulau Tambelas to the west.
(b) the most northerly and rural part of the district includes offshore Little Karimun Island to the northeast of the main island.
(c) the most northerly part of the district includes offshore Asan Island to the northwest of the main island.

== Economics ==
The island has strategic geographical importance, as it is near the Straits of Malacca, an international shipping route. As the island is strategically located at the border of Singapore and Johor (in Malaysia), Karimun being a part of the Riau Islands is also included in the SIJORI Growth Triangle partnership. SIJORI (Singapore-Johor-Riau Islands) Growth Triangle is a strategic partnership among Singapore, Johor and the Riau Islands that combines the individual and collective strength to improve the subregion's attractiveness to investors from both the region and internationally. SIJORI links the infrastructure, capital, expertise and rich culture of Singapore with the natural resources, lands and labour resources of Johor and the Riau Islands.

However, due to the stronger ties between Singapore and Malaysia, Karimun is losing its economic attraction to Singaporean investments. Another reason for the loss in attractiveness is the lack of adequate infrastructure in Karimun, especially the electricity supply and the lack of transparency in the government administration.

== Natural resources ==
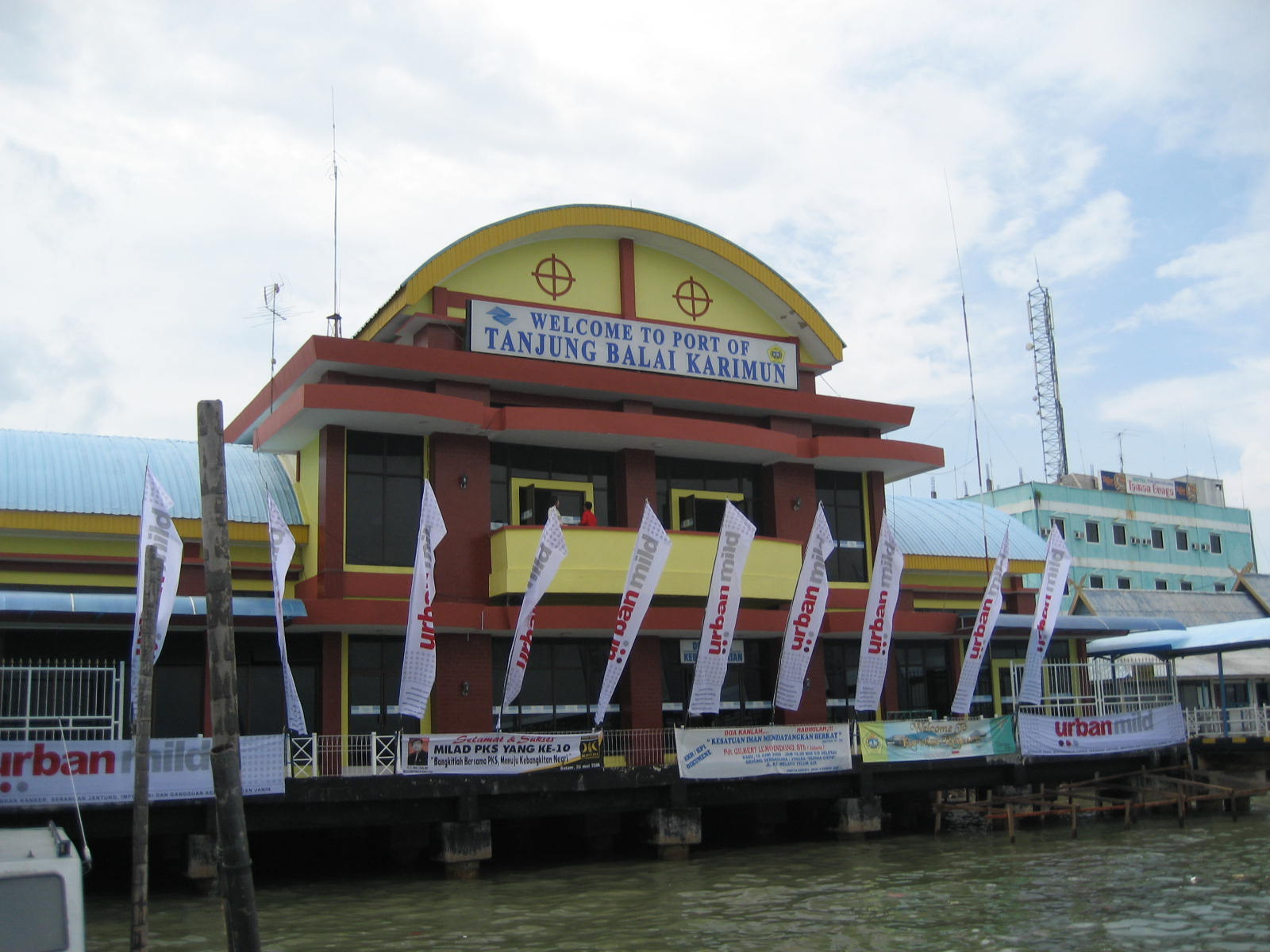
Tanjung Balai port

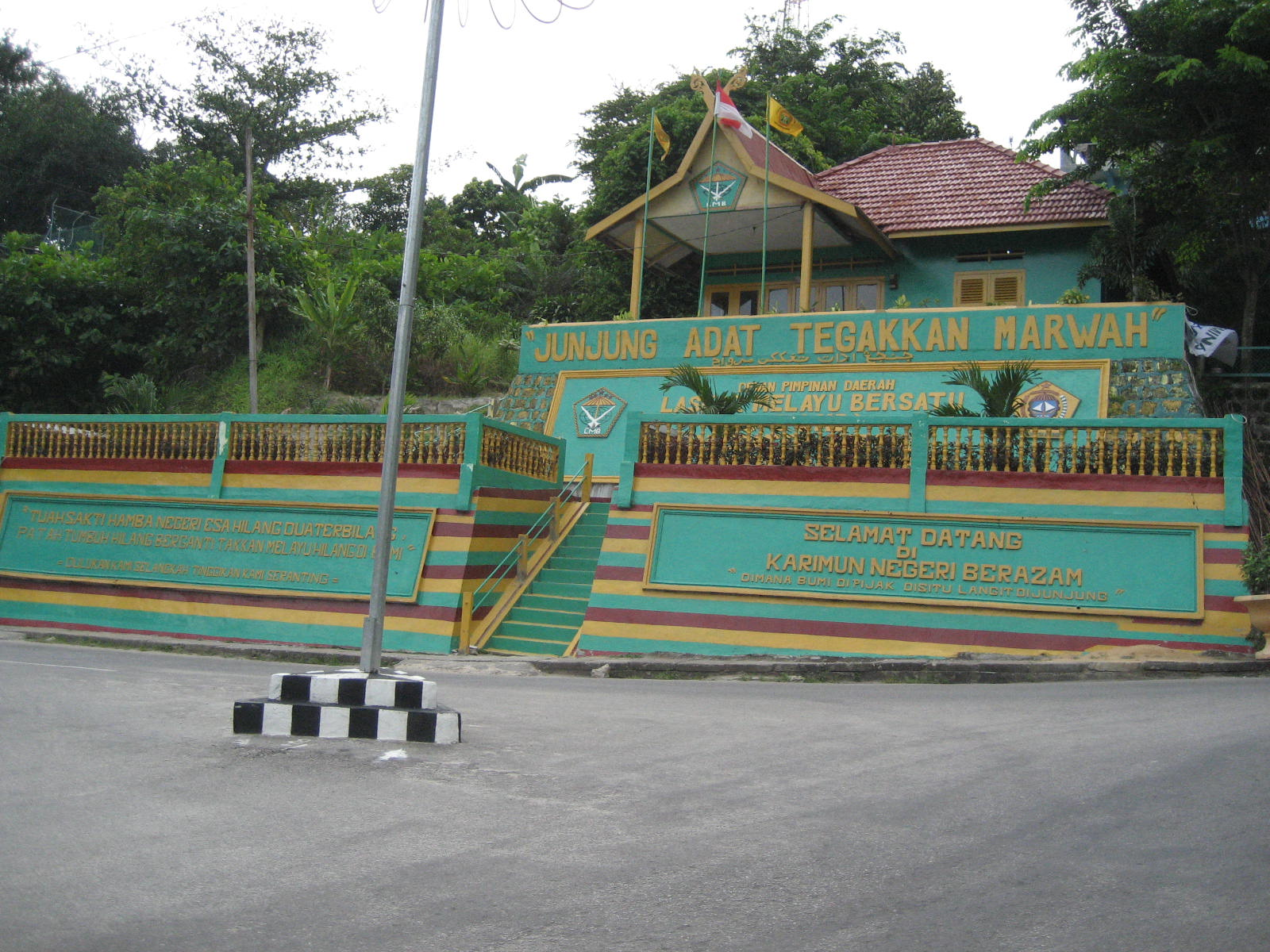
A government building in Tanjung Balai

Due to large scale indiscriminate fishing activity near the island recently, fish stocks have been depleted, and thus the fishing businesses have declined considerably.

The main export of the island is its granite which is one of the best quality in the world.

Sand has also been constantly exported, mainly to Singapore for land reclamation. Indonesian has however limited sand exports over concerns with Singapore's reclamation projects, and banned them outright in the beginning of 2007.

== Transportation ==
The island has many type of public transportation such as oplet (share taxi) which is a van to carry people from one place to another. There are flights from Sei Bati Airport, which has regular flights to and from Pekanbaru, the capital of Riau Province on Sumatra, and also a weekly flight to Dabo (in the Lingga Islands). The port of Tanjung Balai has regular ferries to and from overseas such as Singapore, Malaysia etc, and Rakyat Sri Tanjung Gelam Karimun harbour, which serve domestic route.

The peoples in the island also used their own motorcycle and cars for transport from one place to another.

== See also ==
- Little Karimun, a smaller island just northeast of Great Karimun
- Karimun Jawa, an unrelated archipelago off the north coast of Java
