= Karimun Regency =

Regency in Riau Islands, Indonesia

Karimun Regency Kabupaten Karimun
- Regency
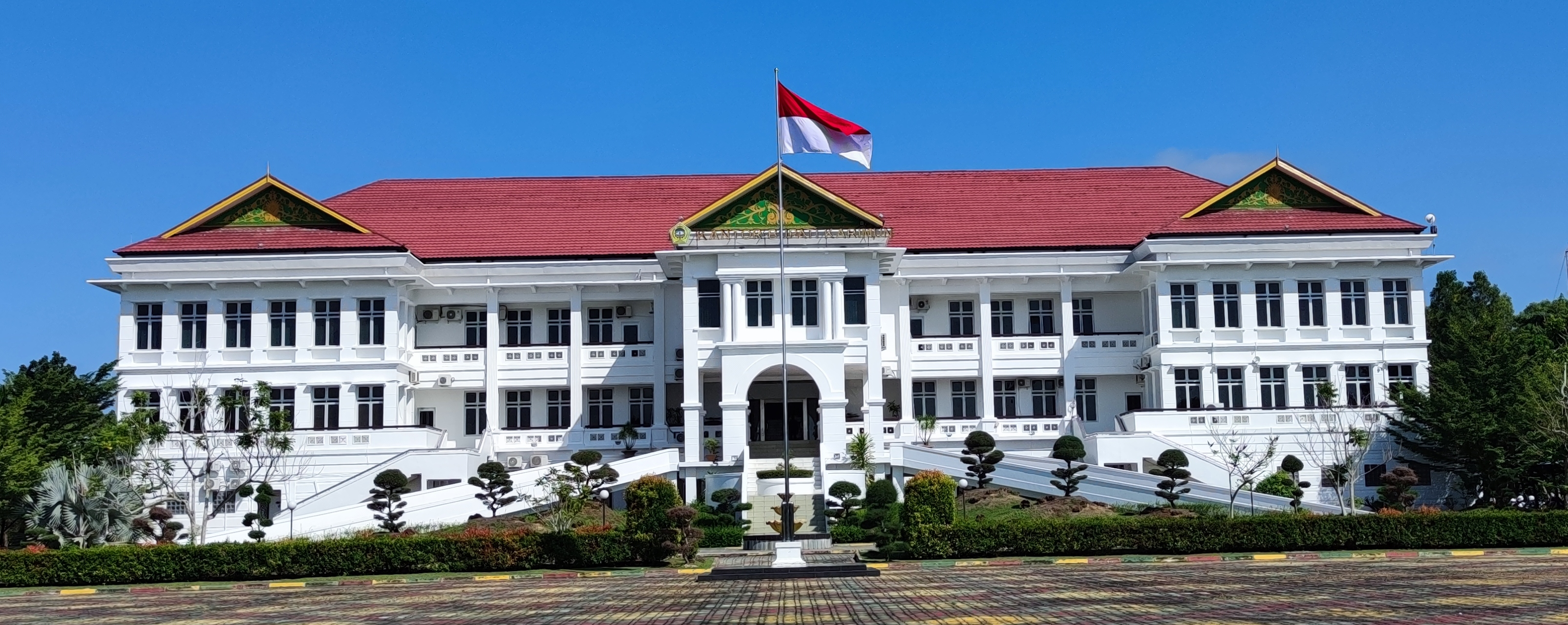
- Karimun Regent Office

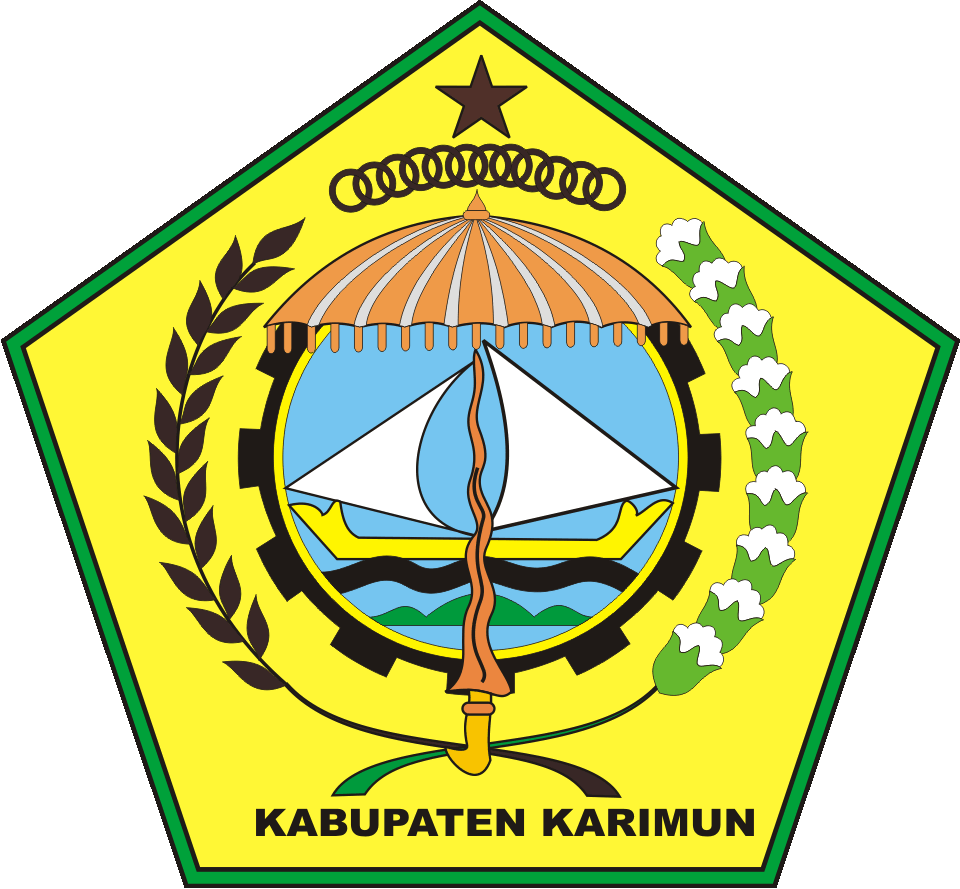
- Seal

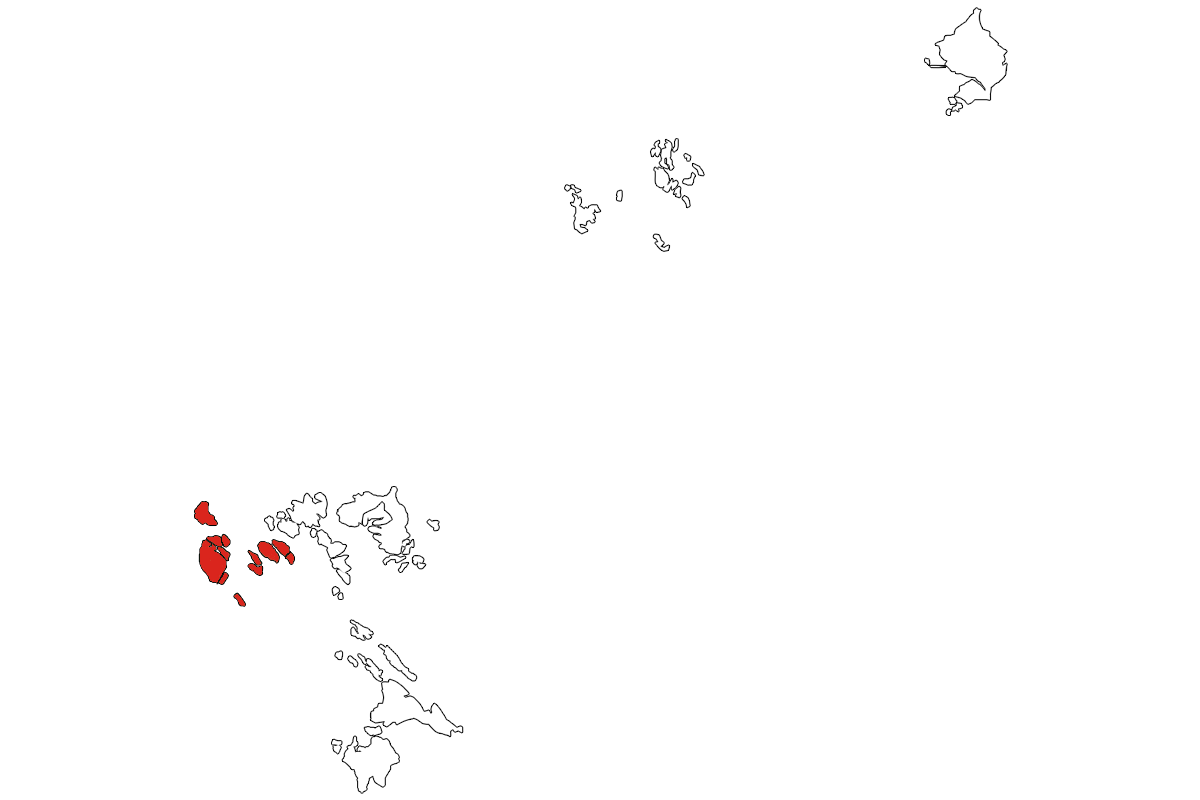
- Location within Riau Islands

- Location in Sumatra and Indonesia Karimun Regency (Indonesia)
- Coordinates: 1°3′0″N 103°22′0″E
- Country: Indonesia
- Province: Riau Islands
- Regency seat: Tanjung Balai Karimun

Government
  - Regent: Iskandarsyah
  - Vice Regant: Rocky Marciano Bawole

Area
  - Total: 1,524.00 km^{2} (588.42 sq mi)

Population (2025 estimate)
  - Total: 276,650
  - Density: 181.53/km^{2} (470.16/sq mi)
- Time zone: UTC+7 (Indonesia Western Time)
- Area code: (+62) 777
- Website: karimunkab.go.id

The Karimun Regency is located in the Riau Islands Province, Indonesia. Besides the island of Great Karimun in the northwest of the regency, the regency also includes the larger island of Kundur to the south of Great Karimun and over 240 lesser islands. The district covers a land area of 1,524 km^{2} and a sea area of 6,460 km^{2}, and its population was 212,561 at the 2010 census and 253,457 at the 2020 census; the official estimate as at mid 2025 was 276,650 (comprising 141,304 males and 135,346 females).

== Administrative districts ==
The regency was originally divided into three districts (kecamatan) — Moro, Kundur and Karimun. In accordance with Law (Undang-Undang) Nomor 53 of 1999, enacted in Jakarta on 4 October 1999, these three were expanded to nine districts, with the creation of the new districts of Meral, Tebing, Buru, Kundur Utara, Kundur Barat and Durai. On 11 June 2012 a further three districts were added, based on Regional Regulation No. 02 of 2012, effective in July 2012 – Ungar (from part of Kundur District), Belat (from part of Kundur Utara District), and Meral Barat (out of the western part of Meral District). Then in 2022 two additional districts were created, based on Regional Regulation No. 2 of 2022, effective in February 2022 – Sugie Besar (from part of Moro District) and Selat Gelam (from part of Karimun District).

The fourteen districts are tabulated below with their areas and populations at the 2010 and 2020 censuses, together with the official estimates as at mid 2025. The table also includes the locations of the district administrative centres, the number of administrative villages (rural desa and urban kelurahan) and the number of islands within each district, and their postal codes.

Great Karimun Island (Pulau Karimunbesar) comprises the districts of Karimun (which forms Tanjung Balai town), Meral, Tebing and Meral Barat. Kundur Island is a group of islands comprising the districts of Kundur, Kundur Utara, Kundur Barat, Ungar, Belat, Buru and Selat Mendaun (or Selat Gelam).

Kode Wilayah	Name of District (kecamatan)	Area in km^{2}	Pop'n Census 2010	Pop'n Census 2020	Pop'n Estimate mid 2025	Admin centre	No. of kelu- rahan	No. of desa	No. of islands	Post Code
21.02.01	Moro ^{(a)}	146.63	17,512	18,640	11,431	Moro	2 ^{(b)}	3	86	29663
21.02.09	Durai ^{(c)}	62.98	5,821	6,026	6,360	Telaga Tujuh	-	4	47	29665
21.02.14	Sugie Besar ^{(a)}	517.50	^{(d)}	^{(d)}	8,191	Rawajaya	-	7		29663
21.02.02	Kundur	83.74	33,878	30,490	31,405	Tanjung Batu Kota	3 ^{(e)}	3	24	29662
21.02.07	Kundur Utara (North Kundur)	245.65	17,066	12,653	13,073	Tanjung Berlian Kota	1	4	23	29662
21.02.08	Kundur Barat (West Kundur)	189.92	16,146	18,854	19,417	Sawang	1	4	12	29662
21.02.11	Ungar	55.53	^{(f)}	5,660	5,977	Sungai Buluh	1	3	26	29669
21.02.12	Belat	109.34	^{(g)}	6,346	6,756	Sebele	-	6	22	29660
21.02.03	Karimun	11.23	42,601	51,353	47,932	Tanjung Balai Kota	6 ^{(h)}	-	24	29661
21.02.06	Buru ^{(i)}	73.40	8,967	9,770	10,512	Buru	2 ^{(j)}	2	7	29664
21.02.04	Meral	57.85	44,627	48,964	55,495	Meral Kota	6 ^{(k)}	-	4	29666
21.02.05	Tebing	76.35	25,943	29,721	37,863	Tebing	5 ^{(l)}	1	2	29668
21.02.10	Meral Barat (West Meral)	61.55	^{(m)}	14,980	18,083	Darussalam	2 ^{(n)}	2	22	29667
21.02.13	Selat Gelam ^{(i)}	40.02	^{(q)}	^{(q)}	4,155	Parit	-	3		29661
21.02	Totals	1,524.00	212,561	253,457	276,650		29	42	256	

Note: (a) a group of islands east of Kundur, situated to the southwest of Batam Island; the largest islands are Sugie, Citlim and Moro Tengah (others are Sugibawah, Moro Laut, Moro Darat and Durian); however in February 2022 an extra district was cut out of the eastern part of Moro District; this new Sugie Besar District includes Sugi Basar and Citlim Islands, and incorporates 7 of the 10 desa formerly in Moro District.
(b) the two kelurahan are Moro (with 3,981 inhabitants as at mid 2023) and Moro Timur (with 3,233 inhabitants as at mid 2023).
(c) a group of islands situated to the southeast of Kundur Island.
(d) the 2010 and 2020 Census figures for the new Sugie Basar District are included in that for Moro District, from which the new district was cut out. (e) the 3 kelurahan are Gading Sari, Tanjung Batu Barat and Tanjung Batu Kota.
(f) the 2010 Census figure for the new Ungar District is included with that for Kundur District, from which the new district was cut out on 11 June 2012.
(g) the 2010 Census figure for the new Belat District is included with that for Kundur Utara District, from which the new district was cut out on 11 June 2012.
(h) the 6 kelurahan (with populations as at mid 2023) are Lubuk Semut (6,147), Sungai Lakam Barat (11,500), Sungai Lakam Timur (9,905), Tanjung Balai (7,453), Tanjung Balai Kota (6,192) and Teluk Air (6,568).
(i) In 2022 an extra district was formed out of what had formerly been the southern part of Karimun District; this Selat Gelam District (alternatively called Selat Mendaun District) incorporates 3 of the 5 desa formerly in Karimun District, i.e. Parit, Selat Mendaun and Tulung desa (covering the small islands of Pulau Parit, Pulau Tulang and Pulau Lumut).
(j) the two kelurahan are Buru and Lubuk Puding.
(k) the 6 kelurahan (with populations as at mid 2023) are Baran Barat (9,983), Baran Timur (9,492), Meral Kota (7,569), Parit Benut (6,548), Sungai Raya (7,587) and Sungai Pasir (12,076).
(l) the 5 kelurahan are Harjosari, Kapling, Pamak, Tebing and Teluk Uma.
(m) the 2010 Census figure for the new Meral Barat District is included with that for Meral District, from which the new district was cut out on 11 June 2012. (n) the two kelurahan are Darussalam and Pasir Panjang.
(q) the 2010 and 2020 Census figures for the new Selat Gelam District are included in that for Karimun District, from which the new district was cut out.

== Demographics ==
=== Religion ===
Religion in Karimun Regency (2023)
religion	percent
Islam	85.90%
Buddhism	9.02%
Protestantism	3.71%
Roman Catholicism	1.03%
Confucianism	0.33%
Hinduism	0.01%

Islam is the dominant religion in the regency, with 84.09% of the total population identifying as Muslim. Other religions are Buddhism, which forms 10.68% of the total population, Christianity, which forms 4.85% of the total population, Hinduism, which forms 0.01% of the total population, and Confucianism, which forms 0.37% of the total population.

== See also ==
- Great Karimun, the main island in the regency
- Little Karimun
- Kundur Island
