= Samanco District =

Samanco
- District
- Location of Samanco in the Santa Province
- Coordinates: 9°17′S 78°27′W
- Country: Peru
- Region: Ancash
- Province: Santa
- Founded: April 15, 1955
- Capital: Samanco

Government
  - Mayor: Carlos Enrique Melendez Bismarck

Area
  - Total: 154.14 km^{2} (59.51 sq mi)
- Elevation: 21 m (69 ft)

Population (2005 census)
  - Total: 4,083
  - Density: 26.49/km^{2} (68.61/sq mi)
- Time zone: UTC-5 (PET)
- UBIGEO: 021807

Samanco District is one of nine districts of the Santa Province in Peru.
