= Little Karimun =

Island in Indonesia

Little Karimun (Karimun Kecil or Karimun Anak in Indonesian) is an unhabited island in the Strait of Malacca, about 58 kilometres (36 mi) west of Batam and 35 km south-west of Singapore. It belongs to the Karimun Regency of the Riau Islands Province of Indonesia. It is located just off the east coast of Sumatra.

== Geography ==
Little Karimun lies just to the north-east of Great Karimun, from which it is separated by a deep channel about 800 metres (2,600 ft) wide. Its highest point is 377 m above sea level. It is hilly with fertile soil.

The northern tip of Little Karimun is one of the baseline points that define the legal boundaries of Indonesia.(1°09′59″N 103°23′20″E).

Little Karimun is part of the Tebing District (also known as Kecamatan Tebing in Indonesian) which also include part of the great karimun island.

== History ==
In the 18th and 19th centuries, Little Karimun was part of the Johor Sultanate then the Riau-Lingga Sultanate.

== See also ==
- Karimun Jawa, an unrelated archipelago off the north coast of Java
- Great Karimun, the bigger island just southwest of Little Karimun
