= Chimbote District =

Coordinates: 9°04′59″S 78°36′00″W

Chimbote
- District
- Location of Chimbote in the Santa province
- Country: Peru
- Region: Ancash
- Province: Santa
- Founded: December 6, 1906
- Capital: Chimbote

Government
  - Mayor: Roberto Briceño Franco (2019–2022)

Area
  - Total: 1,467 km^{2} (566 sq mi)
- Elevation: 4 m (13 ft)

Population (2017)
  - Total: 206,213
  - Density: 140.6/km^{2} (364.1/sq mi)
- Time zone: UTC-5 (PET)
- UBIGEO: 021801

Chimbote District is one of nine districts of the Santa Province in Peru.
