= Foca Island (Peru) =

Island in Peru

Isla Foca (Spanish)
- Location within Peru

Geography
- Location: Pacific Ocean
- Coordinates: 5°12′34″S 81°12′23″W

Administration
- Peru
- Region: Piura

Additional information
- Time zone: PET (UTC-5)

Foca Island (Spanish: Isla Foca) is an island in the Pacific Ocean located in the northern Peruvian region of Piura. The island is within the area of convergence of the Humboldt Current and the Equatorial Current, with the presence of marine species of both temperate and cold waters due to that phenomenon.
