= Nepeña District =

Coordinates: 9°10′01″S 78°22′59″W

Nepeña
- District
- Location of Nepeña in the Santa province
- Country: Peru
- Region: Ancash
- Province: Santa
- Capital: Nepeña

Area
  - Total: 458.24 km^{2} (176.93 sq mi)
- Elevation: 144 m (472 ft)

Population (2005 census)
  - Total: 12,059
  - Density: 26.316/km^{2} (68.158/sq mi)
- Time zone: UTC-5 (PET)
- UBIGEO: 021806
- Website: http://www.muninepena.gob.pe

Nepeña District is one of nine districts of the Santa Province in Peru.

== History ==
On April 12, 1873 was enacted Supreme Resolution which raises the Nepeña Municipal Agency to the category of Nepeña District. On November 22, 1874 the first municipal council is installed, investing as Mayor to Mr. Juan Rodríguez; as Deputy Mayor, Mr. Esteban Naveda; as councilor, Mr. Manuel Márquez Paredes; as auditors, Messrs Teodorico Terry and José María Cabrera. However, it is known that in the political system of the Geographical Society of Lima, Nepeña appears as district, founded by the Protector of Peru José de San Martín, on February 12, 1821. It has been established as a commemorative date of political creation of Nepeña district on April 12 of each year, carrying out a ceremony at the District Municipality.

== Geography ==
Nepeña has an area of 458.24 km^{2}.

== Locations ==
Formed by the towns of Huacatambo, Capellanía (In en. Chaplaincy), Nepeña, La Grama (In en. The Grama), Cerro Blanco (In en. White Hill), San José, San Jacinto, Motocachy, San Juan and Máquina Vieja (In en. Old Machine).

The Punkurí museum is located on the Nepeña territory.

== Authorities ==
=== Municipal ===
- 2007 - 2010
  - Mayor: Luis Falconeri Montalvo Rodríguez from Movement "Nepeña Querido" ("Dear Nepeña") - (NQ)
  - Councilors: Juan Gregorio Longobardi Bedón (NQ), Eva Janet Ponce Melo (NQ), Oswaldo Martín Leiva Fajardo (NQ), Santos Alfonso Cáceres Flores (NQ), Primitivo Fortunato Ramírez Moreno.
- 2011–2014
  - Mayor: Luis Alberto Collazos Matheus, from Movement “Áncash Dignidad” (MAD).
  - Councilors: Antonio Félix Moreno Villanueva (MAD), Carlos Antonio Moreno Blanquillo (MAD), Demóstenes Orlando Benites Cortez (MAD), Ana Cecilia Moreno López de Ambrocio (MAD), Zenón Luis Guevara Ramírez (Fonavistas del Perú).
- 2015–2018
  - Mayor: Manuel Enrique Figueroa Laos, from political party “Democracia Directa” (DD)
  - Councilors: Elmer Pierre Gálvez Caruajulca (DD), Carlos Anselmo Castillejo Diestra (DD), Lidia Martha Hinostroza Calixto (DD), Albertini Rodríguez Romero (DD), Abraham Alexi Meregildo Vidal (Perú Posible / Possible Peru).
