= Santa province =

Coordinates: 9°04′59″S 78°36′00″W

Santa
- Province
- Flag Coat of arms

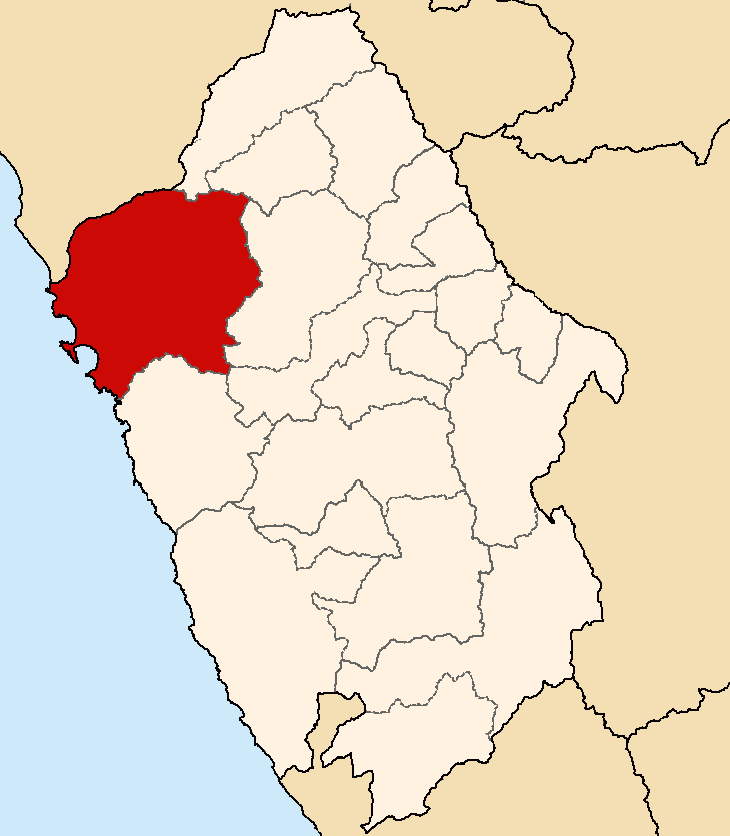
- Location of Santa in the Ancash Region
- Country: Peru
- Region: Ancash
- Founded: February 12, 1821
- Capital: Chimbote

Government
  - Mayor: Roberto Briceño Franco (2019-2022)

Area
  - Total: 4,004.99 km^{2} (1,546.34 sq mi)

Population
  - Total: 435,807
  - Density: 108.816/km^{2} (281.832/sq mi)
- Website: www.munisanta.gob.pe

Santa is one of twenty provinces of the Ancash Region in Peru.

The province of Santa was created on February 12, 1821. Its capital, Chimbote, that long time ago became the first fishing port of the world, is the most important city of the coastal zone of Ancash.

In 1992 it was the site of a famous massacre of campesinos.

== Geography ==
The city and port of Santa are located in the large, fertile valleys of the Santa and Lacramarca rivers. These valleys have extensive sown plains with cotton, rice, sugar and nutritional products. The city of Santa is the first colonial city of the Ancash coast.

This rich valley is formed by the outlet of the Santa River. The Santa River is born in the lake Quñuqqucha in the Cordillera Blanca (White mountain range). It crosses the Callejón de Huaylas ("Alley of Huaylas") in all its extension. It also cut the Cordillera Negra (Black mountain range) in the imposing Cañón del Pato (Mountain trail of the Duck) and it ends at the plains of Santa, after a distance traveled of 336 kilometers (209 mi).

One of the highest peaks of the province is Quñuq Ranra at 5,822 m (19,101 ft). Other mountains are listed below:

- Hatun Hirka
- Ichik Punta
- Ichik Wiri
- Kukuli
- Kushuru
- Mata Mata
- Palta Hirka
- Puka Punta
- Qarwaqucha
- Quñuq Warmi
- Silla Qhata
- Tinya
- Wiru Qataq
- Yana Yaku
- Yuraq Waqta

== Political division ==
Santa is divided into nine districts, which are:

1. Coishco
2. Santa
3. Chimbote
4. Macate
5. Cáceres del Perú
6. Nuevo Chimbote
7. Nepeña
8. Moro
9. Samanco
