= Fountain of Campo das Hortas =

Fountain in Sé, Braga, Portugal

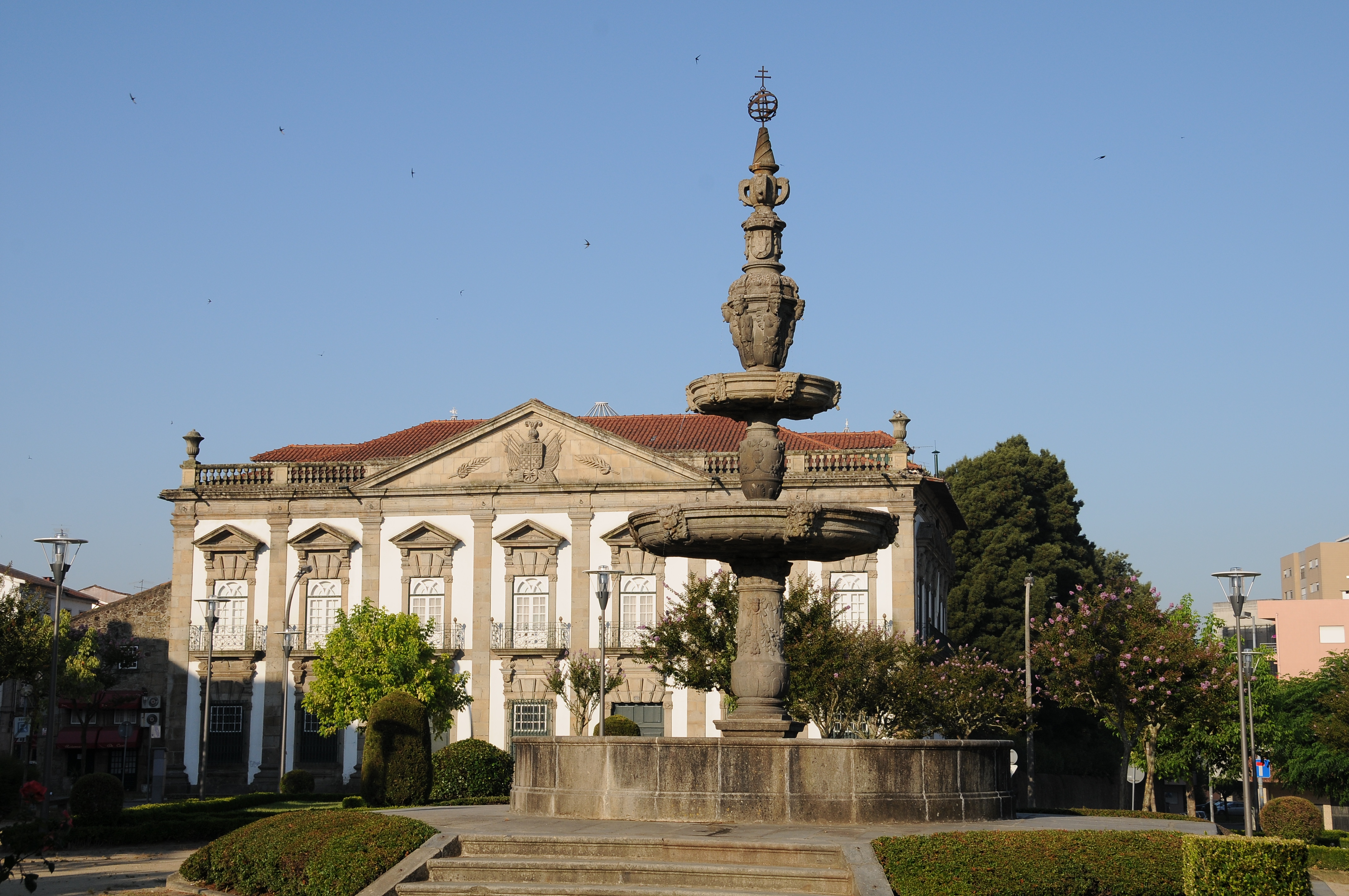
- The ornate fountain of Campo das Hortas in front of the Residence Cunhas Reis
- Artist: Manuel Luis
- Medium: Granite Fountain
- Subject: Campo das Hortas
- Location: Sé, Braga, Portugal
- 41°32′59.77″N 8°25′48.73″W
- Owner: Portuguese Republic

The Fountain of Campo das Hortas (Portuguese: Chafariz do Campo das Hortas) is a fountain located in civil parish of Sé, municipality of Braga in northern Portugal.

== History ==
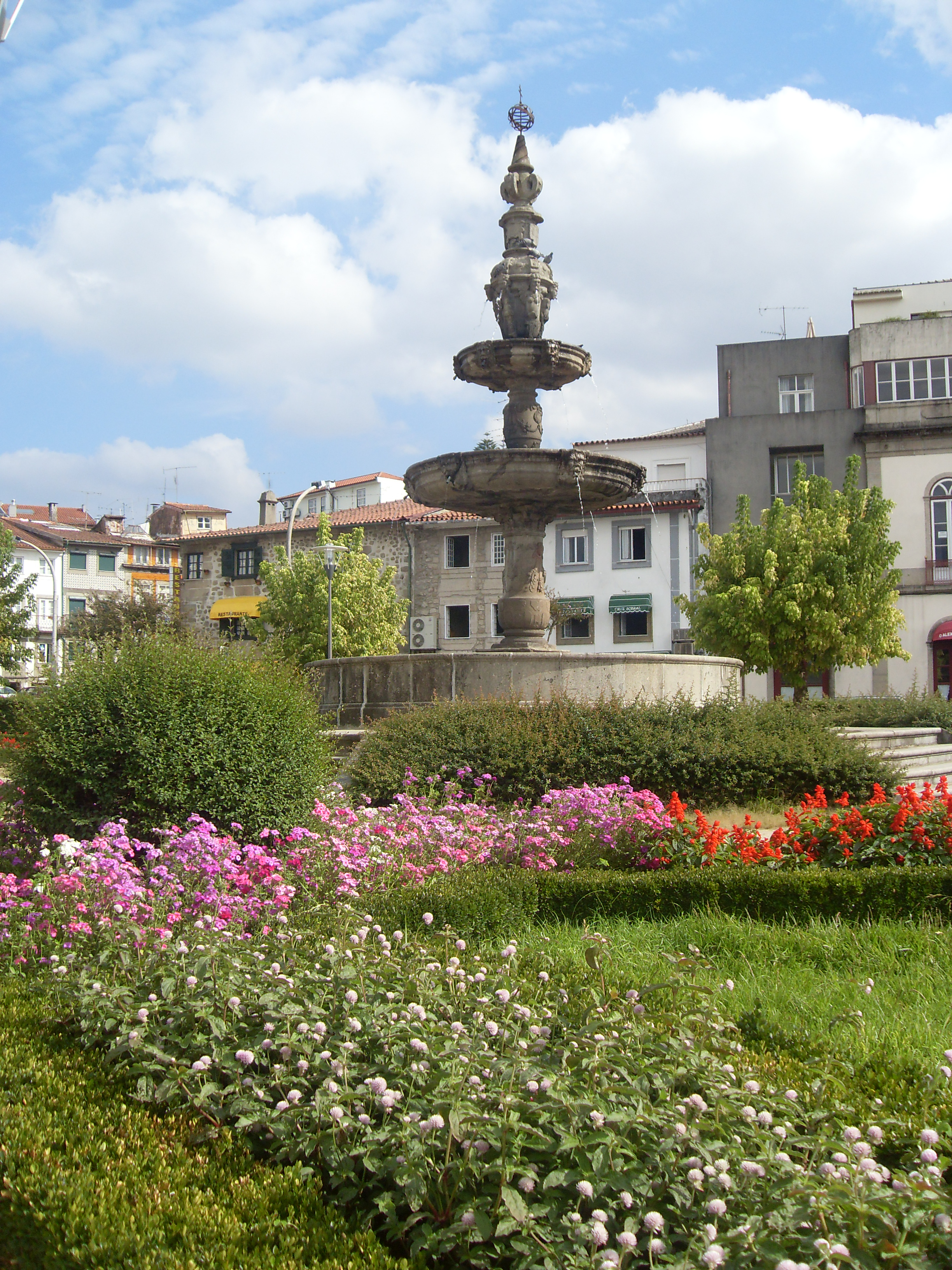
The fountain is located in Campo das Hortas, a greenspace in front of the Arco da Porta Nova

This fountain is an example of the model of fountain seeded throughout the 16th and 17th century Portugal, which was first promoted in 1554 by João Lopes o Velho (the Elder) in Viana do Castelo.

On 8 March 1594, a contract was issued, by Archbishop Agostinho de Jesus for the Archdiocese of Braga, to master-mason Manuel Luis to construct a fountain in the Campo de Santa Ana. There was no indication if the project was completed within the year or pre-defined time.

By the 19th century, the fountain was relocated to the Campo das Hortas.

In 1910, the crosses of Santa Ana and Campo das Hortas were classified as one national monument. Although they were not located together, nor naturally contemporaneous, they were deemed to be constructed identically by Portuguese authorities.

== Characteristics ==
It is implanted in a harmonious location, isolated in the centre of garden space fronting the Arco da Porta Nova.

Built on an octagonal base, it consists of alternating four-steps divided by green-space, with a circular tank at the top of the staircase. The circular tank is marked by a column with bowl, decorated in grotesque animals ordered by six spouts, which is repeated in the smaller bowl. From the second segment the column is decorated by three sections: the first with six figures at the spouts, the second with the coat-of-arms of Archbishop D. Baltasar Limpo, and the third a cylindrical body decorated with four rounded spirals. The top of the spire is decorated with an armillary sphere and cross in metal.

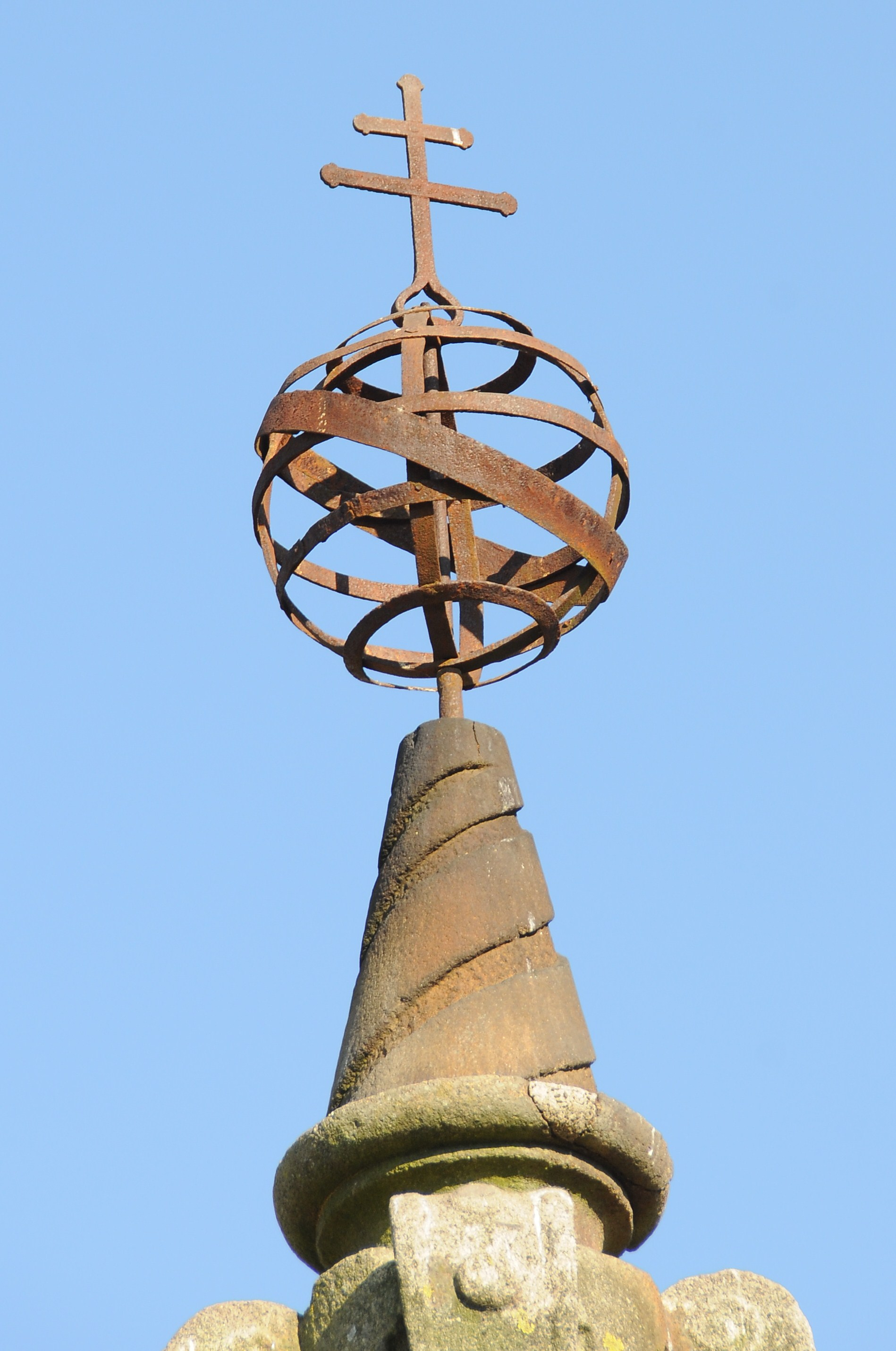
Detail of armillary sphere and cardinal's cross

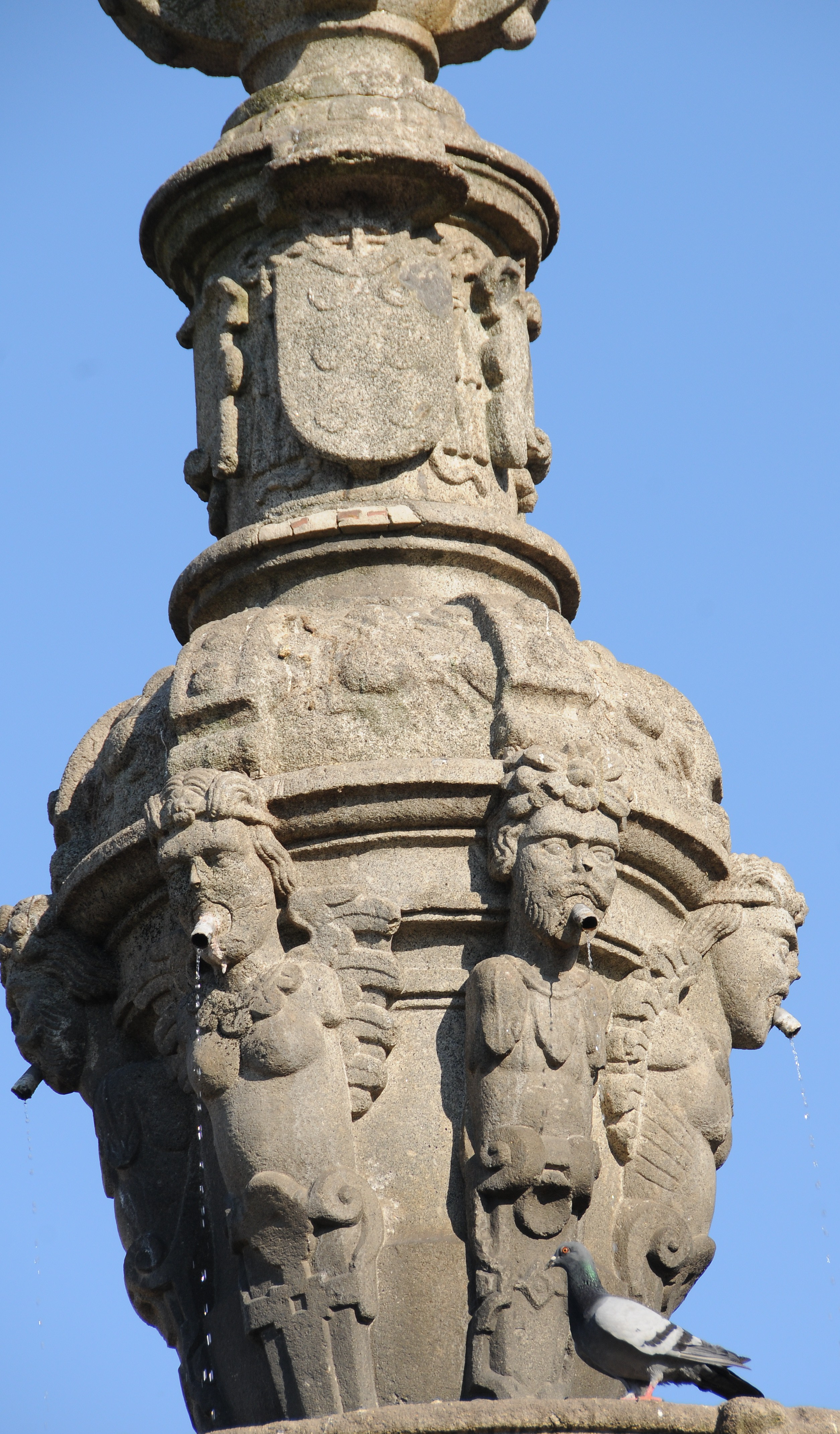
Detail of spouts, showing figures and coat-of-arms

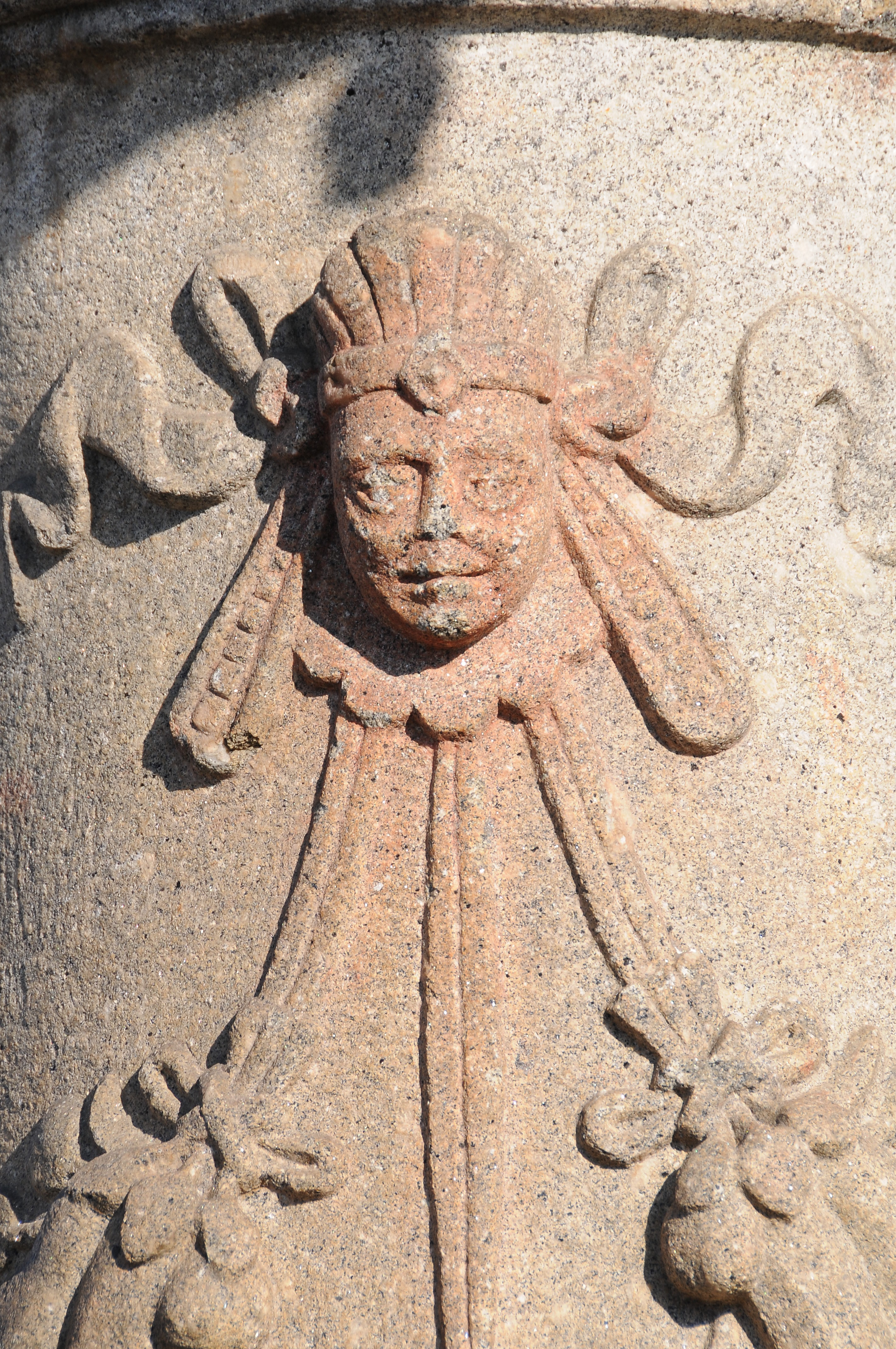
Figure of a bishop, although unclear which

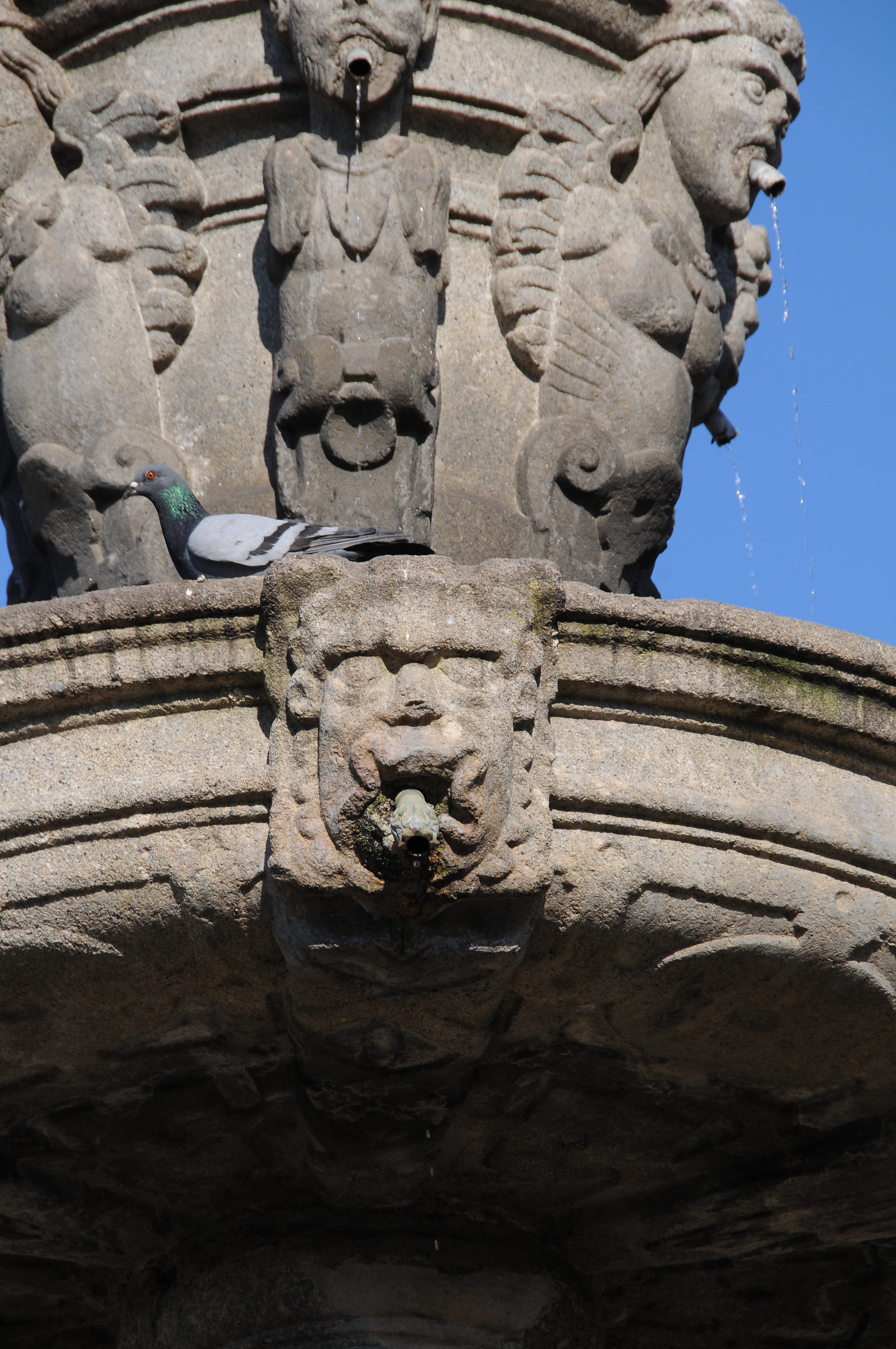
The secondary bowl with figures
