= Image Museum =

Image Museum may refer to:

- Image Museum (Portugal) in Braga, Portugal
- Image Museum of Hsinchu City in Hsinchu City, Taiwan
