= Biscainhos Museum =

Residence of the Biscainhos
- Casa dos Biscainhos
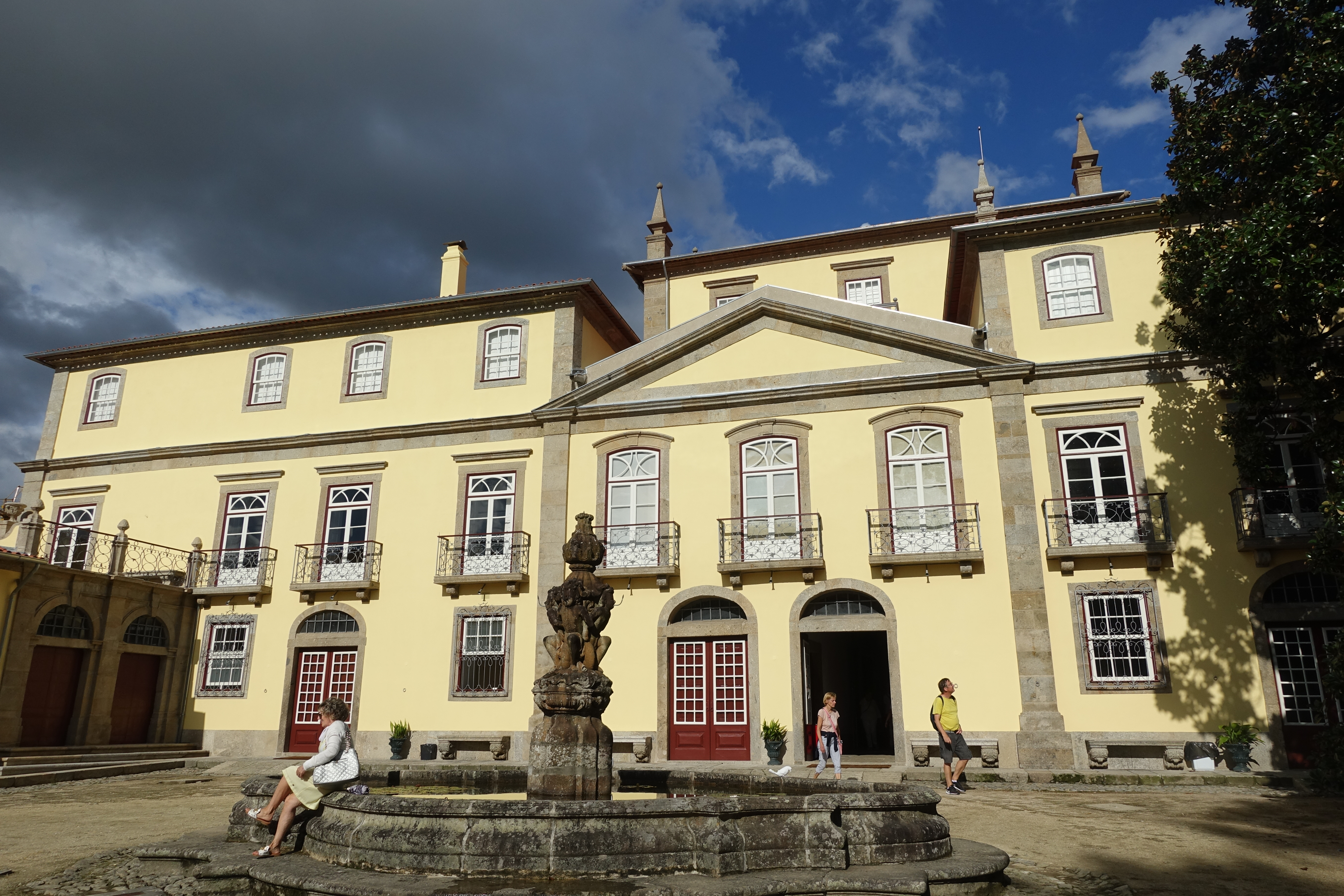
- The main entrance to the former-residence of the Biscainhos, later transformed into regional museum
- Interactive map of the Residence of the Biscainhos area

General information
- Type: Residence
- Architectural style: Baroque
- Location: Braga (Maximinos, Sé e Cividade), Braga, Portugal
- Coordinates: 41°33′4.4″N 8°25′46.4″W
- Opened: 18th century
- Owner: Portugal

Technical details
- Material: Braga Granite

Design and construction
- Architect: Alberto da Silva Bessa

Website
- museus.bragadigital.pt/Biscainhos

The Residence of Biscainhos (Portuguese: Casa dos Biscainhos/Museu dos Biscainhos), is a palace and museum located in civil parish of Braga (Maximinos, Sé e Cividade), in the municipality of Braga, in northern Portuguese district of Braga.

== History ==
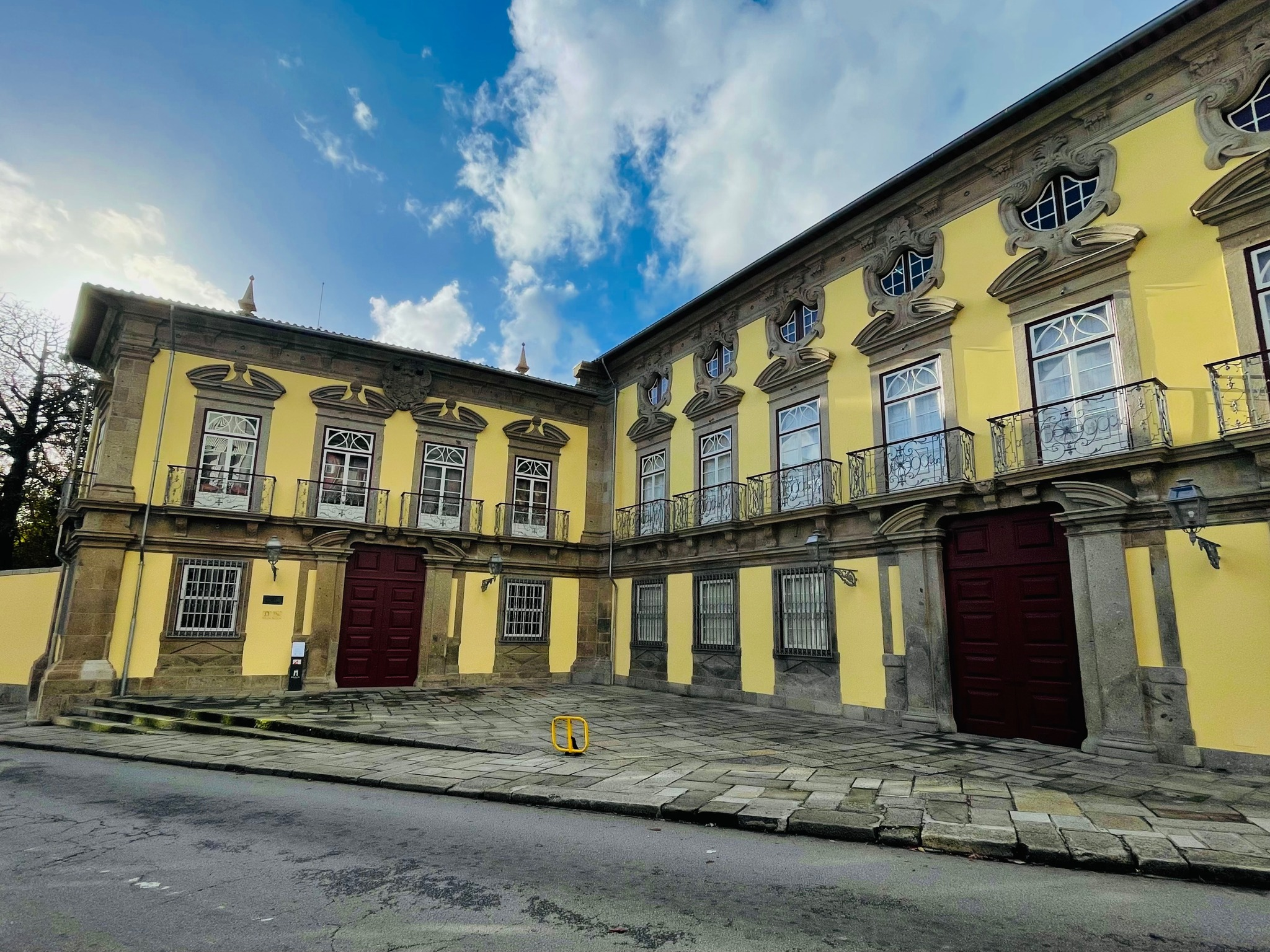
One of the facades of Biscainhos

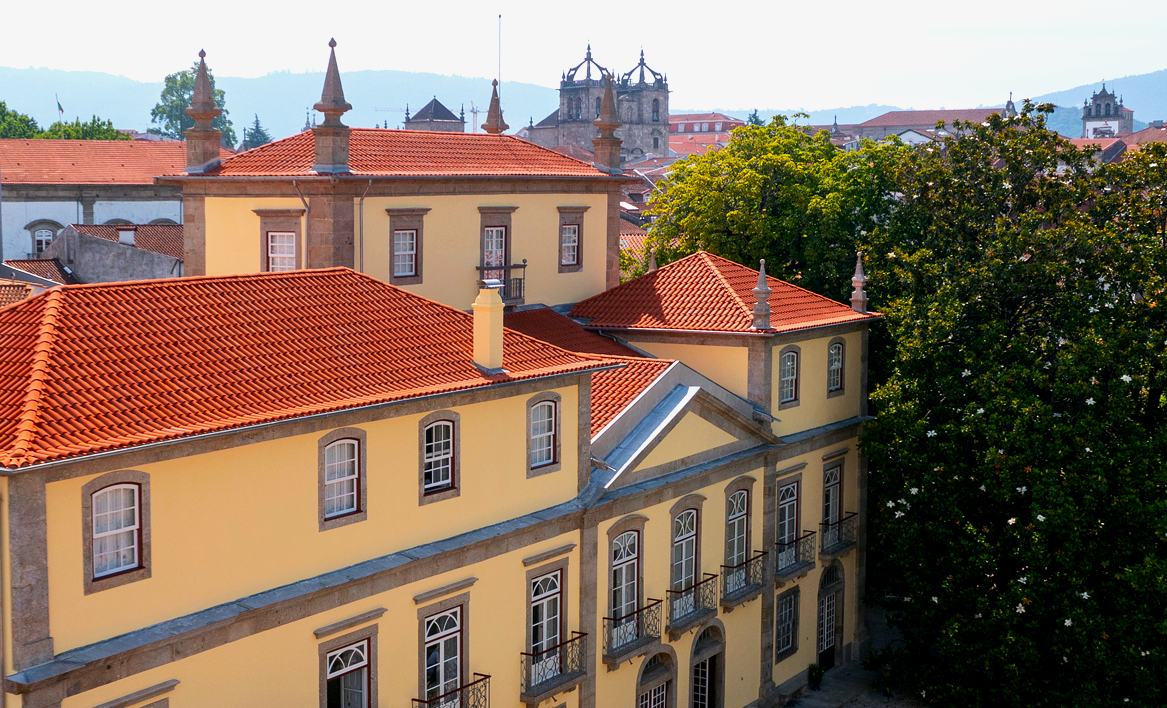
View of the Biscainhos residence

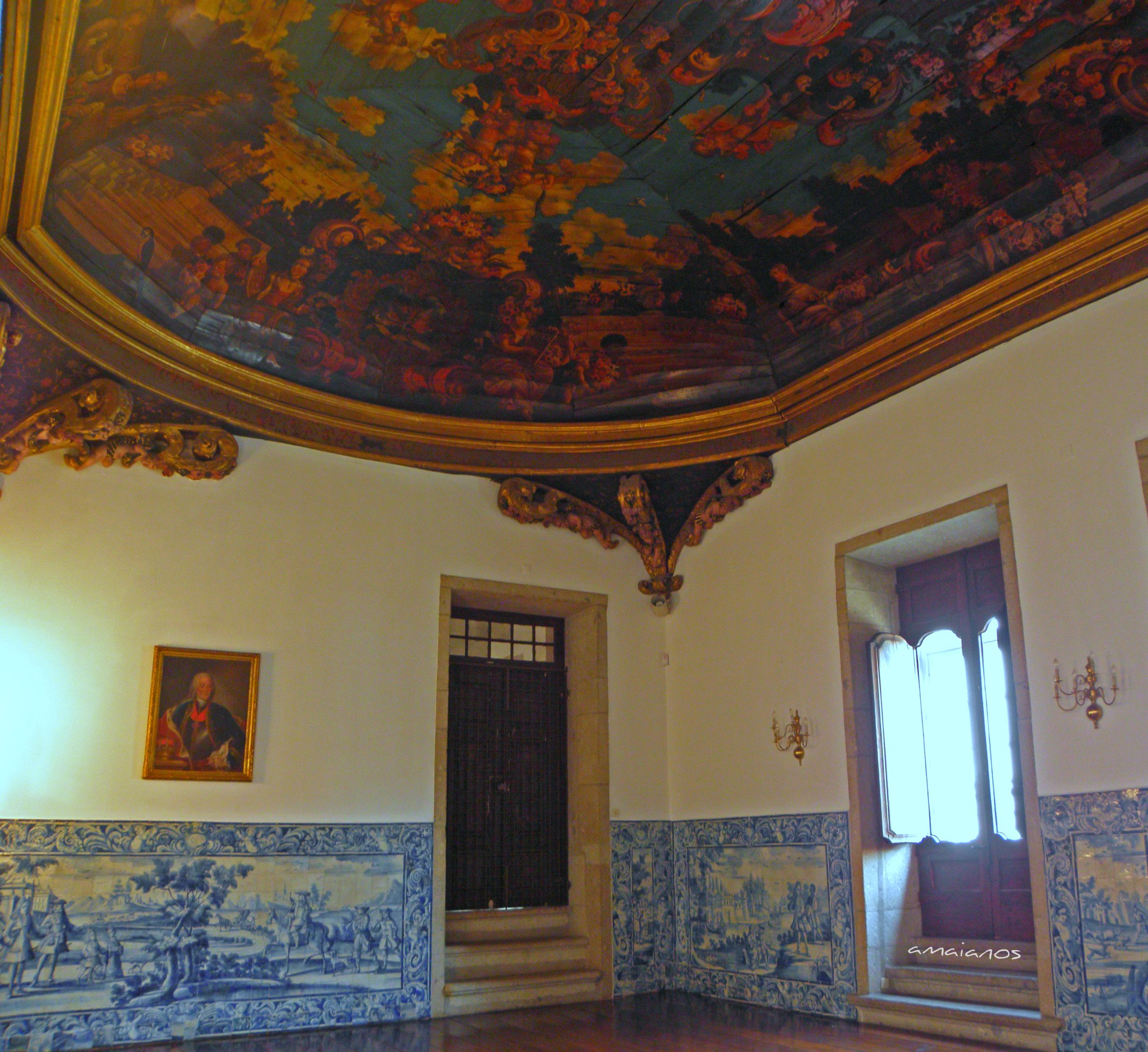
Interior of the palace

In 1665, Maria da Silva e Sousa married Dr. Constantino Ribeiro do Lago (1619-1686), who was one of the most important civil personalities in Braga. He was a Knight in the Order of Christ, alcalde of Ervededo, Overseer and Judge of Braga, Chancellor of Relação, attorney-general of Mitra, represented the city in the 1667 Cortes in Lisbon. Lago ordered the construction of a residence, that was likely constructed by Basque artisans from the province of Biscay, then working in the cathedral of Braga, resulting in its name, Biscainhos. The work was concluded in 1699 by his son, Diogo de Sousa da Silva, who was also a knight in the Order of Christ.

In the 18th century, over three generations, the residence was passed-on through the matrilineal descendant of the family.

On 26 November 1712, Francisco Pereira da Silva (who was the Dean of the Cathedral of Braga) signed a contract with mason Manuel Fernandes da Silva, to expand the residence along Rua dos Biscaínhos, the second executed to that effect. In the course of this work, a ceiling painting in the main hall was executed by painter Manuel Furtado de Mendonça (in 1724), and later, azulejo tiles, which came from fabricators in Coimbra.

In the intervening years it passed-into the possession of various illustrious owners. António Pereira Pinto de Eça, was administrator of the second founding of Bertiandos. João Pereira Forjaz Coutinho, was the son of the Secretário dos Negócios Estrangeiros, da Guerra e da Marinha (Secretary for International Affairs, War and the Army). Damião Pereira da Silva de Sousa e Menezes (1764-1835) was administrator of the first founding of Bertiandos. Gonçalo Pereira da Silva de Sousa e Menezes (1797-1856), Count of Bertiandos, member of the council of Queen D. Maria II, Peer of the Kingdom, Civil Governor of Braga and attorney of the 1928 Cortes. His daughter, Joana Maria do Rosário Francisca Sales Pereira da Silva de Sousa e Menezes (1818-1874), second Countess of Bertiandos, lading-in-waiting of Queens D. Estefânia and D. Maria. Her nephew, Gaspar Lobo Machado do Amaral Cardoso de Menezes, 3rd Viscount of Paço de Nespereira was the last member of the family to be owner of the Residence of Biscainhos.

The dominant period of its history occurred in the 18th century, resulting in exquisite Baroque interiors that included azulejos, ceilings with beautiful relief stucco work and paintings of the period. It was also framed by the magnificent gardens.

In 1963, the building was acquired by the District Junta from the Viscount of Paço de Nespereira, in order to install a museum, with work initiated under the responsibility of Alberto da Silva Bessa. On 11 February 1978, the Museum of the Biscaínhos was opened to the public. Due to the financial incapacity of the district junta, by decree 133/87 (18 March) the building was placed into the management of the IPPAR Instituto Português do Património Cultural (Portuguese Institute of Cultural Patrimony). During this time, the exterior facades were repaired and the paintings in the halls were repaired. But, on 9 August 1991, it was succeeded by its transfer into the management of the Instituto Português de Museus (Portuguese Institute of Museums), in decree 278/91 (Diário da República, Série-1A), and later (29 March 2007), to the Instituto dos Museus e Conservação, I.P. (Institute of Museums and Conservation) by decree 97/2007 (Diário da República, Série 1, 63).

== Architecture ==
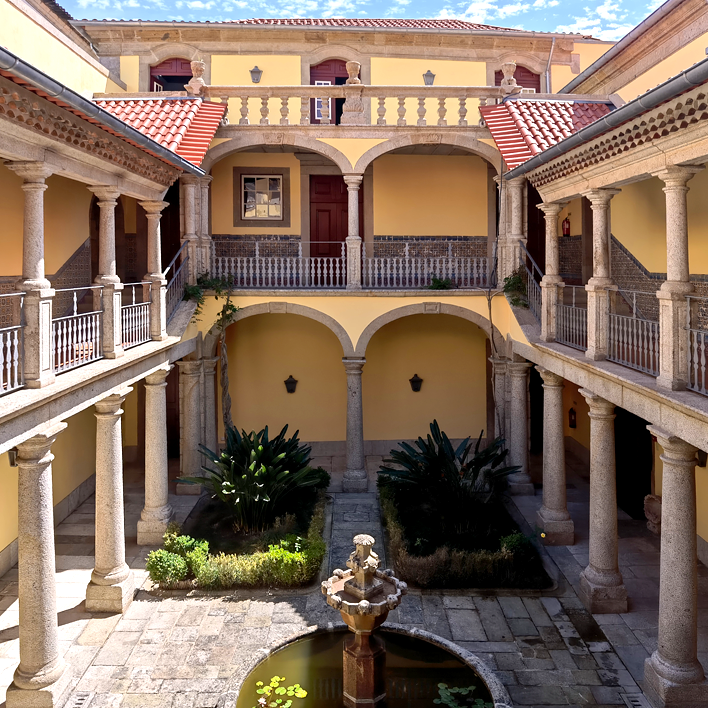
Interior patio

The building is located in an isolated context, situated outside the walls of the ancient city, in an area that was formerly rural, but absorbed into the city of Braga overtime, today inserted in what is considered the historic centre, addorsed to other constructions.

The large entranceway was structured in a way to permit carriages, and other vehicles, to enter by way of a covered patio, that served simultaneously as principal entrance and passage to the stables and gardens. The space is covered in grooved, non-slip, granite slabs and arch-shaped entrances with granite pilasters. In each of these pilasters there are small statues of a page or knight in costume from the 18th century.

The first floor of the main body of the house includes seven rooms. The azulejo hall is of particular interest: it is a large space, about 13 metres (43 ft) long, covered in azulejo tile, with its ceiling covered in painted wood, representing the history of the illustrious, and much venerated, Bracarense Beato Miguel de Carvalho. Next to this a smaller room, painted with mythological motifs, but from a later period. The set of rooms arranged along the garden, especially the dining room, is furnished and decorated with pieces dating from the beginning of the 18th century and the beginning of the 19th. The romanticised scenes, painted on canvas, evoke themes about ruins and fantastical stories.

=== Garden ===
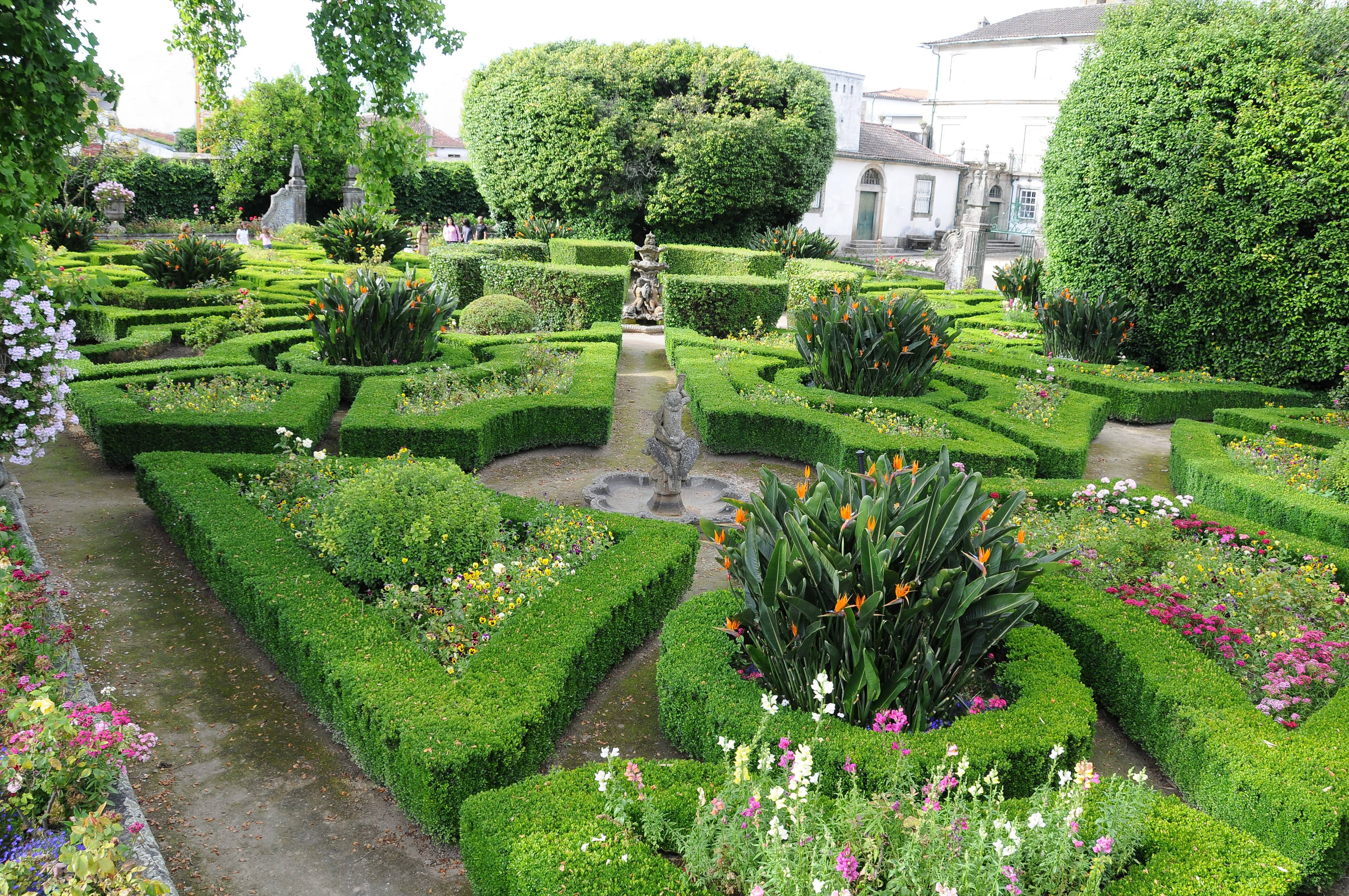
A view of the manicured gardens of the Biscainhos

About a hectare in the rear of the house was surrounded by walls and divided into landscaped terraces. On the opposite wall is a polygonal structure of buttresses which, together with its crowning of battlements and sentries located at the angles, gives it an aspect of a 16th-century fortress. Inside the bulwark's simulacrum is a small temple with dome and lantern, that contains sepulchral slabs dedicated to the former-gentry the masters of the house. The estate is divided into three terraces, rising slightly from the house to the west, separated by walls crowned with tile planting boxes.

The terraces are supported by decorative granite columns that are arranged along the walls and terraces of the estate. Of these terraces, the lower two were cultivated with vegetables and orchard, divided into blocks flanked by boxwood stools. The upper terrace is occupied by the garden itself and by a terrarium that separates it from the house. It occupies a rectangular terrace surrounded by a wall with tiled floor, decorated pyramids, urns and statuary statues, over the access gates, on the side viewpoints and at the angles, together with the raised beds. Inside the flower beds, are five bowls with water springs, similar to those introduced by Muslims during the 8th century, in the Rocaille style. Among the species in the garden are stands of tulip poplar (Liriodendron tulipifera) that were contemporary to the initial plantation.

== The Museum ==
The museum exhibits, on a permanent basis, collections of decorative arts, integrated into the structure of the 18th century northern manorhouse. Its collection includes furniture, ceramics, European and Oriental porcelain, glassware, and examples of European and Portuguese watches and clocks.
