= Image Museum (Portugal) =

Coordinates: 41.55033°N 8.429381°W

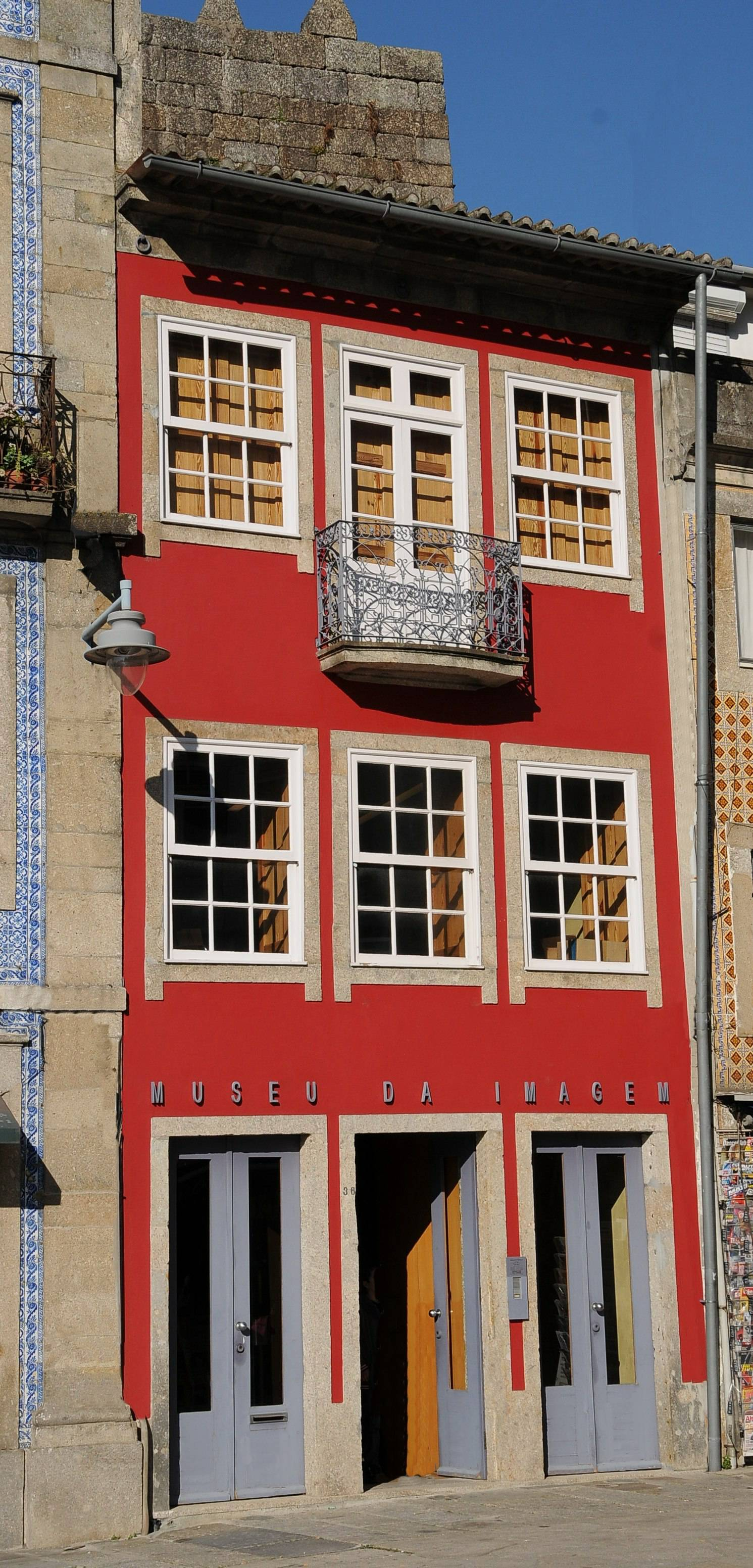

The Image Museum or in Portuguese Museu da Imagem is located in Braga, Portugal and is dedicated to photography.

The collection is one of the largest and most important in Portugal. It holds images, by both classic and contemporary photographers, and illustrates a wide range of subject matter, mainly historic photos from Braga.

The museum opened on April 25, 1999, and is close to Arco da Porta Nova, in a building from the 19th century and a tower, from the Braga Castle.
