= Roman Milestones of Braga =

Ancient Road Marker in Portugal

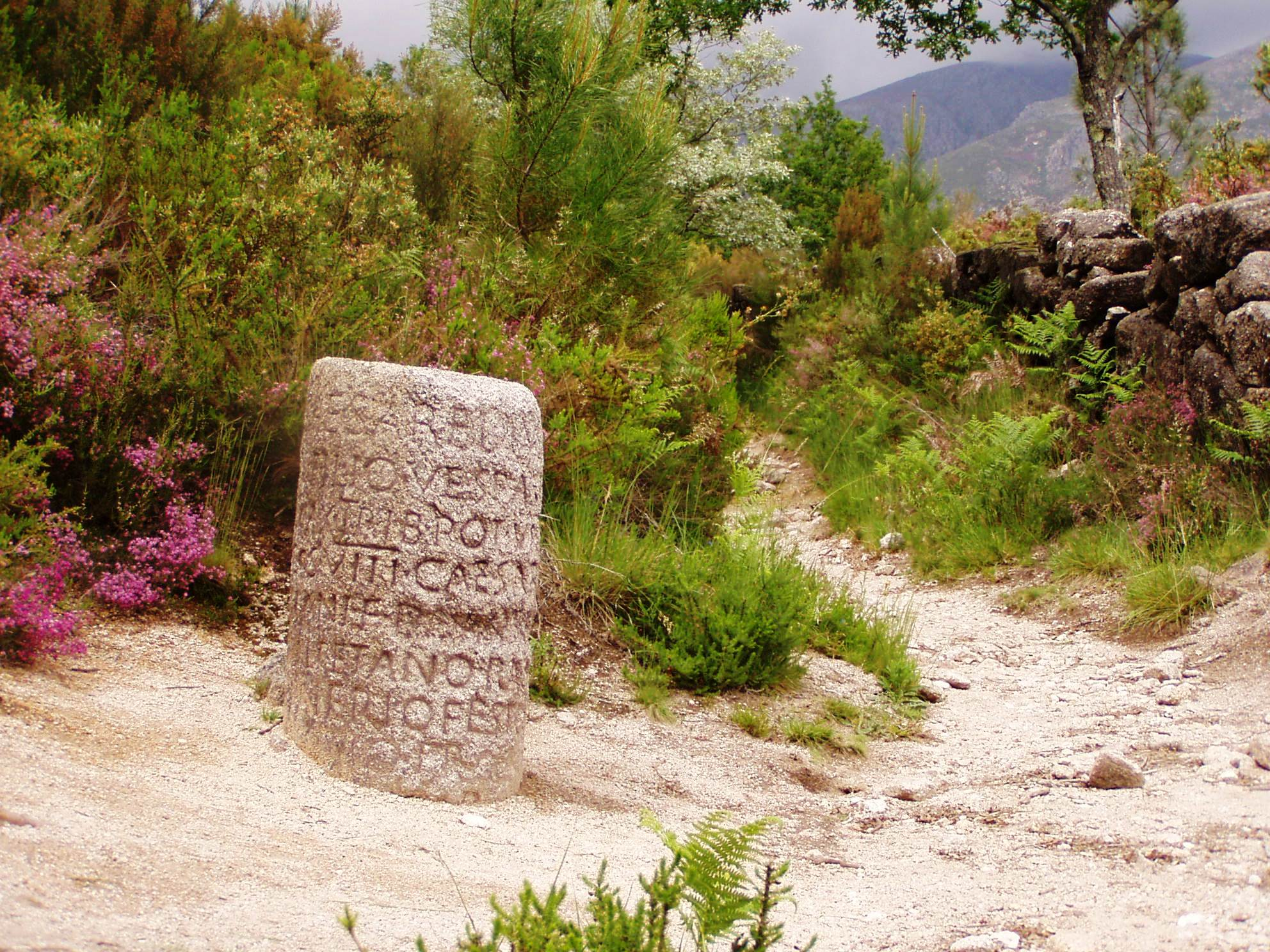
- Milestone XXIX from the Via Romana XVIII, which connected Bracara Augusta to Asturica Augusta. Roadside with milestone.
- Type: Milestones
- Location: Braga, Douro, Norte, Portugal

Site notes
- Owner: Portuguese Republic
- Public access: Public Museum D. Diogo de Sousa

The Roman Milestones of Braga (Portuguese: Marcos Miliários no Concelho de Braga) are a series of ancient road markers located in civil parish of Braga (Maximinos, Sé e Cividade), municipality of Braga in northern Portugal.

== History ==
The Via de Braga a Guimarães was constructed during the period of Romanization of the later-Portuguese territory. Specifically, during the first half of the 1st century, this roadway and associated river raised bridges connected Guimarães and Bracara Augusta (Braga) then one of the most important urban nuclei in the region (called Conventus Bracaraugustanus).

From 41 BC milestones were erected in Braga by masons in the function of various Roman emperors, including Claudius, Nerva, Hadrian, Caracalla, Elagabalus, Maximinus Thrax, Carus, Carinus, Diocletian, Maximian, Galerius, Constantius Chlorus, Magnentius, Constantine and Maximinus Daia.

1. 6 (CIL4750), Claudius, milha IV, Braga, Sé, Carvalheiras
2. 14 (CIL4751), Nerva, Braga, Sé, Carvalheiras
3. 21 (CIL4752), Hadrian, milha XIII, Braga, Sé, Carvalheiras
4. 29 (CIL4753), Caracalla, Braga, Sé, Carvalheiras
5. 30 (CIL4754), Caracalla, Carvalheiras
6. 40 (CIL4768 e 4769), Elagabalus, Braga, Sé, Carvalheiras
7. 41 (CIL4766), Elagabalus, milha III, Braga, Sé, Carvalheiras
8. 43 (CIL4757), Maximian and Maximinus Thrax, Braga, Sé, Carvalheiras
9. 44 (CIL4756), Maximian and Maximinus Thrax, Braga, Sé, Carvalheiras
10. 59 (CIL4860), Carus, Braga, Sé, Carvalheiras
11. 63 (CIL4761), Carinus, milha VI, Braga, Sé, Carvalheiras
12. 67 (inédito), Diocletian, Braga, Sé, Carvalheiras
13. 68 (inédito), Maximian, Braga, Sé, Carvalheiras
14. 70 (inédito), Galerius, Braga, Sé, Carvalheiras
15. 72 (inédito), Constantius Chlorus, Braga, Sé, Carvalheiras
16. 76 (CIL4765), Magnentius, Braga, Sé, Carvalheiras
17. 83 (inédito), Constantine or Constantius Chlorus or Constantine II, Braga, Sé, Carvalheiras
18. 84 (CIL6210), unknown, Marco de Canavezes, Freixo, alongside the church
19. 86 (CIL4758), Maximian and Maximinus Thrax, Braga, Sé, Carvalheiras
20. 100 (inédito), Braga, Sé, Carvalheiras
21. 101 (inédito), Braga, Sé, Carvalheiras, in the estate of Conselheiro Pimentel.

The milestones were essential to the consolidation of the new territorial administration imposed by Rome and the routes served inherent military purposes, while assuring the transport of raw materials (specifically metals) essential to the good performance of the new imperial order.

Many of these milestones were investigated and analyzed by Francisco Martins de G. M. Sarmento (1833–1899) and Albano Belino (1863–1906). A series of milestones that were classified in 1910 by Martins Capela (later known as the Série Capela), in his public examination of milestones of Conventus Bracaraugustanus dating from 1895. In this work, Capela inventoried a group of 21 milestones or fragments (of which there is no evidence from where they were discovered), including 20 encountered in the Campo das Carvalheiras in Braga and one near the Church of Freixo, in Marco de Canavezes.

There discovery and analysis resulted in an ample campaign by the Conselho Superior dos Monumentos Nacionaes (National Monuments Superior Council), then attached to the Ministerio das Obras Publicas, Commercio e Industria (Ministry of Public Works, Commercial and Industry), that was involved in cataloguing the artistic and archaeological patrimony. These efforts resulted in its inclusion on a list of national monuments, that were then classified in 1910.

== Architecture ==
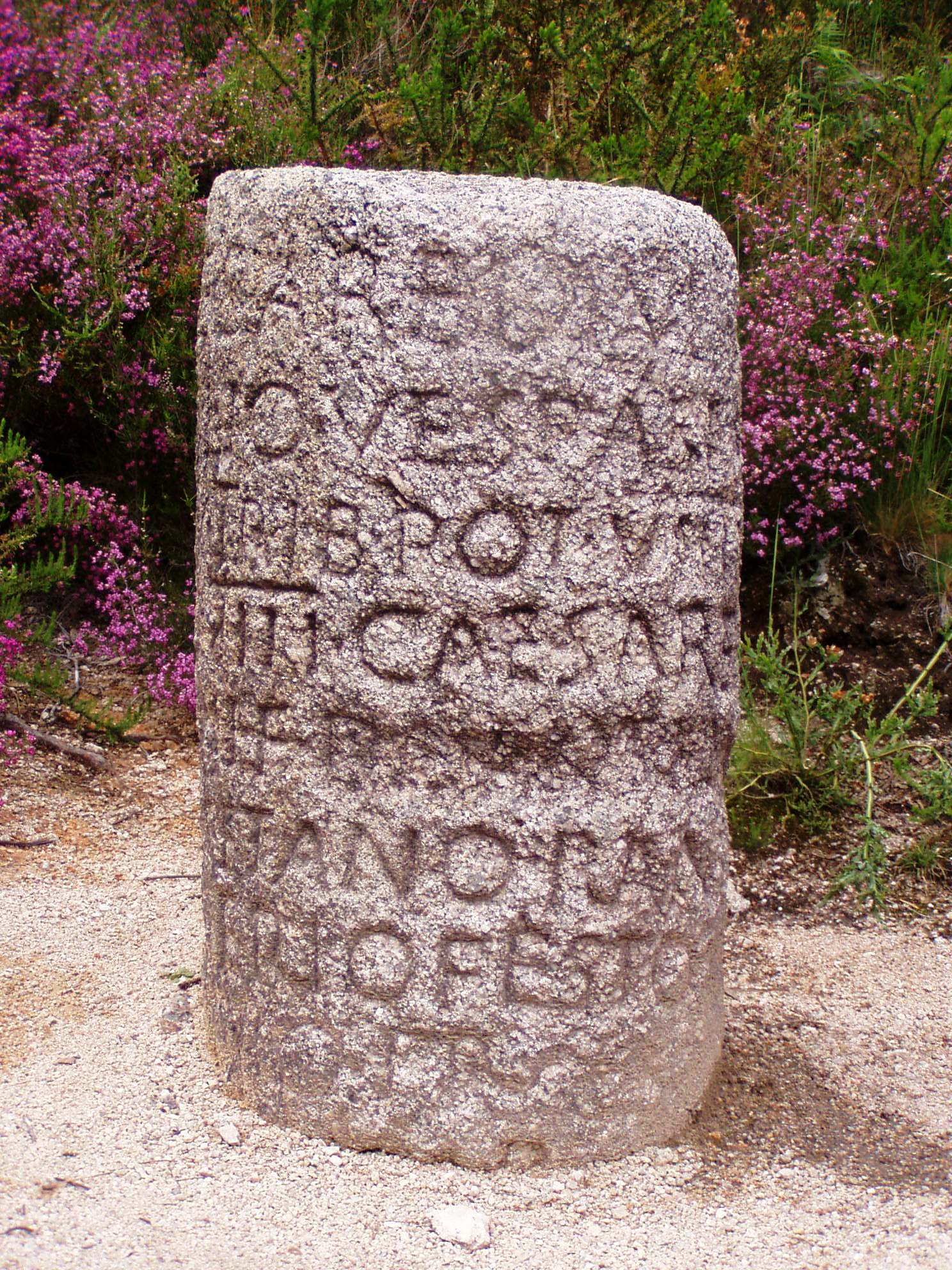
Milestone XXIX from the Via Romana XVIII, which connected Bracara Augusta to Asturica Augusta

Examples of the Roman milestones are housed in the installations of the Museum D. Diogo de Sousa.

In the territory the milestones are various heights and diameters, in various locations (such as the Passeio das Carvalheiras and Rua dos Bombeiros Voluntários, from various epochs.
