= Castle of Braga =

Historical fortification around the city of Braga, Portugal

- Castelo de Braga
- Braga, Cávado, Norte in Portugal
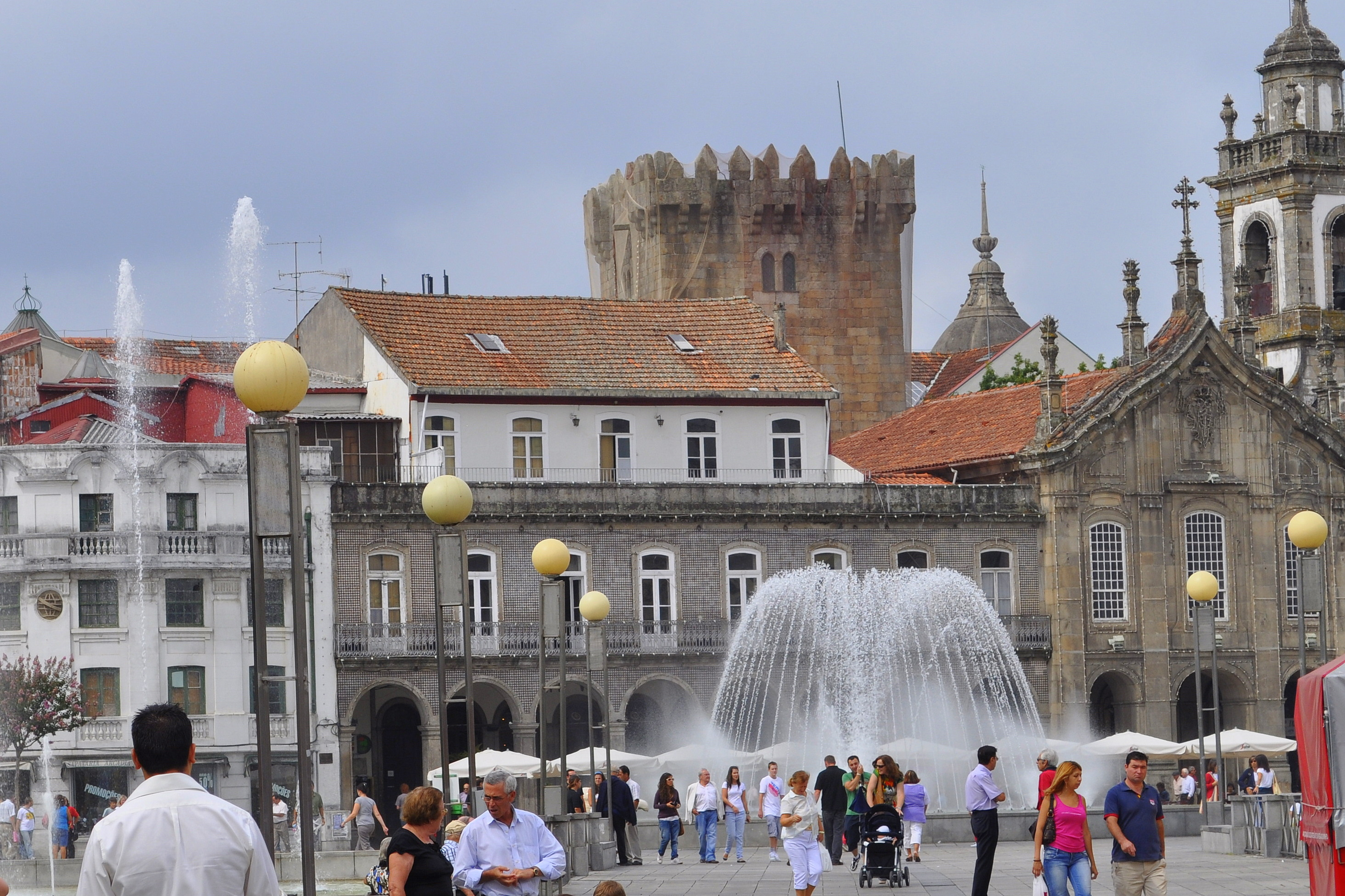
- The remnants of the Castle of Braga, the Keep Tower, peeking out from behind the buildings of the Avenida Central in Braga

Site information
- Type: Castle
- Owner: Portuguese Republic
- Operator: Associação para a Defesa, Estudo e Divulgação do Património Cultural e Natural (ASPA)
- Open to the public: Private

Location
- Coordinates: 41°33′4.72″N 8°25′25.82″W

Site history
- Built: 2nd Century
- Materials: Granite, Wood, Tile

Castle of Braga (Portuguese: Castelo de Braga) is a historical fortification and defensive line encircling the city of Braga. While, in fact, the only remains of this structure are the various gates and towers along its perimeter, the main keep tower, located in the civil parish of São João do Souto, is the only true remnant of the medieval castle.

The old castle, today demolished, had an approximate rectangular plan, with towers on each vertex. Of the walls of the city, only the gate, tower of Santiago, tower of São Sebastião and Porta Nova remain (the latter being completely remodeled in a Rococo style and completely different stylistically).

Its perimeter barely exceeded 2,000 metres (6,600 ft), and was delimited (today) in the east by the Praça da República, west by the Rua do Castelo (keep and castle), Rua de São Marcos, Rua do Anjo, Largo de Santiago, Rua do Alcaide, Largo de Paulo Orósio, Rua de Jerónimo Pimentel, Campo das Carvalheiras, Avenida de São Miguel o Anjo, Largo da Porta Nova, Rua dos Biscainhos, Praça do Conselheiro Torres e Almeida and Rua dos Capelistas (walls).

The demolition of the grounds began in 1858 in the Largo do Barão de S. Martinho, with the destruction of the Souto Gate, followed by the Eastern and São Bento Gates, still in the 19th century. After the beginning of the 20th century, many other lines of the castle were destroyed between the Arco da Porta Nova and Rua dos Biscainhos, and from Rua dos Biscainhos and Rua do Alcaide (whose houses abutted the wall, between Campo da Vinha and Praça do Município and Rua de São Marcos). Few remnants of the medieval lines remain today. The ancient wall can be seen in some of the backyards of homes along the Rua do Anjo and Rua de São Marcos. Still, further, there still exists the Gate of São Tiago, even if partially altered due to the construction in the second half of the 18th century, through the addition of the Capela da Senhora da Torre. Along Rua de São Marcos, in 1985, one property owner constructed over the foundations of one part of the wall, while in March 1990, there was a collapse of one part of the ancient wall, during the demolition of the old Facho garment factory.

== History ==
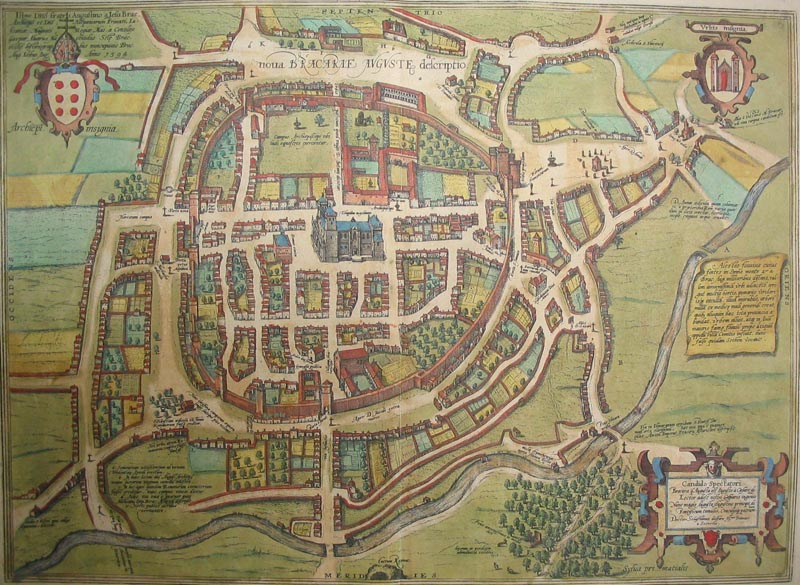
A medieval map showing the concentric ring of the city walls and keep towers

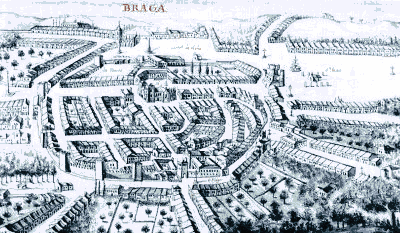
A 17th-century engraving of the walled city of Braga

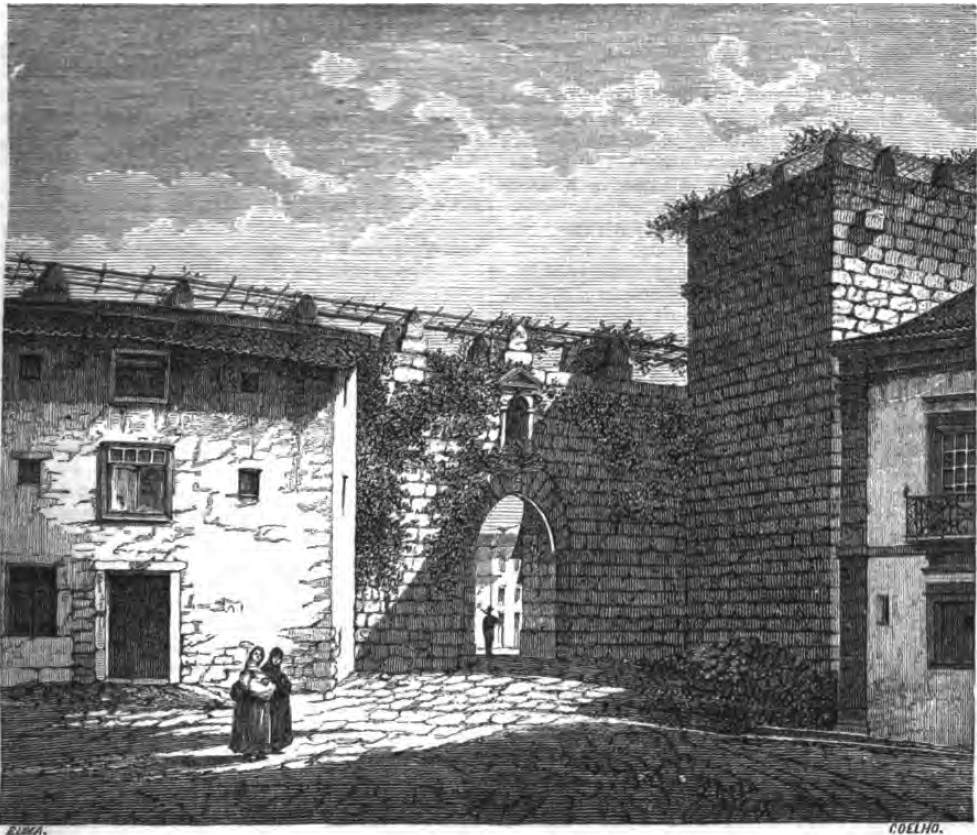
A 19th-century engraving of gate and tower of the castle

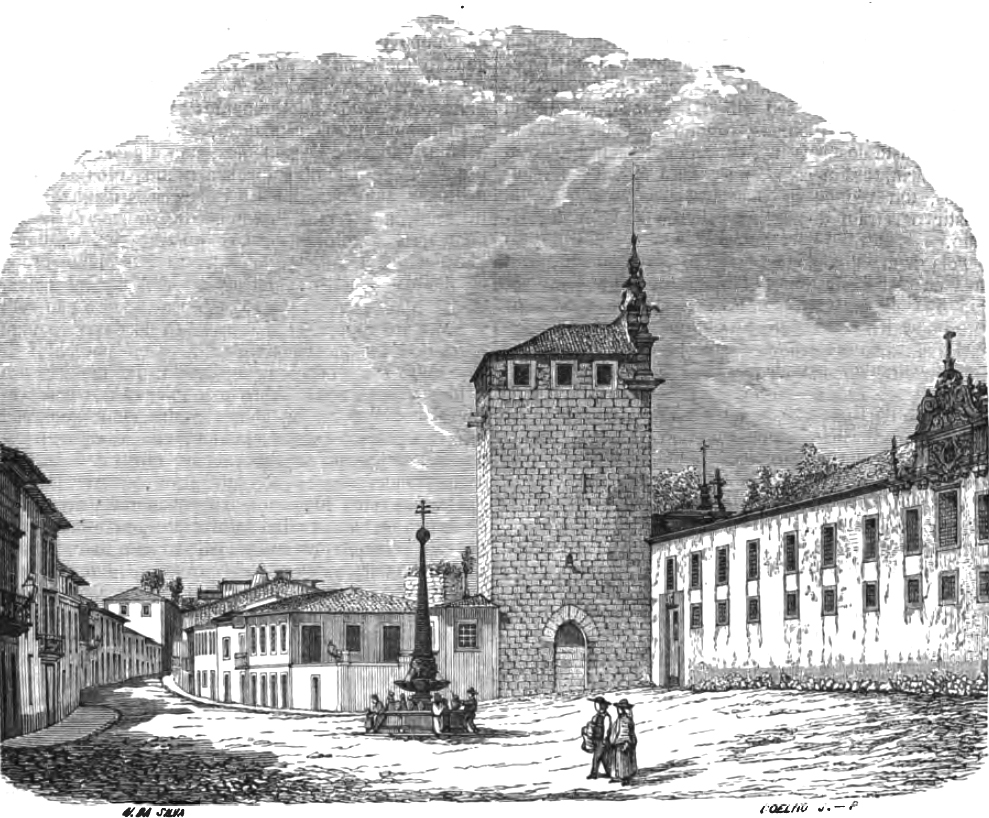
A similar 19th century engraving of the Largo de São Tiago showing the main castle tower

Writing in the mid-2nd century, the Greek astronomer and geographer Ptolemy wrote that Bracara Augusta had been under Roman rule. Archaeological work completed researchers from the University of Minho discovered a defensive wall, consisting of polygonal plan, reinforced by small semi-circular turrets, dating to the 3rd century. Recent information points to polygonal plan, defined by rectilinear lines that crossed the structure, with an area between 40 and 50 hectares, punctuated by semi-circular towers . During the period of Iberian migration, the Suebi chose Bracara Augusta as the capital of their kingdom due to its strategic importance and settlement. However, the early settlements floundered with successive conquest, under the Visigothic tribes, southern Moorish invaders and the Christian Reconquista of the Kingdom of León.

=== Medieval ===
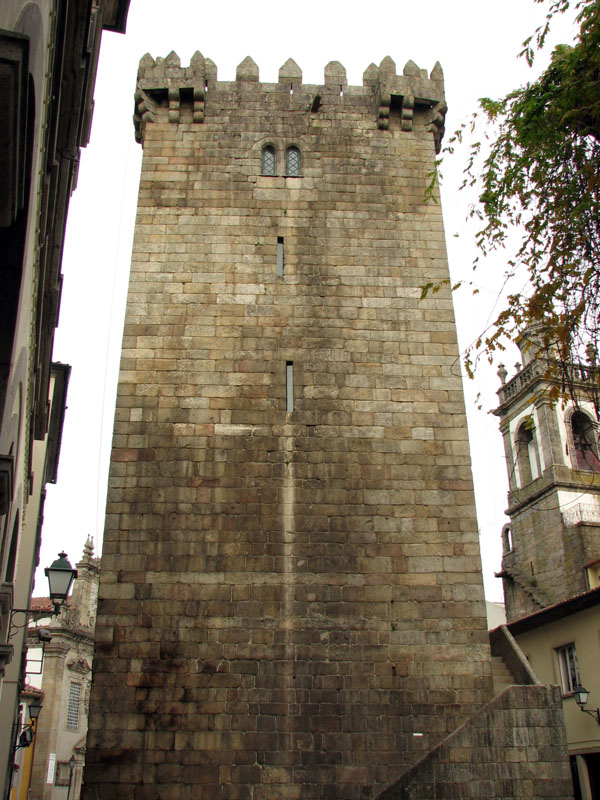
The main remnant of the Castle, the keep tower (Portuguese: Torre de Menagem)

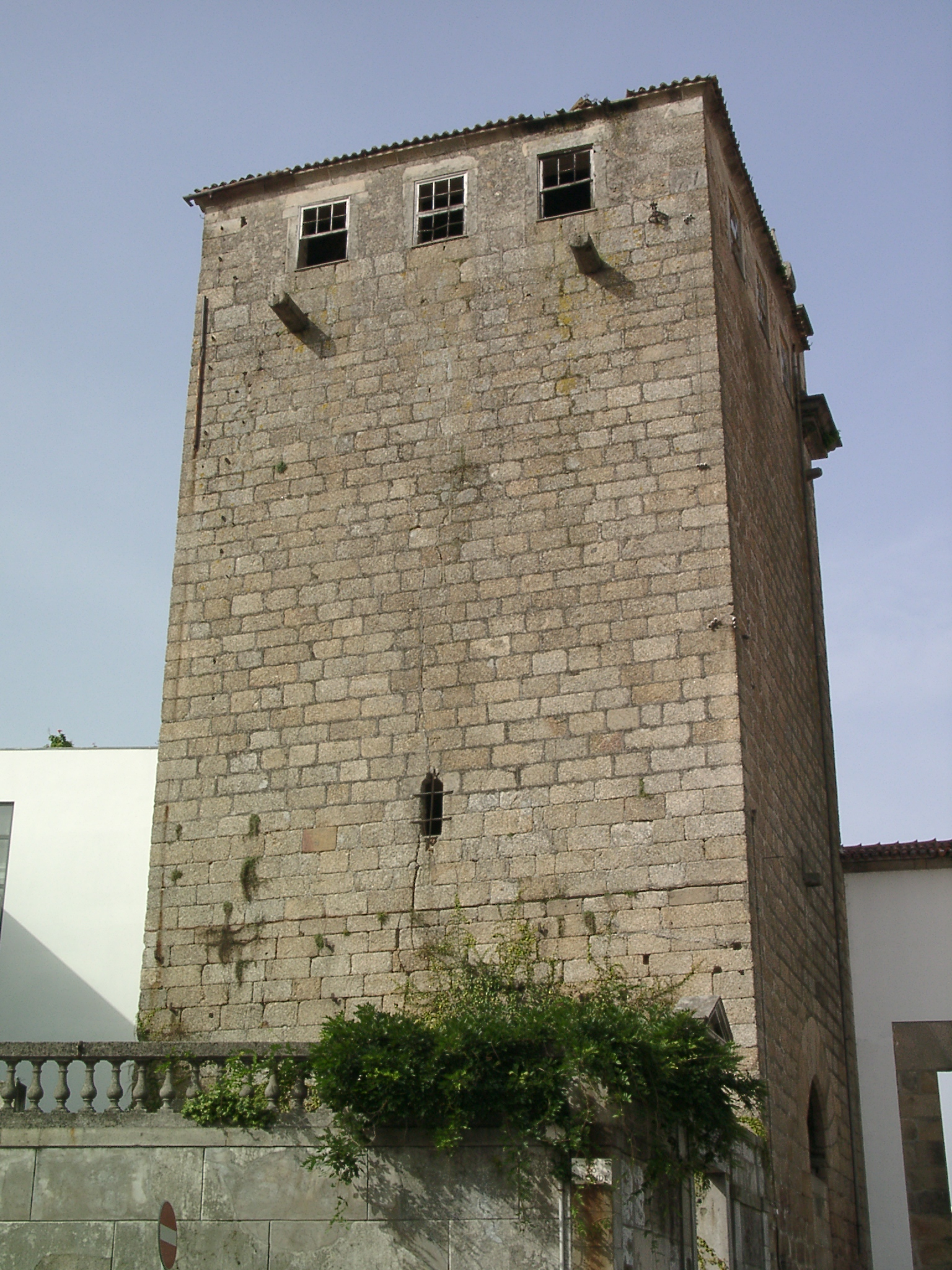
The Torre de São Tiago (Tower of Saint James)

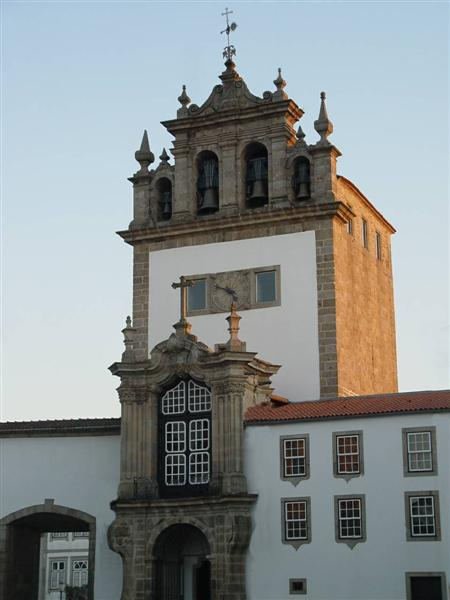
The Chapel of Senhora da Torre (Our Lady of the Tower), constructed by the Jesuits

Although reliable information about the evolution of Braga's early defences is lacking, it is known that, from the 11th century, a second wall was under construction, to the south and to the west, complementing the old Roman wall in the north. Furthermore, it is known that in 1145, Archbishop John of Braga promised the Knights Templar an imposing house within the city walls.

The first documented reference to a walled keep occurred on 12 June 1161, in a transfer to the Church of São João do Souto, that included the walled spaces, and which passed metres from the Sé Cathedral. Around 1210, the walled compound was likely expanded, since documented references referred to road and gate of Souto.

It was in 1300, that King Denis ordered the construction of the castle, as noted by Monseigneur José Augusto Ferreira, and a year later the budget was applied to the project. In 15 years, the first documented reference to the new castle appeared, but by 1350, under the reign of King Pedro I the project had not yet been completed: the king ordered the use of residuals for the work on a new wall, abandoning the old Roman line of defenses in the north.

Between 1369 and 1371, during the first battles of the Ferdinand Wars between Castile and forces of King Ferdinand, Henry II of Castile took the city, which was then "a great place, but badly circled, with only one tower". When Henry finally abandoned the castle, he order the city be put to flame. The tomb of Cabido, then referred to Porta do Muro, which was also named the São tiago da Cavidade.

King Ferdinand restored the wall in 1378, adding three towers to the perimeter defenses. By 1380, three master masons continued to work on the site (João Mouro, Pero Senascais, or Senaschais, and João Pedreiro). Yet, by 31 August 1398, the archbishop D. Martinho Pires da Charneca obtained license from King John I to repair the castle and nominate an alcalde. By 20 November, of the same year, the same archbishop solicited Cabido 2000 corner stones from the tower of Quintã de Carapeços for public work on the castle and archiepiscopal. But, by 1400, even those concessions were not enough for the project, necessitating the order by the archbishop to bring all stone that was encountered in the outskirts of the city for the construction. As of 10 February 1402, the jurisdiction and defences were transferred to the archbishops by the Crown. After a feud with the Cantor of the Sé Cathedral, on the free transfer of the stone, from the tower of Carapeços, the king sent stone free-of-charge from the older buildings whose restoration was not likely to be concluded.

On 20 December 1421, the king determined that the Moorish residents that did not respect the contract between the prelate, cabido and population, should be obliged to pay 100 reis fine, which was then applied to the construction of the walls. Yet, even by the Cortes of Lisbon (1446), the Bracarense procurators continued to complain that the population continued to pay for the city walls, whose construction was suspended. They attributed these complaints to the King's uncle, Afonso, 1st Duke of Braganza, who was the project's comptroller, and public works in the comarca of Entre Douro e Minho. Between 1456 and 1459, during the Cortes of Lisbon, there was a new denunciation against the uncompleted project, whose budget had already been squandered. As the walls began to deteriorate, the blame fell to Aires Ferreira, a squire in the House of the Duke of Braganza.

These continued problems forced King Afonso V on 12 March 1472, to restore the authority over the city and jurisdiction to archbishop Luís Pires. Inevitably, the Church began the reconstruction of the defenses; by 1477, the wall tower, alongside the Gate of São Tiago, was already underway, requiring the collection of taxes on the sale of properties in the city. Between 1505 and 1532, archbishop Diogo de Sousa ordered the construction of the Porta Nova. Already around 1594, the map of Braga included the distinctive image of the castle and wall at its maximum extent.

Sometime in the 17th century, Archbishop José de Bragança reconstructed the Porta Nova gate, which was extended with Rococo arch/decoration in 1773, becoming known as the Arco da Porta Nova.

After the 1755 Lisbon earthquake, the Jesuits altered the tower alongside the Gate of São Tiago, constructing the Chapel of the Our Lady of the Tower (Portuguese: Capela da Senhora da Torre).

The demolish of the walls began around 1858, starting around the Largo do Barão de São Martinho with the destruction of the Souto Gate, and progressing, around 1867, to the Gate of São Marcos (or São João).

=== Republic ===
The destruction of the castle and walls continued to 1905 when the jailhouse (installed in the castle) was demolished, while the keep tower was spared.

On 23 June 1910, a decree classified the keep and some sections of the medieval wall as a National Monument. The Direcção Geral dos Edifícios e Monumentos Nacionais (DGMEN) began the first efforts to recuperate the Castle's remains in 1942–1943, with remodelling of the keep tower, roofing the space and coverage, assessment of pavements, replacement of doors and frames, the clearing of space around the courtyard, including the demolition of existing local structures, and replacing cornerstones that were damaged.

In 1956, the roof was repaired, including the substitution of broken tiles, repairs to the battlements, frames, and substitution of broken windows, while another group of public works was made to transition the structure for reuse, such as the installation of an electrical system, arrangement and painting of the door, construction of a new staircase, and the re-landscaping of the terrain around it, including leveling the terrain, paving with gravel and planting flowerbeds. The tower, thus, became the headquarters for the Delegação da Sociedade Histórica da Independência de Portugal (Delegation of the Historical Society of Portuguese Independence) in 1957. A year later, on the celebration of the commemorations associated with the establishment of the Portuguese monarchy (Portuguese: Comemorações Henriquinas), the Portuguese Mocidade erected a commemorative plaque alongside the tower.

New landscaping around the keep tower occurred in 1971, which resulted in the placement of pavement stone, and installation of exterior illumination.

The association ASPA settled in the keep tower in 1982, sharing the space with the Historical Society.

On 29 September 1996, the keep's machicolations were destroyed. As a result, there was an expanded attempt to recuperate, clean, and repair existing damage to the site, which included: the repair of the roofing, including reinforcement of existing structures; the placement of an undulating asphalt sub-tile and then re-tiling the coverage; repair to the trapdoor access to the battlement with a metal structure; repairs to the interior and exterior parapets; treatment of cracks and joints; weather-proofing of the battlements; repairs to all staircases, pavements, landings, handrails, and tiling floors; the repair of the main gate, execution of a second gate in glass, replacement of windows and frames; and the substitution of the electrical system.

== Architecture ==
From the 13th century, the city walls had an approximately circular plan. A combination of archaeological evidence and documents allows for the walls' general lines to be reconstructed, but the exact location of the gates (of which there were at least four) and the towers are unknown. Beginning at the Arco da Porta Nova (an 18th-century construction that replaced one of the older gates), the wall followed north-northeast along the Rua dos Biscainhos (its northernmost extent being the Campo da Vinha) and looped around southeast along the Rua dos Capelistas, touching the castle wall. After which, the walls continued southwest and then south, northwest and again north, passing through the Campo e Torre de São Tiago, the Largo das Carvalheiras, and the Largo de São Miguel-o-Anjo, before returning to the Arco da Porta Nova.

=== Keep ===
The principal remnants of the Castle, the keep tower, is located in the centre of the historic city of Braga, encircled by various buildings which were constructed in the spaces of the demolished castle. It is situated on the fringes of the building of the Escola Comercial e Industrial Bartolomeu dos Mártires and in proximity to the Church of the Third Order of Saint Francis (Portuguese: Igreja dos Terceiros).

Of the old castle only the keep tower (Portuguese: Torre de Menagem) remains, consisting of a rectangular footprint and vertical block covered in tile. The façades are built in granite masonry that is slightly staggered closer to the ground. The design is trimmed with chamfered merlons, battlements with gargoyles and machicolations to the corners. It is four stories, or approximately 30 metres (98 ft) in height, with the first floor considerably taller than the remaining: it is about 12 metres (39 ft)tall. This section is marked by grooves where other buildings abutted the structure, some stones with identifiable inscriptions.

On the first floor, to the northeast, is an arched door that gives access to the interior. A staircase, consisting of two flights, provides egress to the intermediary landing. The door is surmounted by a coat-of-arms of the king Denis, which is also repeated in the western façade of the tower. There are cracks on the second and third floors towards the southeast façade. The roof includes arched windows along each of the façades, with the southeast and northwest twinned.

The interior of the tower is divided into individual spaces on each floor, linked by wooden staircase, with parquet floors and wooden ceilings.
