= Viscount of Paço de Nespereira =

The Viscount of Paço de Nespereira (Visconde de Paço de Nespereira) is a Portuguese title bestowed by King Luís I of Portugal in 1886 to a member of the Lobo Machado family, Gaspar de Sousa Lobo Machado, 9th Lord of Santão, even though the lordship of Paço de Nespereira was traditionally of held in the hands of the Amaral-Cardoso-de-Menezes clan.

== History ==
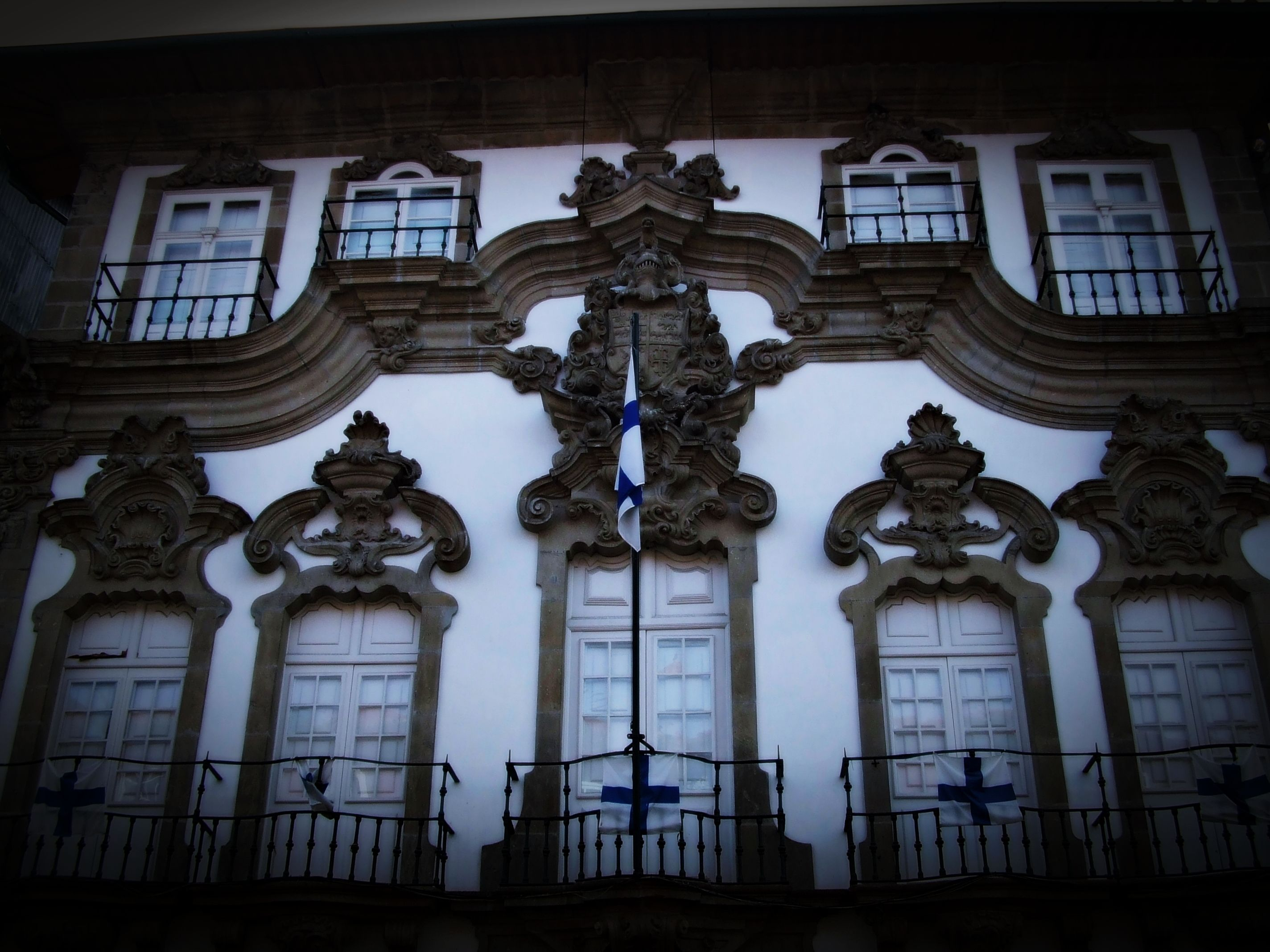
Palace of the Lobo Machado family in Guimarães

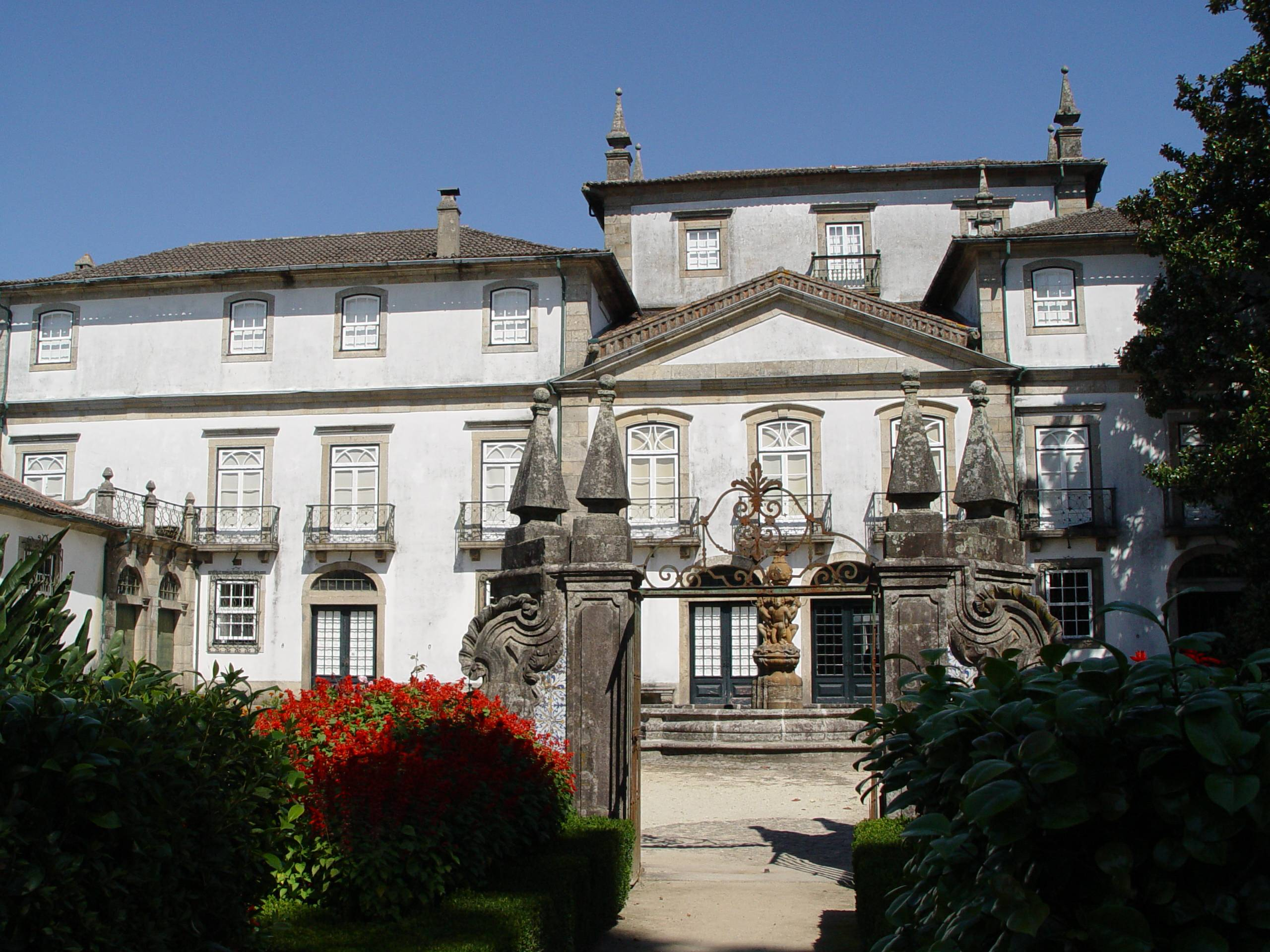
Palace of Biscainhos in Braga

The lordship of Paço de Nespereira can be traced to the Middle Ages, to the Amaral-Cardoso-de-Menezes family. In 1538, King John III provided Pedro Cardoso do Amaral (and by extent his family) the hereditary title, to the contador-mor of the Kingdom, an agnate descendant of the royal family of the Kingdom of León. The hereditary seat of the Viscounts of Paço de Nespereira is the medieval Paço de Nespereira, an estate and gardens in the civil parish of Nespereira, municipality of Guimarães. It was only in the second half of the 16th century, the Paço de Nespereira began bearing the family shield over the main doorway (sometime around 1560).

In 1886, the title of viscount of Paço de Nespereira was granted to Gaspar Lobo de Sousa Machado e Couros, married to heir to the Majorat, D. Maria Amélia do Carmo de Menezes, daughter of the first Viscount of Pindela and D. Maria Amélia Barreto do Amaral.

During the 19th century, the clan was the "first family" of Guimarães nobility, both because of its wealth and connections to the nobility of the region. In the beginning of the 19th century, Lord Fortunato do Amaral-Cardoso-de-Menezes (then 15th Lord of Paço de Nespereira) fought on the side of King Miguel, during the Liberal Wars. This option eventually induced him to marry his only daughter and heiress, Maria do Carmo, to the son of another leading noble of the region, the Viscount of Pindela.

At the same time, the Lordship of Santão, in the municipality of Felgueiras, was one of the biggest estates in the region in the 14th century. Belonging, initially, to the Sousa clan by marriage, it became part of the Lobo Machado properties (including the Lobo Machado Palace/Residence), and by extent the family of the 1st Viscount of Paço de Nespereira.

In addition, the Viscounts of Paço de Nespereira's residence in Braga is the Palace of Biscainhos, a monumental manor in the center of the city, in addition to the Palace of Lobo Machado in Guimarães and the estate of Proposto outside of Guimarães. The Lobo Machado Palace, as well as the Santão estate were inherited by the younger son of the first viscount who inherited the title of Lord of Santão.

== List of viscounts ==
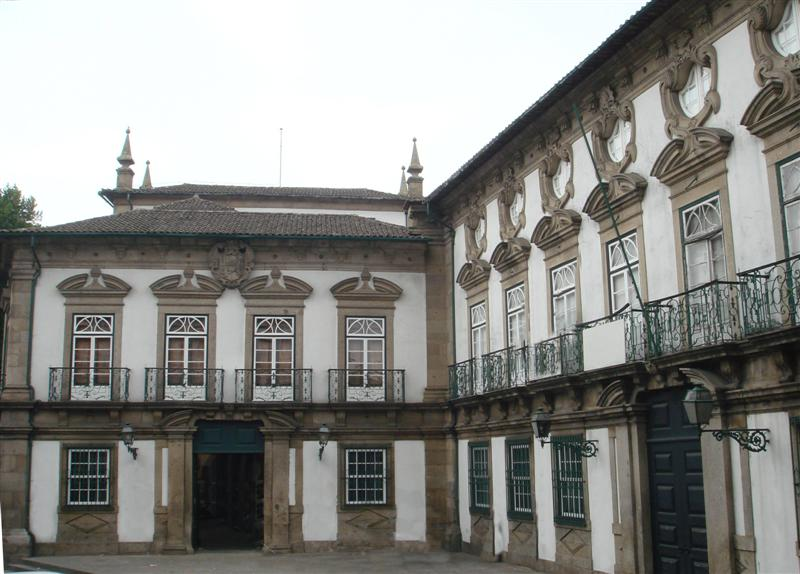
Palace of Biscainhos, of the Viscounts of Paço de Nespereira, Braga

1. Gaspar Lobo Machado, 1st Viscount of Paço de Nespereira, Lord of Santão, who as the leader of the Guimarães' nobility was created Viscount in 1886 by the King Luís I. He married Lady Maria Amélia Pinheiro de Mello (daughter of the Viscount of Pindella) and heiress to the House of Paço de Nespereira. In order to preserve the position of the Lord of Paço de Nespereira's family, as there was no heir, the King created Viscount the husband of the granddaughter of the last Lord of Paço de Nespereira, Fortunato. He had three sons that included: Rodrigo Lobo Machado, Pedro Lobo Machado (Lord of Santão), and;
2. João Lobo Machado do Amaral-Cardoso-de-Menezes, who married Lady Maria da Conceição Pereira da Silva, daughter of the Earl and Countess of Bertiandos;
3. Gaspar Lobo Machado do Amaral-Cardoso-de-Menezes, who married Lady Maria Adelaide Menezes (daughter of the Earl of Guarda)

=== Ancestors ===
Ancestry of the third Viscount of Paço de Nespereira

Ancestors of Viscount of Paço de Nespereira

16. Simão Lobo Machado, 7th Lord of Santão
8. Rodrigo Lobo Machado, 8º Lord of Santão
17. Lady Rita Correia de Sá
4. Gaspar Lobo Machado, 1st Viscount of Paço de Nespereira
18. Lord Tomás Assis de Mascarenhas
9. Lady Clara de Faria
19. Rosário de Almeida
2. João Lobo Machado, 2nd Viscount of Paço de Nespereira
20. Vicente Machado Pinheiro de Mello, Lord of Pindella
10. João Machado Pinheiro de Mello, 1st Viscount of Pindella
21. Lady Carlota de Almada de Moraes e Castro
5. Lady Maria Amélia Pinheiro de Mello
22. Fortunato Cardoso do Amaral de Menezes, 13th Lord of Paço de Nespereira
11. Lady Maria do Carmo Cardoso de Menezes do Amaral
23. Maria Rita Macedo Salgado
1. Gaspar Lobo Machado, 3rd Viscount of Paço de Nespereira
24. Luis Brandão de Melo Pereira de Lacerda e Menezes
12. José Maria Brandão de Melo Cogominho Correia Pereira de Lacerda, Earl of Terena
25. Antónia de Portugal e Menezes
6. Sebastião Correia de Sá, Earl of Bertiandos
26. Sebastião Correia de Sá, 1st Marquis of Terena
13. Lady Maria Emília Jácome Correia de Sá, 2nd Countess of Terena, 2nd Viscountess of São Gil de Perre
27. Francisca Jácome do Lago Bezerra, 1ª Countess of São Gil de Perre
3. Lady Maria da Conceição Eugénea Pereira da Silva
28. Damião Pereira da Silva, Lord of Bertiandos
14. Gonçalo Pereira da Silva, 1st Earl of Bertiandos
29. Maria Angelina Pereira Forjaz de Eça Montenegro, Lady of Bertiandos
7. Lady Joana Maria Pereira da Silva, 2nd Countess de Bertiandos
30. Fernando Teles da Silva, 3rd Marquis of Penalva
15. Lady Teresa Teles da Silva
31. Lady Joana de Almeida Lavradio
