= Braga (Maximinos, Sé e Cividade) =

- Civil parish
- Location in Portugal
- Coordinates: 41.546°N 8.432°W
- Country: Portugal
- Region: Norte
- Intermunic. comm.: Cávado
- District: Braga
- Municipality: Braga

Area
  - Total: 2.57 km^{2} (0.99 sq mi)

Population (2011)
  - Total: 14,572
  - Density: 5,700/km^{2} (15,000/sq mi)
- Time zone: UTC+00:00 (WET)
  - Summer (DST): UTC+01:00 (WEST)

Braga (Maximinos, Sé e Cividade) is a civil parish in the municipality of Braga, Portugal. It was formed in 2013 by the merger of the former parishes Maximinos, Sé and Cividade. The population in 2011 was 14,572, in an area of 2.57 km^{2}.

== Architecture ==
=== Archeological ===
- Roman Milestones of Braga (Portuguese: Marcos Miliários no Concelho de Braga)
- Roman Ruins of Carvalheiras (Portuguese: Insula de Bracara Augusta/Ruínas romanas das Carvalheiras)
- Roman Thermae of Maximinus (Portuguese: Termas Romanas de Maximinos/Alto da Cividade/Colina dos Maximinos), the archaeological ruins of a monumental building and public baths, whose construction was integrated into the urban renewal of the civitas of Bracara Augusta

=== Civic ===
- (First) Sé Primary School (Portuguese: Escola Primária da Sé/Escola Básica do 1.º Ciclo da Sé n.º 6)
- Biscainhos Museum (Portuguese: Casa dos Biscainhos/Museu dos Biscainhos)
- Cruz Bookstore (Portuguese: Livraria Cruz)
- Estate of Naia (Portuguese: Quinta e Casa da Naia)
- Fountain of Alameda (Portuguese: Fonte da Alameda)
- Fountain of Campo das Hortas (Portuguese: Chafariz do Campo das Hortas)
- Fountain of Pelican (Portuguese: Fonte do Pelicano)
- Fountain of Santiago (Portuguese: Fonte de Santiago)
- Fountain of São Marco (Portuguese: Fonte dos Granjinhos/Fonte de São Marcos)
- Fountain of São Tiago (Portuguese: Fonte Seiscentista de São Tiago)
- Fountain Rua Andrade Corvo (Portuguese: Fontanário da Rua Andrade Corvo)
- Manorhouse of São Sebastião (Portuguese: Solar na Rua de São Sebastião)
- Maximos School Centre (Portuguese: Escola Primária n.º 9 de Maximinos/Centro Escolar de Maximinos)
- Municipal Palace of Braga (Portuguese: Câmara Municipal de Braga/Paço do Concelho de Braga)
- Palace of the Falcões (Portuguese: Palácio dos Falcões/Governo Civil de Braga)
- Pillory of Braga (Portuguese: Pelourinho de Braga)
- Portuguese War Veterans Association Building (Portuguese: Dispensário da Assistência Nacional aos Tuberculosos, IANT, de Braga/Edifício da Associação Portuguesa dos Veteranos de Guerra)
- Residence of Avelar (Portuguese: Casa do Avelar)
- Residence of Cunha Reis (Portuguese: Casa Grande/Casa Cunha Reis)
- Residence of Orge (Portuguese: Casa da Orge)
- Residence of Senhora da Torre (Portuguese: Casa da Senhora da Torre)
- Residence of Santa Cruz do Igo (Portuguese: Casa de Santa Cruz do Igo)
- Residence of Roda (Portuguese: Casa dos Paivas/Casa da Roda)
- Residence Pimental (Portuguese: Casa Oitocentista/Casa Pimentel
- Santa Casa da Misericórida (Portuguese: Edifício e Igreja da Santa Casa da Misericórdia de Braga)
- Work Court of Braga (Portuguese: Tribunal de Trabalho de Braga)

=== Religious ===
- Cathedral of Braga and Cathedral Treasure Museum (Portuguese: Catedral de Braga/Sé de Braga)
- Chapel of São Miguel-o-Anjo (Portuguese: Capela de São Miguel-o-Anjo)
- Chapel of São Sebastião das Carvalheiras (Portuguese: Capela de São Sebastião das Carvalheiras)
- Chapel of Senhor da Agonia (Portuguese: Capela do Senhor da Agonia)
- Chapel of Senhor das Ânsias (Portuguese: Capela do Senhor das Ânsias)
- Church of São Tiago (Portuguese: Igreja Paroquial da Cividade/Igreja de São Tiago)
- College Chapel of the Ôrfãos de São Caetano (Portuguese: Capela do Colégio dos Órfãos de São Caetano)
- Convent of Nossa Senhora da Conceição (Portuguese: Convento de Nossa Senhora da Conceição/Colégio da Regeneração/Instituto Monsenhor Airosa)
- Cross of Campo das Hortas (Portuguese: Cruzeiro do Campo das Hortas)
- Monastery of Visitação de Santa Maria (Portuguese: Mosteiro da Visitação de Santa Maria)
- Patronate of Nossa Senhora da Torre (Portuguese: Edifício do Patronato de Nossa Senhora da Torre)
- Seminary of São Pedro e São Paulo (Portuguese: Colégio de São Paulo/Igreja de São Paulo e Seminário de Santiago/Seminário Conciliar de São Pedro e São Paulo)
