= Arco da Porta Nova =

Arch of the New Gate
- Arco da Porta Nova
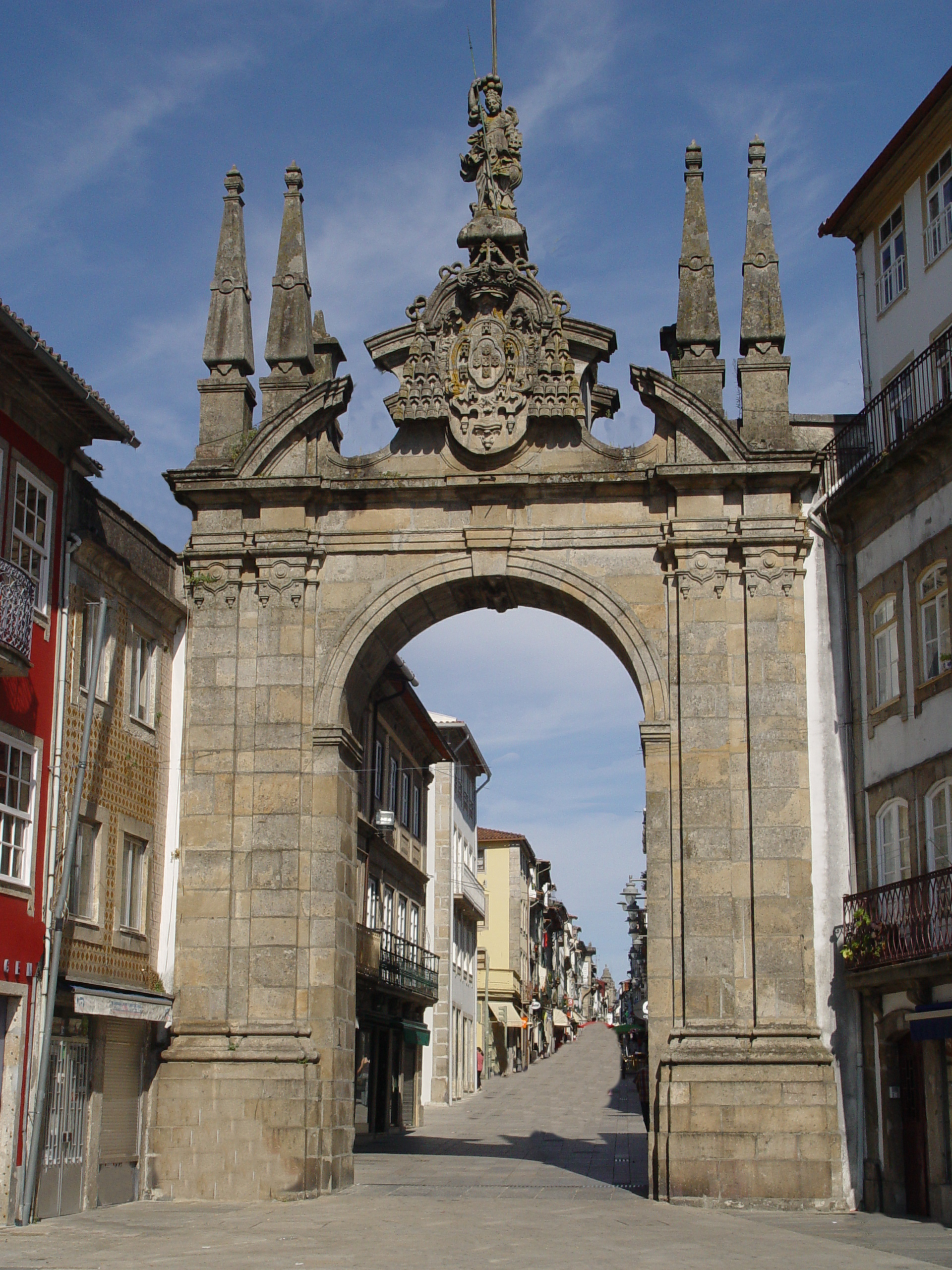
- The front façade of the arch, looking east along the Rua do D. Diogo de Sousa

General information
- Type: Gate
- Location: Sé, Portugal
- Coordinates: 41°33′0.95″N 8°25′45.51″W
- Opened: c. 1373
- Owner: Portuguese Republic

Design and construction
- Architect: André Soares

The Arch of the New Gate (Portuguese: Arco da Porta Nova) is a Baroque and Neoclassical arch, designed by André Soares in the late 18th century, in the civil parish of Sé, municipality of Braga, in northern Portugal.

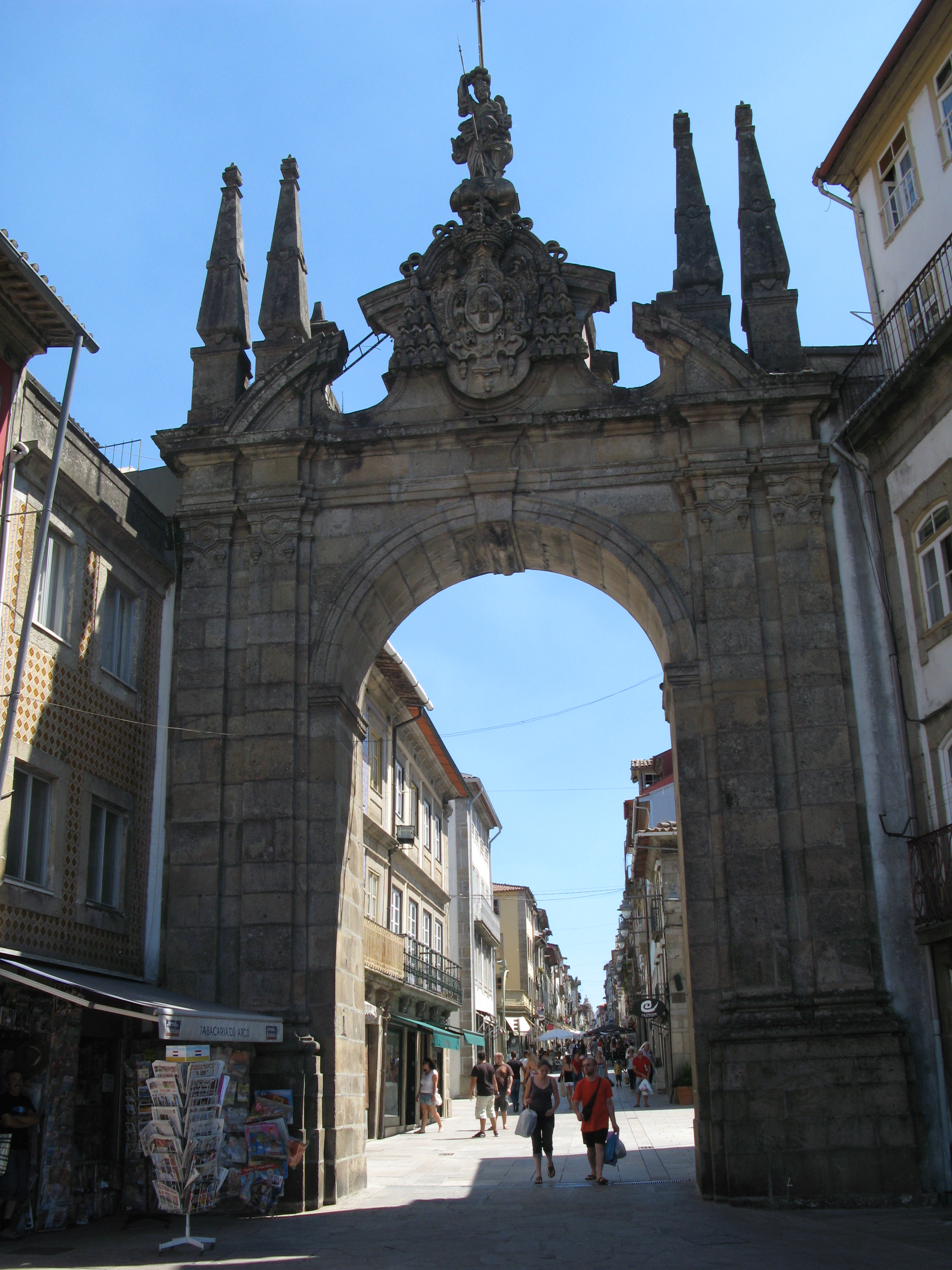
The western façade of the Arco da Porta Nova

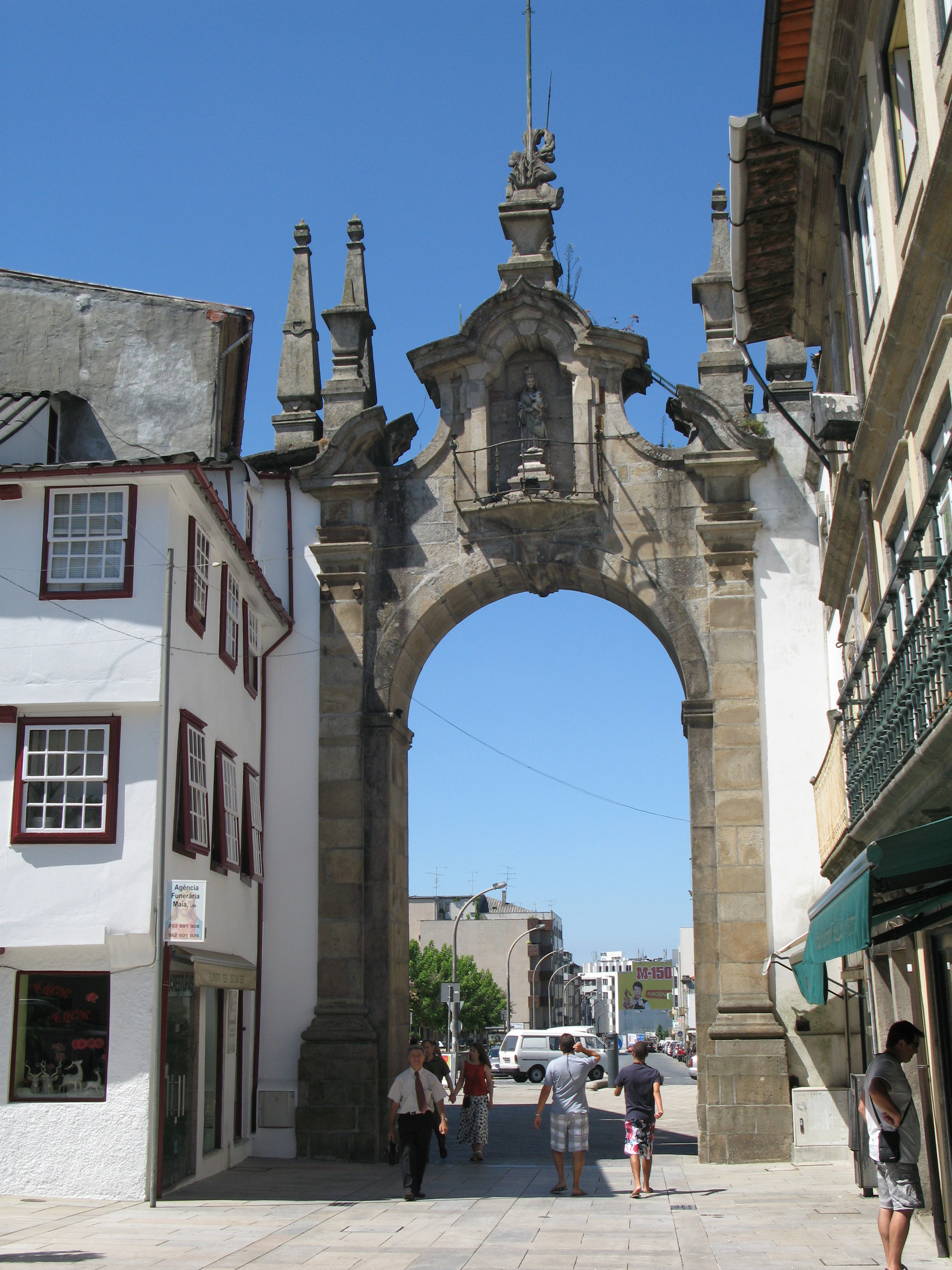
The eastern façade with the image of Our Lady of Nazareth

== Sources ==
- Almeida, José António Ferreira (1976), Tesouros Artísticos de Portugal (in Portuguese), Lisbon, Portugal
- Dionísio, Santana (1986), Guia de Portugal (in Portuguese), vol. 4, Coimbra, Portugal
- Oliveira, Jorge (22 September 2004), "Praça da República – Mais conhecida por Arcada", Diário do Minho (in Portuguese)
