= Hatun charango =

Peruvian musical instrument

Hatun Charango
String instrument
- Other names: Grand Charango
- Classification: String instrument
- Hornbostel–Sachs classification: (Composite chordophone)
- Developed: 2001 in Lima, Peru

Playing range
- A3-C7

Related instruments
- Charango, Ronrocco, Walyacho, Chillador

The hatun charango (Quechua: "grand charango") is a small plucked chordophone (stringed instrument) from Peru, related to the guitars and lutes. Specifically, it is a form of charango, which has either seven or (usually) eight strings arranged in seven courses.

== History and design ==
The hatun charango is a relatively modern instrument, conceived by virtuoso charanguista Federico Tarazona, and first constructed to his design by luthier Fernando Luna of Lima, in mid 2001. The instrument was developed as a means of extending the range and versatility of the charango to embrace a more universal repertoire, including classical guitar and lute music.

Whereas the charango has a bowl-shaped back and is more closely related to the lute, the hatun charango has the flat back of the chillador, making it a closer relative of the guitar. Typically, the instrument is about 27 inches (690 mm) long, by 7 1/4 inches (180 mm) wide, by 3 1/2 inches (89 mm) deep. As with most members of the charango family, the neck is very wide and the headstock very long, compared to the relatively small body.

The common charango has ten strings arranged in five courses. The hatun charango basically adds one or (usually) two bass courses to this arrangement, while eliminating doublings on all but the third course. The resulting seven course instrument is tuned: (A3) • D4 • G4 • C5 • E5 E4 • A4 • E5. This arrangement preserves the reentrant tuning of the charango for courses one through five, while adding the D4 and A3 bass strings for courses six and seven, respectively. One unique feature of this instrument is that the added bass courses are fretted independently of the upper five courses, resulting in a somewhat "jagged" appearance to the fingerboard. This is done to achieve correct intonation on the bass strings of this very short, otherwise treble-pitched instrument. On the original design, the scale for the upper five courses is approximately 370 mm, while for the two bass courses the scale is about 380 mm.

The sound is similar to that of the charango and chillador, but the range is that of the ronroco and charango combined.

== Popularity ==
Since its invention in 2001, and largely as a result of the many compositions for, and performances on the hatun charango by Tarazona, the instrument has become popular, and several luthiers (including Tarazona himself) currently produce examples. Aquila sells a prepackaged string set for both 7- and 8-string models.
