= Cackalack =

Studio album by Jonathan Byrd
- Released: November 2010
- Recorded: November 23, 2009
- Genre: folk, Americana, bluegrass, singer-songwriter
- Label: Waterbug Records
- Producer: Jonathan Byrd

Jonathan Byrd chronology
The Law and the Lonesome (2008)	Cackalack (2010)

Cackalack is a 2010 studio album by Americana singer-songwriter Jonathan Byrd. The title is a variation of the word "Cackalacky", a popular (though at times derogatory) nickname for the Carolinas and the songs all connect to the culture and music of Byrd's home state of North Carolina. The album was recorded in a single day with a group of musicians, including members of Creaking Tree String Quartet.

== Reception ==
Professional ratings
Review scores
Source	Rating
Folk Alley	(favorable)
Public Radio East	(favorable)
The Folk Show	(favorable)
Scattered Black and Whites	(favorable)

The recording was well received by DJs playing folk and Americana music formats. It reached No. 22 on the Americana Music Association radio chart during the week of February 7, 2011. The album was also ranked No. 3 for the month of January 2011 on the Folk DJ-L radio chart. The most played tracks included "Cackalack!" and "I Was An Oak Tree". The album also reached No. 1 on the Roots Music Report "Top 50 Folk" chart.

In a review, Folk Alley's Jim Blum described the album as "much more rootsy than his previous releases, and sometimes quite bluegrassy.

== Track listing ==
All songs written by Jonathan Byrd unless indicated otherwise

1. "Chicken Wire" (Jonathan Byrd & Tom Gould) – 3:39
2. "Wild Ponies" – 4:41
3. "I Was an Oak Tree" – 2:44
4. "Reckon I Did" – 3:48
5. "New Moon Rise" – 3:53
6. "Dungarees Overalls" – 2:10
7. "Father's Day" – 4:01
8. "White Oak Wood" – 3:24
9. "Scuppernong" – 3:11
10. "Cackalack!" (Jonathan Byrd & Leonard Podolak) – 2:18

"Livers & Gizzards" (Hidden tracks/outtakes available as WAV files on the CD release)

1. "38 Baby" – 2:49
2. "Amelia My Dream" – 5:15
3. "Arkansas Traveler's Check" (traditional) – 3:01
4. "Blackberry Blossom" (traditional) – 2:21
5. "Dream Life" – 3:20
6. "Maureen" – 3:01

== Credits ==
Musicians:

- Jonathan Byrd – guitar & vocals
- John Showman – fiddle & vocals
- Brian Kobayakawa – bass & vocals
- Andrew Collins – mandolin & vocals
- Chris Quinn – banjo & vocals
- Treasa Levasseur – piano, accordion & vocals
- Ken Whitely – National Steel & vocals

Production:

- Produced – Jonathan Byrd
- Executive producers – Ed & Jand Grant, Jim & Brenda Prescott
- Recorded – Ken Whitely & Nik Tjelios at Casa Wroxton, Toronto, Ontario, November 23, 2009
- Mixed – Jonathan Byrd & Jerry Brown at The Bonus Room, Hillsborough, North Carolina, & The Rubber Room, Chapel Hill, North Carolina
- Baby photo – Darling Art, (darling-art.com)
- Design – John Dixon (haledixon.com)
