= This Is the New That =

Studio album by Jonathan Byrd
- Released: March 21, 2007
- Recorded: 2006
- Genre: folk, folk-rock singer-songwriter
- Label: Waterbug Records

Jonathan Byrd chronology
The Sea and the Sky (2004)	This Is the New That (2007)	Radio Soul (2007)

Professional ratings
Review scores
Source	Rating
Dirty Linen	favorable
FolkWax	9/10
NetRhythms	favorable
Rambles	unfavorable
Valley Advocate	favorable

This Is the New That is the fourth album by American singer-songwriter Jonathan Byrd. It was officially released on March 21, 2007, although it's online availability began in late December 2006. While Byrd's earlier recordings have been in more of a traditional folk vein ranging at times from bluegrass to world music, this release places Byrd's song craft in somewhat more of a rock setting. According to Byrd, some of his diverse influences here include Bob Dylan, Anaïs Mitchell, The Beatles & Merle Haggard.

Byrd is joined by a number of musicians. Collaborators from his previous disc, Rob McMaken and Andrew Reissiger of the Athens, Georgia-based world music duo, Dromedary join him again on this recording, however, this time they bring in amped up electric guitars rather than their usual assortment of exotic instruments.

Mastering of the CD was completed in early October 2006, and tracks from the disc began receiving its first U.S. airplay later that month. Also, the track, "The Cocaine Kid" received airplay in Europe as early as January 2007.

== Track listing ==
1. "The Cocaine Kid"
2. "Colleen"
3. "Jesus was a Bootlegger"
4. "Hank"
5. "Sexy Jessie"
6. "Austin Women"
7. "The Cold & Hungry Night"
8. "Learn to Rock 'n' Roll"
9. "Amelia, My Dream"
10. "I Want You"
11. "The Bishop & The Ghost of the Nazarene"
12. "Jacks"

== Credits ==
Musicians:

- Jonathan Byrd – guitar & vocals
- Rob McMaken – electric guitar & vocals
- Andrew Reissiger – electric guitar
- Jeff Reilly – drums
- Neal Fountain – bass & lap steel
- Will McFarlane – electric guitar
- Mary Moss – vocals

Production:

- Mastering – Bob Klotz Audio Productions, Port Matilda, Pennsylvania
