= Waitress (disambiguation) =

A waitress is a female server of food or drink.

Waitress may also refer to:

- Waitress (2007 film), 2007 comedy-drama
- Waitress (musical), 2015 stage musical based on the 2007 film
- Waitress: The Musical, 2023 live film recording of the musical
- Waitress!, 1981 comedy film
- The Waitress, 2002 album by Jonathan Byrd
- The Waitresses, new wave band
- The Waitresses (artists), performance art collective
- "Waitress", a song by Live from the album Throwing Copper
- The Waitress (It's Always Sunny in Philadelphia), fictional character
