= Jonathan Byrd =

Jonathan Byrd may refer to:

- Jonathan Byrd (musician) (born 1970), American singer-songwriter
- Jonathan Byrd (golfer) (born 1978), American golfer
