= Local United Network to Combat Hunger =

Artist-powered hunger relief organization

Local United Network to Combat Hunger (LUNCH) is an artist-powered hunger relief organization with national reach, based in Connecticut. It was founded in 1989 by Connecticut State Troubadour Bill Pere. One of the organization's primary programs is the LUNCH Ensemble, using the power of popular music to produce positive social action. The Ensemble is a music and drama troupe composed of several professional artists from the Connecticut Songwriters Association, along with approximately 30 students in grades four and up. LUNCH follows the example set by singer-songwriter-humanitarian Harry Chapin in the 1970s, showing how one person, through music, can make a difference in the lives of others. In December 2005, the organization received a recognition award from World Hunger Year (WHY) as "an effective grassroots solution to fighting hunger and poverty"
