= Reentrant tuning =

Break in an otherwise ascending or descending order of string pitches

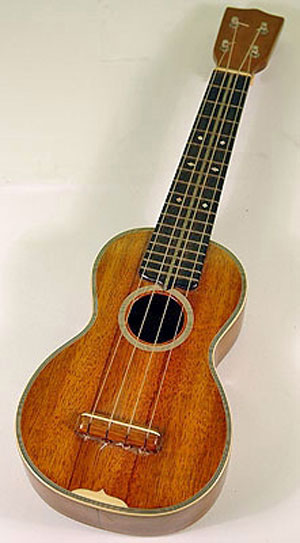
Soprano ukulele, an instrument which is almost always tuned in re-entrant fashion

Reentrant tuning is a tuning of a stringed instrument in which the strings (or the courses) are not arranged in a continuous order from lowest pitch to highest pitch or from highest to lowest. Instead, at least one string is tuned to a pitch that breaks the otherwise ascending or descending sequence; this discontinuity is known as a re-entry.

Most re-entrant tunings contain only one re-entry. For example, in the ukulele the re-entry occurs between the third and fourth strings, whereas in the Venezuelan cuatro it occurs between the first and second strings.

== Instruments ==
Instruments usually tuned in this way include:

- Baroque (5-course) guitar
- Five-string banjo
- Charango
- Cittern
- Venezuelan Cuatro
- Laouto
- Lirone
- Mexican Guitarrón
- Mexican vihuela
- Rajão
- Sitar
- Theorbo
- Tonkori
- Soprano and concert ukuleles
- Tres Cubano/Cuban Tres

Instruments often (but not always) re-entrantly tuned include:

- Tenor guitar
- Ten string classical guitar
- Tenor and Baritone (occasionally) ukuleles
- 10-bass Gibson Style U Harp guitar

Instruments not usually considered re-entrant, but which have common re-entrant alternate tunings:

- Guitar (Nashville tuning and Joe Beck's alto guitar tuning)
- Pedal steel guitar (C6 tuning and E9 tuning)

The standard tunings for instruments with multi-string courses, such as the twelve-string guitar, eight-string bass, or Colombian tiple are not considered re-entrant, as the principal strings of each course are ordered from lowest to highest.

=== Ukulele ===
Ukuleles other than the tenor and baritone are most commonly tuned in re-entrant fashion; the tenor often is as well, and occasionally the baritone. These conventional re-entrant tunings G_{4}–C_{4}–E_{4}–A_{4} are sometimes known as high 4th tunings or high G tuning.

Non-re-entrant tunings, also known as low 4th tunings, exist for these instruments.

=== Charango ===
Charango tuning

The Andean charango, a small 5-course, 10-string guitar frequently made from an armadillo shell, is most usually tuned in re-entrant fashion, with re-entry before and after the octave strung third course.

Other members of the charango family, such as the hualaycho and charangon are usually similarly tuned; the ronroco is often, but not always tuned re-entrantly.

=== Ten-string guitar ===
Narciso Yepes' re-entrant tuning for the ten string guitar

The ten string classical guitar was originally designed for a specific re-entrant tuning invented by Narciso Yepes, now called the Modern tuning also. Both this and other re-entrant tunings, such as the Marlow tunings, are now used, as well as non re-entrant tunings such as the Baroque; nevertheless the advantage of the Yepes re-entrant tuning over the other tunings is that it provides sympathetic resonance over all the 12 notes of the scale while the rest do not. These tunings may also be used on related instruments, such as ten string electric and jazz guitars.

=== Cuatro ===
Traditional re-entrant cuatro tuning

The Venezuelan cuatro is a member of the guitar family, smaller in size and with four nylon strings. It is similar in size and construction to the ukulele. The traditional "Camburpinton" tuning is re-entrant (A_{3}–D_{4}–F^{♯}_{4}–B_{3}), but with the re-entry between the second and first strings, rather than between third and fourth as in the ukulele. The results are very different in tone.

Other tunings of the Venezuelan cuatro are not re-entrant, however they are not as popular as the "Camburpinton" tuning.

The Venezuelan instrument is one of several Latin American instruments by the name of cuatro, which is Spanish for four. Despite the name, not all instruments called 'cuatro' have four strings. The ten-string, five-course Puerto Rican cuatro is not tuned re-entrantly, but in straight fourths. The cuatro Cubano also is not tuned re-entrantly.

=== Tenor guitar ===
Tenor guitar re-entrant tuning

A variety of tunings are used for the four string tenor guitar, including a relatively small number of re-entrant tunings. One example of a re-entrant tuning for tenor guitar is D_{4}–G_{3}–B_{3}–E_{4} with strings 3–1 as for the normal 6-string guitar, but string 4 tuned to D an octave above the 4th string of the 6 string guitar.

=== Banjo ===
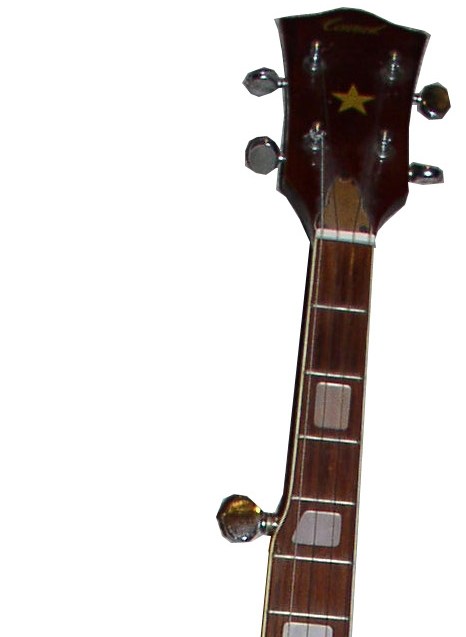
Upper neck and head of a bluegrass banjo, showing the shorter 5th string

The fifth string on the five string banjo, called the thumb string, also called the "drone string", is five frets shorter than the other four and is normally tuned higher than any of the other four, giving a re-entrant tuning such as the bluegrass G_{4}-D_{3}-G_{3}-B_{3}-D_{4}. The five string banjo is particularly used in bluegrass music and old-time music.

The four string plectrum banjo (more often used in jazz) and the four string tenor banjo (common in Irish traditional music) lack this shorter string, and are rarely tuned in re-entrant fashion.
