= The Sea and the Sky =

Studio album by Jonathan Byrd and Dromedary
- Released: June 15, 2004
- Recorded: June 30, 2003 – January 30, 2004
- Genre: folk, world music singer-songwriter
- Label: Waterbug Records
- Producer: Jonathan Byrd; Jerry Brown

Jonathan Byrd chronology
The Waitress (2002)	The Sea and the Sky (2004)	This Is the New That (2007)

Dromedary chronology
Live from the Make Believe (2003)	The Sea and the Sky (2004)	Dromedary Quartet (2006)

Professional ratings
Review scores
Source	Rating
Washington Post	favorable link

The Sea and the Sky is a 2004 collaborative album by North Carolina–based singer-songwriter Jonathan Byrd and Georgia-based world music duo, Dromedary (Andrew Reissiger and Rob McMaken).

== Track listing ==
All songs written by Jonathan Byrd

1. "True Companion" (5:38)
2. "The Yound Slaver" (3:51)
3. "I've Been Stolen" (2:58)
4. "Gold Coast" (4:23)
5. "I'm So Lost" (3:26)
6. "Verdigris (Intro)" (0:52)
7. "Verdigris" (3:50)
8. "Little Bird" (3:19)
9. "The New World" (3:43)
10. "The River Girl" (3:23)
11. "The Sea and the Sky" (5:12)
12. "For You" (5:00)

== Credits ==
=== Musicians ===
- Jonathan Byrd – vocals, Steel-string acoustic guitar, Flamenco guitar and vocals
- Rob McMaken – Appalachian dulcimer, mandolin, cümbüs, and vocals
- Andrew Reissiger – Charango, electric guitar, flamenco guitar
- Jason Cade – Fiddle, flute, and background Vocals
- Chris Frank – Accordion
- Robbie Link – Bass, cello
- Rex McGee – Fiddle

=== Production ===
- Jerry Brown – Producer, engineer
- Charlie Pilzer – Mastering

=== Artwork ===
- Jan Burger
