= Ken Silverman (musician) =

- Ken Silverman performing in NY, NY 2023

Background information
- Origin: New York, NY
- Genres: Jazz, Rock, Blues, Surf
- Occupation(s): Guitarist, Composer
- Instrument: Guitar
- Labels: SoundSeer

Ken Silverman is an American guitarist and composer based in New York City in the United States. Silverman has been described as incorporating in his compositions and guitar style elements of jazz, rock, blues, surf and classical. Additionally, he has on occasion experimented with other instruments such as oud, charango, and guitar synthesizer.

== Discography and video releases ==
Ken Silverman has released 5 recordings at present, which vary in styles, including free Improvisation (Macroscopia, 2010 - co-produced with Bassonist Claire deBrunner), to a septet featuring trumpeter Roy Campbell, Jr. and Japanese chanting and Shanshin by Kossan (From Emptiness, 2011), to a Solo Guitar recording which also had Oud and Charango (Visionaries, 2012). In recent years, Silverman has concentrated on the Ken Silverman Trio, which focuses on playing his original compositions and includes, in addition to Silverman on guitar, Sam McPherson on double bass and Any O'Neill on drums. The trio has released two albums, Parallel Man (2015), and Guitar Fantasies (2016).

Discography
Year	Project	Title	Label	Musicians
2010	Macroscopia	Macroscopia	Metier	Claire deBrunner - Basson; Ken Silverman - Guitar, Oud, Hand Percussion; Daniel Carter, Reeds, Trumpet; Tom Zlabinger, Bass
2011	Ken Silverman Septet	From Emptiness	SoundSeer	Ken Silverman - Electric and Acoustic Guitars, Oud, Hand Percussion; Roy Campbell Jr. - Trumpet, Pocket Trumpet, Flugelhorn, Flute; Kossan - Chanting and Shanshin; Blaise Siwula - Alto Saxophone and Clarinet; Tom Shad - Turkish Cumbus; Dave Miller - Drums
2012	Solo	Visionaries	SoundSeer	Ken Silverman - Electric and Acoustic Guitars, Oud, Charango
2015	Ken Silverman Trio	Parallel Man	SoundSeer	Ken Silverman - Guitar; Sam McPherson - Bass; Andy O'Neill - Drums
2016	Ken Silverman Trio	Guitar Fantasies	SoundSeer	Ken Silverman - Guitar; Sam McPherson - Bass; Andy O'Neill - Drums

Video Releases
Year	Title	Composer/Performer	Collaborator	Availability
2023	Theme for the Queen	Ken Silverman, Composer and Guitar/Guitar Synthesizer	Kenn Meiselman - Video Editing	You Tube

== Reception ==
Macroscopia: The Free Jazz Collective wrote, in its review, "The sound of the bassoon is most determining of the overall sound, yet it must be said that Silverman's unconventional guitar-playing and Zlabinger's hypnotic bass playing are really good.

Visionaries: Grego Edwards wrote in his review that " There are nine segments, each dedicated to a Guitarist, artist, or music-cultural force that has had impact on Ken Silverman's artistry in some way...And in the end we get something valuable, original yet eclectically so, very unexpected at times and very confirming-affirming at others. Hyrar Attarian wrote about Visionaries, "Silverman penned these abstract, tonal portraits first, and then named them after iconic individuals. The result is the ultimate homage to eleven trailblazers.

From Emptiness: Reviewer Hyrar Attarian wrote, "Ken Silverman's From Emptiness is an overtly theatrical and spiritual work...With this challenging yet immensely rewarding disc, Silverman and his septet of accomplished musicians have created a work of unique mysticism, drawing upon multiple different cultures for a near-masterpiece of improvised music.

Parallel Man: Writer Graham E. Peterson stated " A Modern Guitar Trio led by New York City Guitarist Ken Silverman comes out of the gate burning with rythmic intensity on the title track "Parallel Man...Mr. Silverman is engaging in artistic development and appears to be responding musically to the modern world in a manner that is fresh and unique to his own experience.

Guitar Fantasies: Writer Hyrar Attarian commented that " As with its predecessor, "Parallel Man", Guitar Fantasies showcases Silverman's originality as a composer and his superb skills into melding divergent traditions into a cohesive whole. The album is both accessible and inventive and should have wide appeal. The source of this is a uniqueness that derives from an even tension between the familiar and the freshly imaginative.
