= Manguerito =

Stringed instrument

String instrument
- Classification: String instrument
- Hornbostel–Sachs classification: (Composite chordophone)
- Developed: Bolivia

Related instruments
- Charango, khonkhota

The manguerito (or charanguito manguero) is a stringed instrument, a variant of the Andean charango, invented by Ernesto Cavour from La Paz, Bolivia. The instrument was intended to be small enough to be carried and hidden in one's sleeves (Spanish: manga), thus the term. It has 7 nylon strings in 5 courses and is tuned D4, G4, B4 B3, E4, B4 B4.
