= Annie Gallup =

American singer-songwriter

Annie Gallup is an American singer-songwriter.

The daughter of a woodworking father and a screenprinting mother, Gallup studied modern dance and ballet as she grew up in Ann Arbor, Michigan. She graduated with an art degree from the University of Michigan School of Art before moving to Kentucky, Washington state, North Carolina and Massachusetts. She lives currently in Santa Barbara, California.

Before her initial public performance in 1988, Gallup worked as a cook on a yacht, a designer of wedding rings, and a massage therapist.

Gallup has ten CDs of original songs as a solo artist, and seven with Peter Gallway as the duo Hat Check Girl. She was awarded an ArtServe Michigan/Michigan Council of the Arts and Cultural Affairs project grant in 2001 to create and perform her theater piece Stay Me With Flagons"The CD Pearl Street, a collection of linked-narrative songs, was adapted from another theater piece, originally called Skinny Arms. She is a Kerville New Folk winner (2002) and Napa Valley Music Festival winner (1999).

Her song "Circle" was covered by Chuck Brodsky on his album Radio. She covered Rachel Bissex's song "Angel" on the tribute-record Remembering Rachel: Songs Of Rachel Bissex (2005).

Gallup and Gallway were married on March 1, 2014.

== Discography ==
Solo

- Cause and Effect (1994)
- Backbone (1996)
- Courage My Love (1998)
- Steady Steady Yes (1999)
- Swerve (2001)
- Pearl Street (2005)
- Selected Songs 1994–2004 (2005) (promo-CD)
- Angel on Remembering Rachel: Songs Of Rachel Bissex (2005)
- Half Of My Crime (2006)
- Ortho Songs (2006) (EP)
- Weather (2010)
- Little Five Points (2012)
- Ghost (2015)
- Lucy Remembers Her Father (2017)

with Hat Check Girl

- Tenderness (2010)
- Six Bucks Shy (2011)
- Road To Red Point (2012)
- Goodbye Butterfield (fall 2013)
- At 2 In The Morning (2015)
- Two Sides to Every Story (2016)
- Cold Smoke (2018)
