= Jenn Lindsay =

American singer-songwriter (born 1978)

- Born: October 18, 1978 (age 47); Amarillo, Texas, U.S.
- Education: Stanford University (BA); Yale University; Columbia University (M.Div.); Sapienza University (MA); Boston University (Ph.D.)
- Alma mater: Liverpool Institute for Performing Arts
- Occupations: professor of Sociology and Communications, documentary filmmaker, video journalist, singer-songwriter.
- Organization: So Fare Films
- Website: Official website

Jenn Lindsay (born October 18, 1978) is an American sociologist, documentary filmmaker, and singer-songwriter based in Rome, Italy. Her work explores themes of interfaith dialogue, social diversity, and grassroots activism, and includes the documentary Quarantined Faith and the ethnographic film Jilbab.

== Biography ==
Lindsay has held academic positions and conducted research in the United States and Europe. In 2014, she moved to Rome to conduct doctoral research on interfaith dialogue. Her academic work examines the dynamics of religious communities and the challenges of pluralism in contemporary society.

At the age of 13, Lindsay became interested in her Jewish heritage and committed to progressive Judaism, formally converting at age 17. Her Jewish involvement began at the Stanford University Hillel. In the summer of 2001, she worked as the program director at Lights in Action. From 2007 to 2008, she was a development associate at Congregation Beit Simchat Torah. In the summer of 2008, she was the music director at a B'nai B'rith Youth Organization summer camp near Milwaukee. From 2011 to 2013, she was the teacher for the Bar/Bat Mitzvah year of the Boston Workmen's Circle Sunday School. In Rome, she wrote about her involvement in the emergent progressive Jewish community Beth Hillel.

== Filmmaking career ==
Between 2005 and 2008, Lindsay worked in the film and music industries as a documentary filmmaker, film editor, and composer at MTV, the Sundance Channel, and several independent post-production facilities. She served as an assistant story editor on the MTV reality show 8th & Ocean and Atmosphere Picture's Trek Nation, a biographical documentary about Star Trek creator Gene Roddenberry. She worked as an assistant editor with Zak Tucker on The Garden (Harbor Picture), previously known as Body & Soul, by Swede Films. Furthermore, she founded and directed Get Thee to Nunnery Productions, an independent film company active from 2005 to 2017. In 2016, she co-founded So Fare Films in Rome, where she currently serves as director.

In 2011, she wrote, produced, and directed Jilbab, a 36-minute documentary on veiling trends for Muslim women in Jogjakarta, Indonesia. It has been screened in Boston University classrooms, as well as in the Muslim Women and the Challenge of Authority Lecture Series (2011), the American Academy of Religion Mid-Atlantic Regional Meeting (2012), the American Academy of Religion Annual Meeting Film Series (Chicago 2012), and the International Society for the Sociology of Religion Film Series (2013).

In July 2012, she led a film team to produce a short film about the International Political Camp at Agape Centro Ecumenico, which included interviews on topics related to environmental and grassroots activism.

Between 2013 and 2018, Lindsay was the staff documentarian for the Center for Mind and Culture and the Institute for the Bio-Cultural Study of Religion, producing short films for CMAC and IBCSR about the center's projects, thematically centered around the scientific study of religion, the nexus of brain, mind, and culture, and interdisciplinary scholarship.

During that period, she completed From Alef to Zayin: A Secular Jewish Education (2013), a 21-minute documentary about bar mitzvah students in a secular humanist Jewish community. The film is intended to stimulate thinking about the role of Jewish identity, the idea of non-religious Judaism, and how the students understand and negotiate their own identities. It screened in San Diego, California at the Society for Psychological Anthropology/Anthropology of Children and Youth Interest Group Annual Meeting in January 2013, and at the International Society for the Sociology of Religion in Louvain-la-Neuve, Belgium, in July 2015.

In 2015, she completed IBCSR: The Institute for the Bio-Cultural Study of Religion (2015), a 52-minute documentary about the Institute for the Bio-Cultural Study of Religion in Boston. Lindsay uses documentary film techniques to explore and explain the institute's research projects, and the dialogues between religion and science.

Then, she worked on Il Presepe di Calcata (2016), a 21-minute ethnographic documentary film about the Italian village of Calcata and its residents, and follows the handmade Nativity scene (presepe in Italian) of the Dutch sculptor Marijcke van der Maden, a resident of Calcata since 1984.

In 2020, Lindsay produced the award-winning documentary film Quarantined Faith about the suspension of religious gatherings in Rome due to the COVID-19 national lockdown in Italy during Passover, Easter, and Ramadan.

Also in 2020, Lindsay produced a short collection of video journalism called Quarantena alla Romana, which was selected for screening by the COVIDaVINCI Film Festival and the X World Short Film Festival.

As of 2022, Lindsay is in production with The Modeling Religion Project, Minding Shadows and ShalOM, and in post-production with the documentary Simulating Religious Violence. The Modeling Religion Project is an 8-episode docuseries about how scholars understand religion, how computer models help us understand the world we live in, and the art of working together across disciplines. Minding Shadows tells the story of a Buddhist monk from Africa who survived the Rwandan genocide in 1994 and grew up to teach mindfulness and healing practices globally. ShalOM is a documentary partially funded by KAICIID Dialogue Centre that recounts the story of dialogues between world leaders of Judaism and Hinduism, between 2007 and 2009. Simulating Religious Violence is about how computer simulation can reveal solutions to worldwide humanitarian crises, following an international crew of computer scientists and religious scholars that develop a technology to prevent terrorist attacks.

Lindsay has written about her use of documentary film as an anthropological method and how she uses her films as classroom teaching tools.

== Awards won by Quarantined Faith ==
- Special Jury Award for the theme of "Migrations and Coexistence": 23rd Edition of the Religion Today Film Festival
- Best Documentary, Best Message, Best Foreign Film: Christian Online Film Festival
- Best Documentary: Picasso Einstein Buddha International Film Festival
- Honorable Mention for Best Short Documentary: Florence Film Awards
- Honorable Mention for Best Documentary: Madras International Film Festival
- Finalist for Best Documentary: Luleå International Film Festival
- Semi-Finalist for Best Documentary: International Moving Film Festival
- Semi-Finalist for Best Documentary: Eurasia Fest
- Award of Recognition: Impact DOCS

== Social scientific research ==
Lindsay completed her PhD in Religion and Society at Boston University in 2018, advised by sociologist Nancy Ammerman. She studied Interfaith Relations and Ecumenics (M.Div '11) at Union Theological Seminary at Columbia University in New York City, where she was co-chair of the Interfaith Caucus and the Chair of Student Activities (2009 and 2010, respectively). Her research concerns religious and social diversity and interreligious dialogue. Her website reports that Lindsay "uses her research and films to encourage reflection about religion 'outside the box,' fostering interreligious collaboration and healthier human exchanges, and educating individuals and religious leaders about the realities and demands of 'street-level pluralism' in increasingly diverse communities."

Lindsay began her career as an investigative fieldworker in 1998 in the Peruvian highlands, focusing specifically on Andean women's rural lives and their use of religious symbols and rituals. This fieldwork explored the field of ethnoastronomy with indigenous communities in Northern Peru, charting how locals combine Pachamama spirit imagery with imported Catholic images to interpret celestial phenomena such as constellations, eclipses, and weather patterns. In 2010 she lived for four months in Jogjakarta, Indonesia, and conducted ethnographic research on Catholic/Muslim couples in Central Java. In Summer 2012 she was sponsored by the American Society for Psychological Anthropology to study intermarriage among Roman Jews.

In spring 2013, she was the Boston University Film Society's Featured Lecturer for the "Religion and Film Series."

Between 2010 and 2014, Jenn Lindsay was a member of the planning committee for the International Political Camp at Agape Centro Ecumenico, an ecumenical center in Northern Italy with roots in the post-WWII peace movement. In July 2012 she was a guest lecturer to the International Theological Camp, delivering a lecture entitled "Howard Thurman, Mysticism, and Social Action".

For her PhD dissertation fieldwork, revolving around interfaith dialogue activity in the city of Rome, in 2014 and 2015, Lindsay was based at the Roman intercultural magazine Confronti, traveling for press tours in partnership with Holy Land Trust throughout Palestine and Israel.

== Writing ==
=== Journalism and academic writing ===
Since 2011, Lindsay has been a contributing scholar of State of Formation, the online platform of the Journal of Inter-religious Studies. Lindsay's articles for State of Formation explore religious, theological, social, and psychological themes. In July 2012, she was named Writer of the Month for an article she published about multiple religious belonging. Her piece on the election of Pope Francis was the site's Featured Article of March 2013.

In 2015, she wrote for the magazine Confronti, and that same year started publishing peer-reviewed journal articles on topics spanning interreligious dialogue, intercultural competence, and documentary filmmaking.

=== Playwriting ===
In 2001, Lindsay received a degree in playwriting from Stanford University. Her plays feature female characters exploring themes of history, memory, fear, and sexuality.

Her play The Grandmother Project was supported in development by a Stanford Humanities Major Grant in Playwriting and the Stanford University Jewish Studies Program, as well as private Jewish family donors from the Bay Area. The play was produced in February 2001 by Highlighter's Theatre Troupe at Stanford University, in April 2001 at the British National Student Drama Festival in Scarborough UK, and in August 2001 as a staged reading by A Traveling Jewish Theatre in San Francisco, California.

Her play The History of a Liar was produced in January 2001 by Ram's Head Theatrical Society at Stanford University and featured fellow Stanford University alumni Danny Jacobs and Kathryn Sigismund.

Her play Body of Work was produced as a staged reading in March 2001 by the Stanford University Feminist Studies Program.

Her play The Gala was produced in May 2000 at the Liverpool Institute for the Performing Arts in Liverpool UK.

In 2001, she received Commendations for Playwriting and Acting from the British National Student Drama Festival, and a recognition for Meritorious Contribution to Playwriting by the American College Theatre Festival. In 2000 she received a Commendation for Excellent Drama Criticism from the British National Student Drama Festival.

== Music career ==
Lindsay released her tenth studio album Allora Eccola in 2014. Nine of her ten albums were released independently on her own record label No Evil Star Records, but her fifth record was released through Waterbug Records, an artists' cooperative record label based in Chicago run by Andrew Calhoun. She has shared the stage with Regina Spektor, Jeffrey Lewis, Kimya Dawson, Alix Olson, Chris Barron, Erin McKeown, Lach, Girlyman, and Toshi Reagon, primarily through her association with the anti-folk music scene based in the East Village of New York City. Her website says that Lindsay plays music "for the jobless, the brave, and the indignant." Her music is featured on compilation albums by the ACLU, SBS Records, Waterbug Records, and Stanford University. Her song "White Room" was used as the theme song to "Something Blue," a television pilot by Brooklyn filmmaker Emily Millay Haddad. Lindsay recorded all but her first and tenth albums with Major Matt Mason USA of the New York anti-folk scene and works frequently with Bryant Moore (Sneaky Thieves, Bryant Moore and the Celestial Shore) on drum and bass arrangements.

During high school, Lindsay sang in the Red Robe Choir and played in a folk band covering a range of artists. She started writing songs after attending the Lilith Fair in 1998 and resolved to join the ranks of the featured female singer-songwriters. Her songwriting attracted attention when she was a student at Stanford University, where she headlined Take Back the Night Marches and taught songwriting to victims of domestic abuse at the Peninsula YMCA in the Bay Area. Lindsay started gigging professionally at age 19 while in the acting program at the Liverpool Institute for Performing Arts. She moved to New York City in 2001 and was named the "best female singer-songwriter in NYC" by online radio station Radio Crystal Blue.

Lindsay's sixth through tenth studio albums were financed by her fans. Her 2006 album Uphill Both Ways explores themes of personal change, grief, and daily life. Lindsay wrote of the album that it is "A declaration of independence, a love letter, a primal scream, and a homecoming announcement. It's a pageant of change, growing up, grief, and the little things that get us out of bed in the morning."

Lindsay recorded several of her albums at Olive Juice Studios, a low-fi home studio. Tor reduce production costs, Lindsay learned and played many of the instruments herself, including guitar, piano, banjo, baritone ukulele, mandolin, drums, keyboard, xylophone, the Vietnamese dan mo, the marxophone, harmonica, and tambourine.

Lindsay's music has been positively reviewed by sources such as Smother.net and Rambles Magazine. Smother.net remarks, "Jenn Lindsay has her finger right on the pulse of the whole wide world of working people everywhere." Rambles Magazine said "If some of her songs were given the exposure that they deserve, New York would be one receptionist short but the folk world would be one star richer."

The impoverished struggle of being a solo artist in New York City sent Lindsay out onto the road, booking her own shows, leading college workshops, and forming travelling collectives with other emerging artists. In New York City, her musical community is the anti-folk scene, a hub of musicians based in the East Village's Sidewalk Cafe, who share a mutual distaste for well-packaged mainstream music. Her music, "delicate and tough...stark urban imagery" (San Diego Union-Tribune), showcases "a talent well-versed in the field of social protest music". (Stanford Daily)

Her music appears on a number of compilation albums. "Loving the Fair" is included in the Stanford University LGBTQ-CRC Center Compilation (September 2002). "Athena" is included in the SUNY Binghamton: Best Bands!, released by the SUNYB Activities Council (October 2002). "Red Shirt" is on Study Break: Best of Stanford Musicians, released by the Stanford Activities Council (April 2002). "Not a Sound (featuring Roland Marconi)" is on A Chance for Peace after 9/11, released by Educators for Social Justice (November 2002). "Close" is on the Waterbug Anthology 7, released out of Chicago by Waterbug Music as an introduction to the musicians affiliated with the label (July 2004). "Jill and Jill" is included in Marry Me, released by the American Civil Liberties Union (ACLU) to support GLBT couples seeking to marry (November 2004). "White Room" is on the SBS Records #9 Sampler, a compilation put out by musicians Michele Malone and Amy Ray of the Indigo Girls, released nationally in September 2005. "I Am Not Going Home Yet" and "The Well" are included in I, Even I, Will Sing, a compilation of student musicians from Union Theological Seminary (Spring 2011). In July 2006 Jenn Lindsay composed scores for two ten-minute industrial films for Price Waterhouse Coopers. In 2015 Confronti Magazine used her song "The Bird" from the album Allora Eccola in their short video about a demolished Palestinian home outside Bethlehem.

== Filmography ==
- The Garden (2005)
- 8th & Ocean (2006)
- Holy Wisdom Monastery (2010)
- Trek Nation (2011)
- Occupy Boston: Occupy Religion (2011)
- Jilbab: The Indonesian Headscarf (2011)
- Agape International (2012)
- From Alef to Zayin (2013)
- IBCSR: The Institute for the Bio-Cultural Study of Religion (2015)
- Il Presepe di Calcata (2016)
- Quarantined Faith: Rome, Religion and Coronavirus (2020)
- Quarantine alla Romana (2020)
- Women in Progress (2021-2024)
- Simulating Religious Violence (2024)
- Ikhaya (2025)
- Body Stories (2025)
- Religion Stories (2025)

=== In production or post-production ===
- Minding Shadows

== Publications ==
=== Peer-reviewed journal articles ===
- "Growing Interreligious and Intercultural Competence in the Classroom." Teaching Theology & Religion, vol. 23, no. 1, 5 Mar. 2020, pp. 17–33., doi:10.1111/teth.12527
- "Interfaith Dialogue and Humanization of the Religious Other: Discourse and Action." International Journal of Interreligious and Intercultural Studies 3 (2), 1–24. https://doi.org/10.32795/ijiis.vol3.iss2.2020.691
- "Creative Dialogue in Rome, Italy: Thinking Beyond Discourse-Based Interfaith Engagement." Dialogue Studies (forthcoming in Winter 2021). "The Interfaith Society: A Durkheimian Analysis of Interfaith Engagement."
- Journal of Interreligious Studies (forthcoming in Winter 2021).

=== Books ===
- The Law Is Made to Be Broken: Interfaith Marriage in Jogjakarta, Indonesia. LAP Lambert Academic Publishing. 2020.
- Pluralismo Vivo: Lived Religious Pluralism and Interfaith Dialogue in Rome. LIT Verlag, Munich. 2021.

==== Book chapters ====
- "Confronti: A Case Study of Institutions Fostering Religious Pluralism in Rome." Interfaith Networks and Development, Ed. Eztra Chitando. Palgrave MacMillian New York, forthcoming (2022).
- "Meaningful Interpersonal Contact: Interreligious Dialogue as a Religious Response to the Cognitive and Social Dynamics of Bias." Religious Perspectives on a Secular World. Ed. Uzma Ashraf and Simone Raudino. Palgrave, forthcoming (2021).
- "Modeling Models: Documentary Filmmaking as a Purposeful Abstraction of the Modeling Process." Human Simulation, Ed. Saikou Diallo and Wesley J. Wildman. Springer Press, 2019.
- "What Kind of Activist Are You? Identities and Motivations of Youth Activists." Towards a Global Christian Movement for Eco-Justice, Ed. Shantha Ready Alonso. Indian Society for Promoting Christian Knowledge (ISPCK), 2015.

== Discography ==
- Bring It On (2000)
- The Story of What Works (2001)
- Gotta Lotta (2002)
- Fired! (2003)
- The Last New York Horn (2004)
- Uphill Both Ways (2006)
- Perfect Handful (2006)
- A For Effort (2008)
- Prospect Hearts (2011)
- Allora Eccola (2014)

== See also ==
- Anti-folk
- Urban Folk
