= Radio Soul =

Studio album by Byrdjones
- Released: May 2007
- Recorded: January 2007, Nashville, Tennessee
- Genres: country, folk, singer-songwriter
- Length: 35:22
- Label: self-released
- Producer: Diana Jones

Jonathan Byrd chronology
This Is the New That (2007)	Radio Soul (2007)	The Law & the Lonesome (2008)

Diana Jones chronology
My Remembrance of You (2006)	Radio Soul (2007)

Professional ratings
Review scores
Source	Rating
FolkWax	(8/10)
FW Weekly	(favorable)

Radio Soul is a 2007 album by Byrdjones, a collaboration by contemporary folk singer-songwriters Jonathan Byrd and Diana Jones. The duo assembled the album in preparation for a series of tours in which they split the bill across parts of Europe and the United States.

== Recording ==
Although the liner notes do not include any musician credits, the sound of the album is essentially that of the voices of two distinct songwriters and their guitars (Byrd plays mandolin on a couple of tracks). It could have been done all at once with a single microphone (think of the stripped down sound of Time (The Revelator) but with higher tempo and slightly more conventional harmonies). Byrd's flatpicking solos are featured on a couple of tracks as well (notably on "Poor Boy" and "The Things of This World"). The song, "The Other Side" is delivered a cappella.

The entire album was recorded in seven hours with only a few days of rehearsal. The recording was engineered by Bruce Chandler at the Nashville Record Barn in Nashville, Tennessee.

== Songs ==
The album kicks off with the title track—the album's only legitimate co-write. The rest of the album more-or-less alternates between compositions that Byrd and Jones individually contributed with a Carter Family cover near the end.

A few of the songs have appeared elsewhere in the individual artists' catalogs. Jones sings the title track of her 2006 breakthrough, My Remembrance of You with Byrd adding a natural harmony that was absent in the original. Some of her other songs here, "Maryville" (presumably Maryville, Tennessee) and "Orphan's Home" might also have fit well on her solo album—they have the same longing for the ancestors and home that she never knew while growing up (Jones was adopted as an infant).

Byrd also revisits some earlier material; "Vemla" was first recorded for his 2000 debut, Wildflowers. The song gives his account of serial killer Velma Barfield whose victims included Byrd's own grandfather. An earlier electric version of "Poor Boy" was recorded for, but didn't make the final cut on Byrd's This Is the New That (it is one of three outtakes hidden in a data track of the CD release).

Both artists dig deeply into their Appalachian roots and pull out a lot of gospel imagery in their songwriting. Darkness and sorrow are balance by optimism. Near the end of the final track, Jones' "That Better Day", Byrd and Jones take the song on a brief detour into the 1920s pop classic, "Ain't We Got Fun?" before returning to its main theme and bringing the album to a close.

== Track listing ==
1. "Radio Soul" (Byrd, Jones) – 3:46
2. "Poor Boy" (Byrd) – 2:51
3. "Maryville" (Jones) – 2:24
4. "The Things of this World" (Byrd) – 3:26
5. "Reckon I Did" (Byrd) – 3:46
6. "My Remembrance of You" (Jones) – 3:42
7. "The Other Side" (Jones) – 1:52
8. "Orphan's Home" (Jones) – 3:14
9. "Velma" (Byrd) – 3:27
10. "Blue Eyes" (A.P. Carter) – 3:59
11. "That Better Day" (Jones) – 2:49

== Credits ==
- Producer – Diana Jones
- Assistant producer – Pamela Cole
- Recording engineer – Bruce Chandler
  - Recorded at the Nashville Record Barn, Nashville, Tennessee
- Mastering – Bob Klotz
  - Mastered at Klotz Audio, Port Matilda, Pennsylvania
- Design – Hale Dixon
