= Dromedary (band) =

American world music band

- Origin: Athens, Georgia, U.S.
- Genre: world music
- Instruments: Appalachian dulcimer, charango, cümbüs, guitar, mandolin, etc.
- Years active: circa 2001 - current
- Members: Andrew Reissiger; Rob McMaken; Jeff Reilly; Neal Fountain
- Website: dromedarymusic.com

Dromedary, also known as the Dromedary Quartet, is an American world music band originally based out of Athens, Georgia, but now with members on both coasts. The group formed as a duo consisting of Andrew Reissiger and Rob McMaken playing a variety of instruments from cultures across the globe. The group's most recent album Sticks and Stones features New Orleans-to-Athens transplant Louis Romanos (percussion) and Chris Enghauser (bass).

Instruments utilized include the Bolivian charango, the Turkish cumbus, the Appalachian dulcimer, mandolin, and guitar.

The duo have also been frequent collaborators with North Carolina–based singer-songwriter Jonathan Byrd. Together they recorded The Sea and The Sky, an album of songs Byrd wrote inspired by a band.

== Discography ==
- Artifact (2001)
- Live from the Make Believe (2003)
- Dromedary Quartet (2006)
- Sticks and Stones (2008)

=== with Jonathan Byrd ===
- The Sea and The Sky (2004, Waterbug)
- This Is The New That (2007, Waterbug)
