= Gates of Love =

Gates of Love may refer to:

- "Gates of Love", 1984 song by Andrew Calhoun
- "Gates of Love", 1990 song by Circus of Power from Vices
