= Raza Obrera =

- Origin: Aguililla, Michoacán, Mexico
- Genres: Regional Mexican
- Years active: 1996–present
- Label: Raza Obrera Music
- Members: José Luis Arroyo; José Luis Horta; Nelson Rivas; Barocio
- Past members: Rigoberto Peña; Simon Rivera (+); Roberto González; Hugo Pedraza
- Website: razaobrera.com

Raza Obrera (English: Working Class) is a Regional Mexican band known for their unique style of music and its prominent use of the harp, along with the accordion and charango. They are based out of Newark, California, United States, and are originally from Aguililla, Michoacán, Mexico. Their style is a combination of rough Pacific-style Norteño and Big Harp Conjunto from Michoacán. Another Regional Mexican band with a similar style is Los Canarios de Michoacán.

== History ==
The band was started in 1996 by members José Luis Arroyo (drums, vocals), José Luis Horta (accordion, Vocals), Roberto González (charango), Simón Rivera (harp) and Rigoberto Peña (bass, vocals). The band signed with Ego Records in 1996 and released their debut album El Águila González and became involved in the U.S. Regional Mexican scene. Raza Obrera is known for their corridos based on controversial issues relating to the Mexican working class.

== Members ==
- José Luis Arroyo – director, lead vocals, drums
- José Luis Horta – lead vocals, accordion
- Barocio - harp
- Iván Oso Rea – bass
- Misa Reyes – bajo quinto
- Pedro Venegas – keyboard

== Former members ==
- Rigoberto Peña – vocals, bass
- Simon Rivera – harp (died in 2025)
- Roberto Gonzalez – charango
- Hugo Pedraza – keyboards
- Nelson Rivas – bass

== Discography ==
- El Aguila Gonzalez (1996) (First album)
- El Cocinero (1997)
- Corridazos Prohibidos (1998)
- Corridazos Prohibidos Vol. 2 (1999)
- Colgó el Pico la Paloma (1999)
- Arpacumbiando: Caliente, Caliente (2001)
- El Dia de los Malandrines(2001)
- Arparrelampagueando (2002) (Last album on Ego Récords)
- Arpacumbiando, Vol. 2(2002) (First album on Fonovisa)
- Rolononas Pa'la Raza(2003)
- Ritmo, Amor y Pueblo (2004)
- El Campirano: Puros Corridos(2004)
- 14 Nuevas: Pa' Celebrar El 10° Aniversario con Nuestra Raza (2006) (First album with Three Sound Récords)
- Paniqueando y Parrandeando con una Mera (2007)
- Atado A Ti(2010)
- Caminos de Michoacan(2013)
- 10 Consentidas de la Raza (2016)
- Corridos al Estilo Michoacán (2018)

== Billboard chart history ==
- 72- Arpacumbiando Vol. 2, Raza Obrera, August 17, 2002
- 72- Linea de Oro: Caliente, Caliente y Muchos Exitos Mas..., Raza Obrera, June 16, 2007
