= My Remembrance of You =

Studio album by Diana Jones
- Released: April 11, 2006
- Genre: Country, folk
- Label: NewSong
- Producer: Mark Thayer and Diana Jones

Diana Jones chronology
Imagine Me (1998)	My Remembrance of You (2006)	Radio Soul (2007)

Professional ratings
Review scores
Source	Rating
Allmusic	4/5 stars

My Remembrance of You is the 2006 breakthrough album by Diana Jones.

== Track listing ==
All songs written by Diana Jones

1. "Pretty Girl" – 3:10
2. "My Beloved" – 3:29
3. "All My Money on You" – 3:09
4. "Pony" – 4:40
5. "A Hold on Me" – 4:20
6. "Up in Smoke" – 4:25
7. "Cold Grey Ground" – 2:21
8. "Fever Moon" – 3:12
9. "Lay Me Down" – 4:13
10. "Willow Tree" – 2:53
11. "My Remembrance of You" – 3:40
