= Diana Jones (singer-songwriter) =

American singer-songwriter

- Born: c. 1965 (age 60–61)
- Genres: country, folk singer-songwriter
- Instruments: vocals, guitar, fiddle, mandolin
- Years active: 1997–present
- Labels: NewSong, Proper
- Website: dianajonesmusic.com

Diana Jones is an American singer-songwriter based in Nashville, Tennessee. Jones's career gained wider critical acclaim in 2006 with the release of her album My Remembrance of You. The album made a number of critics end-of-the-year "best of" lists. The Chicago Tribune rated the album as the "best country recording of 2006" and described Jones as "an Americana gem", whose sound rides "an old-timey vibe that never sounds fussy ... in a voice subtly shaded by the high lonesome sound."

Jones has also won a number of songwriting competitions, including the venerable "New Folk" competition at the 2006 Kerrville Folk Festival. Her song "Pony" was nominated as "Song of the Year" by the North American Folk Alliance, and Jones herself was nominated as "Emerging Artist of the Year" for 2006.

== Biography ==
Diana Jones was adopted as an infant and raised in New York City. She was first drawn to country music in the early 1980s when she was attending high school on Long Island. While her peers were listening to Michael Jackson, Kenny Loggins and Prince she began to seek out recordings by Johnny Cash and Patsy Cline. She was also drawn to contemporary acts such as Dolly Parton and Emmylou Harris.

After graduating from college Jones was reunited with her birth family in eastern Tennessee. It was there that she also gained a sense of her musical heritage when she discovered her grandfather, Robert Lee Maranville, was a talented singer and had been in a Knoxville band with Chet Atkins. "I found my first Smithsonian Folkways recording of Southern ballads up at Cades Cove in the Smokies on a drive with him", Jones explained to the Columbus Dispatch. "I put it in the CD player, and he started singing along and tapping his finger on his leg. He knew all those songs...I felt like I had discovered the source of what I had been trying to find musically."

In the 1990s Jones continued to develop as a writer and performer in the music scene around Austin, Texas, She released two albums, signed a deal with Hamstein Publishing, and began to develop a grass roots following.

It was the death of Maranville in 2000 that caused her to move back to the north-eastern United States and enter a period of personal reflection: "I wrote this last project [My Remembrance of You] in a cabin in the woods, trying to recover my balance after the loss of my grandfather. I was writing songs because I had to, for myself."

== Career ==
Although widely recognized as an "emerging artist" in 2006, Jones's recording and songwriting career began a decade earlier. Her 1997 debut album, Imagine Me, has been described as a combination of "the traditional American folk genre with a cutting edge on modern female folk music". Two years later, Jones followed-up with The One That Got Away.

Jones really caught the attention of folk music fans when she re-emerged with My Remembrance of You. The album was released on March 12, 2006. It was dedicated to her late grandfather while also paying tribute to producer and archivist Alan Lomax.

The recording almost immediately received high praise from critics. The collection of eleven original songs have been described as "understated and beautifully crafted" and sounding as though they could have been written in 1935 rather than 2005. In addition to vocals, Jones is featured on guitar, mandolin and fiddle. Other musicians include Duke Levine on strings, Bob Dick on bass, Lorne Entress on percussion, and Jay Ungar on fiddle.

Perhaps the most noted track in the collection is "Pony", a song told from the viewpoint of a young Native American girl in the 1920s who is forced to assimilate to a life and culture that is not her own.

"Pony" features Ferron on backing vocals. In addition to being nominated for a "Song of the Year" award by the North American Folk Alliance, the song finished the year at number 15 in the 2006 year-end Folk Radio Airplay Chart.

In 2007, Jones produced an album of songs written and performed with North Carolina–based songwriter Jonathan Byrd. Radio Soul is a stripped-down recording featuring the voices and guitars of the two songwriters with little added instrumentation.

In September 2008, Joan Baez released a recording of Jones's "Henry Russell's Last Words" on her album Day After Tomorrow. Baez' album has since been nominated for a Grammy.

In 2009, Jones released "Better Times Will Come" on Proper Records which included "Henry Russell's Last Words", "Cracked and Broken," and "The Day I Die", Nanci Griffith sang back up on the title track.

High Atmosphere (Proper) was released in 2011.

Museum of Appalachia Recordings was recorded at Peters Homestead Cabin, Museum of Appalachia, in Clinton, Tennessee, in December 2012, and released in November 2013. Recorded live with two session musicians, the record was inspired by the love of old-time Appalachian music Jones's grandfather passed on to her.

Jones is frequently compared to other distinct voices in Americana music such as Gillian Welch, Iris DeMent, and Alison Krauss. Jones states that she is flattered by the comparisons and if asked to add a name to the list suggests "Ginny Hawker would be the name I would add. She has one of the truest voices I have heard. I love everything about the way she sings a song."

Jones has shared the stage with many artists, including Janis Ian, Steve Earle, Martina McBride, Nanci Griffith, Richard Thompson, John Gorka, Mary Gauthier, Old Crow Medicine Show, Guy Clark, and many others.

== Discography ==
- Imagine Me (1997, New Shoes Records)
- The One That Got Away (1998, New Shoes Records)
- My Remembrance of You (2006, NewSong Recordings)
- Radio Soul, with Jonathan Byrd (May 2007)
- Better Times Will Come (February 2009, Proper Records [UK]/ April 2009 [US])
- High Atmosphere (April 5, 2011, US)
- Museum Of Appalachia Recordings (July 8, 2013 Proper Records [UK]/ November 5, 2013 Goldmine Records USA)
- Song to a Refugee (September 25, 2020, Proper Records)
