= Chillador =

Andean stringed instrument

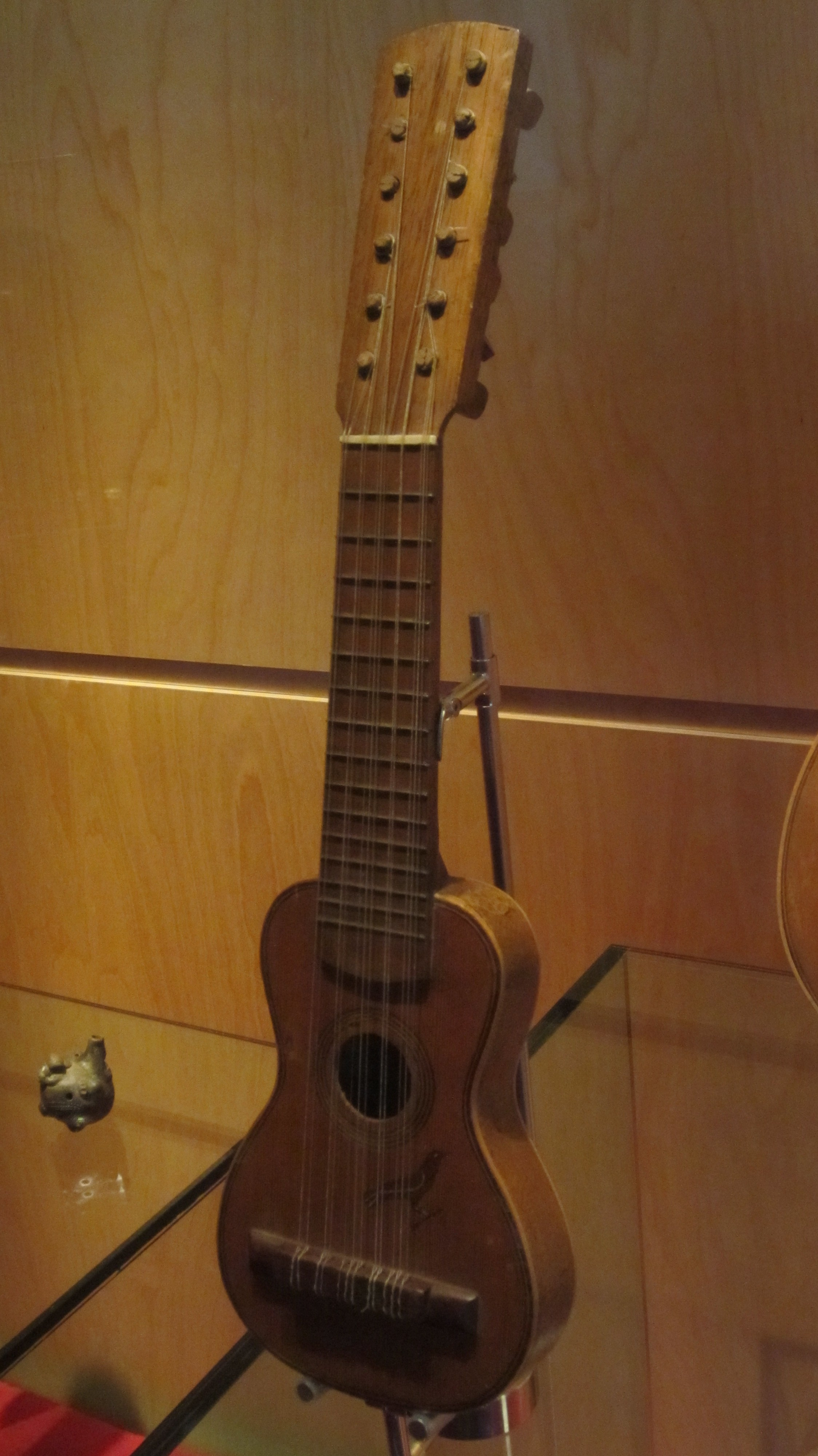
- A chillador of the steel-strung variety, with 12 strings in 5 courses

String instrument
- Classification: Necked bowl lutes; String instruments
- Hornbostel–Sachs classification: 321.321-5
- Developed: Early 18th century (perhaps earlier)

Related instruments
- Charango, Walaychu, Ronroco

The name chillador can refer either to two related types of charango. The first type, simply called chillador, is a type of charango which has a flat back and is usually steel-strung. It exists in both 10-and 12-string forms. When strung with 10-strings (in 5 courses) it is tuned the same as a charango. With 12 strings, courses 2 and 4 are triple-strung, and the (re-entrant) tuning is more like that of a charangon or ronroco in Argentine tuning. The chillador charango is a standardly-tuned charango but with a body built from bent sides and a flat back like a (smaller) guitar.

== Chillador or steel-strung type ==
A chillador is a very small guitar-shaped fretted stringed instrument, usually with 10, 12, or 14 metal strings, in paired or tripled courses. It is played in southern Peru and northern Bolivia. The chillador has 5 courses like its cousin, the charango, and has a similar tuning to the charango. The chillador is a common instrument of estudiantina ensembles, and is typically strummed rapidly, rather than plucked. There are several characteristics that separate a chillador from a charango: The chillador has a smaller scale length (31 cm) than a charango (37 cm); the chillador typically has 12 or 14 metal strings while the charango has 10 strings which are typically nylon; and the chillador has a flat back with laminated wood sides like a guitar, while the charango usually has a one-piece carved wood back or uses an armadillo shell. The chillador is an essential instrument of Kajelo music.

== Chillador charango ==
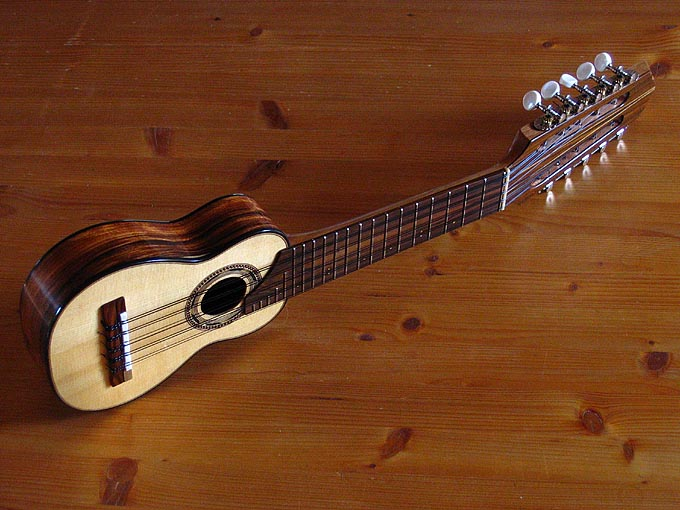
A chillador charango

The chillador charango, also called charango ayacuchano is tuned like a standard charango with 10 nylon strings in 5 courses, but it is built differently, with bent sides and a flat back like a guitar or ukulele. It is often deeper than a ukulele, in order to get a similar sound as the standard carved charango.
