= Dennis Waring =

American historian and ethnomusicologist

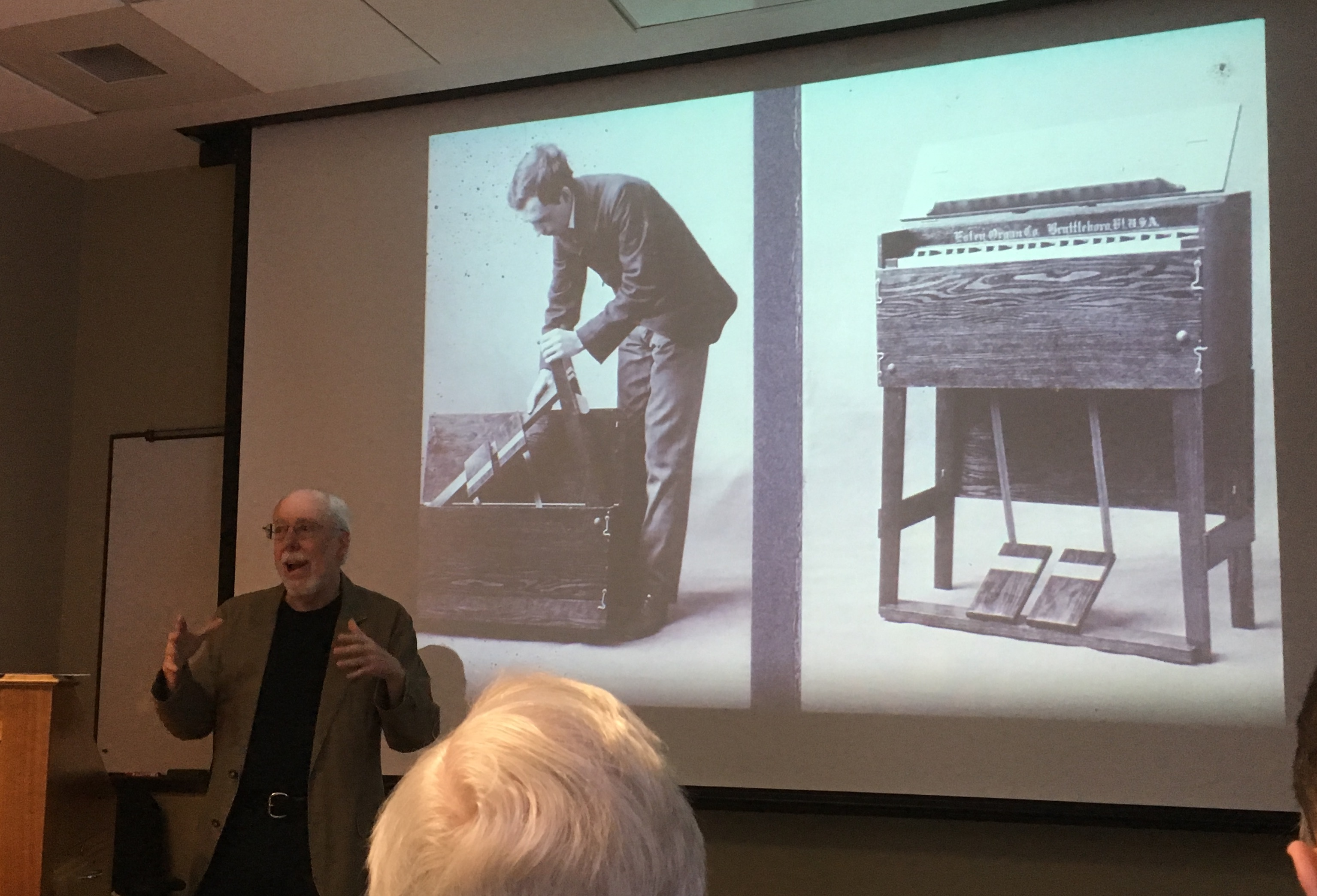
Dennis Waring giving a presentation about Estey Organs at Norwich University, 2019

Dennis Waring is an American multi-instrumentalist musician, teacher, historian and ethnomusicologist. From 2003 to 2004, he was the Connecticut State Troubadour. He wrote a history book on the Estey Organ Company titled Manufacturing the Muse: Estey Organs & Consumer Culture in Victorian America, based on his 1987 doctoral dissertation at Wesleyan University. He was the curator of a world instrument workshop while a graduate student.

In his research, Waring explored Estey organs and the role of musical instruments as "primary cultural indicators". In addition to playing clarinet, mountain dulcimer, fiddle, banjo and drums in several ensembles, he built traditional wooden instruments. In the 1970s Waring began to explore making dulcimers and other instruments from corrugated cardboard and other household materials. He taught others to do the same, wrote books on the subject, and began selling cardboard-instrument kits.

== Publications ==
- Waring, Dennis (1990). Making Wood Folk Instruments. Sterling. ISBN 978-0-8069-7482-8.
- Folk Instruments Make Them & Play Them, It's Easy & It's Fun (1979)
- Great Folk Instruments To Make & Play (1999)
- Cardboard Folk Instruments to Make Play (2000)
- Make Your Own Electric Guitar Bass (2001)
- Manufacturing the Muse: Estey Organs & Consumer Culture in Victorian America (2002)
- Making Drums (2003)
