= Wildflowers (Jonathan Byrd album) =

Studio album by Jonathan Byrd
- Released: 2001
- Recorded: The Rubber Room, Chapel Hill, North Carolina
- Genre: folk, bluegrass, singer-songwriter
- Length: 55:38
- Label: Byrdsong/Waterbug Records
- Producer: Jonathan Byrd & Jerry Brown

Jonathan Byrd chronology
Wildflowers (2001)	The Waitress (2002)

Alternative cover

Professional ratings
Review scores
Source	Rating
Indy Week	(favorable)
Sing Out!	(favorable)

Wildflowers is the 2001 debut album by Jonathan Byrd. The songs are mostly original songs with a few traditional tunes. Here he mixes contemporary singer-songwriter storytelling with Appalachian folk roots. There is even a murder ballad; "Velma" is a song about serial killer Velma Barfield whose victims included Byrd's own grandfather. Sing Out! says, "[Jonathan Byrd's] songwriting melds the lyricism of Celtic music with the stark storytelling of the finest traditional balladeers."

Arthur Wood of Folkwax says that Byrd's "Ashe County Fair" is certain, in time, to become a "folk classic." Byrd explained to Wood: "When I started writing it, I didn't know the girl was going to die."

Byrd says that he learned to play in the alternate guitar tuning DADGAD during two visits to Ireland: "For a personal challenge, I wrote and recorded my entire first album [this album] in that tuning, bringing it into the Old-Time, Bluegrass, and Country idioms." The album includes a couple of instrumentals that allow Byrd to show off his flatpicking skills. Sing Out! described the sound of the album as, "a wonderfully spare collection, allowing the warm expressive vocals of Jonathan and his strong guitar to carry most of the weight of the arrangements." Byrd plays a number of vintage Martin Guitars on the album including a 1936 Martin D-28, a 1937 sunburst D-18, and a 1934 D-18.

== Track listing ==
All songs by Jonathan Byrd except where noted

1. "Wildflowers" – 3:29
2. "Eli's Cotton Gin" – 3:14
3. "Velma" – 3:34
4. "Lady's Fancy" (traditional) – 2:13
5. "Sandy Mush" – 4:03
6. "The Golden Glow of Autumn" – 2:48
7. "Tinytown" – 5:30
8. "Ashe County Fair" – 5:27
9. "Bean an Fhir Rua, Backstep Cindy" (traditional) – 3:27
10. "The Sparrow" – 3:01
11. "Mama" – 2:26
12. "Molly Dear" (traditional) – 3:26
13. "Big Hoedown" (traditional) – 1:57
14. "The Cider Song" – 3:51
15. "Her Eyes Were Green" – 4:16
16. "Robena" – 2:48

== Personnel ==
=== Musicians ===
- Jonathan Byrd – vocals, guitar
- Tim Stambaugh – tenor vocals
- John Boulding – Dobro, banjo
- Russell Johnson – chop mandolin
- Charles Petee – lead mandolin
- Rex McGee – fiddle (tracks 6 & 7)
- Bill Hicks – fiddle (track 15)
- Robbie Link – bass

=== Production ===
- Jerry Brown – co-producer, recording engineer, mastering
  - Recorded at the Rubber Room in Chapel Hill, North Carolina
  - Mastered at The Chop Shop in Chapel Hill, North Carolina

=== Artwork ===
- Hale Dixon Design
  - John Dixon – Graphic art
  - Melissanne Hale Dixon – Photography
