= The Strong in Spirit =

Studio album by Hugh Blumenfeld
- Released: 1988
- Genre: Folk music
- Length: 39:05
- Label: Prime CD
- Producer: David Seitz

Hugh Blumenfeld chronology
The Strong in Spirit (1988)	Barehanded (1993)

Professional ratings
Review scores
Source	Rating
AllMusic	4.5/5 stars

The Strong in Spirit is the debut album by folk artist Hugh Blumenfeld. It was released in 1988 by Prime CD.

== Track listing ==
1. "Brothers" – 2:59
2. "Leather and Lace" – 2:39
3. "Let Me Fall in Love Before the Spring Comes" – 4:02
4. "All of Wood of Lebanon – 3:02
5. "Sailing to the New World – 3:14
6. "Strong in Spirit" – 2:22
7. "Rising Moon" – 3:38
8. "Soweto" – 5:09
9. "I Knew a Boy" – 3:13
10. "Song of Florence" – 5:47
11. "Get the Word" – 3:00

== Personnel ==
- Hugh Blumenfeld - Guitar, Main Performer, Vocals
- Marshall Rosenberg - Percussion, Arranger, Bongos, Conga
- David Seitz - Producer, Remixing, Mixing
- Judith Zweiman - Arranger, Vocals, Harmony Vocals
- Peter Lewy - Arranger, Cello
- Nikki Matheson - Arranger, Harmony Vocals, Vocals
- Arthur Simoes - Photography
- Lucy Kaplansky - Arranger, Harmony Vocals, Vocals
- Diane Chodkowski - Arranger, Harmony Vocals, Vocals
- Kenny Kosek - Violin, Arranger
- Mark Dann - Synthesizer, Guitar, Engineer, Arranger, Mixing, Guitar (Bass), Sampling
- Bill Kollar - ?, Digital Mastering
- Josh Joffen - Arranger, Vocals, Harmony Vocals
- Richard Meyer - Arranger, Vocals, Harmony Vocals
