= Mozart's Money =

Studio album by Hugh Blumenfeld
- Released: 1996
- Genre: Folk
- Length: 41:39
- Label: Prime CD
- Producer: David Seitz

Hugh Blumenfeld chronology
Barehanded (1993)	Mozart's Money (1996)	Rocket Science (1998)

Professional ratings
Review scores
Source	Rating
AllMusic	4.5/5 stars

Mozart's Money is the third album by folk artist Hugh Blumenfeld. It was released in 1996 by Prime CD.

== Track listing ==
1. "Mozart's Money" – 3:15
2. "Raphael" – 3:48
3. "Waiting for the Good Humour Man" – 2:28
4. "This Mountain" – 3:44
5. "Talking Island" – 2:05
6. "Mr. Rain" – 3:22
7. "Main Street Sky" – 3:54
8. "What If You Do Nothing"/"Winter Suite" – 2:46
9. "Sweet October" – 1:18
10. "Sparrowhawk" – 4:11
11. "Blizzard" – 4:28
12. "Friends of a Traveler" – 4:20
13. "Visit" – 2:00
14. (Data Track) – 2:01
15. "When Hiroshima Comes To Disneyland" (Hidden Track) – 2:48

== Personnel ==
- Hugh Blumenfeld - Guitar, Main Performer, Vocals
- Dennis McDermott - Drums
- Marshall Rosenberg - Percussion
- David Seitz - Producer, Mixing, Engineer
- Michael Visceglia - Bass
- Judith Zweiman - Vocals
- Diane Chodkowski - Vocals
- Gideon Freudmann - Cello
- Jeff Colchamiro - Assistant Engineer, Mixing Assistant
- Ray Martin - Mixing
- Lucy Kaplansky - Vocals
- Jack Bashkow - Sax (Alto)
- Mark Dann - Bass, Guitar
- David Hamburger - Pedal Steel
- Margo Hennebach - Piano
- Mindy Jostyn - Harmonica
- Bill Kollar - Mastering
- Harvee Riggs - Artwork concept & design, color photography, digital image design, art direction, pre-press graphic arts
- Andrea Gaines - B&W photos & face painting
- Mark Saunders - Text layout
