= The Waitress =

Studio album by Jonathan Byrd
- Released: 2002
- Recorded: The Rubber Room, Chapel Hill, North Carolina
- Genre: folk, country, blues, singer-songwriter
- Length: 46:37
- Label: Byrdsong/Waterbug
- Producer: Jonathan Byrd

Jonathan Byrd chronology
Wildflowers (2000)	The Waitress (2002)	The Sea and the Sky (2003)

Professional ratings
Review scores
Source	Rating
FolkWax	(9/10)
Indie Music	(favorable)
Sing Out!	(favorable)

The Waitress is the second album by folk singer-songwriter Jonathan Byrd. The album was released in 2003, the same year that Byrd won the New Folk competition at the Kerrville Folk Festival. The Waitress reached No. 20 on the Folk Radio Airplay Chart and has been noted for Byrd's lyrical character sketches and deftly played guitar.

== Track listing ==
1. "The Waitress" (Brown, Byrd) – 3:35
2. "The Ballad of Larry" (Byrd) – 5:01
3. "Radio" (Byrd) – 6:09
4. "The Snake Song" (Byrd) – 2:46
5. "Down the Old Mountain Road" (Byrd) – 1:56 [instrumental]
6. "My Generation" (Byrd) – 3:57
7. "Small Town" (Byrd) – 3:12
8. "Tape Full of Love Songs" (Byrd) – 3:17
9. "Stackalee" (traditional) – 4:04
10. "Home Sweet Home" (traditional) – 2:19 [instrumental]
11. "Being With You" (Byrd) – 3:06
12. "Fiddle and Bow" (traditional) – 3:34
13. "Rosie" (Byrd) – 3:32

== Personnel ==
Musicians:

- Jonathan Byrd – guitar & vocals
- Jason Cade – fiddle
- David DiGiuseppe – accordion
- Robbie Link – bass & cello

Production:

- Jonathan Byrd – producer
- Jerry Brown – recording, mixing, mastering

at The Rubber Room, Chapel Hill, North Carolina

Artwork:

- Melanie Litchfield – photography
- F.J. Ventre – graphic design at Tadpole Designs

== Charts ==
date	chart	peak
July 2003	Folk Radio Airplay Chart	20
