= Hugh Blumenfeld =

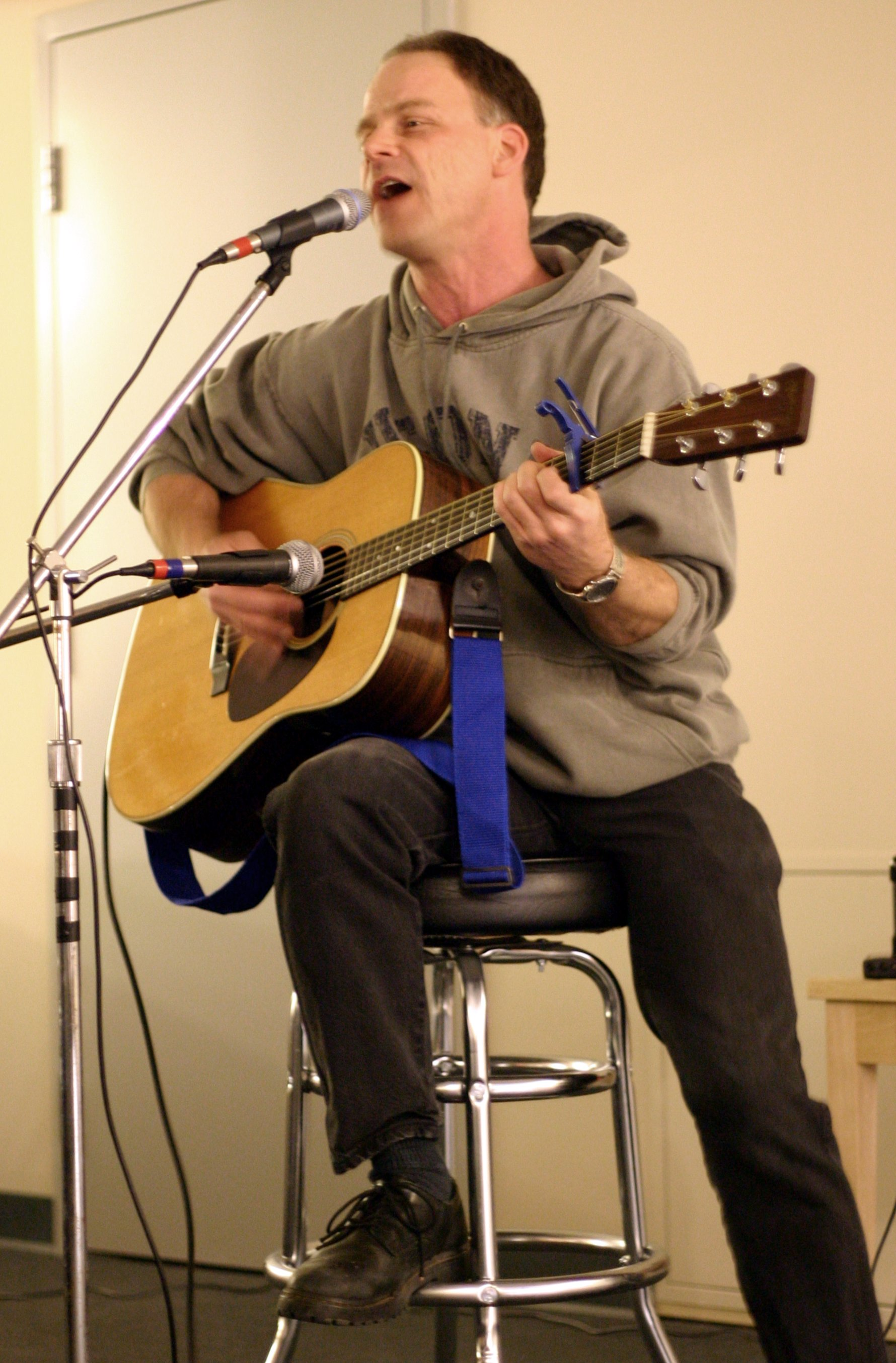
- Hugh Blumenfeld performs at the University of Connecticut in 2009.

Background information
- Born: October 11, 1958 (age 67); Jamaica, Queens, New York City
- Genres: Folk
- Occupations: Musician; doctor
- Years active: 1994–present
- Labels: Grace Avenue Records; Prime CD; Brambus; Waterbug
- Website: hughblumenfeld.com

Hugh Blumenfeld (born October 11, 1958) is an American folk musician and singer-songwriter from Connecticut. He was born in Jamaica, Queens, New York City, graduated with degrees in Biology and Humanities from M.I.T. in 1980, and got a master's degree in English Literature from the University of Chicago in 1981. He was active in the Greenwich Village music scene in the 1980s, attending the Cornelia Street Songwriters Exchange and performing at Folk City and Speak Easy while working on a PhD in Poetics from New York University. He also helped to edit the Fast Folk Musical Magazine (now part of the Smithsonian-Folkways collection) and recorded songs for a dozen issues. After earning his PhD in 1991, he worked as an English professor until 1994, when he began writing and performing full-time. Over the next 10 years he toured mainly in the Northeast and Midwest, with several short tours in Europe and one in Israel. In 1999 he was appointed Connecticut State Troubadour.

In the fall of 2003, he enrolled in medical school at the University of Connecticut and became an MD. He currently practices family medicine in Hartford, Connecticut, and continues to perform as part of a folk quintet, The Faithful Sky with long-time collaborators including Jim Mercik.

== Recordings ==
Blumenfeld's first album, The Strong in Spirit, was self-released as an LP in late 1987. It featured performances by Lucy Kaplansky, Marshal Rosenberg, Kenny Kosek and Mark Dann, and was produced by David Seitz. It includes "Let Me Fall In Love Before the Spring Comes," which was later included in on a Winter's Night, a popular compilation edited by Christine Lavin. In 1993, Barehanded became the first release of the New York-based independent label Prime-CD.

In 1996, Blumenfeld released Mozart's Money, a more highly produced album that helped him gain a national audience through reviews and indie radio airplay. AllMusic praised it as a leap forwards with its more "confident" and "radio-friendly" sound. Lucy Kaplansky and Mark Dann feature prominently and are joined by Michael Visceglia (of Suzanne Vega's band) and Mindy Jostyn. Rocket Science, the last of his Prime-CD recordings, came out in 1998; AllMusic noted its "brave", "bold" and "endearingly honest songs" in a 3/5 review. In 2000, he recorded Big Red in Switzerland for the Brambus record label with percussionist Shane Shannahan, who later joined Yo Yo Ma's Silk Road Project, and popular Swiss country music singer Doris Ackermann. In 2010, his CD Dad was released on Waterbug Records.

== Discography ==
- The Strong in Spirit (1988)
- Barehanded (1993)
- Mozart's Money (1996)
- Rocket Science (1998)
- Big Red (2000)
- Mr Jekyll and Dr Hyde (1998, 2004)

Compilations:

- On A Winter's Night (Rounder)
- Big League Babe: Tribute to Christine Lavin, Vol. 2 (Prime-CD).
- Postcrypt (Prime-CD)
- The Folk Next Door (WWUH-FM)
- Fast Folk
- Fast Folk Musical Magazine: A Community of Songwriters (Smithsonian-Folkways, 2002)
