= Bill Pere =

American songwriter

Bill Pere is an American, multiple-award-winning singer, songwriter, producer, musician, author, and playwright.

== Biography ==
Pere grew up in New York City and today resides in Connecticut. He is a graduate of Bucknell University in Lewisburg, Pennsylvania.

== Professional life ==
Pere was named one of the "Top 50 Innovators, Groundbreakers, Iconoclasts, and Guiding Lights of the Music Industry" by Music Connection magazine in December 2008. His accomplishments include being named Connecticut State Troubadour in 1995 and an Independent Music Conference - "Immie" Award winner for Best Independent Artist in 2003. Pere has written more than 400 songs and released 16 CDs, as well as producing CDs for many other artists.

Pere is a founding member and current president of the Connecticut Songwriters' Association, and is a founder and executive director of the Local United Network to Combat Hunger (LUNCH), which features the LUNCH Ensemble. Along with Kay Pere, also a nationally known recording artist, he runs the Connecticut Songwriting Academy to develop the talents and careers of young singers, songwriters, musicians, and recording artists. Pere has been involved in the music business for more than 30 years, having been mentored by many of the top names in the industry. He uses music for social activism, fighting hunger and poverty, and was named a "Hunger Fighting Hero" by Wakefern Foods in 2009, and was featured on a special edition Cheerios box.

In 2009, Pere released his book, Songcrafters' Coloring Book: The Essential Guide to Effective and Successful Songwriting, which presents 30 years of research and insights into the nature of songwriting. This is an outgrowth of a series of articles by Pere on songwriting and the music industry, published in the 1980s and 1990s, known as The Songcrafters' Coloring Book. Pere presents workshops and classes at music conferences and events across the U.S.

== Recordings ==
1981: Crest of a Wave [vinyl]
198?: Cityscape [vinyl]
198?: Family Portrait [out of print]
1991: Songs for Kids Who Like to Think
1994: You'll See a Much Brighter Day
1994: Songs for Kids With Common Sense
1994: Profiles of Connecticut Vol 1
1995: Songs for Kids Who Touch the Stars
1999: New Day Coming Tomorrow
2001: Crest of a Wave (10th Anniversary - New Recordings)
2001: Cityscape II
2002: High School My School
2002: Christmas Eve on the Poor Side of Town
2004: Profiles of Connecticut Special Edition
2007: Dare to Dream
2010: Voices For Hope

plus numerous inclusions on compilation CDs

== See also ==
- Bartholomew Cubbins
