= Ronroco =

Andean stringed instrument

String instrument
- Classification: Necked bowl lutes; String instruments
- Hornbostel–Sachs classification: 321.321-5
- Developed: 1968, but with roots back to the 18th century or earlier

Related instruments
- Charango, Walaychu, Chillador, Ponputu, Khonkhota

The ronroco (also spelt ronrroco) is a bass or baritone member of the charango family, with a 44–50-centimetre scale length. It was invented in 1968 by brothers Gonzalo and Wilson Hermosa, of the group Los Kjarkas from Cochabamba, Bolivia, and spread to common usage during the 1980s. In the 1990s and 2000s, it was further popularised by Argentinian musician and composer Gustavo Santaolalla.

Ronrocos have 10 strings in five courses. They are built from carved wood or bent sides (like modern charangos), and not from an armadillo shell (in the manner of older charangos).

== Tunings ==
Common tunings include:

- D4 D4, G4 G4, B4 B3, E4 E4, B4 B4 (A fourth below charango, sometimes called Argentinian tuning or Bolivian tuning)
- G3 G3, C3 C3, E4 E3, A3 A3, E4 E4 (One octave below charango, sometimes called Chilean tuning)
- D4 D3, G4 G3, B4 B3, E4 E4, B4 B4 (Octave strings on the lower courses)
- G3 G2, C3 C2, E4 E3, A3 A3, E4 E4 (Octave strings on the lower courses)
- C4 C4, F4 F4, A4 A3, D4 D4, A4 A4 (Also sometimes called Bolivian tuning)
