= Walaycho =

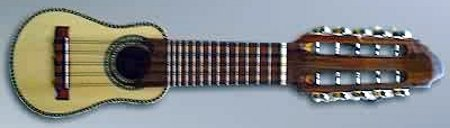
- A walaycho

String instrument
- Other names: Hualaycho, walaychu
- Classification: Necked bowl lutes; String instruments
- Hornbostel–Sachs classification: 321.321-5 (Composite chordophone sounded by the bare fingers)
- Developed: Early 18th century (perhaps earlier)

Related instruments
- Charango, Chillador, Ronroco

The walaycho (hispanicized spelling hualaycho, also walaychu) is a small lute-like fretted stringed instrument, the smallest member of the charango family. It is the same or similar to the maulincho. The walaychu along with the charango and its variations are believed to have been born around Cerro Rico of Potosí located in Bolivia.

The word walaychu is Quechua meaning 'a lazy man, someone who always lays on the ground everywhere. In addition to this, an evil man'. It's a colloquial word in Bolivia for a small charango variant.
