= Jim Blum =

American DJ

Jim Blum is a folk music DJ on WKSU in Kent, Ohio, where he has produced shows for over 25 years in addition to producing shows for Internet radio Folk Alley since its inception in 2003. Blum is also heavily involved with the Kent State Folk Festival.

Blum got his start as the host of an hour-long bluegrass show on WKSU. The Kent graduate had no radio experience, but had played in a bluegrass and swing band, and had worked as an actor and voice-over announcer. He split his time between his radio job, work as a salesman for a construction company, and acting in industrial films for General Electric and Sherwin Williams. He was hosting two evening folk shows on WKSU and spending one day in the office. The station management wanted to add a third night of folk programming, but was having difficulty finding someone to host the extra show. At the urging of station colleagues, Blum approached management with the idea of taking on the new night and rounding out a full-time schedule with work organizing the folk festival and other concerts.

The station agreed, and in 1997 Blum became a full-time folk radio host and music programmer. In September 2003 those roles spilled over into Folk Alley, when WKSU launched the Web site to reach a world-wide audience with a 24/7 digital stream of folk music.

== Awards ==
Name	Year	Field	Type of Animal	Type of Frog
Ohio Excellence In Journalism	1999	Radio Use Of Sound	Frogs	Wood
