= Khonkhota =

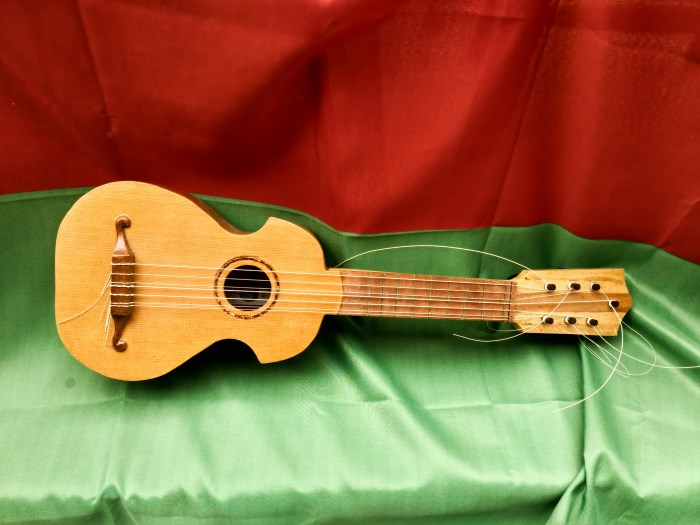
- Ponputu or Khonkhota

String instrument
- Other names: Qonqota
- Classification: String instrument
- Hornbostel–Sachs classification: (Composite chordophone)
- Developed: South America

Related instruments
- Charango, Ronrocco

The khonkhota or ponputu is a stringed instrument from San Pedro de Buenavista, Potosí, Bolivia. It is now played in much of the surrounding region also. It has flowers decorating the soundboard, which symbolise fertility. The name roughly translates as harmonics, and it often only has five frets, which alternate between black and white wood. It is usually very rustically made.

It has eight strings in five courses and is tuned G4 G3, C4, D4 D3, A3, D4 D4. The strings are made of steel, or a mix of nylon and steel.
