= Rachel Bissex =

American singer (1956–2005)

- Born: December 27, 1956; Boston, Massachusetts, U.S.
- Died: February 20, 2005 (aged 48) Burlington, Vermont, U.S.
- Genres: Folk music
- Occupation: Singer-songwriter
- Instruments: Vocals; guitar

Rachel Bissex (December 27, 1956 – February 20, 2005) was an American folk singer-songwriter. Her works included "Dancing With My Mother" and "Drive All Night".

== Death ==
Bissex died in 2005, aged 48, in Burlington, Vermont from breast cancer.

== Legacy ==
- Rachel Bissex Memorial College Fund

== Discography ==
- Light in Dark Places (1991)
- Don't Look Down (1995)
- I Used to Be Nice (1998)
- Between the Broken Lines (2001)
- In White Light (2004)
- Tribute-CD: Remembering Rachel. Songs of Rachel Bissex (2005)
