= Chuck Brodsky =

American musician and singer-songwriter

- Born: May 20, 1960 (age 65); Philadelphia, Pennsylvania, US
- Genres: Folk music, singer-songwriter, Americana
- Occupations: Songwriter, musician, storyteller
- Years active: 1995–present
- Labels: Waterbug Records, Red House Records, ChuckBrodsky.com Records
- Website: Chuck Brodsky

Chuck Brodsky (born May 20, 1960, in Philadelphia, Pennsylvania) is an American musician and singer-songwriter currently living in Asheville, North Carolina. He is particularly known for his often humorous and political lyrics, as well as his songs about baseball, such as "The Ballad of Eddie Klep", "Moe Berg: The Song", and "Doc Ellis' No-No".

On his 2004 album Color Came One Day, he took on pollution in "Seven Miles Upwind", the destruction of independent business and regional culture by multinational corporations in "Trees Falling", and the abridgement of civil liberties associated with Bush administration policies in "Dangerous Times".

== Biography ==
Brodsky's song "Radio" was featured in the film Radio. Another song, called "Bill and Annie", was featured in episode 3 of the podcast Welcome to Night Vale made by Commonplace Books. Several of his songs have appeared in films and documentaries on ESPN, NPR, NFL Films, PBS, and ABC's Good Morning America, and Dr. Demento's show. "Moe Berg: The Song" is featured in the film Jews and Baseball: An American Love Story. "Whitey & Harry" is featured in A Baseball Life (produced by the Philadelphia Phillies about Richie Ashburn).

== Discography ==
- A Fingerpainter's Murals (1995)
- Letters in the Dirt (1996)
- Radio (1998)
- Last of the Old Time (2000)
- The Baseball Ballads (2002)
- Color Came One Day (2004)
- Tulips For Lunch (2006)
- Two Sets (2008)
- Subtotal Eclipse (2011)
- The Baseball Ballads 2 (2013)
- Tell Tale Heart (2015)
- Them and Us (2018)
- Gravity, Wings, and Heavy Things (2022)
