= Connecticut State Troubadour =

Ambassador of music and cultural literacy

The Connecticut State Troubadour is an honorary position, established in 1991 by the Connecticut General Assembly. The State Troubadour functions as an ambassador of music and song and promotes cultural literacy among Connecticut citizens. It began as an annual position, in 1999 was changed to a two-year appointment, and in 2018 was changed to a three-year appointment; as of 2005 it carries a $5,000 total stipend. The responsibilities of the position include performing at least three events at the request of the Connecticut Commission on Culture & Tourism, promoting the state in song, and serving on panels to select future state troubadours.

== Post holders ==
1. Tom Callinan - 1991–1992
2. Sandy and Caroline Paton - 1993
3. Phil Rosenthal - 1994
4. Bill Pere - 1995
5. Mike Kachuba - 1996
6. Sally Rogers (singer) - 1997
7. Jeff and Synia McQuillan - 1998
8. Hugh Blumenfeld - 1999–2000
9. Kevin Briody - 2001–2002
10. Dennis Waring - 2003–2004
11. Thomasina Levy - 2005-2006
12. Pierce Campbell - 2007-2008
13. Lara Herscovitch - 2009-2010
14. Chuck Costa - 2011-2012
15. Kristen Graves - 2013-2015
16. Kate Callahan - 2016-2018
17. Nekita Waller - 2018-2021
18. Kala Farnham - 2022-2025
19. Charlie Widmer - 2026
