= Charangon =

The Charangón is a small lute-like fretted stringed instrument, of the charango family.

Its general shape and construction are very similar to the charango, but it is larger and is typically pitched 3 or 4 diatonic intervals lower (a "4th" or a "5th respectively) than a standard charango.

The overall length varies from 70 to 80 cm, and the string length between 40 and 50 cm.

The "re" charangón ( a "5th" below a standard charango) is typically tuned: do-do, fa-fa, la-LA, re-re, la-la (cc,ff,aA,dd,aa) where the "la" ("a") is "concert a" (between 415 and 450 Hz). Note that this will play a D minor 7th chord with the open strings. (In the above example, the "la" is the course closest to the floor in normal right-handed convention).

The tuning above is re-entrant, so that the "do" of the 5th course is only one whole tone below the "re" course. See the charango for details of this tuning arrangement.

Other charangons are typically tuned with the same pattern, but may be either a whole tone up or down, or even a 4th lower. Sometimes courses other than the middle course have octave strings (typically a lower octave than shown).

It is bigger than the Charango, hence the 'ón' ending on the name denoting the charangón's larger size.
