= Charango =

Small Andean stringed instrument of the lute family

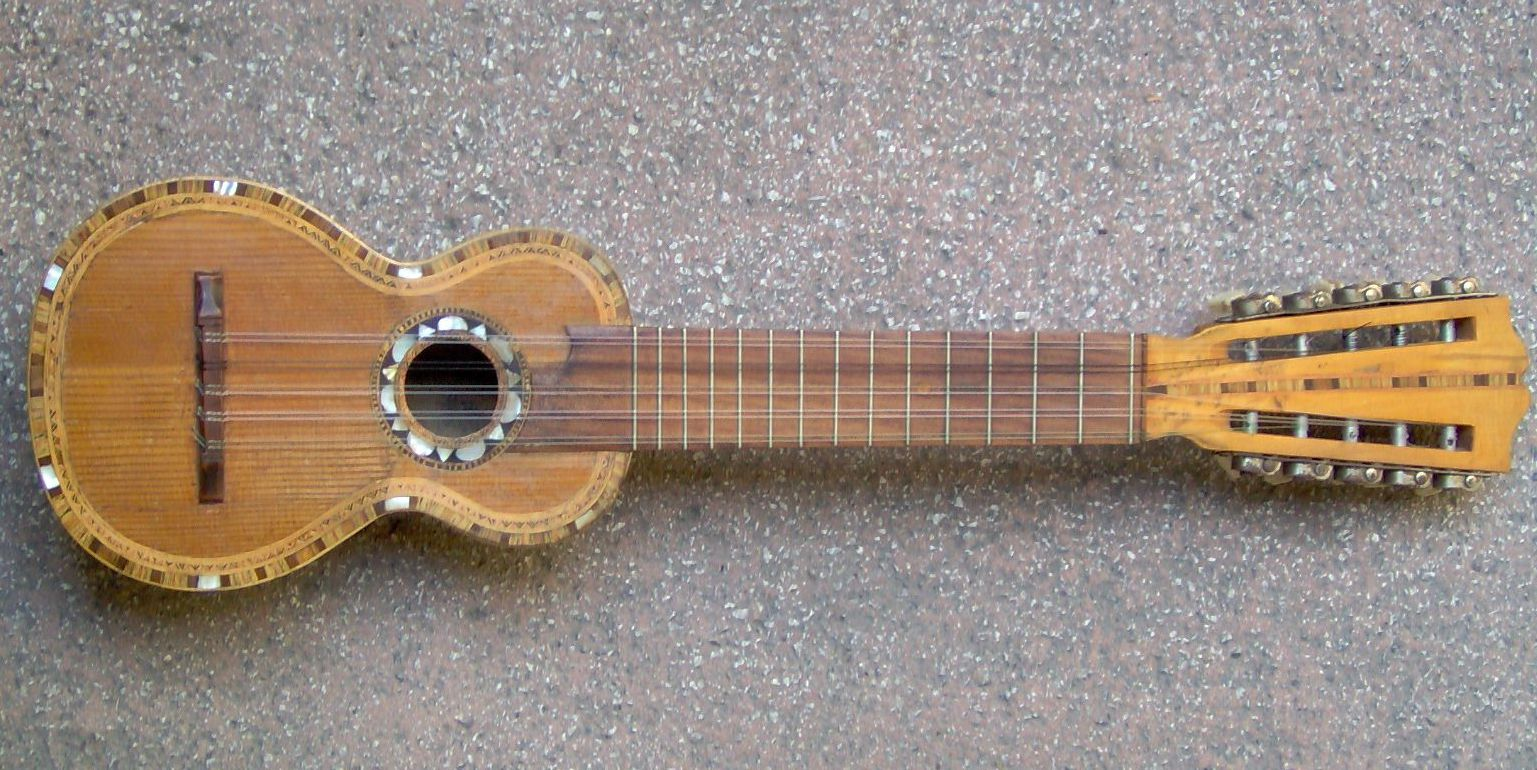
- A modern charango

String instrument
- Other names: Quirquincho, Mulita, Tatu, Kirki
- Hornbostel–Sachs classification: 321.321–5 (Composite chordophone sounded by the bare fingers)
- Developed: Early 18th century (perhaps earlier)

Playing range
- E4 – (G6) Charango tuning (Am7/E)

Related instruments
- Walaycho; Chillador; Ronroco; et al (see text). Concheras (also has armadillo back)

Cultural Heritage of Peru
- Official name: Charango
- Type: Intangible
- Criteria: Music and dances
- Designated: 4 July 2007; 19 years ago
- Legal basis: R.D.N. 1136/INC-2007

Video of a charango being played

The charango is a small Andean stringed instrument of the lute family, from the Quechua and Aymara populations in the territory of the Altiplano in post-Colonial times, after European stringed instruments were introduced by the Spanish during colonization. The instrument is widespread throughout the Andean regions of Bolivia, Peru, Ecuador, northern Chile and northwestern Argentina, where it is a popular musical instrument that exists in many variant forms.

About 66 cm (26 in) long, the charango was traditionally made with the shell from the back of an armadillo (called quirquincho or mulita in South American Spanish), but it can also be made of wood, which some believe to be a better resonator. Wood is more commonly used in modern instruments. Charangos for children may also be made from calabash. Many contemporary charangos are now made with different types of wood. It typically has ten strings in five courses of two strings each, but many other variations exist.

The charango was primarily played in traditional Andean music. A charango player is called a charanguista (charanguist).

== History ==
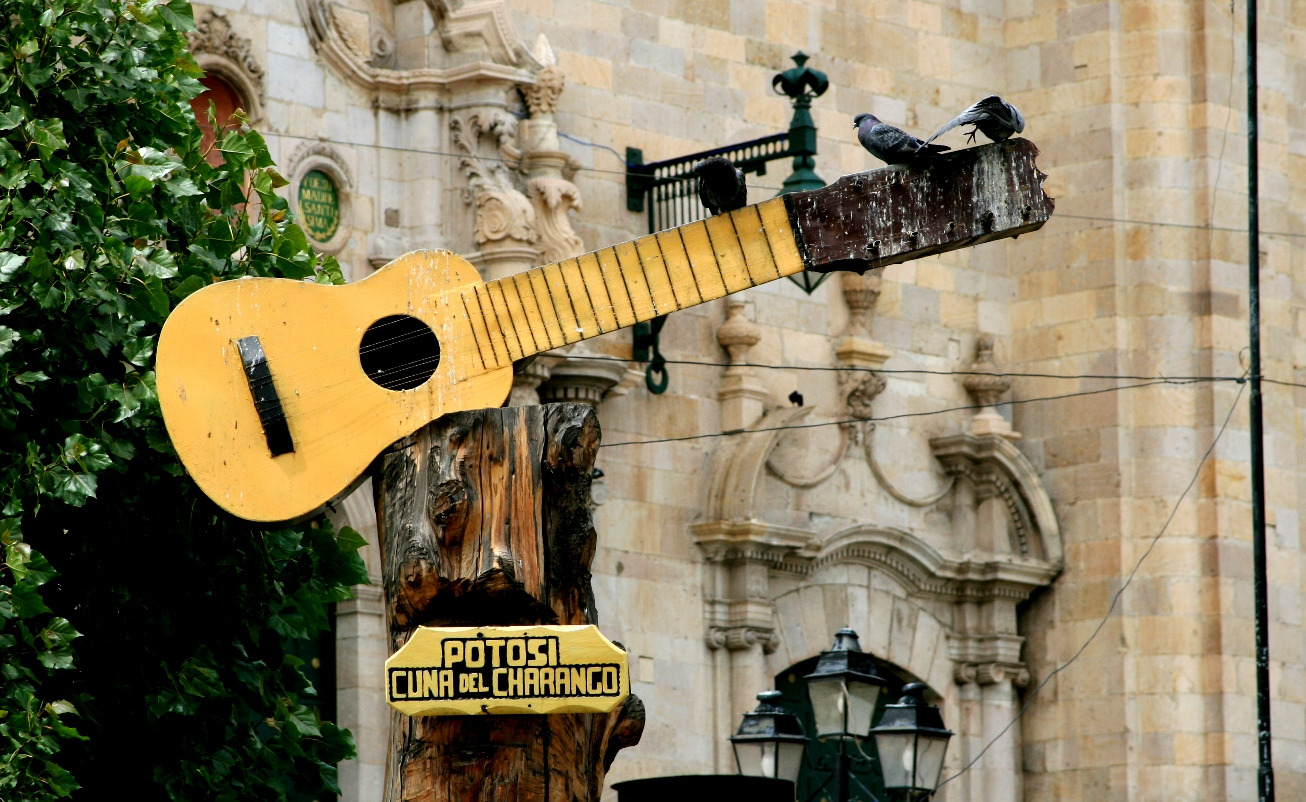
A sign in Potosi, Bolivia, in the style of a charango with the words 'Cuna del Charango' (Birthplace of the Charango)

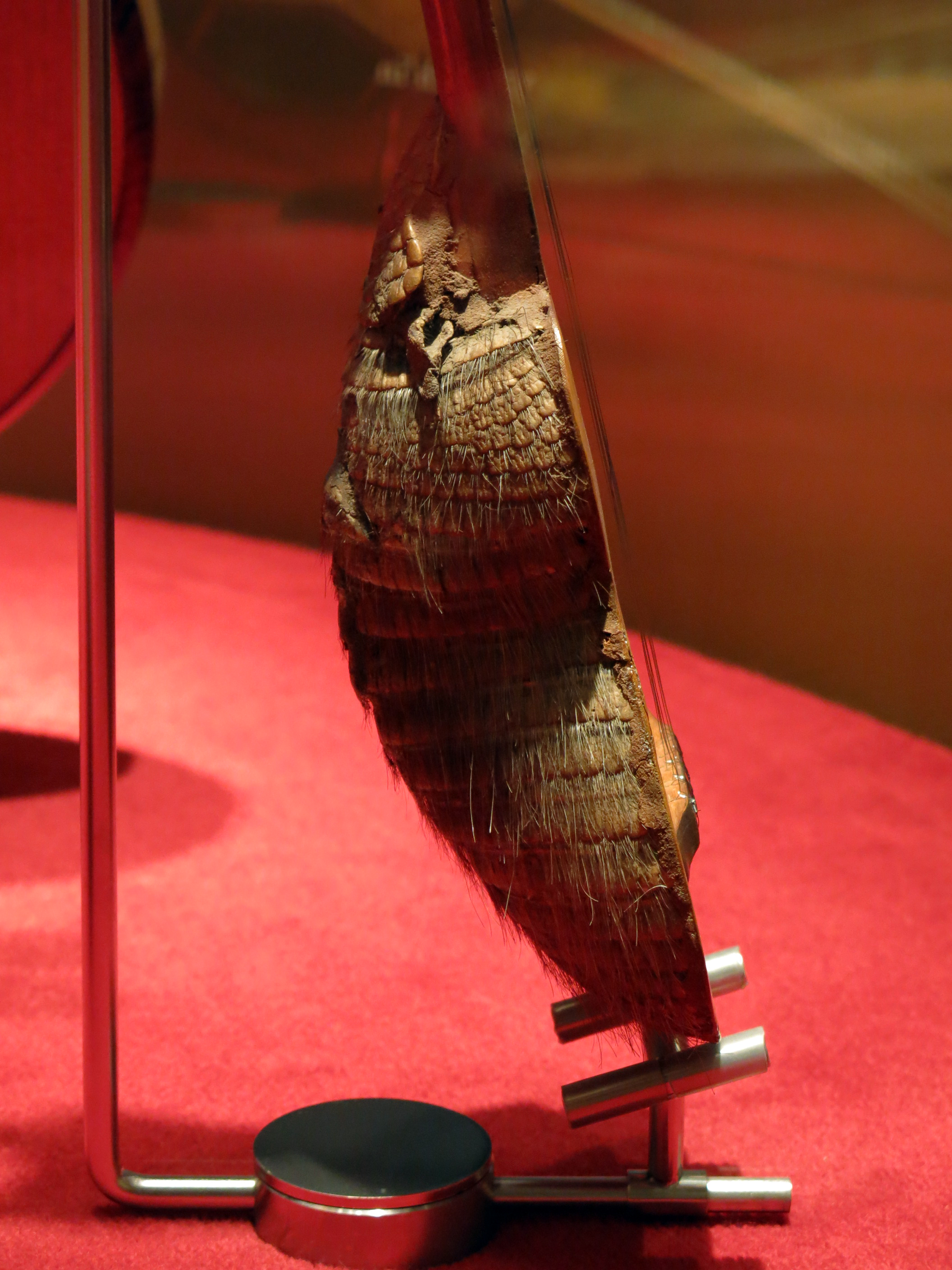
A traditional charango made of armadillo, today superseded by wooden charangos, in Museu de la Música de Barcelona

When the Spanish conquistadors came to South America, they brought the vihuela (an ancestor of the classical guitar) with them. It is not clear whether the charango is a direct descendant of a particular Spanish stringed instrument; it may have evolved from the vihuela, bandurria (mandolin), or the lute. Ernesto Cavour, Bolivian charanguista, composer, and consulting music historian for many museums around the world, has noted characteristics of the charango in various vihuelas and guitars of the 16th century, and maintains the charango is the direct descendant of the vihuela.

There are many stories of how the charango came to be made with its distinctive diminutive soundbox of armadillo. One story says that the native musicians liked the sound the vihuela made, but lacked the technology to shape the wood in that manner. Another story says that the Spaniards prohibited natives from practicing their ancestral music, and that the charango was a successful attempt to make a lute that could be easily hidden under a garment such as a poncho.

There is no clear evidence that points to a specific location or moment in time for the birth of the charango but there are a number of theories being debated. One of those is that it is believed the charango came into its present form in the early 18th century in the city of Potosí in the Royal Audiencia of Charcas part of the Viceroyalty of Peru (in what is present-day Bolivia), probably from Amerindian contact with Spanish settlers. Cavour presents evidence from Bolivian murals and sculptures as early as 1744, in, for example, the Church of San Lorenzo of the city of Potos (Potosí), the facade of which depicts two mermaids playing what he believes to be charangos.

Another two theories that are being researched are that the Charango originally came to Potosí from the Ayacucho region in colonial Peru as a result of migration within the Quechua populations. This suggests that the charango originated in the territory of what is now Peru via cultural exchange and then spread to the rest of the Andean area. This theory has not been proven either.

Because the modern states of Peru and Bolivia had not yet been established at the time, it is difficult to trace the charango's origin to a specific country, and the issue remains highly debated among nationalists from both countries.

One Bolivian musician has posited a third theory which is that the Charango was created as a variant of the timple canario from the Canary islands. More research however is required.

The first published historic information on the charango may be that gathered by Vega, going back to 1814, when a cleric from Tupiza documented that "the Indians used with much enthusiasm the guitarrillos mui fuis... around here in the Andes of Bolivia they called them Charangos". Turino mentions that he found carved sirens representing playing charangos in some Colonial churches in the highlands of Bolivia. One of the churches to which Turino refers may well be that mentioned by Cavour; construction on the San Lorenzo edifice began in 1547 and wasn't completed until 1744.

According to Eduardo Carrasco of Quilapayún, in the first week after the 1973 Chilean coup d'etat, the military organized a meeting with folk musicians where it was explained that the traditional instruments charango and quena were now banned.

=== Etymology ===
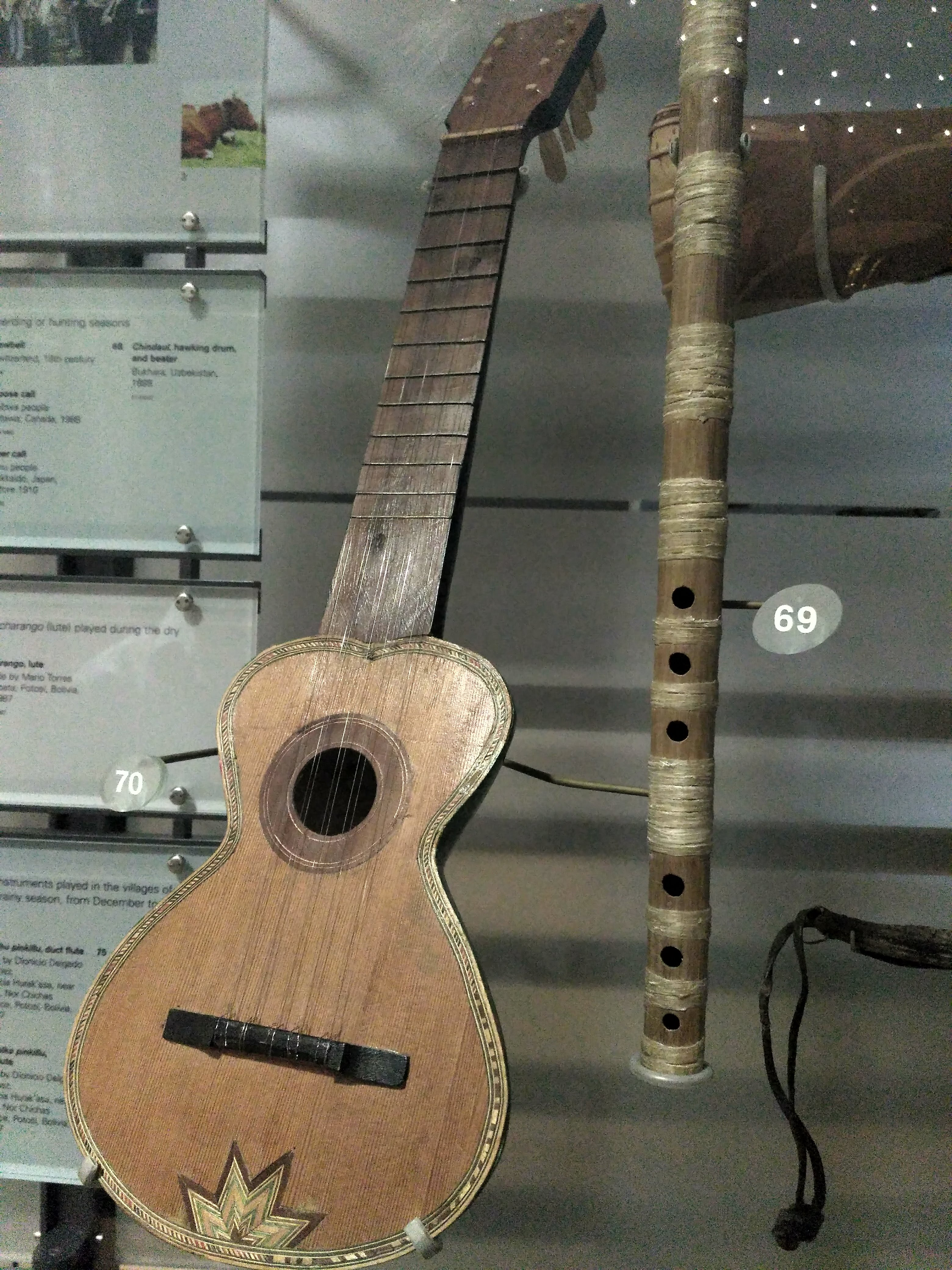
Charango in the Horniman museum, London, UK

The origin of the term "charango" is not entirely clear. One source suggests that the instrument took its name from its players, who were called charangeros, meaning "someone of questionable character and low morals". Another traces the term to the alteration of a Spanish term, charanga, which could refer to either a type of military music played on wind instruments, or an out-of-tune orchestra. Charanguista Alfredo Coca, offers yet a third theory: asserting that "charango" comes from a Spanish corruption of the Quechua word Chajwaku, which means joy, noisy, boisterous, referring directly to the sound of the charango. As support for this he points to the common practice of the Conquistadors appropriating local terminology.

Charanguista Ernesto Cavour disagrees, and tends to support the second origin, maintaining that the word "charango" comes from a mispronunciation of the Spanish word charanga, meaning "brass band" (a reasonable corollary to 'military music played on wind instruments').

One of the most complete contemporary statements on the origin of the term "charango" appears in the introduction to Duran and Pedrotti's, Charango Method, ostensibly the first complete, bilingual charango method to be published:

"Charango" is an Ibero-American colonial term that refers to a series of Spanish-American cultural concepts related to "noise" and rustically constructed objects. The term "charanga", for example, was often used to refer to a small instrumental band. "Charanguero", meanwhile, denoted something rough or rustic. In his book El charango, su vida, costumbres y desaventuras, Ernesto Cavour has collected a large amount of information regarding the etymology of the word "charango". As this author related:

"In the rural areas of Andean Bolivia, the instrument is not only known by the name "charango", but by many others as well, including: mediana, guitarrilla, thalachi, quirqui, p'alta, khonkhota, aiquileno, guitarron, anzaldeno, etc. ..."

An Uruguan publication from 1823 uses the term "changango" as a synonym for the Argentine "charango", and claims the same word was used during the eighteenth century to refer to old and poorly constructed guitars:

"...In Argentina they speak of the Charango, a guitar with five doubled strings and a body made from the shell of an Armadillo. Nevertheless, the small Spanish-American guitar has been known by the name changango for more than one hundred years. In a footnote to his correspondence with Paulino Lucero regarding the Great War, Hilario Ascasubi explains this situation with indisputable clarity: "Changango: an old, poorly made guitar".
(Excerpt from the newspaper "El Domador", Montecivideo, 19 March 1823).

Julio Mendivil engages in a similarly detailed discussion of this issue in his article La construccion de la historia: el charango en la memoria colectiva mestiza ayacuchana, Musicology Institut/University of Colonia."

== Construction ==
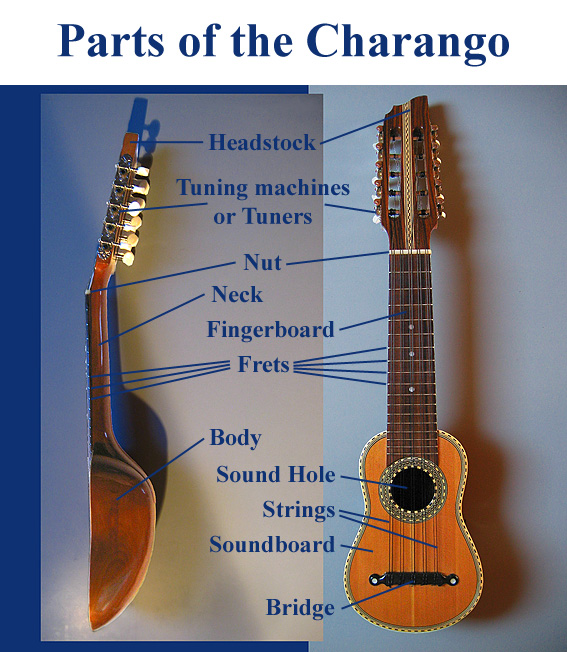
Designation of the parts of the charango

Traditionally a charango was made with a dried armadillo shell for the back and wood for the soundbox top, neck etc. While still common, this is no longer the norm: rather they are now typically made of wood, with the bowled back merely imitating the shape of the armadillo shell. Unlike most wooden lutes, the body and neck are typically made of a single block of wood, carved into shape. The charango's ten strings require quite a large headstock, often approaching or even exceeding the size of its diminutive sound box. Aside from these visual distinctions, it resembles something between a bowl-backed mandolin and a small ukulele.

The overall length of a typical charango is about 66 centimetres (26 in), with a string scale length of about 37 centimetres (15 in). The number of frets ranges from five to eighteen. The most common form of the instrument has ten strings of nylon, gut, or (less commonly) metal. (Variant forms of the charango may have anywhere from four to fifteen strings, in various combinations of single, double, or triple courses.) The body generally has a narrowed waist, reminiscent of the guitar family, and not the pear-shape of the lute. There are many minor variations in the shape of the body and soundboard (top), and many different kinds of wood are used, although, like guitars, the preferred tone woods for the top come from the cedar or spruce families. Old instruments had friction-style tuning pegs (similar to those used on violins), but today a classical guitar style peghead with geared "machine" tuners is the norm, though these are occasionally positioned perpendicular to the headstock. Most instruments include some degree of ornamentation, which may range from simple purfling inlays around the perimeter of the top, to elaborately carved headstocks, and whole scenes engraved, carved, or burned into the back of the body. Strap buttons are sometimes added, as are position marker dots on the fingerboard.

Variations may include a separate glued-on neck, a two-piece top plate of contrasting woods, old-style friction tuning pegs in palisander or ebony, guitar-style box construction, or even a hollowed-out neck. The size, shape, and number of soundholes is highly variable and may be a single round or oval hole, dual crescents, or even multiple holes of varying arrangement. Another variant is a neck with two holes bored 3/4 of the way through, parallel to the fretboard and close to the headstock (an innovation said to color the instrument's tone).

More recently solid-body electric and hollow-body acoustic-electric charangos have become available. The solid-body instruments are built very much as miniature electric guitars, whereas the acoustic-electrics are usually a standard acoustic charango with the addition of a contact microphone or piezoelectric pickup to run the output of the instrument through an amplifier.

In his book The Motorcycle Diaries, Che Guevara described a charango he saw near Temuco, Chile, in 1952. It was "made with three or four wires some two meters in length stretched tightly across tins fixed to a board. The musician uses a kind of metal knuckle duster with which he plucks the wires producing a sound like a toy guitar."

== Tuning ==
The basic charango has five pairs (or courses) of strings, typically tuned GCEAE. This tuning, disregarding octaves, is similar to the typical C-tuning of the ukulele or the Venezuelan cuatro, with the addition of a second E-course. Unlike most other stringed instruments, all ten strings are tuned inside one octave. The five courses are pitched as follows (from 5th to 1st course): G4 G4 • C5 C5 • E5 E4 • A4 A4 • E5 E5. Some charanguistas use "octave" strings on other pairs in addition to the middle course. Note that the lowest pitch is the "E" string in the middle (3rd) course, preceded by the higher pitched "g" (5th) course and "c" (4th) course, and followed by still higher pitched "a" (2nd) course and "e" (1st) courses. This tuning pattern is known as a re-entrant pattern because the pitches of the strings do not rise steadily from one string or course to the next, but progress from high to low and then back to high pitch again.

A charango player

The ramifications of the charango tuning are that there is a very narrow tonal range in most chords, often with many pitch duplications, which produces a surprisingly powerful sound from the small instrument. Seventh and ninth chords shimmer more than on a guitar due to the close harmonies. In terms of melody playing, the charanguista can create a harp-like sound with close intervals ringing out (i.e., like a piano with the sustain pedal engaged). With the close pitch spacing across strings (intervals like 2nds), a simple alternating finger-style pattern in the right hand can produce very rapid chromatic and diatonic runs with only minimal movement of the left hand on the fingerboard. This makes the charango an extremely agile melodic instrument, especially when compared to instruments traditionally played with a flat pick.

As with any stringed instrument, tunings for the charango may vary, but the "standardized" tunings most commonly used (for the 10-stringed, five-course version) are:

Charango tuning (Am7)

Notes of charango

Course	Am7 tuning	Comments
5	G4 G4 (391.99 Hz, above middle C)	2nd lowest tone, nearest the face
4	C5 C5 (523.25 Hz)	"C" above Middle C
3	E5 E4 (659.26 Hz, 329.63 Hz)	Strings are tuned an octave apart
2	A4 A4 (440.00 Hz)	"A" above Middle C
1	E5 E5 (659.26 Hz)	Highest tone, nearest the floor

G#m7 and Gm7 tunings are achieved by tuning a semitone or a full step down, respectively. Em7 is achieved by tuning down by a perfect fourth.

== Types ==
There are metal string, nylon/gut string, and mixed-string charangos. Some metal-stringed versions have all strings at the same gauge. There are also solid-body electric charangos.

There are many types of charango. In many cases the variant is named for the town or region in which it originated, or in which it is most frequently seen, e.g., the Charango Ayquileño of Ayquile, Bolivia. The number of strings on these variant instruments ranges from four to 20, and courses may be single, double, triple, or quadruple strung. (The standard charango has 10 strings in five courses of two strings each.)

Some types of charango are:

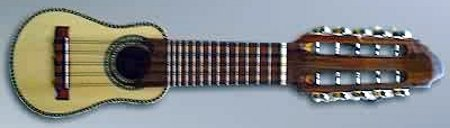
Walaycho

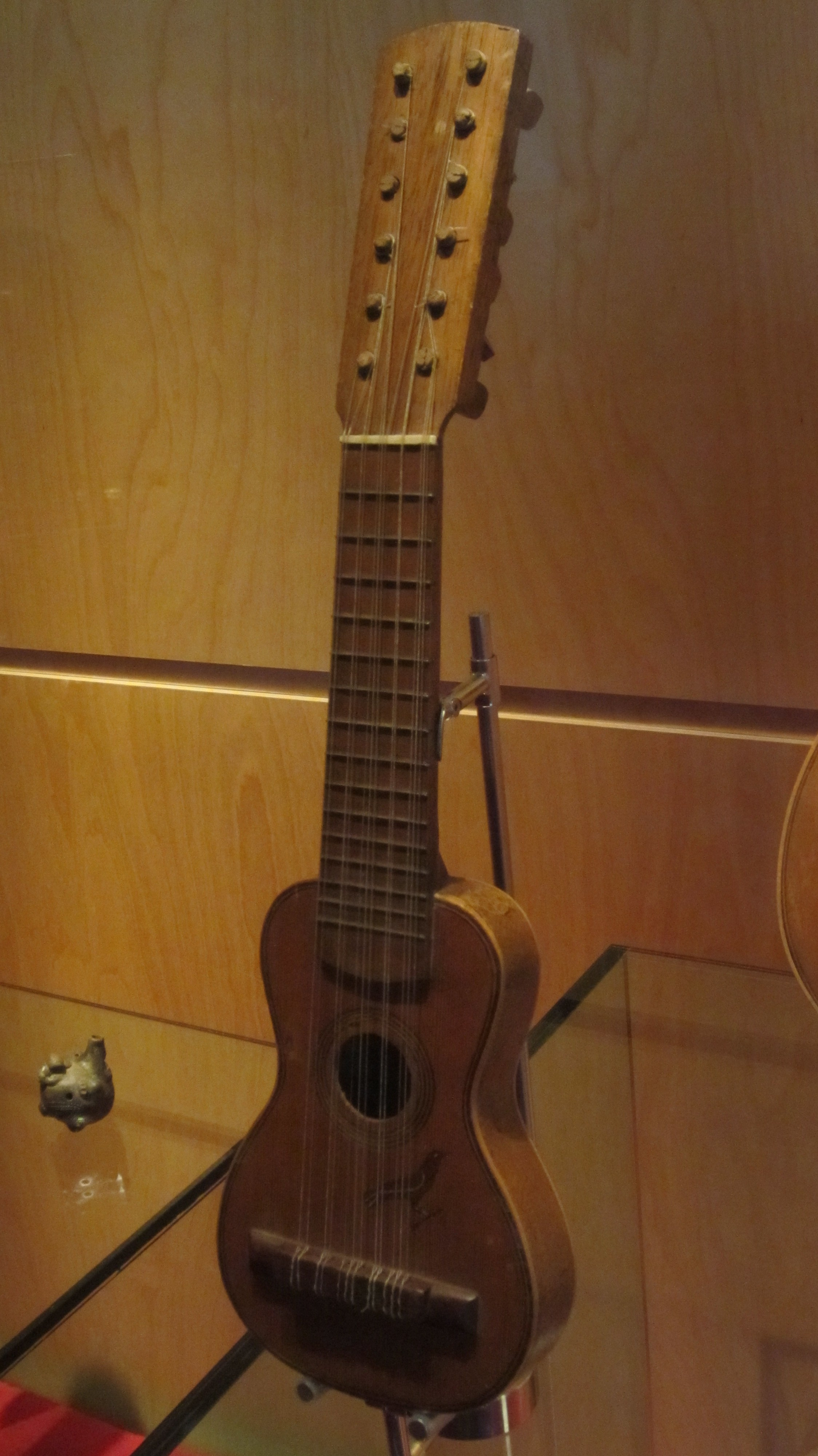
A 12-string chillador

- Walaycho (also hualaycho, maulincho, or kalampiador): a smaller relative, with a scale typically around 30 centimetres (12 in) long. It has ten strings, which may be of metal, nylon, or nylon fishing line, arranged in five courses of two strings each. Despite the short scale, the headstock must still accommodate ten tuners, which increases the total length of the instrument by nearly a third — ca. 56 centimetres (22 in) is typical. Usually tuned a fifth higher (sometimes a fourth higher) than the charango, strings in the third (center) course may be either in unison or in octaves.
- Charangón: (also charangone) a larger relative, in effect, a tenor charango. About 75 centimetres (30 in) long by 22 centimetres (8.7 in) wide with a 42–51-centimetre (17–20 in) scale. It was invented by Mauro Nuñez. Tunings vary, with the most common being a fourth lower than the charango (Argentine tuning) or a fifth lower (Bolivian tuning). It is occasionally tuned an octave lower than the charango, but such lower pitches are more usually reserved for the ronroco.
- Ronroco (also ronrroco): a still larger relative, essentially a baritone or bass charango, about 80 centimetres (31 in) long with a 46–50-centimetre (18–20 in) scale. It is a charangón named Ronroco by Gonzalo Hermosa, of the group Los Kjarkas from Cochabamba, Bolivia, in the 1980s. Ten nylon strings are arranged in five double courses. As with the charangón tunings vary, and depending on region and use the ronroco may be tuned a fourth lower than the charango (Argentine tuning); a fifth lower (Bolivia; Chile); or an octave lower ("Bolivian tuning"). The octave lower tuning is better acoustically supported by the larger body of the ronroco, and is more common on this instrument than on the charangón. The strings of the third (center) course are tuned an octave apart; strings in the other courses are usually tuned in unisons, though occasionally the fourth or fifth courses (or both) may be tuned in octaves. When courses four and five are doubled at the lower octave the ronroco is essentially no longer in reentrant tuning.
- Chillador: The name chillador can refer either to two related types of charango. The first is a standardly-tuned charango but with a body built from bent sides and a flat back like a (smaller) guitar, The second is a type that has a flat back and is usually steel-strung. It exists in both 10- and 12-string forms. When strung with ten strings in five courses it is tuned the same as a charango. With 12 strings, courses two and four are triple-strung, and the (re-entrant) tuning is more like that of a charangone or ronroco in Argentine tuning.
- The Hatun charango or "grand charango" is an extended-range charango developed in Peru in the modern era. It has either seven or eight strings, all set in single string courses except for the third course, which is double-strung. It is tuned (A3) • D4 • G4 • C5 • E5 E4 • A4 • E5

Other, less common members of the charango family include:

- Ayacucho: A small guitar-style charango (flat back) usually made of plywood, with six strings in five courses, strung 1–1–2–1–1. Smaller than the charango, but not as small as the walyacho, it is tuned like the charango, with the strings of the doubled course in octaves.
- Bajo charango: A large bass instrument, more guitar-like than charango-like, it was invented by luthier Mauro Nunez in the region of Cochabamba. It is about 1.5 metres (4 ft 11 in) long, with a scale of 87 centimetres (34 in), and the large resonating body is usually made of plywood. Six strings in five courses (1–1–2–1–1) are typically tuned: B • E • B • G • D, with the third (center) course in octaves. It sounds two octaves lower than the charango, and is written as a transposing instrument, with parts notated a 4th higher than they actually sound.
- Charango mediano or mediana ("medium" charango): a rural instrument that varies widely in size: from 50 to 95 centimetres (20 to 37 in), with scales ranging from 33 to 65 centimetres (13 to 26 in). It has ten strings in five courses, and is usually tuned an octave below the charango.
- Khonkhota (also jitarron or pomputu): A rustic instrument of the rural regions of Cochabamba, Oruro, and Potosí. Its soundbox is made of plywood, and it has only five frets. The total length is 90 centimetres (35 in), with a 65-centimetre (26 in) scale. It has eight strings in five courses (2–2–1–1–2); the doubled courses are all unison doublings. Tunings vary, with a common choice being E • A • D • B • C.
- Moquegua: Charango with 20 strings arranged in five courses of four strings each. Tuning is like the standard charango with the third (central) course using octave doublings.
- Pampeno (also Arequipeño): Another rustic, guitar-style, plywood charango used in the Arequipa region of Peru. Its 15 metal strings, triple strung in five courses, are tuned C# • F# • C# • A • E, with the third (middle) course in octaves.
- Shrieker: An instrument from the South of the Peru similar to the walaycho, made of wood or armadillo. Typically less than 30 centimetres (12 in) long, it differs from the walaycho in having 12 strings, usually metal, in five courses; the second and fourth courses are triple-strung. Tuning is the same as for the walyacho.
- Sonko: A large heart-shaped instrument with 13 (and sometimes more) strings. It is a fairly recent development, first designed in the 1970s, by Gerardo Yañez. It has not yet acquired a standard tuning.
- Vallegrandino: Named for the town of its origin, Vallegrande, Bolivia, this charango is about 50 centimetres (20 in) long, with a scale of 33 centimetres (13 in), and has six strings in four courses: 1–2–2–1. Tuning is A • E • C • G.

As one of the most popular stringed instruments in regions along the Andes, countless other regional variations of the charango exist, for example:

- charango Anzaldeño
- charango Ayquileño
- charango asimétrico
- charango diablo ("devil" charango)
- charango de juguete ("toy" charango)
- charango kirki
- charango Layme
- charango p´alta ("crushed" charango)
- charango de pukarillo ("chojllo-chojllo" charango)
- charango Sacabeño
- charango uñanchay
- guitarrilla ("chilin chilin")
- jitara
- k´ullu charango
- maulincho (tilisito)
- manguerito
- muyu muyu
- p´ala-p´ulu
- putu charango
- Soncoy charango
- tajlachi (in three sizes)

Several hybrids of charango with other instruments have also been made, for example: charanquena (charango and quena); charansicu (charango and zampoña); and charango charanguita (charango and guitar).

== Names ==
The charango is known by different names in various regions of the Andes. A few include:

- Mulita y tatu (in Argentina)
- Kirkinchu (sometimes "quirquinchu") and kirki (in Bolivia and Peru)
- Quinquela (in Bolivia)

There are also many dialect variants of these terms.

== Notable players ==
- Ernesto Cavour, Bolivian musician
- Mauro Nuñez, Bolivian musician
- Eddy Navia, Potosí, Bolivia
- Gonzalo Hermosa, Bolivian musician, Los Kjarkas co-founder, inventor of the ronroco
- Ulises Hermosa, Bolivian musician, Los Kjarkas co-founder
- Julio Lavayen, charanguista, arranger and composer; first charanguista of Los Kjarkas; Cochabamba, Bolivia
- Patricio Castillo, Chilean musician, Quilapayún member.
- Bruce Cockburn, Canadian musician, on Lily of the Midnight Sky
- Roberto Gonzalez aka "Gurrumino", Mexican musician (Raza Obrera).
- Jorge Milchberg, Argentine musician, Urubamba ("Los Incas") member
- Gustavo Santaolalla, Argentine musician (Bolivian-Ronroco specialist)
- Hector Soto, charanguista soloist, composer and teacher from Santiago de Chile
- Federico Tarazona, Peruvian musician, Interpreter
- Jaime Torres, Argentine-Bolivian interpreter, that was nominated for an Oscar
- Micah Nelson, American, Interpreter

== In popular culture ==
- It is key instrument in Andean and Latino American musical styles and core to popular music in Peru, Bolivia and Chile
- Some prominent bands and groups that feature the instrument include:
  - Los Kjarkas
  - Savia Andina
  - Luzmila Carpio
  - Grupo Aymara
  - Inti-Illimani
  - Quilapayún
  - Arak Pacha
- The charango is featured prominently in the Simon & Garfunkel hit "If I Could", which was created with new vocals layered on top of the Los Incas recording of "El Condor Pasa."
- 3000 Leagues in Search of Mother (1976), Japanese TV anime series, uses charango and quena in its opening song, Sougen no Marco (Japanese: 草原のマルコ).
- Ólöf Arnalds, Icelandic folk singer, plays the charango extensively on her debut album Við og Við. Ólöf also plays charango on two tracks on Skúli Sverrisson's Sería album: Sungio E.g. Gaeti and Sería.
- Yehuda Glantz, Jewish-Latin musician, frequently performs with a charango. On the live album Granite he informs his audience that he plays a charango from his native Argentina.
- Monsieur Periné, a Colombian group, features charango in many of their songs, mixing Colombian folk rhythms with gypsy jazz.
- Morcheeba, an electronica group, has an album entitled Charango, which includes a song called Charango, featuring rapper, Pace Won.
- Andrew Reissiger of the world music group Dromedary features the charango on many songs. Reissiger has used the instrument in both the Americana/Folk tradition via Jonathan Byrd's The Sea and The Sky and on a Puerto Rican CD with Roy Brown, Tito Auger, and Tao Rodriguez-Seeger titled Que Vaya Bien.
- Gustavo Santaolalla, composer for several popular films (including Babel, 21 Grams & The Motorcycle Diaries) makes extensive use of the Charango and Ronroco in many of his compositions, and his album Ronroco (1998) highlights that instrument.
- Blanco White, an English singer-songwriter, plays charango in several of his songs, most notably the song Olalla on his 2020 album On The Other Side.
- Eclectic Charango Beats a band formed in Brooklyn by Latin American Musicians, incorporates the sound of the charango over cumbia and psychedelic rock textures.
- Young the Giant prominently feature the instrument on their 2018 song "Superposition".

== See also ==
- List of string instruments
