= Jonathan Byrd (musician) =

American singer-songwriter

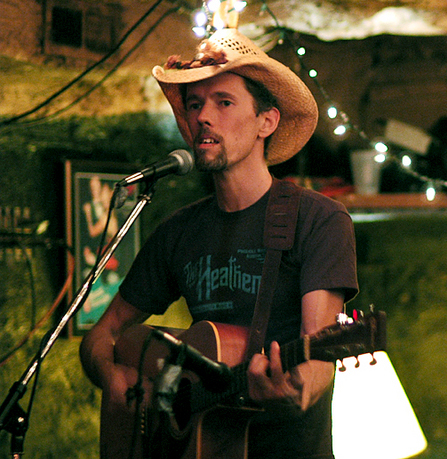

Background information
- Born: Jonathan Byrd; 1970 (age 55–56); Fayetteville, North Carolina, U.S.
- Origin: Carrboro, North Carolina
- Genres: country, folk singer-songwriter world, folk-rock
- Instruments: vocals, guitar
- Years active: 2000–present
- Label: Waterbug Records
- Website: www.jonathanbyrd.com

Jonathan Byrd (born 1970 in Fayetteville, North Carolina) is an American singer-songwriter based in Carrboro, North Carolina. He is best known for his narrative tales of love, life, and death in America. In 2003, he was among the winners of the New Folk competition at the Kerrville Folk Festival. He set a record for CD sales at the festival that year, making more sales than the main stage acts. His song, "The Ballad of Larry" has been listed a "Top Rated Song" by Americana-UK. He primarily performs solo and accompanies himself in a variety of traditional acoustic guitar styles. His recordings have featured a variety of instrumental ensembles and typically include one or more instrumental tracks that feature Byrd's skillful flatpicking technique. Occasionally he also appears with the Athens, Georgia-based world music duo, Dromedary.

Byrd teamed up with Chris Kokesh after meeting her at the Americana Song Academy and the duo released a self-titled album under the name The Barn Birds in 2013.

In 2014, Byrd released You Can't Outrun The Radio, a collection of songs inspired by an impromptu song circle in 2009 at the Green Room in Montreal.

== Discography ==
=== Albums ===
- Wildflowers (2001, Waterbug Records)
- The Waitress (2002, Waterbug Records)
- The Sea and The Sky, with Dromedary (2004, Waterbug Records)
- This Is The New That (March 2007, Waterbug Records)
- Radio Soul, with Diana Jones (May 2007)
- The Law and the Lonesome (May 2008, Waterbug Records)
- Cackalack (November 2010, Waterbug Records)
- The Barn Birds (July 2013, Waterbug Records)
- You Can't Outrun The Radio (November 2014, Waterbug Records)
- Mother Tongue, with The Sentimentals (February 2015)
- Jonathan Byrd & The Pickup Cowboys (November 2018)

=== Other recordings ===
- "You Better Keep An Eye On Him", with Dromedary on Vote in November: Election 2004 Anti-Theft Device (Waterbug compilation, 2004)
- "Breathless" on Waterbug Anthology 8: Born into the Whisper (Waterbug compilation, 2006)
- Live at the Saxon Pub, with Greg Klyma (download of live show, 2006)
- "Cut 'em Down", a song by Byrd, recorded by Mission Street Project for Liberty Tree: Songs from the American Kitchen, Vol. 1 (2006, Hudson Harding)
- "White Cloud", a song by Byrd recorded by Karen Mal for The Space Between (2007, Waterbug); Mal and Byrd also co-wrote the album's title track.
