= Andrew Calhoun =

American singer-songwriter

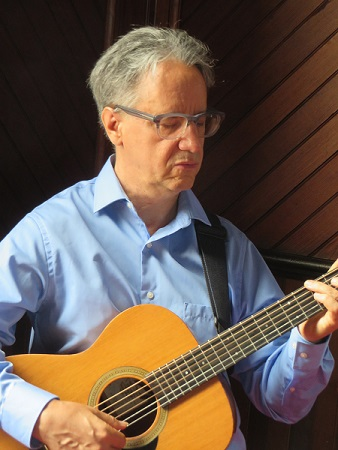
- Andrew Calhoun in 2016

Background information
- Born: November 30, 1957; New Haven, Connecticut, United States
- Genres: Folk; Americana
- Occupations: Musician; songwriter; author
- Instruments: Vocals; guitar
- Labels: Flying Fish; Waterbug
- Formerly of: Andrew & Casey Calhoun
- Website: http://www.andrewcalhoun.com/

Andrew Calhoun (born November 30, 1957, in New Haven, Connecticut, United States) is an American folk singer-songwriter based in the Chicago area.

== Career ==
Calhoun was inspired to become a musician when his mother introduced him to some of her high school students who played guitar. Early influences include Kris Kristofferson, Johnny Cash, Leonard Cohen, Edna St. Vincent Millay, Joseph Conrad, C.S. Lewis and Mississippi John Hurt.

In 1992, he founded the artists cooperative record label Waterbug Records, stating "Waterbug is largely an artists' co-op. All the artists own their recordings and publishing rights. We are working cooperatively to help each other get heard."

Calhoun's performances include works by various songwriters and poets, Anglo-Scottish ballads in original translations from dialect, African American spirituals, and his own varied songbook. He is working on a Robert Burns songbook which will challenge several decisions on tune sources and variants accepted by scholarship since James Dick's work in 1903. He performs solo and in a duo with his daughter, Casey Calhoun, who sings.

In 2012, Calhoun received the Lantern Bearer Award for 25 years of service to the folk arts by the Folk Alliance Regional Midwest. In 2014, he received a Lifetime Achievement Award from the Woodstock Folk Festival.

== Discography ==
- Water Street (1983, Hogeye Records LP – out of print)
- Gates of Love (1984, [Flying Fish Records LP – out of print)
- Walk Me to the War (1987, Flying Fish LP – out of print)
- Banks of Sweet Primroses, (1990, self-release cassette of folk, Renaissance and Baroque guitar instrumentals)
- Jack Spratt, (1991, self-released cassette album in duo with Kat Eggleston)
- First Comes Love, (1992, self-released cassette album in duo with Kat Eggleston, with Andrew Bird, violin)
- Hope (1993, Waterbug)
- Phoenix Envy (1996, Waterbug)
- Where Blue Meets Blue (1999, Waterbug)
- Tiger Tattoo (2003, Waterbug)
- Telfer's Cows: Folk Ballads of Scotland (2004, Waterbug)
- Shadow of a Wing (2004, Waterbug)
- Staring at the Sun (Songs 1973–1981) (2005, Waterbug)
- Bound To Go: African-American Spirituals and Secular Folk Songs (2008, Waterbug)
- Grapevine (2011, Waterbug)
- Living Room (2013, Waterbug)
- Rhymer's Tower: Ballads of the Anglo-Scottish Border (2017, Waterbug)
- Skeins: Andrew and Casey Calhoun (2018, Waterbug)

== Bibliography ==
- Twenty-Four Poems (1989, Psychological Bagpipes Press)
- Hay (2004, The Paper Airplane Press)
- The Trilogy Trilogy (2012, Waterbug, humor book)
- Warlock Rhymer: An English Translation of Robert Burns' Scots Poems (2017, Artemis Press)
