= Waterbug Records =

Waterbug Records is a small independent record label based in Glen Ellyn, Illinois specializing in singer-songwriters and traditional folk musicians who do original research. The label was founded as an artist cooperative label in 1992 by singer-songwriter Andrew Calhoun. Calhoun described the label in a column written for Sing Out!: "Waterbug is largely an artists' co-op. All the artists own their recordings and publishing rights. Twenty artists contributed a song and part of the cost of manufacturing a label sampler, which each of us sell from the stage for $5. We are working cooperatively to help each other get heard."

== Roster ==
- Geoff Bartley
- Randy Black
- Chuck Brodsky
- Jonathan Byrd
- Andrew Calhoun
- Lui Collins
- Erin Corday
- Kat Eggleston
- Bob Franke
- Annie Gallup
- Michael Jerling
- Jenn Lindsay
- Kate MacLeod
- Kate McDonnell
- Sarah McQuaid
- Anaïs Mitchell
- William Pint and Felicia Dale
- Shinobu Sato
- Danny Schmidt
- Cosy Sheridan
- Devon Sproule
- Sons of the Never Wrong
- Art Thieme
- Sloan Wainwright
- Dar Williams
- Hugh Blumenfeld

== See also ==
- List of record labels
