= Bolivians =

People identified with the country of Bolivia

Bolivians Bolivianos
- Bolivians on the world map

Total population
- c. 13.2 million Diaspora 1.4 million

Regions with significant populations
- Bolivia 11 million
- Argentina: ~1 to 2 million
- Brazil: 350,000-600,000
- Spain: 179,571–239,000
- Chile: 180,266 (2023)
- United States: 99,296
- France: 25,000
- Italy: 12,924
- Japan: 7,103
- Sweden: 5,632
- Austria: 1,000
- Australia: 956

Languages
- Primarily Spanish; Quechua, Aymara, Guarani and other languages of Bolivia

Religion
- Predominantly Roman Catholic (syncretism with traditional beliefs is widely practiced); Protestant and Mormon minorities

Bolivians (Spanish: Bolivianos) are people identified with the country of Bolivia. This connection may be residential, legal, historical or cultural. For most Bolivians, several (or all) of these connections exist and are collectively the source of their being Bolivian.

Bolivia is, as its neighboring countries, a multiethnic and multilingual society, home to people of various ethnic, religious, and national origins, with the majority of the population made up of indigenous and Old World immigrants and their descendants. As a result, Bolivians do not equate their nationality with ethnicity, but with citizenship and allegiance to Bolivia. Aside from the indigenous populations, Bolivians trace their ancestry to the Old World, primarily Europe and Africa, ever since the Spanish conquest of the Inca Empire and founding of first Spanish settlements in Tupiza and La Plata.

Modern Bolivian population, estimated at 11 million is formally broken down into Amerindians (primarily Quechua and Aymara, Guaraní peoples), Mestizos, Europeans and Afro-Bolivians. The group's sole common language is Spanish (Bolivian Spanish), although the Guarani, Aymara and Quechua languages are also widely spoken in their communities and to some degree by others, and all three, as well as 34 other indigenous languages, are official languages of the country. The mutual influence and interaction of cultures of Bolivia have resulted in modern Bolivian society becoming one of prime examples of a melting pot according to some anthropologists.

== Ethnic groups ==
Ethnic composition
Indigenous-Native peoples self-identification
Indigenous self-identification	40.6 %
None self-identification	59.4 %
Ethnic self-identification
Mestizo	68 %
Indigenous	20 %
White Bolivian	5 %
Cholo	2 %
Afro-Bolivian	1 %
Other	1 %
n/a	3 %

The ethnic composition of Bolivia includes a great diversity of cultures. Most of the indigenous peoples have assimilated a mestizo culture, diversifying and expanding their indigenous heritage; as such, many people of exclusively Amerindian ancestry may simply identify as "Mestizo". Consequently, there is in Bolivia a mix of cultures, which joins together Hispanic and Amerindian cultures.

=== Mestizo Bolivians ===
Mestizos are people of mixed European and indigenous ancestry. They are distributed throughout the entire country and compose about 68% of the Bolivian population. Most people assume their mestizo identity while at the same time identifying themselves with one or more Indigenous cultures. Genetic research indicates that the ancestry of Bolivian mestizos is predominantly indigenous.

=== Indigenous Bolivians ===
Indigenous, also called "originarios" ("native" or "original") and, less frequently, Amerindians. This ethnic group is composed by the descendants of the Pre-Hispanic cultures. They can be Andean, as the Aymaras and Quechuas (which formed the ancient Inca Empire), which concentrate in the western departments of La Paz, Potosí, Oruro, Cochabamba and Chuquisaca. There also is an important oriental ethnic population, composed by the Chiquitano, Guaraní and Moxos, among others, and that inhabit the departments of Santa Cruz, Beni, Tarija and Pando. According to the most recent census, the indigenous people compose 20% of the Bolivian population, but in reality, this number is likely much higher.

=== White or European Bolivians ===
Modern estimates determine that White Bolivians (European descent) now represent between 5% and 15% of the population. However, according to a 2014 survey by Ipsos, 3% of people questioned said they were white. In the 1900 census, White Bolivians composed 12.72% or 231,088 (115,139 men, 115,949 women) of the total population and the last official census to collected data on all racial origins. Most people who identify as white are descendants of criollos and European immigrants, coming mostly from Spain, Croatia, Germany and Italy. They are usually concentrated in the largest cities — La Paz, Santa Cruz de la Sierra, Cochabamba and Tarija (being the department where the eurodescendants predominate by density but not by quantity). In the Santa Cruz Department there is an important colony (70.000 inhabitants) of German-speaking Mennonites.

=== Afro-Bolivians ===
Afro-Bolivians are descendants of African slaves, who arrived in the times of the Spanish Empire. They inhabit the department of La Paz and in the provinces of Nor Yungas and Sud Yungas. 23,330 people self-identified as Afro-Bolivian in the 2012 census.

=== Other ===
- Asians: Mainly Japanese (14,000) and Lebanese (12,900).
- Other: There are small amounts of European citizens of Germany, France, Italy and Portugal, as well as coming from other countries of the Americas, as Argentina, Brazil, Chile, Colombia, Cuba, Ecuador, United States, Paraguay, Peru, Mexico and Venezuela, among others. There are important Peruvian colonies in La Paz, El Alto and Santa Cruz de la Sierra. Bolivia is home to about 500 Jews, located mainly in the cities of La Paz, Cochabamba and Santa Cruz de la Sierra.

==== Indigenous peoples ====
The Indigenous peoples of Bolivia are divided into two ethnic groups: the Andeans, who are in the Andean Altiplano and the valley region, and the ethnic culture of the oriental Llanos region, who inhabit the warm regions of eastern Bolivia (Gran Chaco).

- Andean ethnicities
  - Aymaras. They live on the high plateau of the departments of La Paz, Oruro and Potosí, as well as some small regions near the tropical flatlands.
  - Quechuas. They inhabit mostly the valleys on Cochabamba and Chuquisaca. They also inhabit some mountain regions in Potosí and Oruro. They divide themselves into quechua nations, as the Tarabucos, Ucumaris, Chalchas, Chaquies, Yralipes, Tirinas, among others.
- Ethnicities of the Oriental Llanos
  - Guaraníes. Formed by Guarayos, Pausernas, Sirionos, Chiriguanos, Wichí, Chulipis, Tapietes, Tobas and Yuquis.
  - Tacanas: Formed by Tacanas, Lecos, Ese Ejas, Araonas, Reyesanos and Maropas.
  - Panos: Formed by Chacobos, Caripunas, Sinabos, Capuibos and Guacanaguas.
  - Aruacos: Formed by Apolistas, Baures, Moxos, Chané, Movimas, Cayabayas, Carabecas, Paiconecas or Paucanacas.
  - Chapacuras: Formed by Itenez or More, Chapacuras, Sansinonianos, Canichanas, Itonamas, Yuracares, Guatoses and Chiquitos.
  - Botocudos: Formed by Bororos y Otuquis.
  - Zamucos: Formed by Ayoreos.

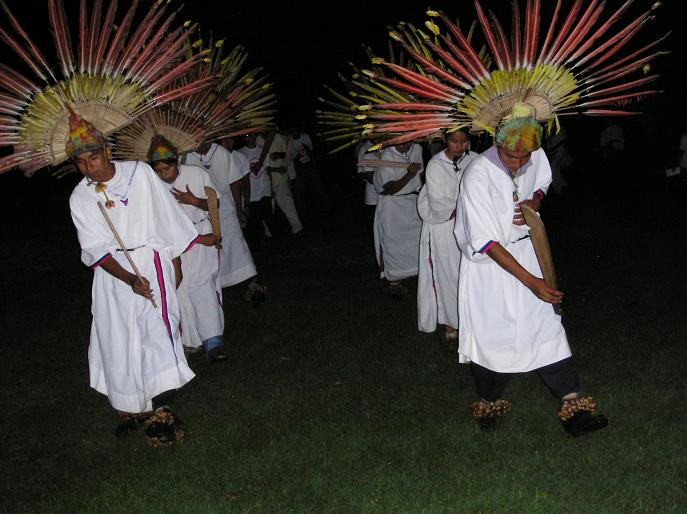
Macheteros

Main Indigenous and Afro-Bolivian peoples from Bolivia
N°	Group	Population	%	N°	Group	Population	%
1	Quechua	1,837,105	18.26%	6	Guarayo	23,910	0.24%
2	Aymara	1,598,807	15.89%	7	Afro-Bolivian	23,330	0.23%
3	Chiquitano	145,653	1.45%	8	Movima	18,879	0.19%
4	Guaraní	96,842	0.96%	9	Tacana	18,535	0.18%
5	Mojeño	42,093	0.42%	10	Tsimane Chimán	16,958	0.17%
Source: 2012 Census of Bolivia

== Religion ==
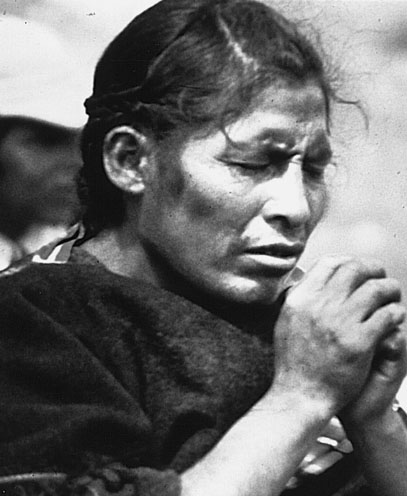
Aymara woman praying

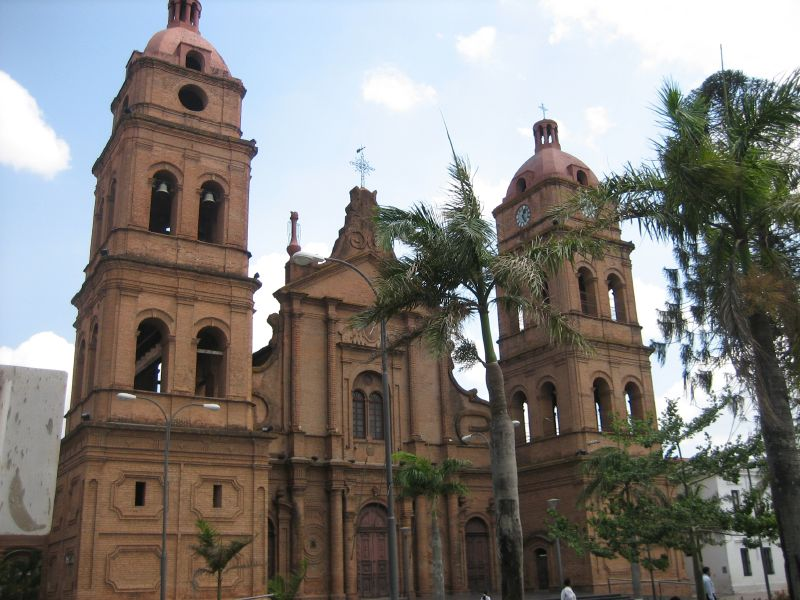
Basílica Menor de San Lorenzo, in Santa Cruz, Bolivia

The Roman Catholic church has a dominant religious presence in Bolivia. While a vast majority of Bolivians are Catholic Christians, a much smaller portion of the population participates actively. In the decades following the Second Vatican Council (1962–65), the Church tried to make religion a more active force in social life.

A 2008 survey for Americas Barometer, with 3,003 respondents and an error (+/- 1,8%) returned these results:

Religion	Percentage	Notes
Catholic	81.6%	
Evangelical	10.3%	Pentecostal, Non-Catholic Charismatic
No religion	3.3%	Secular, Atheist
Other Protestant	2.6%	Historic Protestant: Adventist, Baptist, Calvinist, Salvation Army, Lutheran, Methodist, Nazarene, Presbyterian
Mormon and Jehova's Witness	1.7%	
Non-Christian	0.4%	Baháʼí Faith, Jewish, Muslim, Buddhist, Hindu
Traditional religions	0.1%	Native religions

Other reviews of the population vary from these specific results.

== Culture ==
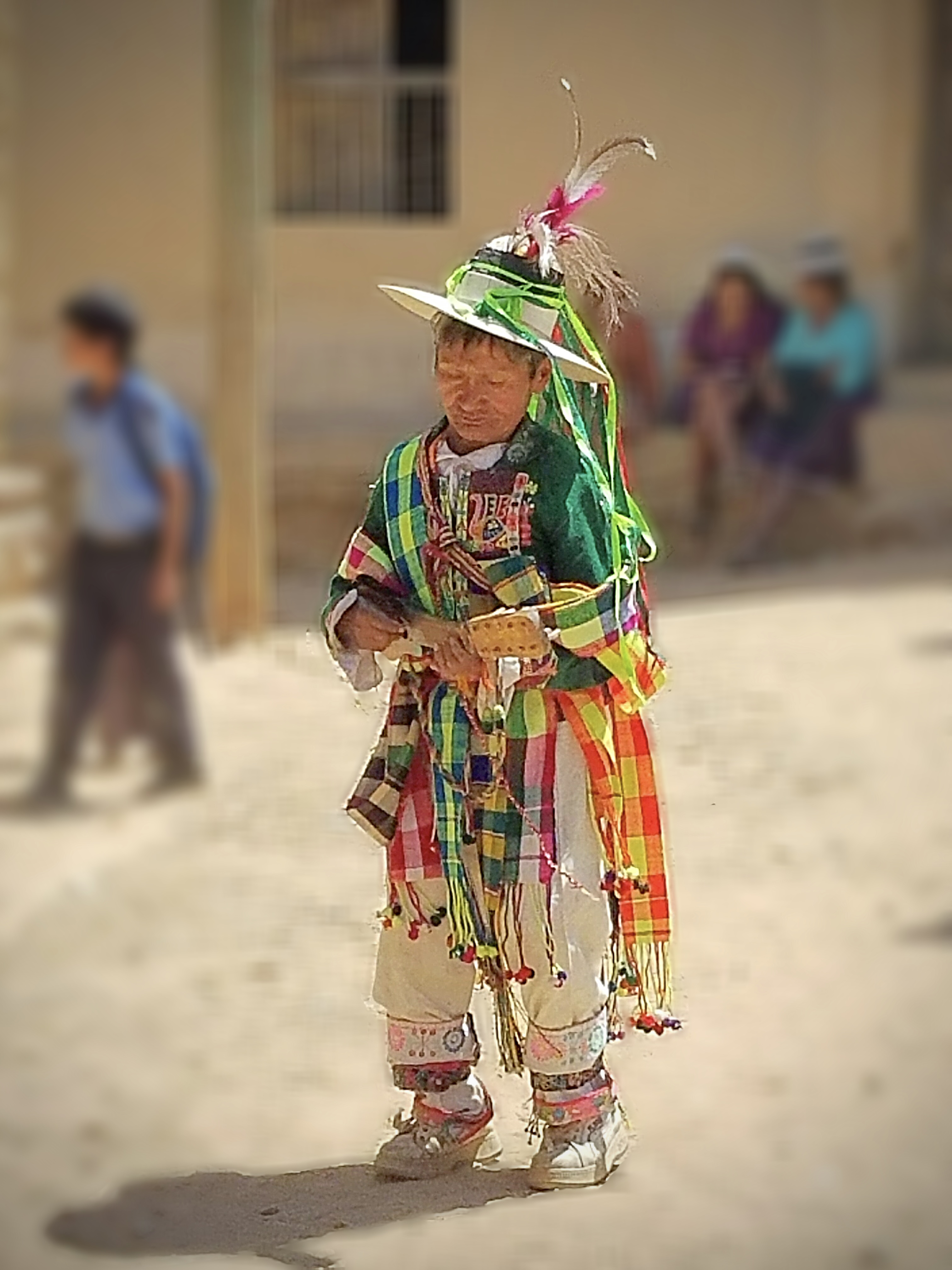
One of the typical traditional clothing of Potosí (Bolivian andes).

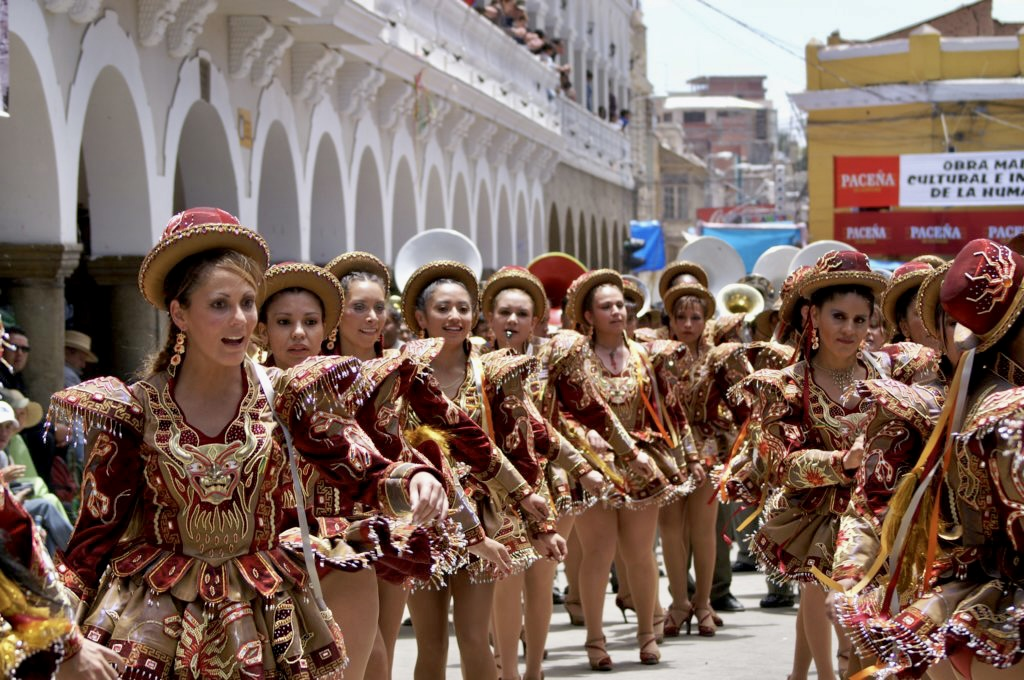
Carnival of Oruro

Some cultural development of what is now Bolivia is divided into three distinct periods: pre-Columbian, colonial, and republican. Important archaeological ruins, gold and silver ornaments, stone monuments, ceramics, and weavings remain from several important pre-Columbian cultures. Major ruins include Tiwanaku, Samaipata, Inkallaqta and Iskanwaya. The country abounds in other sites that are difficult to reach and hardly explored by archaeologists.

The Spanish brought their own tradition of religious art which, in the hands of local indigenous and mestizo builders and artisans, developed into a rich and distinctive style of architecture, literature, and sculpture known as "Mestizo Baroque." The colonial period produced the paintings of Perez de Holguin, Flores, Bitti, and others, and also the works of skilled but unknown stonecutters, woodcarvers, goldsmiths, and silversmiths. An important body of native baroque religious music of the colonial period was recovered in recent years and has been performed internationally to wide acclaim since 1994. Bolivian artists of stature in the 20th century include, among others, Guzman de Rojas, Arturo Borda, María Luisa Pacheco, Master William Vega, Alfredo Da Silva, and Marina Núñez del Prado.

=== Dances ===
Many dances and songs contain elements from both the native and European cultures. Caporales seems to be the most popular Bolivian dance of present times — in a few decades it has developed into an enormously popular dance, not only in the Highlands where it originated, but also in the Lowlands and in Bolivian communities outside the country. In the Highlands, other traditional and still very popular dances are:

- Morenada
- Kullawada
- Diablada
- Ch'utas
- Waka waka
- Siklla (Wayra, Doctorcitos)
- Suri Sikuri
- Tinku
- Pukllay
- Tobas
- Awki awki
- Llamerada
- Cambitas
- Chacarera
- Afro-Bolivian Saya

In the Lowlands, there are:

- Macheteros
- Taquirari
- Chovena chiquitana
- Brincao
- Carnavalito
- El Sarao
- Los moperas
- La Paica
- Danzas del Sol y de la Luna
- Danza de la Saraza
- Danzas de los pescadores
- Danzas del cazador amazónico
- Danza Rosita Pochi
- Arete guazú
- Toritos
- Danzas Vallegrandinas de Santa Cruz
- Cueca Cruceña
- Caporales

=== Clothing ===
It is fashionable among Bolivian Andean women of indigenous descent to wear a ski. It was originally a Spanish peasant skirt that the colonial authorities forced indigenous women to wear. Now it is a symbol of pride in being indigenous and is considered a status symbol.

Another fashion is the bowler hat, which was adopted from the British. The position of the hat can indicate a woman's marital status and aspirations.

=== Cuisine ===
Bolivian cuisine stems mainly from the combination of Spanish cuisine with traditional indigenous Bolivian ingredients, with later influences from Argentines, Germans, Italians, Basques, Croats, Russians, and Poles, due to the arrival of immigrants from those countries.

The traditional staples of Bolivian cuisine are corn and potatoes. These ingredients have been combined with a number of staples brought by the Spanish, such as rice, wheat, and meat, such as beef, pork, and chicken

== See also ==
- Demographics of Bolivia
- Health in Bolivia
- Hispanics
- Peruvians
- Inca Empire
- Bolivian Americans
- Amerindians
