= Culture of Bolivia =

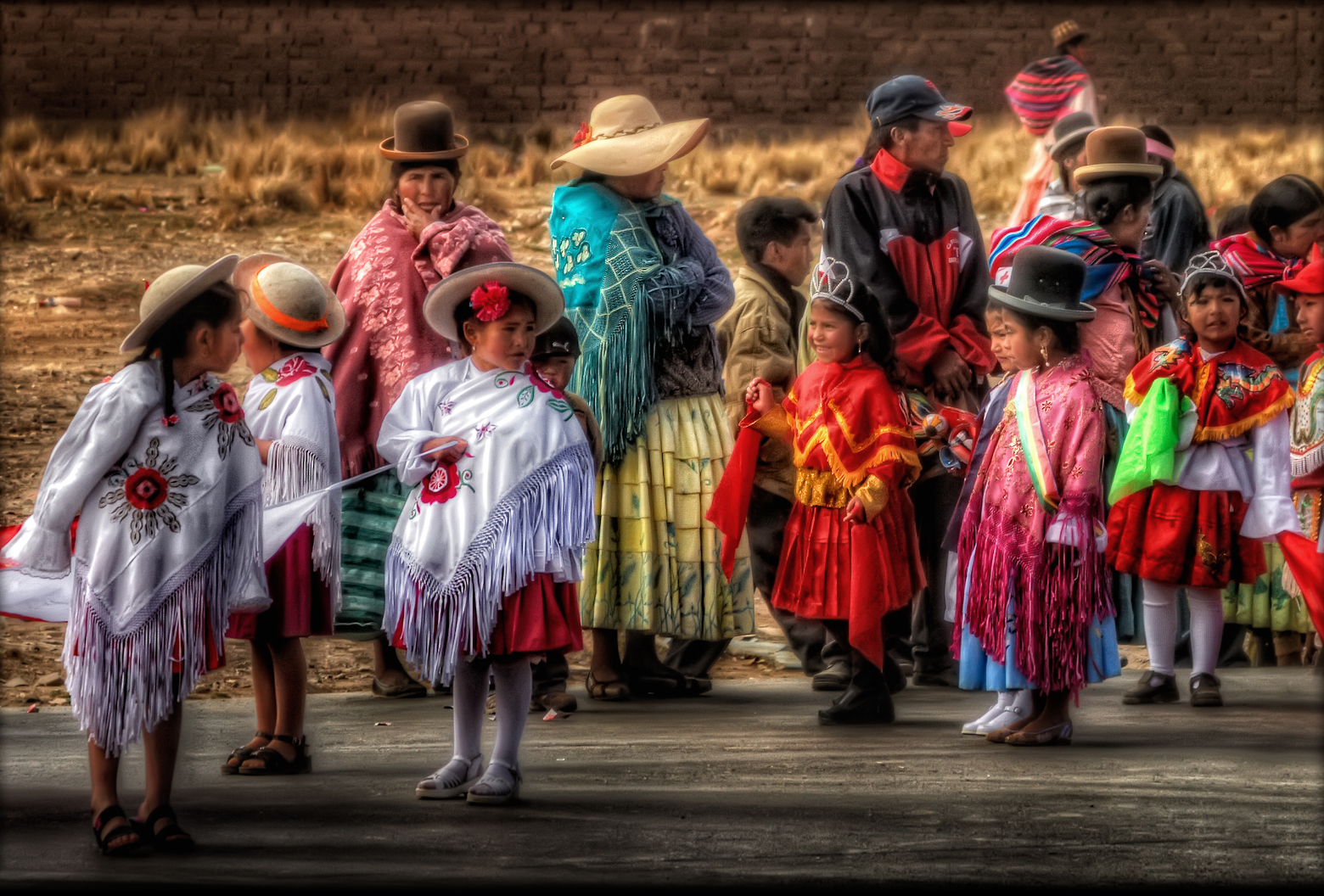
Traditional folk dress during a festival in Bolivia.

Bolivia is a country in South America, bordered by Brazil to the north and east, Paraguay and Argentina to the south, Chile to the west, and Peru to the west.

The cultural development of what is now Bolivia is divided into three distinct periods: pre-Columbian, colonial, and republican. Important archaeological ruins, gold and silver ornaments, stone monuments, ceramics, and weavings remain from several important pre-Columbian cultures. Major ruins include Tiwanaku, Samaipata, Inkallaqta and Iskanwaya. The country abounds in other sites that are difficult to reach and hardly explored by archaeologists.

The Spanish brought their own tradition of religious art which, in the hands of local indigenous and mestizo builders and artisans, developed into a rich and distinctive style of architecture, literature, and sculpture known as "Mestizo Baroque." The colonial period produced not only the paintings of Perez de Holguin, Flores, Bitti, and others, but also the works of skilled but unknown stonecutters, woodcarvers, goldsmiths, and silversmiths. An important body of native baroque religious music of the colonial period was recovered in recent years and has been performed internationally to wide acclaim since 1994. Bolivian artists of stature in the 20th century include, among others, Guzman de Rojas, Arturo Borda, María Luisa Pacheco, Master William Vega, Alfredo Da Silva, and Marina Núñez del Prado.

== Festivals ==
Pagan rites from the pre-Columbian era are still common during the religious festivals of indigenous Bolivians. The clothing used during the festivals is reminiscent of the dress of pre-Columbian indigenous peoples and 16th century Spaniards. The annual carnival of Oruro is among the great folkloric events of South America, as are the lesser known indigenous Anata Andina and the "carnival" at Tarabuco (Pujllay), or the Tinku - fertility rites held at Macha every 3 May. They also celebrate Dia de los Muertos.

== Dances ==
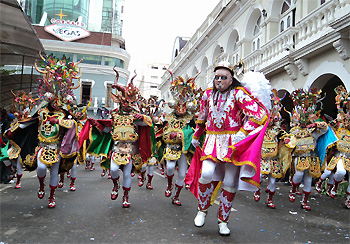
The Diablada dance primeval, typical and main of Carnival of Oruro a Masterpiece of the Oral and Intangible Heritage of Humanity since 2001 in Bolivia (Image: Fraternidad Artística y Cultural "La Diablada").

Many dances and songs contain elements from both the native and European cultures. Caporales seems to be the most popular Bolivian dance of present times – in a few decades it has developed into an enormously popular dance, not only in the Highlands where it originated, but also in the Lowlands and in Bolivian communities outside the country. In the Highlands, other traditional and still very popular dances are:

- Awki awki
- Cambitas
- Ch'utas
- Diablada
- Kullawada
- Llamerada
- Morenada
- Pukllay
- Afro-Bolivian Saya
- Siklla (Wayra, Doctorcitos)
- Suri Sikuri
- Tango
- Tinku
- Tobas
- Waka Waka

In the Lowlands, there are:

- Macheteros
- Taquirari
- Chovena

== Clothing ==
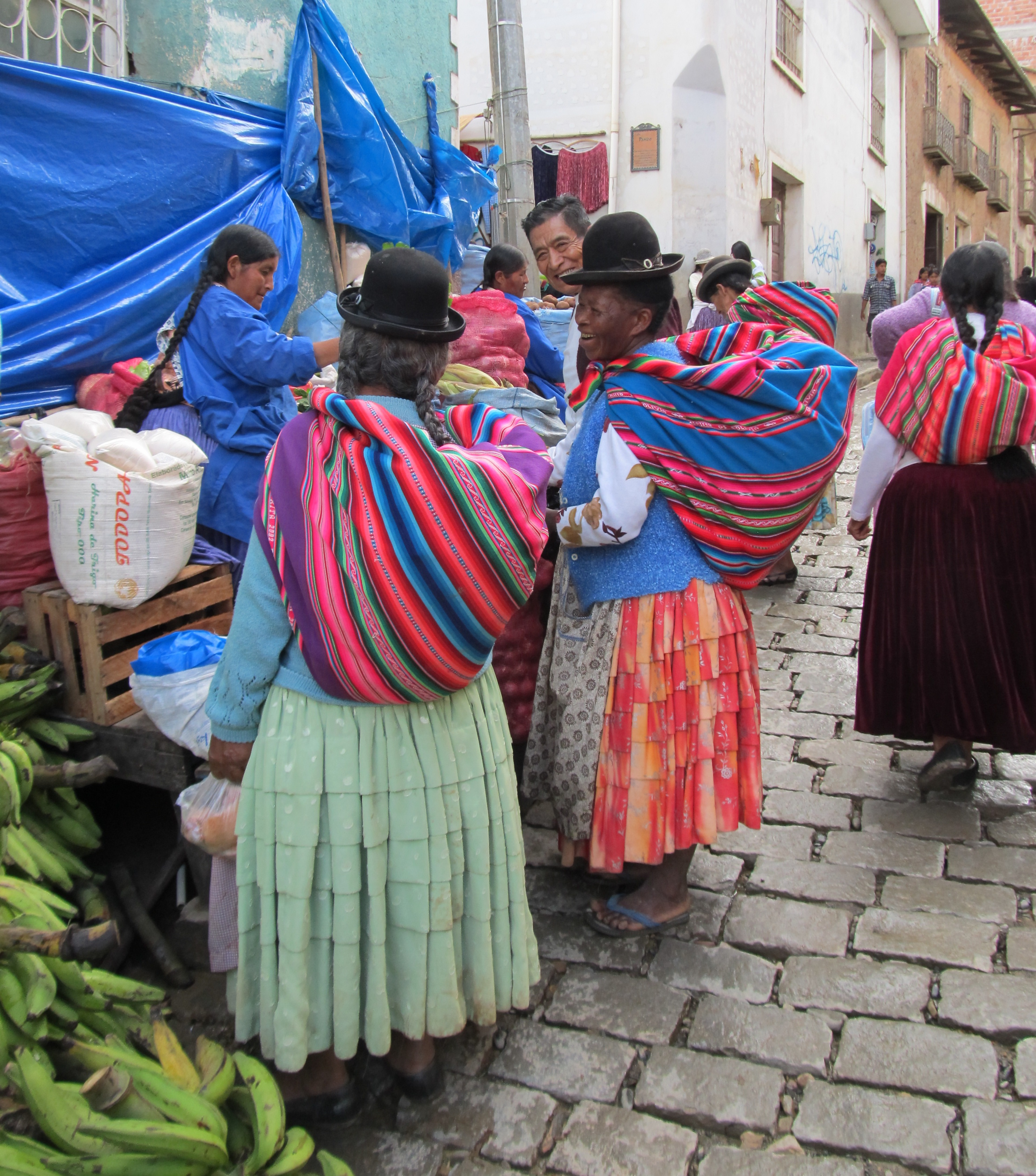
An Afro-Bolivian woman in Coroico.

Clothing of Andean people of indigenous descent includes the pollera (pleated-skirt), the 19th century European bowler hat, and a silky shawl known as a manta. This style of dress is often referred to as "de pollera" (of the pollera) and the women who wear it are called "mujeres de pollera". The pollera was originally a simple Spanish dress that colonial authorities forced the indigenous populations to wear. While sometimes the source of discrimination, the pollera is a symbol of pride for the indigenous people, who live in La Paz, and for people in rural areas.

For indigenous men in the highlands, the poncho is the quintessential clothing piece. Both men and women stereotypically wear sandals.

Non-indigenous people in the highlands, as well as the inhabitants of Santa Cruz de la Sierra in the lowlands, from babies to seniors, wear the same types of globalized clothing styles that are typical in western countries. These include denim jeans, shorts (common because of the heat in the lowlands), t-shirts, dresses, etc.

== Sports ==
Association football is the most popular sport in Bolivia. The governing body of football in Bolivia is the Federación Boliviana de Fútbol (FBF), which controls the national teams. The FBF organises the men's, women's, and futsal national teams.

The Bolivia national football team is currently ranked 75th in the world, with their best FIFA ranking being 18th in the world. The national team has competed at the FIFA World Cup three times, the Copa América 23 times, and the Confederations Cup once.

La Paz has the highest tournament-class golf course in the world.

Bolivia's national basketball team finished 8th at the 2016 South American Basketball Championship. There, Bolivia beat Ecuador 75-74 for its first victory ever at the event. Bolivia's women's national basketball team won the silver medal at the 1978 South American Basketball Championship for Women.

=== Stadiums in Bolivia ===
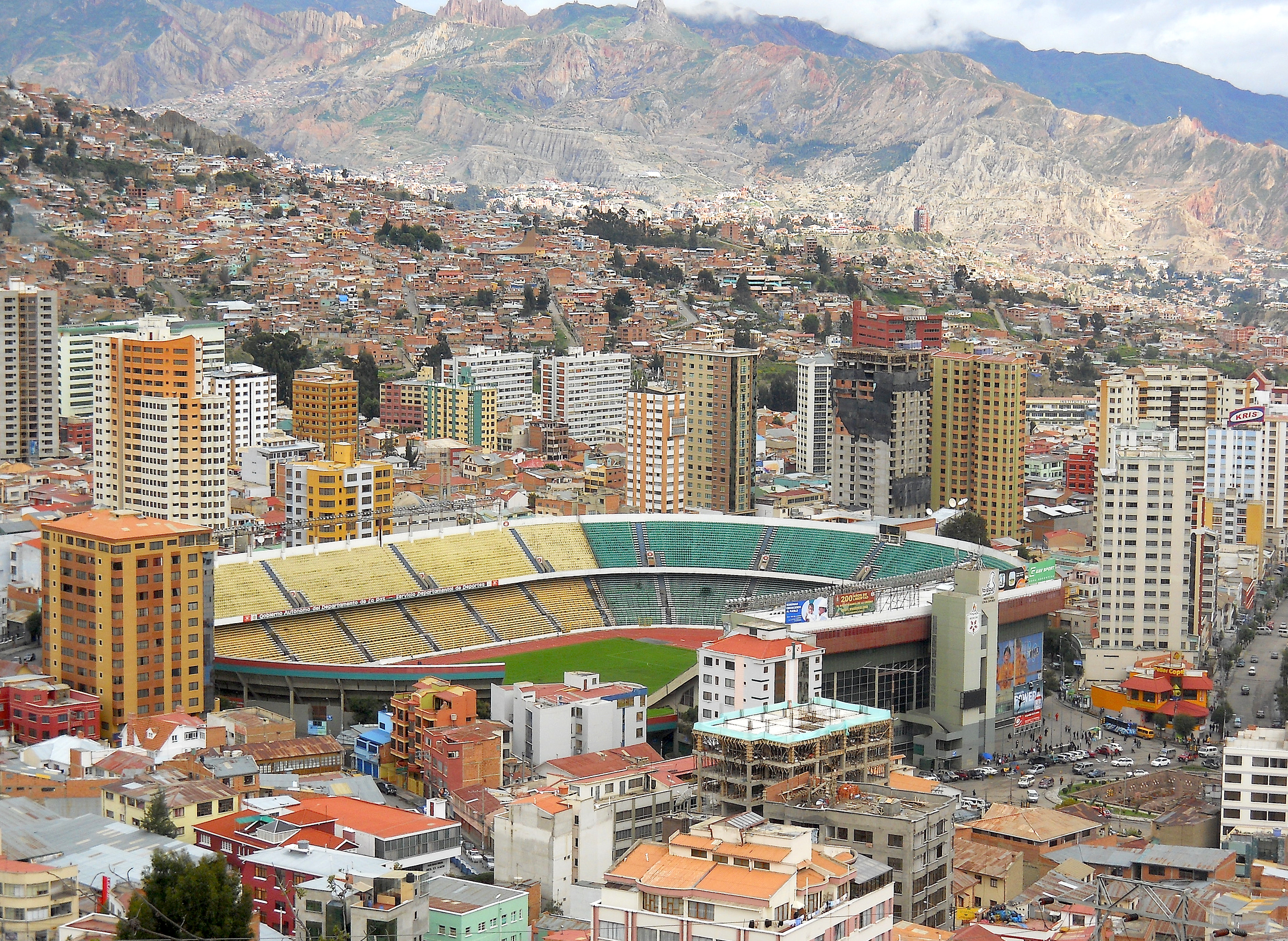
Estadio Hernando Siles

For football stadiums in Bolivia, see List of football stadiums in Bolivia. Indoor stadiums in Bolivia can be found in the table below.

Rank	Venue	Date built	Capacity	City	Image
1	Polideportivo Evo Morales	2015	12,000	Quillacollo	
2	Coliseo Julio Borelli Viterito	1977	10,000	La Paz	
3	Polideportivo Garcilazo	2009	10,000	Sucre	
4	Polideportivo Héroes de Octubre	2013	10,000	El Alto	
5	Coliseo Eduardo Leclere Polo	2000	10,000	Oruro	

== Cuisine ==
Bolivian cuisine stems mainly from the combination of Spanish cuisine with traditional native Bolivian ingredients, with later influences from Germans, Italians, Basques, Croats, Russians, and Poles, due to the arrival of immigrants from those countries. The three traditional staples of Bolivian cuisine are maize, potatoes, and beans. These ingredients have been combined with a number of staples brought by the Europeans, such as rice, wheat, and meat, such as beef, pork, and chicken.

Bolivia is particularly known for a type of empanada known as the salteña.

== Music ==
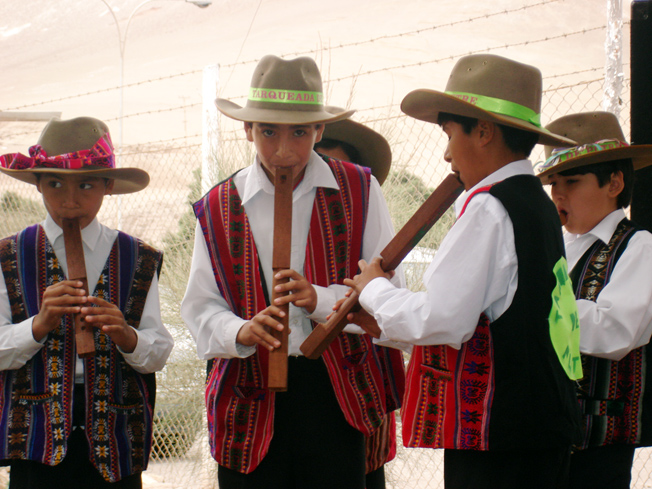
Bolivian children playing the tarka.

Bolivia's regional folk music is distinctive and varied. In the Andean regions, music is played during the festivals and dances. Some tunes contain strong Spanish influences.

The most common musical instruments are:

- Sicu (also sicus)
- Tarka or tharqa
- Pinkillo
- Skin drums
- Copper bells
- Wood
- Guitar
- Flute
- Zampoña
- Matraca
- Mandolina
- Charango
- Quena

== See also ==
- Architecture of Bolivia
- Andean culture
- Hispanic culture
- Latin American culture
- Performing Life, Inc, NGO
- Lists of stadiums
