= Carnaval de Oruro =

Religious festival in Oruro, Bolivia

Oruro Carnival
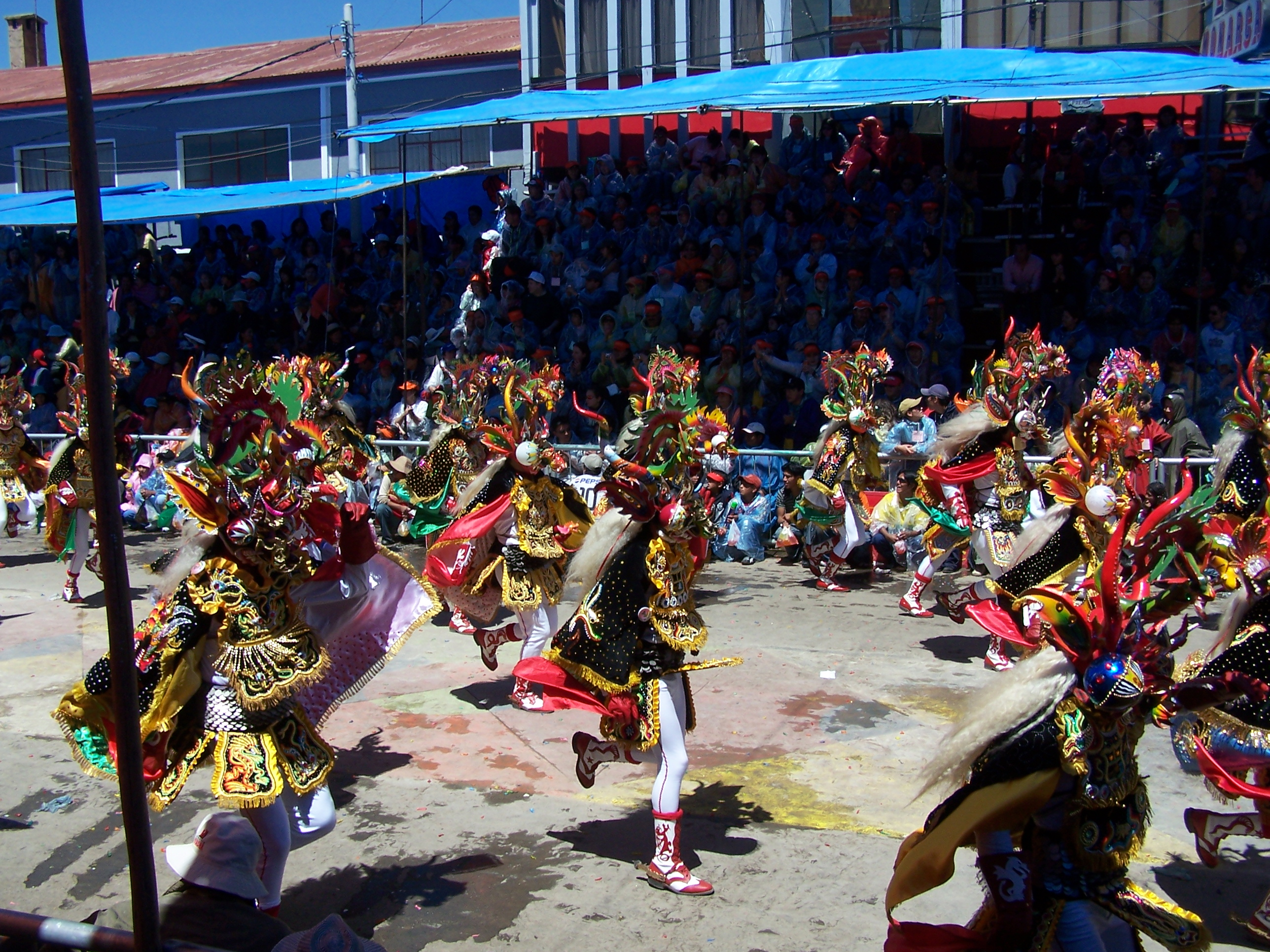
- Diablada dance at the Oruro Carnival 2007
- Type: cultural, religious, Christian
- Significance: Celebration prior to fasting season of Lent.
- Celebrations: Parades, parties, open-air performances
- Begins: Friday before Ash Wednesday (55 days to Easter)
- Ends: Ash Wednesday noon (46 days before Easter)
- 2025 date: Afternoon, February 24 – midday, March 5
- 2026 date: Afternoon, February 9 – midday, February 18
- 2027 date: Afternoon, February 1 – midday, February 10
- 2028 date: Afternoon, February 21 – midday, March 1
- Duration: 10 days
- Frequency: annual
- Related to: Fiesta de La Candelaria, Carnival, Ash Wednesday, Lent

Carnival of Oruro
- UNESCO Intangible Cultural Heritage
- Country: Bolivia
- Reference: 00003
- Region: Latin America and the Caribbean

Inscription history
- Inscription: 2008 (3rd session)
- List: Representative

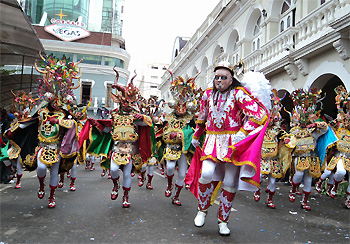
The Diablada, dance primeval, typical and main of Carnival of Oruro a Masterpiece of the Oral and Intangible Heritage of Humanity since 2001 in Bolivia (Image: Fraternidad Artística y Cultural "La Diablada".

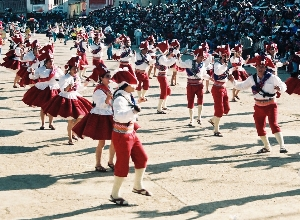
Llamerada Dancers in the Carnival

The Carnival of Oruro is a religious and cultural festival in Oruro, Bolivia. Originally an indigenous festival, the celebration later was transformed to incorporate a Christian ritual around the Virgin of Socavón. The carnival is one of UNESCO's Masterpieces of the Oral and Intangible Heritage of Humanity.

Throughout the festival, more than 48 groups of folk dancers specializing in 18 different folk dances perform a pilgrimage to the Shrine of the Tunnel every Saturday of the carnival in a traditional parade. The traditional Llama llama or Diablada became the leading traditional dance of the festival.

== Background ==
The native Itu ceremonies were banned by the Spanish in the 17th century, during their rule over Upper Peru. However, the Uru continued to observe the festival in the form of a Catholic ritual on Candlemas, in the first week of each February. Christian icons were used to conceal portrayals of Andean gods, and the Christian saints stood in for other minor Andean divinities. The ceremony began forty days before Easter.

Legend also has it that in 1756, a mural of the Virgin Mary miraculously appeared in a mineshaft of the richest silver mine in Oruro. Ever since the Carnival has been observed in honor of the Virgen de la Candelaria (Virgin of the Candlemas) or Virgen del Socavon (Virgin of the Mineshaft). The most important elements of the Carnival now occur in and around the Santuario del Socavon (Church of the Mineshaft).

=== Pre-Hispanic period ===
Called Jururu (Uru Uru) in ancient times, the area that is now Oruro was a religious pilgrimage center of the Andean world. Pilgrims would trek to the "Sacred Mountain of the Urus", where they could call protective deities: wak'as, achachilas and apus. These deities included Jamp'atu Qullu (hill toad), Argentillo Arankani (hill lizard), Quwak (viper), the condor and Wakallusta, among others. After the Incan Empire expanded to the region, the culture expanded as well. This could be understood through the addition of an evil demigod, WariDesam, and a sacred demigod, Apus waka.

Spanish colonization led to the breaking down of the indigenous native legacies. However, many indigenous rites were preserved by the inhabitants, giving rise to a religious syncretism of Catholicism and Wari Culture. Christian ideas of the Virgin and the Devil from Catholic teachings were absorbed into native ideas of Pachamama and Tio Supay, a blending of religious symbolism that can still be seen during the Carnival.

=== Modern carnival ===
The modern festival demonstrates the ongoing pagan-Catholic blend of religious practice in the region. The carnival starts with a ceremony dedicated to the Virgen del Socavon. Marching bands compete simultaneously in the grotto of Pie de Gallo on Sunday, which is the greeting to the Virgin. The highlight of the festival is the three-day-and-three-night parade of 48 groups of folk dancers over a four-kilometer route to the sanctuary of the tunnel. Three days prior to this Saturday pilgrimage, people visit the symbolic pagan condor. A week after the pilgrimage, they visit the snake south of the city, the toad to the north, and the ants to the east.

Pilgrimage culminates in enacting two medieval-style mystery plays. The first is about the Spanish conquest and the other revolves around the classical battle between good and evil, with the Archangel Michael ultimately triumphing over the Devil and the Seven Deadly Sins. The last play was introduced by Catholic clergy in 1818.

In all, there are over 28,000 dancers, about 10,000 musicians in 150 bands, and 400,000 visitors stretching over four miles. The bands themselves have a national festival on the Monday before Carnival weekend, that is aired on Bolivian television and is attended by the President of Bolivia and government authorities.

== UNESCO designation ==
An international jury of public figures chaired by writer Juan Goitisilo and convened by UNESCO proclaimed the Carnival one of the Masterpieces of the Oral and Intangible Heritage of Humanity on May 18, 2001. The proclamation was broadcast from Paris, France. Other members of the jury included the President of the Republic of Mali, Alpha Oumar Konare, the Kabaka of Uganda, His Majesty Ronald Muwenda Mutebi il, Princess Basma Bint Talal of Jordan, the Bolivian singer Zulma Yugar and Mexican writer Carlos Fuentes.

== Dance Specialties ==
Oruro's historical importance, as well as its cultural and religious influence, make its carnival a natural setting for demonstrating the multiculturalism of Bolivia and especially its variety of folk dances. The dance groups participating represent various indigenous dance styles, and are accompanied by several bands. Areas represented by the dancers include:

- The Andean region of the Bolivian Altiplano and the Yungas valleys: Groups include the negritos, Afro-Bolivian saya and the Euro-Bolivian caporales. This area is densely populated, including the departments of Potosí, Oruro and part of La Paz. This area is rich in folklore, with dances including the tinku, llamerada (llameros), kullawada, kallawaya, the siklla (wayra, doctorcitos), Inkas and kantu.
- Valleys area: Cochabamba, Tarija and Chuquisaca, including the potolos and pukllay dances.
- The plains and forests: departments of Santa Cruz, Beni, Pando, Tarija and Chuquisaca featuring multi-ethnic war dances.
- All the dances share Oruro origin like the dance of the devils or diablada, morenada, antawara, awatiri, suri sikuri, wititi, intillaqta, tarqueadas and sampoñaris.

- Diablada
- Morenada
- Tobas
- Caporales
- Tinku
- Inkas
- Llamerada
- Kullawada
- Suri Sikuri
- Antawara
- Awatiri
- Zampoñeros
- Tarqueadas
- Kantus
- Kallawaya
- Wititi
- Potolos
- Siklla
- Waka waka
- Pujllay

== Image Gallery ==
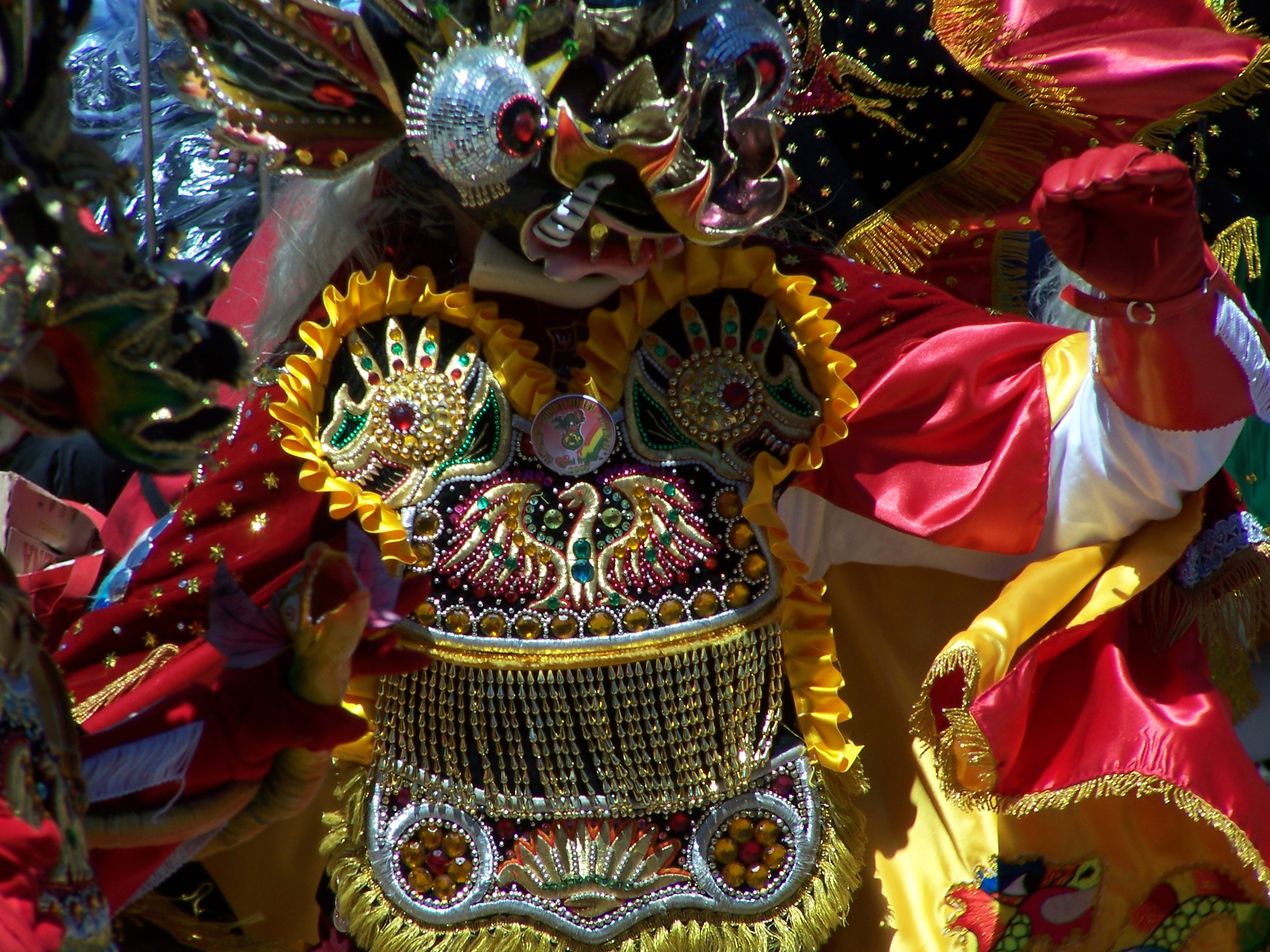
Detail of Diablada's costume

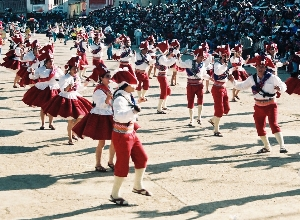
Dancers of the Llamerada in Carnaval de Oruro of 1993

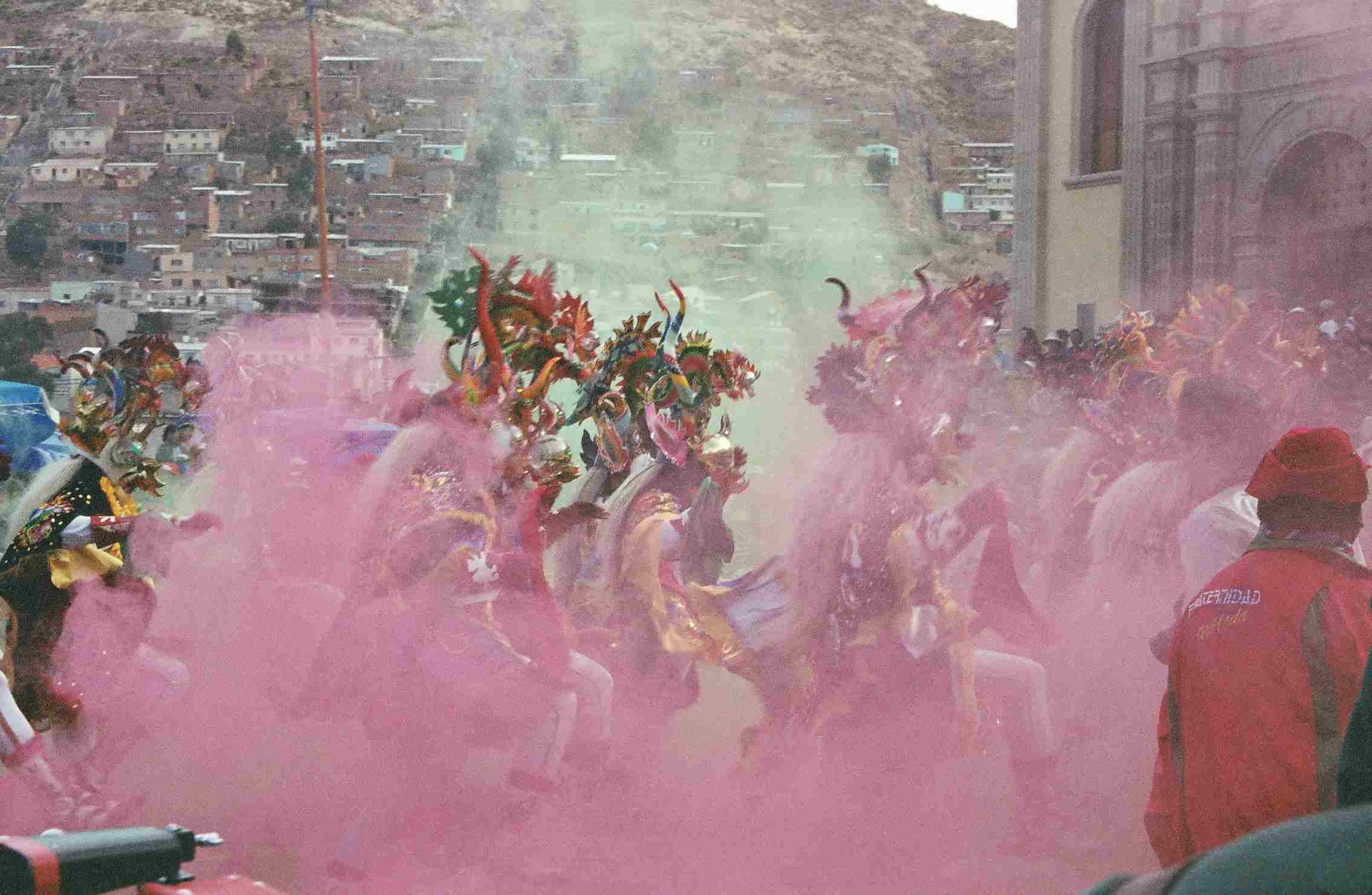
Ensemble of Diablada dance at the 2005 Carnaval de Oruro

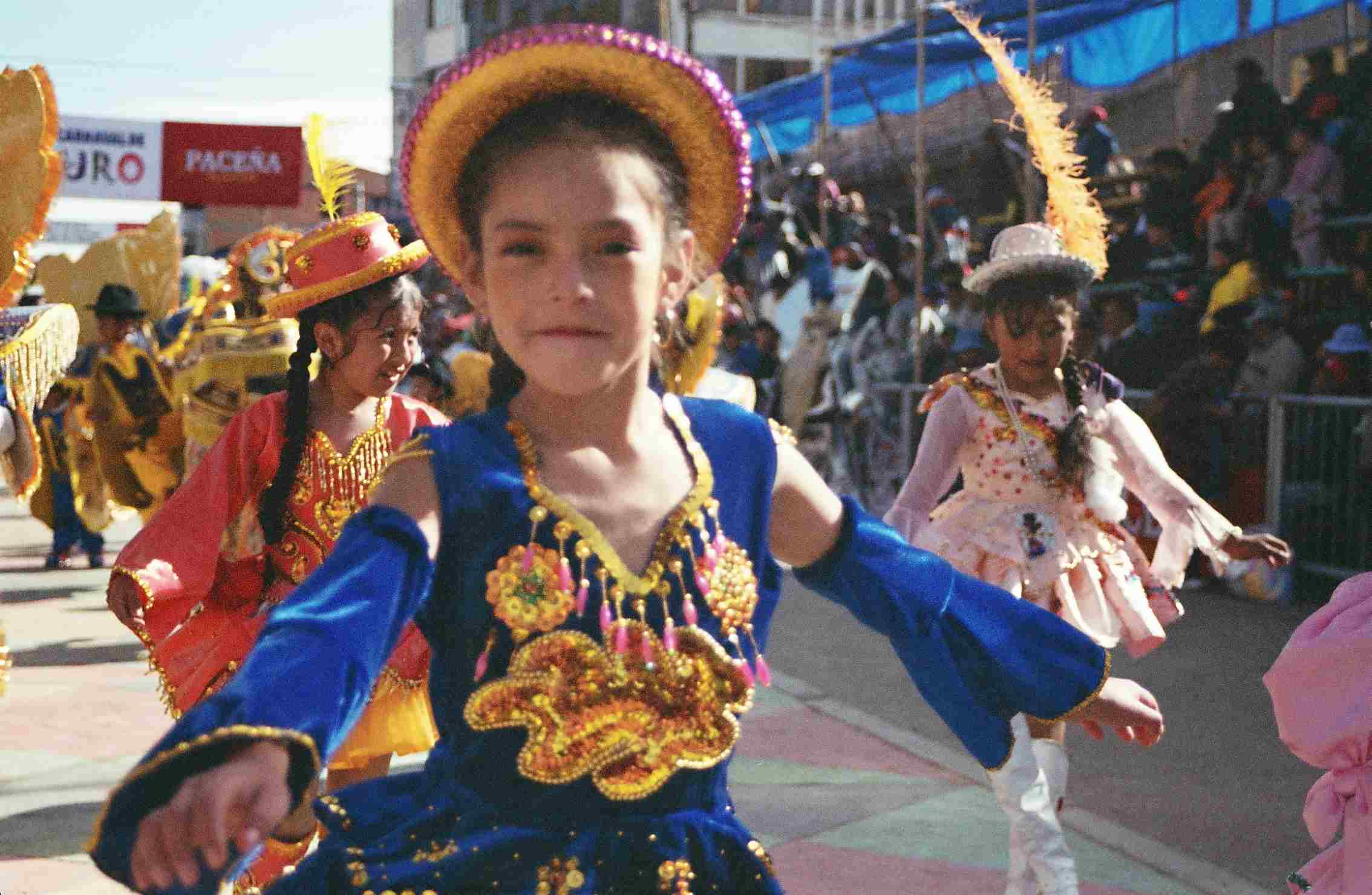
Kids dancing Morenada in the 2005 Carnaval de Oruro

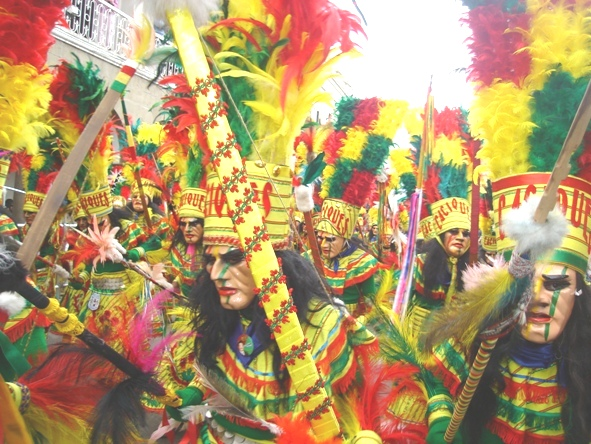
Tobas dancers at the 2008 Carnaval de Oruro

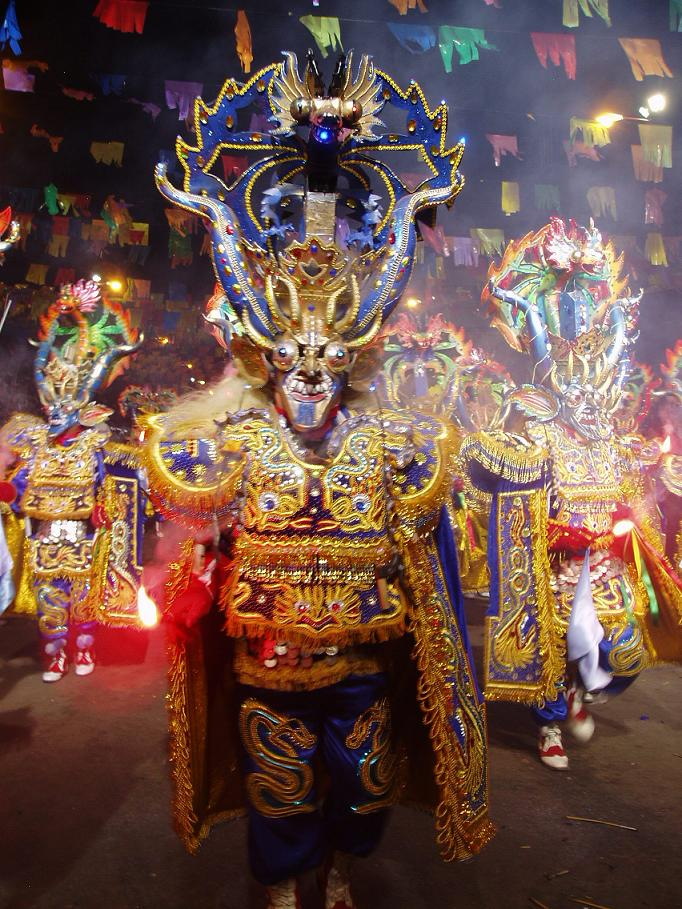
Luciferes, Diablada Artística Urus at the 2009 Carnaval de Oruro

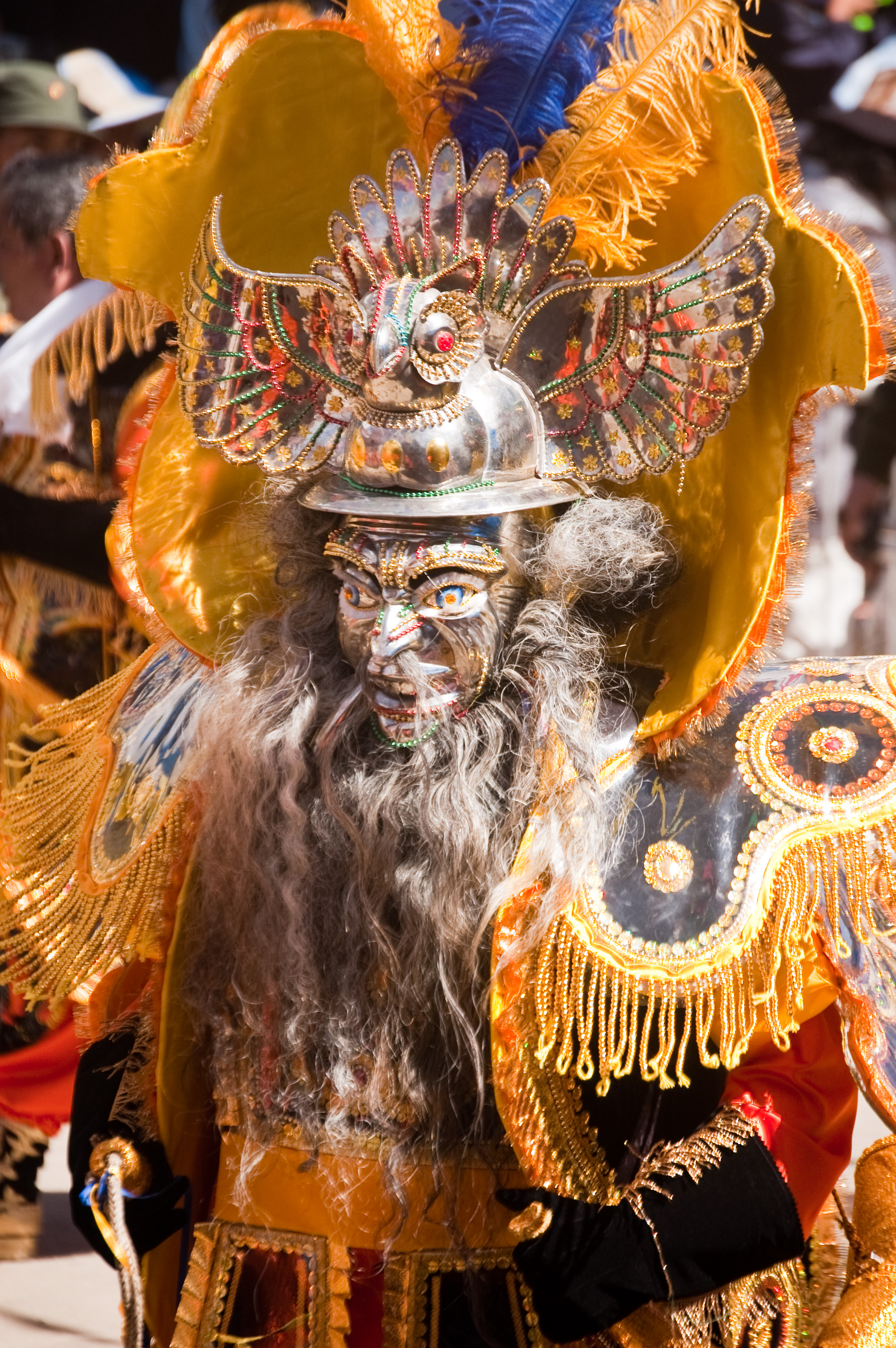
Caporal of Morenada, Carnaval de Oruro of 2009

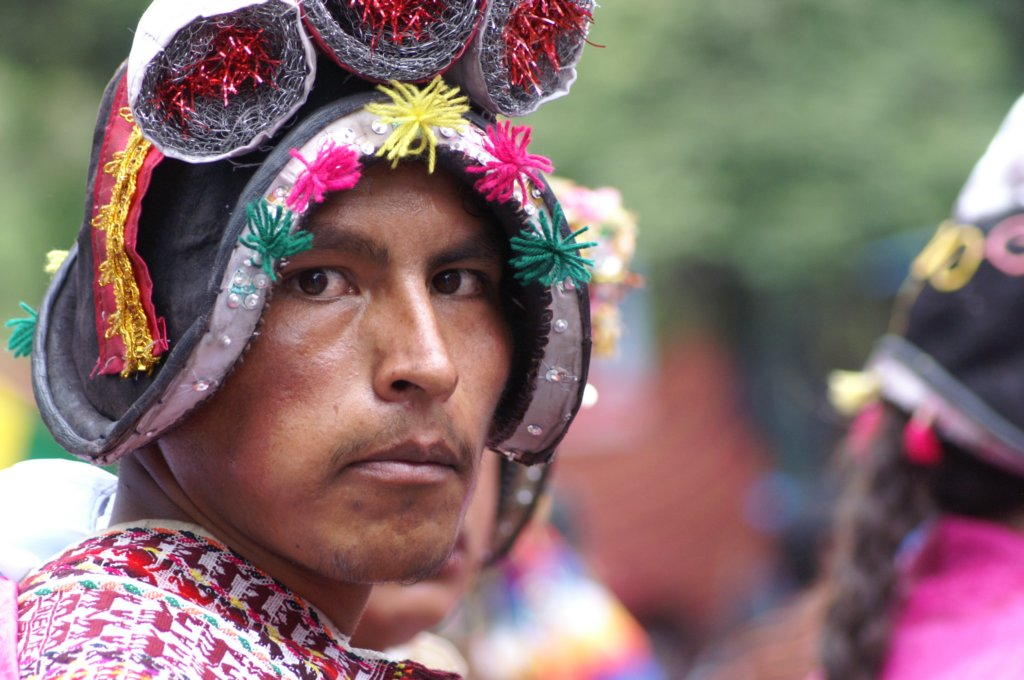
Pujllay dancer at the 2010 Oruro Carnival

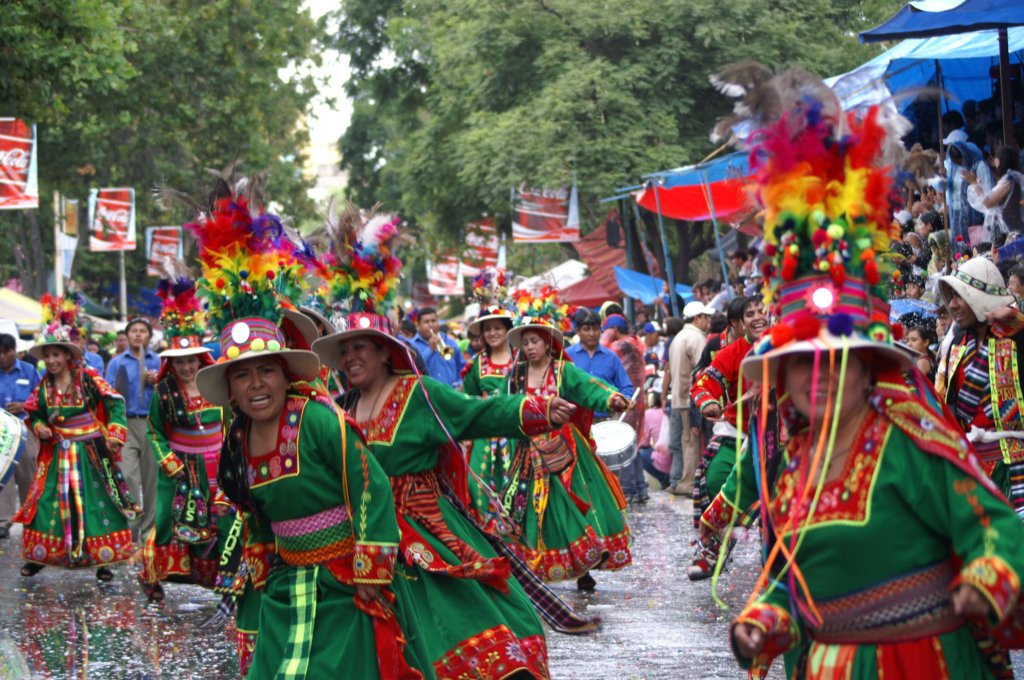
Tinkus dance at the 2010 Carnaval de Oruro

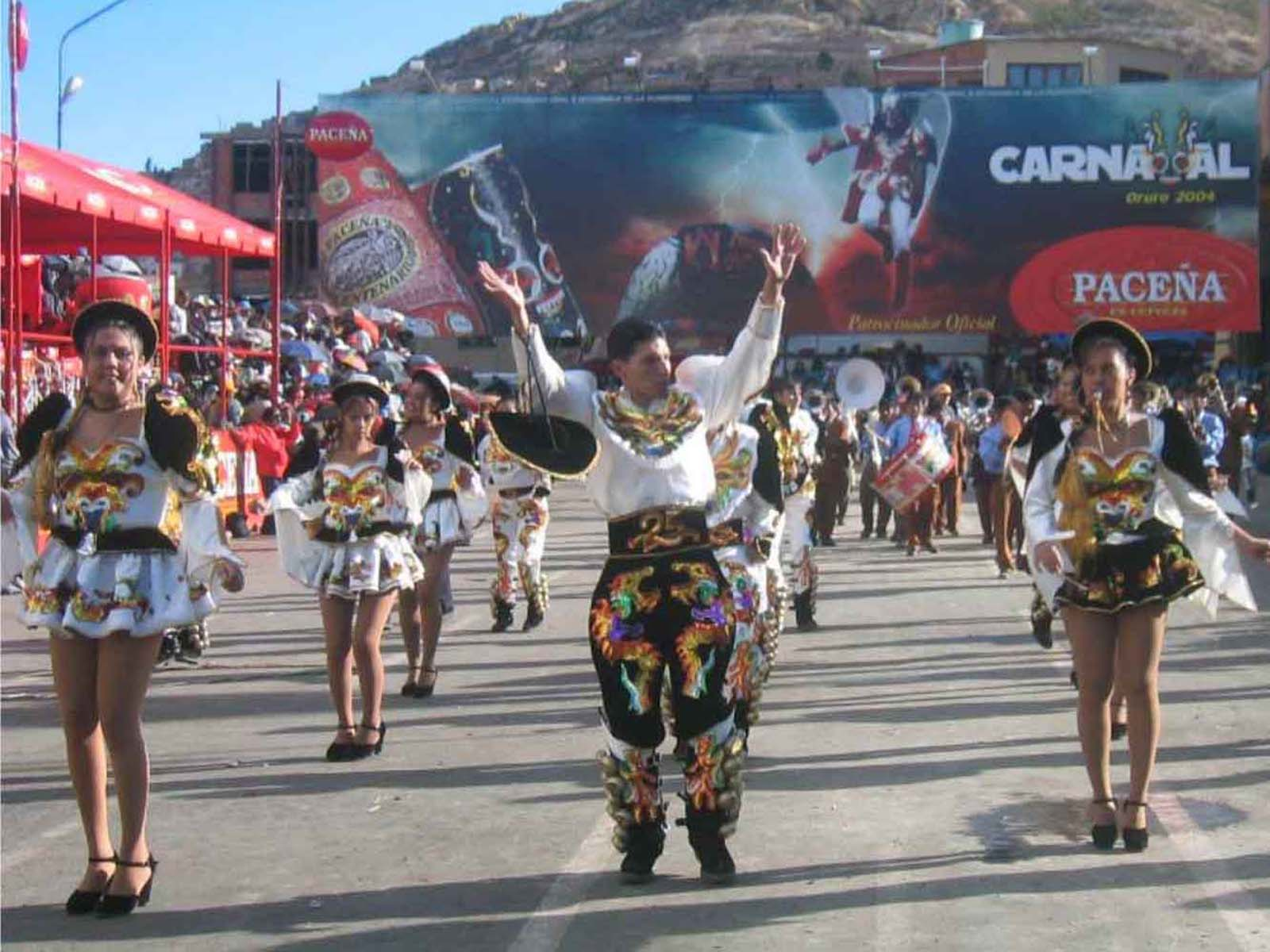
Caporales dancers at the 2010 Carnaval de Oruro

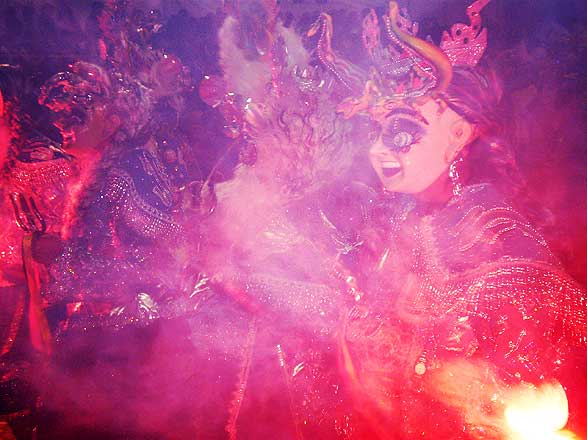
China Supay dancing in the Diablada Artistica Urus at the 2011 Carnaval de Oruro

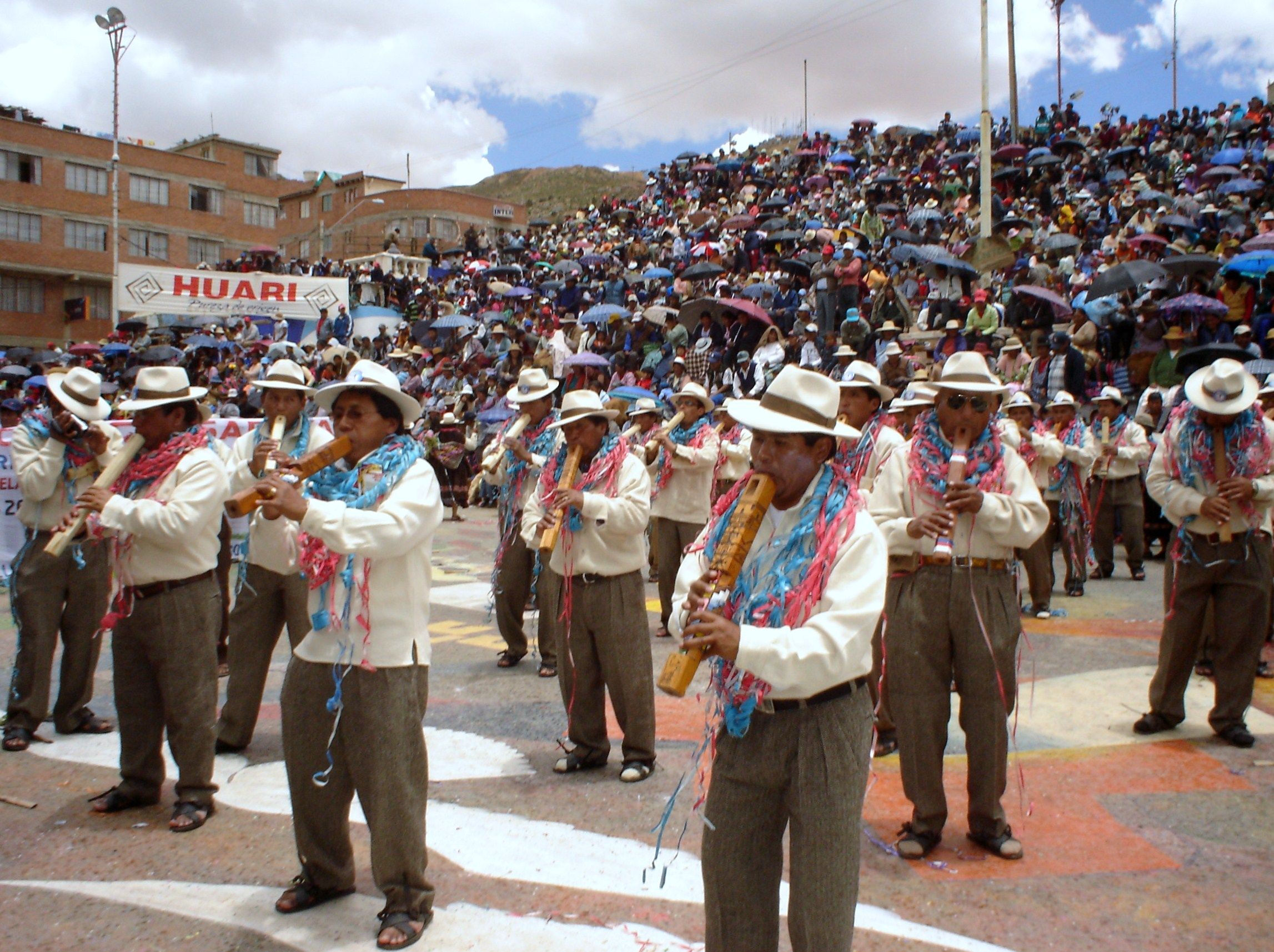
Group performing a Tarkeada, Carnaval de Oruro 2011

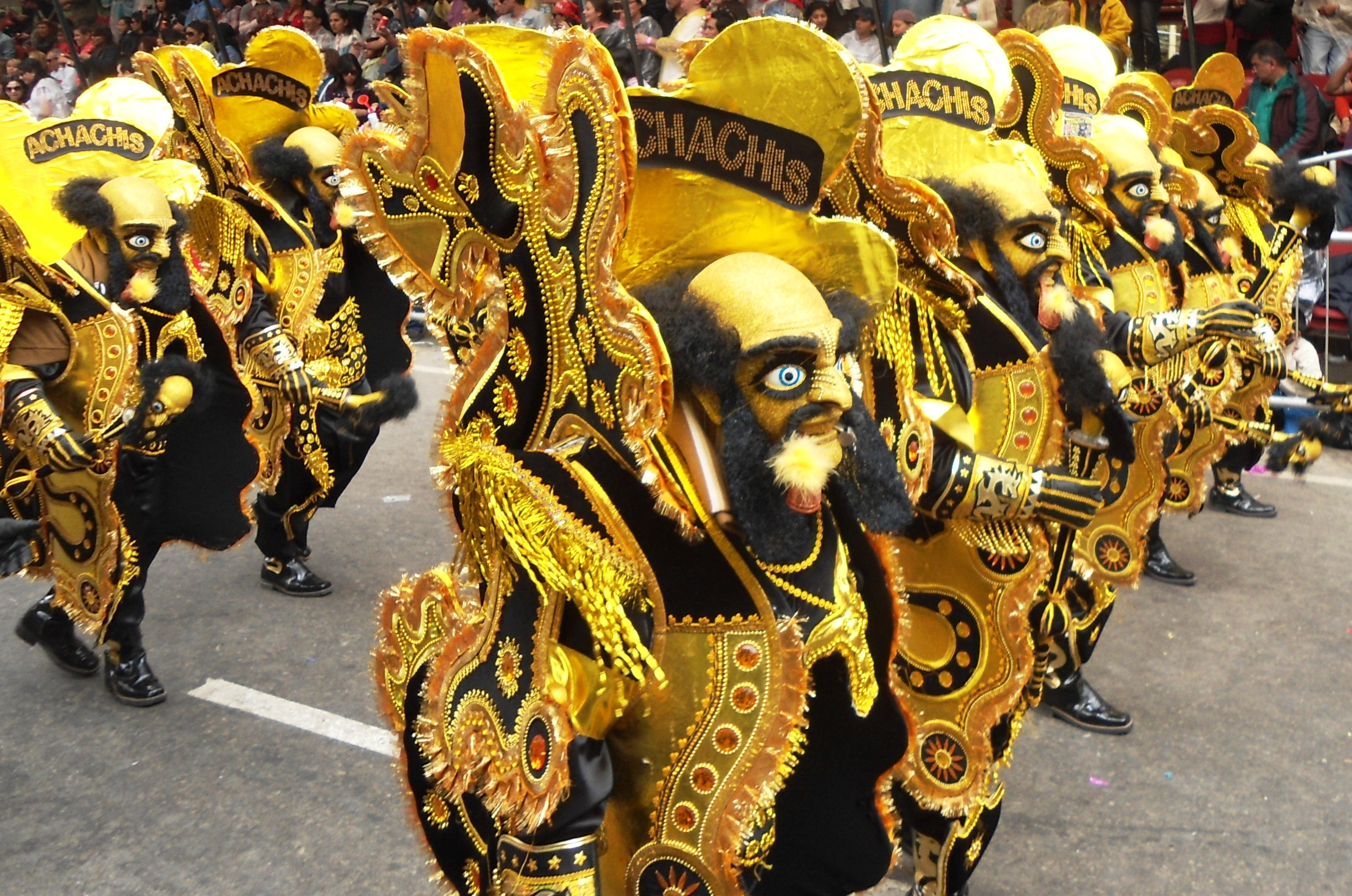
Morenada, Achachis block at the 2012 Carnaval de Oruro

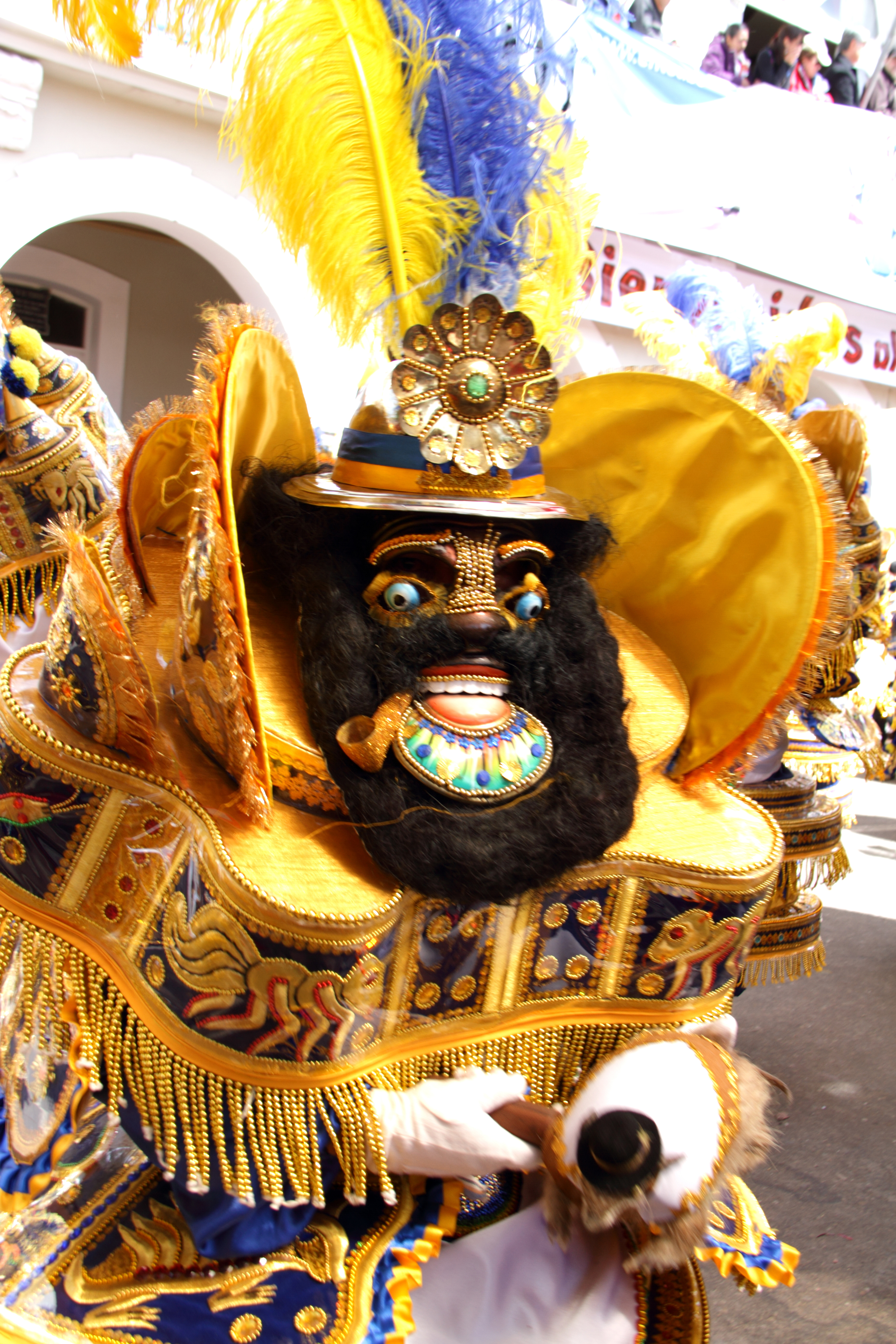
Moreno de tropa participating in the Morenada dance at the 2012 Carnaval de Oruro

== Others ==
- Diablada
- El Tío
