= Bolivian =

Bolivian may refer to:

- Something of, or related to, Bolivia
  - Bolivian people
  - Demographics of Bolivia
  - Culture of Bolivia
- SS Bolivian, later SS Alfios, a British-built standard cargo ship
