= Oruro (disambiguation) =

Oruro is a city in Bolivia, the capital of the Oruro Department.

Oruro may also refer to:

- Carnaval de Oruro, a religious and cultural festival
- Oruro Department, one of nine departments in Bolivia
