= Tinkus Wistus =

Bolivian cultural organization

The Tinkus Wistus cultural fraternity workshop was founded in 1992 by a group of Bolivian university students concerned to rescue one of the most traditional folk dances of the Andean culture.

From the vast range of native dances the group chose the Tinku and added in their name the Aymara word "wistu" meaning "crooked", in allusion to the movements of the dance.

Their aim is to preserve the Andean cultural values and to encourage Bolivian youth to know and respect its own culture.

The Tinkus Wistus first performed at the Folklore Show of the UMSA (Universidad Mayor de San Andres) in La Paz in 1993; at the 1994 show they won first place, and since then have performed at numerous festivals and displays, representing Bolivia at the World Congress of Folklore in Canada in 1998.
