= Performing Life, Inc =

NGO incorporated in New Mexico, US

Performing Life, Inc is an NGO incorporated in the state of New Mexico, US. Performing Life, Inc was founded in 2005 to help improve the lives of children who work or live on the street in Cochabamba, Bolivia. The project initially used juggling – as a form of performance art – to provide positive pathways for the participants but now also provides a music project and support to the families of working youth through micro-enterprise and weaving ventures which remain important to pre-Columbian cultures such as the Quechua.

== History ==
=== In Brief ===
Performing Life is a youth-led-and-managed NGO incorporated in the state of New Mexico, US, to work with street youth in Cochabamba, Bolivia. John Connell founded the organization in 2005 when he was 18 years old.

The precarious side of street life became reality to Connell when a gang of cleferos (glue sniffers), who often prey on the working youth, attacked him. After the attack he contracted foot rot and could not work for several weeks. Many other experiences and stories affected Connell and subsequently led him to return to the US in 2004 and create what was to become Performing Life.

Since its inception Performing Life has received guidance and major financial support from Tony Bellizzi, founder of Hope for the Children (a non-profit organization committed to increasing justice for street children). In the past Bellizzi has been described as "a terse man who lives with complex contradictions" due to his optimistic yet tough outlook on life.

== The Performing Life Projects ==
=== The Performing Arts Project ===
Performance Arts classes were created to help youth learn juggling techniques and gain experiencing performing. Subsequently, the students have also learnt play acting skills and performed in Cochabamba's Plaza Principal as well as the mARTadero musical festival.

=== The Weaving Woman Project ===
The Weaving Women Project began in 2009 with the aim of helping women who are working in the streets of Cochabamba and have saleable craft skills. The woman are given microloans to create woven goods which can then be sold in western countries such as the United States.

=== The Music Project ===
The music project has been active since 2009. The project focuses on the creative aspects of making music, especially within the genre of hip hop, with the goal of working and training the youth to produce a series of albums.

The albums released since 2009 include Hip Hop Kayma Vol. 1, Hip Hop Kayma Vol. 2, and MIXTAPE VOZ DE LA CALLE. The project reported on its Myspace page that the release if Hip Hop Kayma Vol. 3 is scheduled to in late 2010.

In 2010 MTV Iggy online interviewed the Performing Life music director, Oscar Ribadeneira, about the effect the project has had on the participants. In that interview Ribadeneira stated that "the kids develop and gain higher self-esteem just by writing down their own life experience, hearing the heartfelt messages of their songs and how happy they are when they hear their own songs and watch their videos[…]these are the moments that drive us to keep pushing forward and continue to offer them the opportunity to create".

== Discography ==
=== Albums ===
Album	Year
Hip Hop Kayma Vol. 1	2009
Hip Hop Kayma Vol. 2	2010
MIXTAPE VOZ DE LA CALLE	2010
