= Tinku =

Bolivian Quechua dance and musical tradition

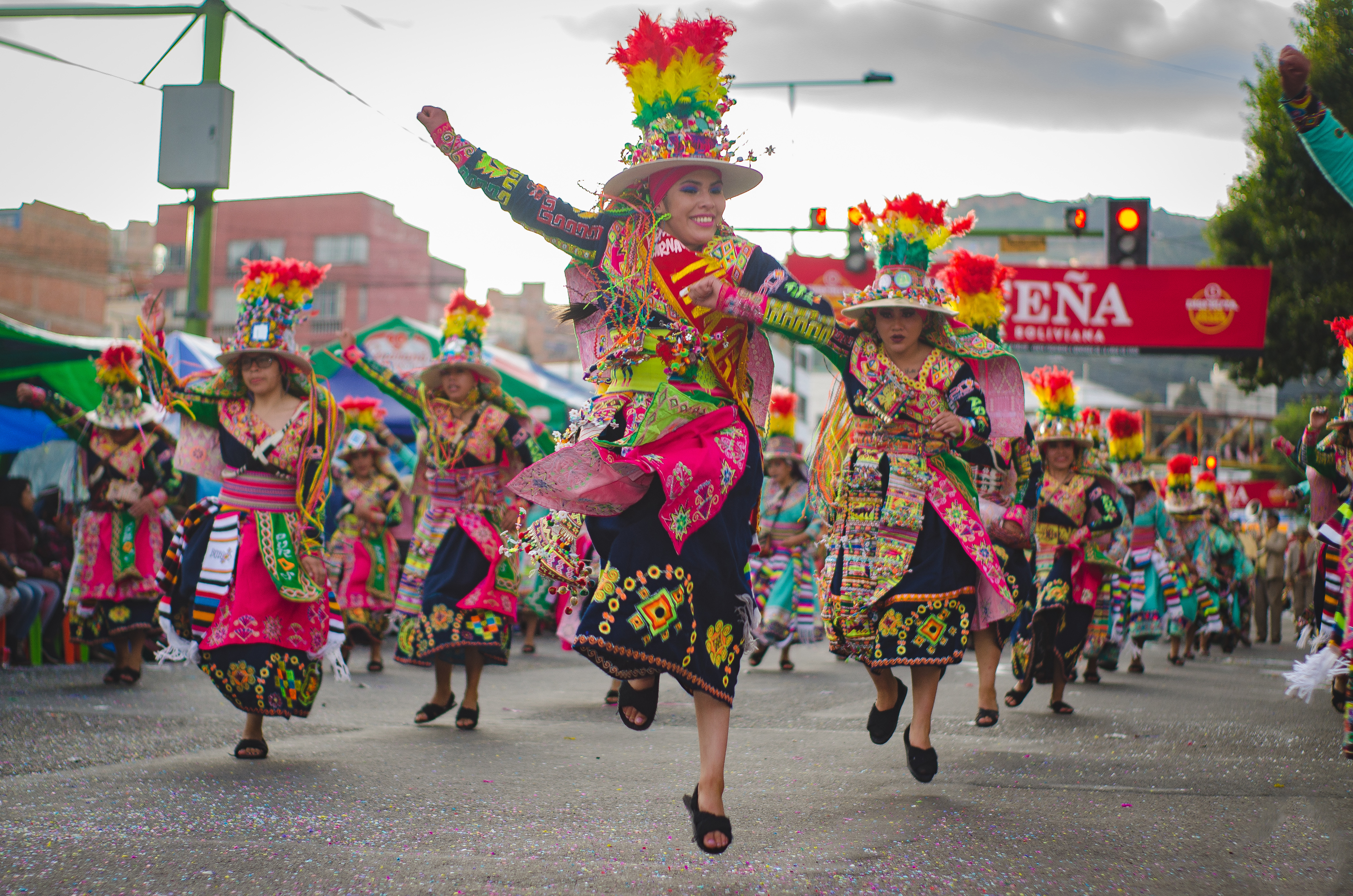
Tinku dancers dancing and performing the dance at the Oruro carnival, in Bolivia

Tinku is a Bolivian Quechua tradition from Norte Potosí which began as a form of ritualistic combat. In the Quechua language, it means "meeting-encounter". During this ritual, men and women from different communities will meet and begin the festivities by dancing. The women will then form circles and begin chanting while the men proceed to fight each other; eventually the women will join in the fighting as well. Large tinkus are held in Potosí during the first few weeks of May.

Pututu trumpets were used by the people in order to call for a Tinku encounter, as well as to assemble the peasants when the hacendado required of their presence. Tinku dance costumes are colorful and decorative. Women wear a dress, abarcas, and a hat and men wear an undershirt, pants, jacket, sandals (abarcas), and hard helmet like hats.

Because of the rhythmic way the men throw their fists at each other, and because they stand in a crouched stance going in circles around each other, a dance was formed. This dance, the Festive Tinku, simulates the traditional combat, bearing a warlike rhythm. The differences between the Andean tradition and the dance are the costumes, the role of women, and the fact that the dancers do not actually fight each other. The Festive Tinku has become a cultural dance for all of Bolivia, although it originated in Potosí.

== Tinku combat ==
=== History ===
The Bolivian tradition began with the indigenous belief in Pachamama, or Mother Nature. The combat is in praise of Pachamama, and any blood shed throughout the fighting is considered a sacrifice, in hopes of a fruitful harvest and fertility. Because of the violent nature of the tradition there have been fatalities, but each death is considered a sacrifice which brings forth life, and a donation to the land that fertilizes it. The brawls are also considered a mean of release of frustration and anger between the separate communities. Tinkus usually last two to three days. During this time, participants will stop every now and then to eat, sleep, or drink.

=== Methods of combat ===
During the brawl itself, men will often carry rocks in their hands to have greater force in their punches, or they will just throw them at opponents. Sometimes, especially in the town of Macha in Potosí, where the brawl gets the most violent, men will wrap strips of cloth with shards of glass stuck to them around their fists to cause greater damage. Slingshots and whips are also used, though not as much as hand-to-hand combat. The last day of the fight is considered the most violent and police almost always have to separate the mass of bloody men and women.

=== Attire ===
Men attend tinkus wearing traditional monteras, or thick helmet-like hats made of thick leather, resembling helmets from the Conquistadors. These helmets are often painted and decorated with feathers. Their pants are usually simple black or white with traditional embroidering near their feet. Often the men wear wide thick belts tied around their waist and stomach for more protection.

== Festive Tinku dance ==
The Festive Tinku, a much more pleasant experience than a ceremonial tinku, has many differences. It has been accepted as a cultural dance in the whole nation of Bolivia. Tinku music has a loud constant drum beat to give it a native warlike feel, while charangos, guitars, and zampoñas (panpipes) play melodies. The dancers perform with combat like movements, following the heavy beat of the drum.

=== Costumes ===
For men, the costumes are more colorful. Their monteras are usually decorated with long colorful feathers. Tinku Suits, or the outfits men wear during Festive Tinku performances, are usually made with bold colors to symbolize power and strength, instead of the neutral colors worn in ceremonial tinkus that help participants blend in. Women wear long embroidered skirts and colorful tops. Their costumes are completed by extravagant hats, painted and decorated with various long and colorful feathers and ribbons. Men and women wear walking sandals so they can move and jump easily.

=== Dance ===
The dance is performed in a crouching stance, bending at the waist. Arms are thrown out and there are various kicks, while the performers move in circles following the beat of the drum. Every jump from one foot to the next is followed by a hard stomp and a thrown fist to signify the violence from the ceremonial tinku. Many times the dancers will hold basic and traditional instruments in their hands that they will use as they stomp, just to add more noise for a greater effect.

== See also ==
- Takanakuy
- Tinkus Wistus
