= Waka waka (dance) =

Bolivian dance

- Origin: Bolivia

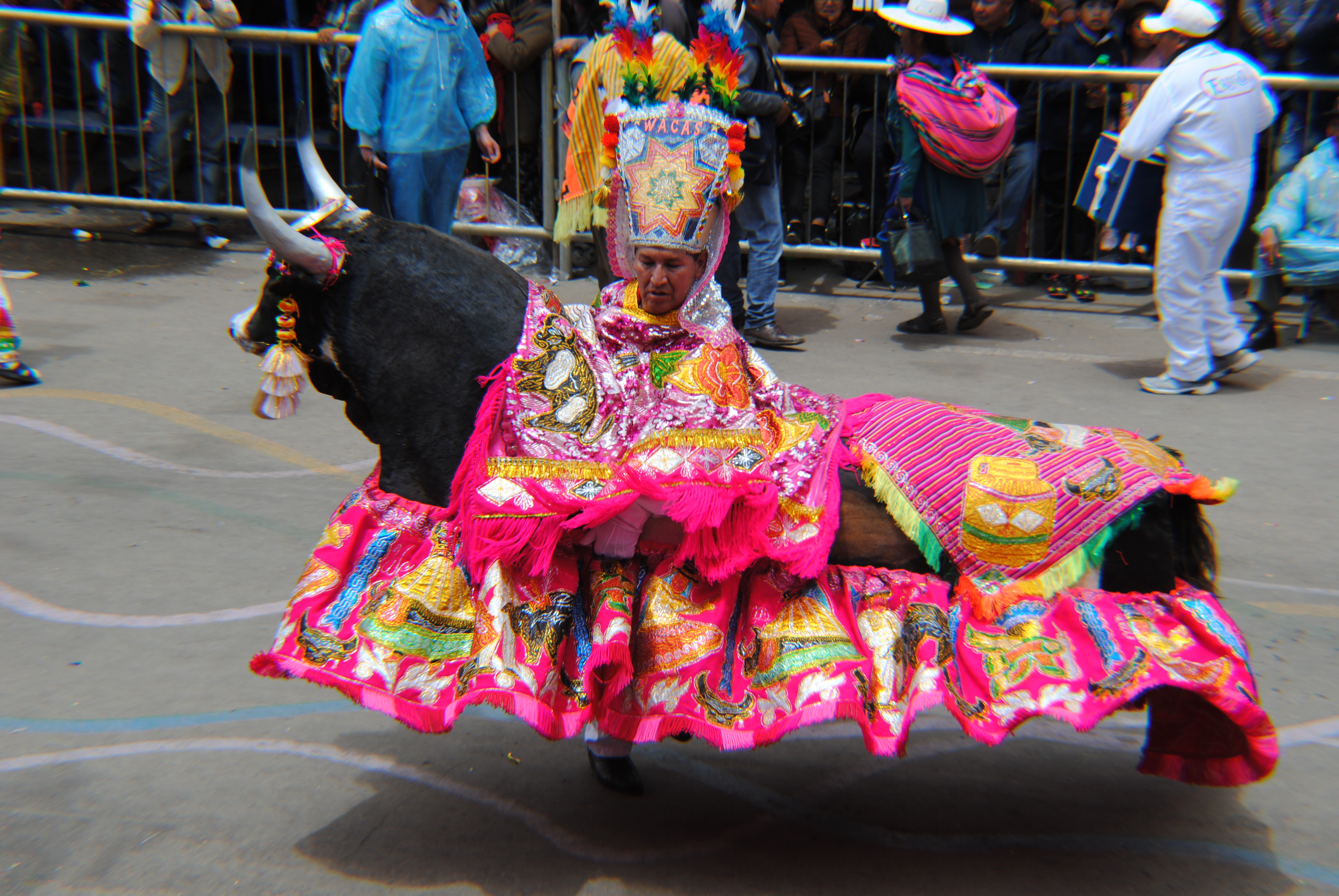
Waka Waka dancer at the Bolivian Carnival

Waka Waka or Waka Thuqhuri Tinti Waka is an urban popular dance from Bolivia. Its autochthonous origin is found in the Municipality of Umala, Province of Aroma, Department of La Paz. There are other variants, such as the native of Waka Tinti originally from the community of Cairiri, the municipality of Umala, the Province of Aroma de La Paz, Tinti Caballo and the native of Waka Tinki originally from the Paxsiamaya region, Prov. Los Andes of the Department of La Paz.

What differentiates the urban version of its rural variants is not only music and clothing, but also the choreographic content of dance.

The women who participate in this dance usually wear dozens of skirts on their hips. In spite of this, they move their waists from side to side to the rhythm of the music and the sound of the bells that hang from the neck of the bulls that the men carry.

As characters are the milkmaids or guides and the k'aisillas that are the pastoral girls. The kusillos are young dancers who go from one place to another jumping and making people happy. There are also the oldest jilakatas or dancers, and the bullfighter or kausalla.

In 2004, the Official Office of Cultures of La Paz chose the dance as emblematic of the La Paz del Gran Poder festival.

In 2007, the dance was declared, through resolution 1752 of the Departmental Council, as Cultural and Intangible Historical Heritage of the Department of La Paz, and Intangible Cultural Heritage of Bolivia in 2012.

It is one of the traditional dances of the Oruro Carnival, declared by UNESCO as the Masterpiece of the Oral and Intangible Heritage of Humanity.
