= Tobas =

Bolivian folkloric dance

The dance of the Tobas is a Bolivian folkoric dance created in the city of Oruro in the early 20th century. Currently, it is performed in important festivals such as the Carnaval de Oruro and the Fiesta del Gran Poder. Its origin is urban and it holds little relation to the Toba people, although this tribe was the main inspiration for its creation.

On March 24, 2014, the Bolivian government declared the dance of the Toba as tangible and intangible heritage of the nation, with the contribution of Bolivian researcher Juan Manuel Cuellar Carpio. Every January 24th, the day national day of the dance of the Tobas is celebrated in Bolivia.

The dance is also present in festivities outside Bolivia, such as the Carnaval con la Fuerza del Sol in Arica (Chile), the Fiesta de la Virgen de la Candelaria in Puno (Peru) and the Entrada Folclórica de Integración Cultural in Buenos Aires (Argentina).

== History ==
The Tobas were a tribe of warriors that lived in the Chaco region of Bolivia. The Incas admired their dance and they were taken from their Amazonian homeland by the Emperor Tupac Yupanqui. The dance and music of the Tobas have been reinterpreted by subsequent people of Bolivia.

The history of the dance of the Tobas begins in the early 20th century when the Bolivian Tomás Cáceres Nava, who had worked in the mining centers of the department of Oruro (in San José, La Colorada and the Itos Mine), travelled to southern Bolivia with his son Donato Cáceres Véliz in search of new mining explorations. They arrived at the religious festivity of San Roque in the city of Tarija, and they were fascinated to witness the dance of the Chunchos, pilgrims of San Roque.

Around the year 1905, Tomás and his son returned to Oruro with the idea of creating a comparsa inspired by the dance of the Chunchos of San Roque. Researcher Juan Manuel Cuellar Carpio has stated that the Cáceres family did not have the intention of creating a new dance in a short period of time but rather that the creation of the dance of the Tobas can be attributed to a process of acceptance and development. Tomás and Donato Cáceres' comparsa started performing a dance inspired by the Chunchos of San Roque in the year 1905 in the Carnaval de Oruro and other religious festivities in the mining centers of the city of Oruro, which were booming at the time. When the spectating public saw the costumes worn during their performances, they started calling them the comparsa of the Ch'unch'us, a pejorative term used by the Aymara people to designate any indigenous group of the lowlands, who they considered to be savages. Another term the public used to designate the comparsa was Cambá, but the most used one was “comparsa de los tobas” ("comparsa of the Tobas" in English). This was due to the popularization of the international news of the mysterious death of the French explorer Jules Crevaux in 1882, who would have been killed by the Toba people on the banks of the Pilcomayo river.

Tomás and Donato Cáceres' comparsa was officially organized with the support of miners on January 14, 1917 with the name “Comparsa de Tobas de Oruro” ("Comparsa of the Tobas of Oruro" in English) in the South Zone. They adopted the costumes as well as some steps from the dance of the Chunchos de San Roque but also replaced the original music of their dance with another one of greater agility.

In 1945, Cristobal Franco, a respected artist of the dance and music of Oruro who promoted the development of native dances for many decades, founded the Comparsa Tobas Zona Central. Later, in 1984, a group of dancers, with the intention of recovering the comparsas that had disappeared, reorganizeed the Comparsa de Tobas San José and the Comparsa Tobas Zona Central. They decided to give it a symbolic date of foundation of 1911 as a way to commemorate and recognize the “carreritos”, people who were dedicated to the transport in hand carts, and their contributions in the development of the dance of the Tobas.

The dance, which originally employed using pinquillos and quenas, has been performed with bronze instruments in 1960.

Today, Tobas is a prominent part of many festivities, such as the Carnaval de Oruro or the Bolivian Festival in Virginia, among others.

== Dance ==
The Tobas dance is a representation of energy - a singular dance with jumps performed by the dancers to impress the audience. The dance is performed during religious and other festivities as well as the Oruro Carnival. Performing the dance requires physical strength, stamina, and coordination.

Each dance step has a traditional name and style. For example: Bolivar involves fast regular jumps; camba features high, one-meter jumps; chucu-chucu uses a rapid rhythm and tiptoe movements; and the cullahui jump is another distinctive element.

== Costume ==
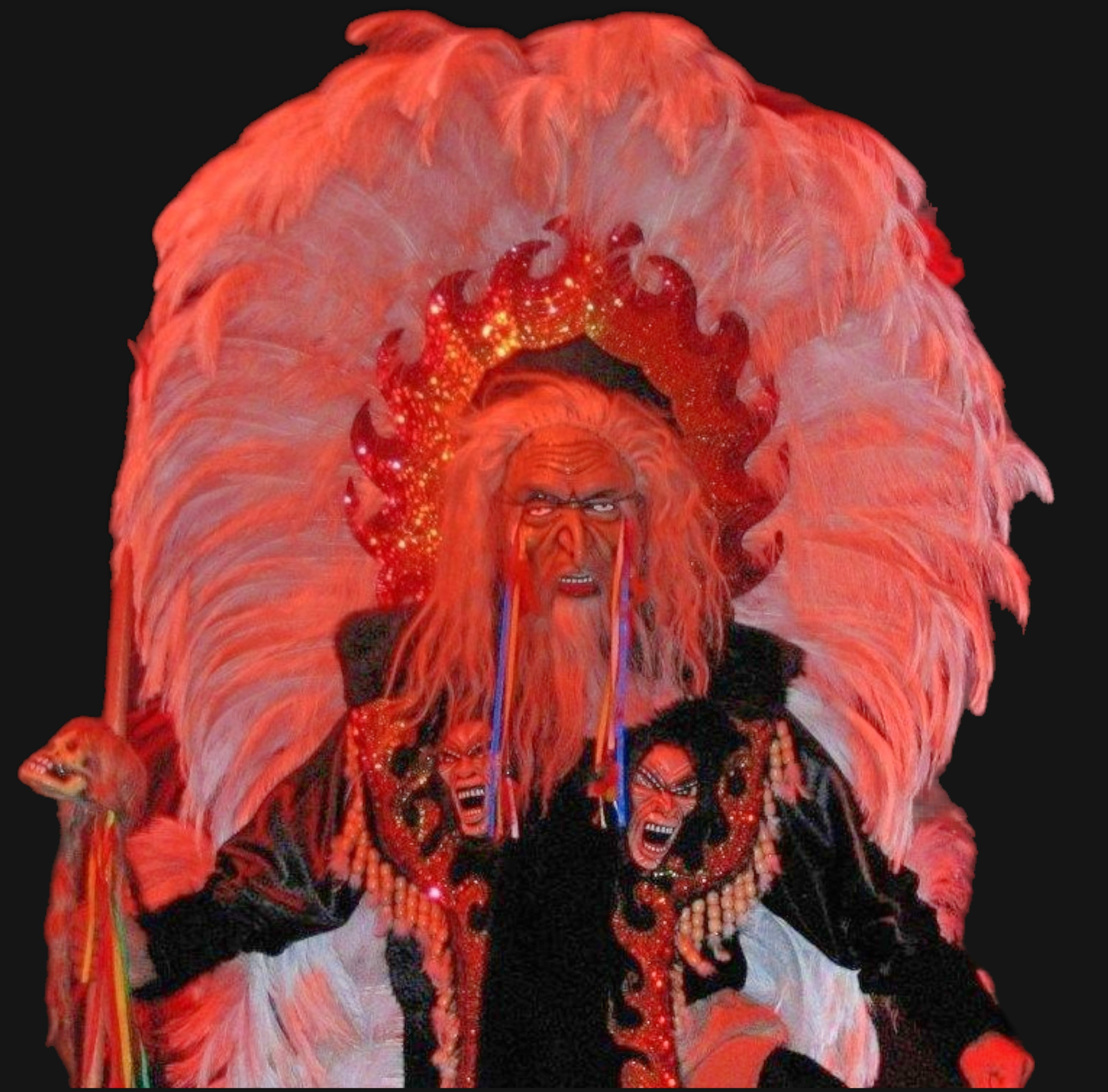
Typical Tobas costume Tobas

The typical Tobas costume is headwear entirely made of feathers, decorated with jewels, a skirt and top decorated made with colorful fabrics, with beads and fringes on the bottom, with cows feet sewed onto fabric to tie around the ankle, spear or hatchet, bracelet of feathers, and an anklet of feathers.
