= Llamerada =

Bolivian dance

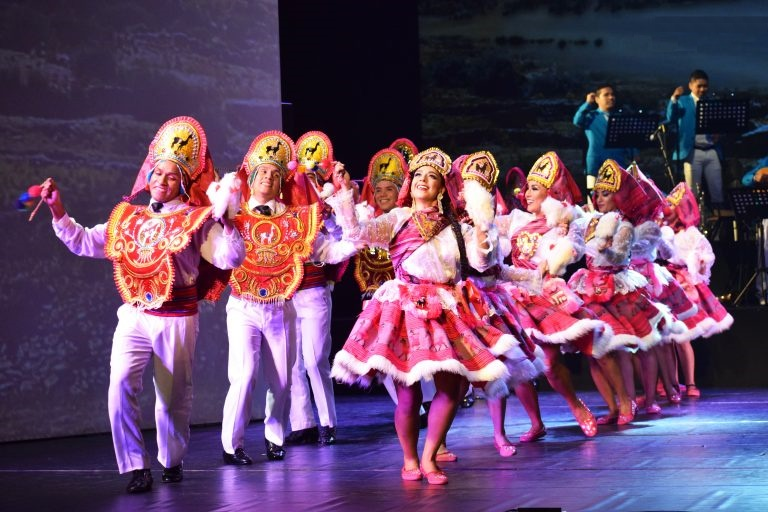
Llamerada is a dance that is practiced in Bolivia and Peru. The dance is inspired by llama herders and shepherds.

Llamerada It is a representation of the llama muleteers who went from the highlands altiplano to the valleys to exchange products, using the llama as a means of transporting products. It is also a remembrance of the task of herding llamas and has historical religious value as a ritual of good fortune.

This dance is meant to represent the Highland llama holders and breeders. Therefore, the dancers (male) traditionally hold a little llama in their left hand while rotating the "honda" in their right. Some claim that the Llamerada is a very old, even Inca dance, an argument mainly based on the fact that llama herding has been very important to the indigenous peoples of the Andes for centuries and the Inca Empire encompassed parts of Bolivia. There is very little known about how the actual version emerged; even the costumes have changed a lot during the last few decades. The headdress used at present is said to represent the traditional headdress of Aymara leaders (in both sides of Lake Titicaca) and in fact it resembles the headdress of the "Mama Talla", the wife of an Aymara Community leader.
