= Siklla =

Type of dance

Siklla (Quechua for a type of plants with blue blossoms / fine-looking, elegant, beautiful, proud), Wayra (Quechua) or Doctorcitos (Spanish for little doctors) is a satirical folk dance in Bolivia and Peru. The dance is a mockery of the Spanish lawyers of the colonial period.
