= Morenada =

Andean folk dance

- Cultural origins: African, European and Native American communities in Bolivia
- Typical instruments: Matraca, cymbal, bass drum, trumpet, tuba.

Other topics
- Music of Bolivia Music of Peru

The morenada is a popular Bolivian folk dance. This dance is practiced mainly in Bolivia and Peru as well as in Chile, Argentina, and other countries.

Morenada is one of the most representative dances of Bolivian culture. This importance stands out for the dissemination of dance and music in the patron and civic festivals in different regions of the country. The morenada was declared Cultural Heritage of Bolivia in 2011, through Law No. 135, for its recognized importance at national and national level international.

In Peru, the morenada is a typical dance in the Peruvian highlands, in the Puno region, and is part of the Feast of the Virgin of La Candelaria, Intangible Cultural Heritage of Humanity by UNESCO. It is also practiced and disseminated in the departments of Tacna and Moquegua due to the presence of Aymara population.

In Chile, the morenada is practiced mainly in the Carnaval Internacional con la Fuerza del Sol in Arica and cultural organizations, the authorities and the Chilean population recognize and affirm that the morenada is a Bolivian dance of Bolivian origin.

In Argentina, the morenada is danced in Buenos Aires, mostly by the Bolivian Immigrant Community. The Argentine population states that the morenada is a Bolivian dance.

== Theories about the origin of the dance ==
Dance whose origin dates back to the colonial era and is inspired by the slave trade, from the transfer of black people brought by the Spanish conquerors to work as workers in the Bolivian silver mines, recently initiated by the Aymara dressed up as black people and representing characters like the caporal and the black troop. The "morenos" dance evokes the days of the colony. This dance born precisely in the brotherhoods of slaves from Africa who mocked the dances of the white majority of settlers, inclusive of those involved in the mining industry and related sectors.

Then, the dance of the "morenos", changes its name in a historical process of acceptance of it, towards all social classes in Oruro, Bolivia. Such is the case of the "Comparsa de Morenos de los Veleros" born in 1913 and "Comparsa de los Morenos" of 1924 founded by Aymara migrant families and that come from the ancient dancers of the "comparsa de morenos" of the mid-century XIX, finally adopted the name of "morenada" in 1950 and 1954, respectively.

=== African slavery in Potosí theory ===
The most commonly shared theory says that the dance was inspired by the sufferings of the African slaves brought to Bolivia in order to work in the Silver Mines of Potosí. The enormous tongue of the dark masks is meant to represent the physical state of these mines workers and the rattling of the Matracas are frequently associated with the rattling of the slaves' chains. However, there is no evidence that these African slaves actually worked in the mines, although there is much evidence that they worked in the Casa de la Moneda (mint) in the production of coins and in domestic service.

=== Winemaking in Oruro theory ===
A second theory relates the morenada to the African slaves who settled in the Oruro region for wine production. This theory holds that African slaves made wine in Oruro with grapes collected and transferred from the La Paz valley to be marketed in the mining centers of Oruro. The dance morenada would originate by imitating the treading of the grapes in the Oruro wineries and the barrel-shaped costumes would represent the barrel that contains the wine. At first sight this makes the theory seem extremely unprovable, but the first chants in the morenada allude to the African slaves who worked in winemaking. In addition, if one goes far enough back in history, one can discover that there were Afro-Bolivians working in vineyards - in other regions, such as Chuquisaca. Nowadays there might not be any Afro-Bolivians left where there are wineyards, but when the dance was created, there might have been.

=== Cave paintings in La Paz theory ===
Cave painting in the locality of Chirapaca, Los Andes Province (Bolivia) depicting what is believed to be morenada dancers between the centuries 17th and 18th.

The third theory relates the morenada to the Aymara people from the La Paz. Places such as Achacachi claim to be the place of origin of the "Fish Dance", as the morenada in this region also is called. Some murals about 200–300 years old were found in the region, showing morenada dancers and there still is a strong tradition of making elaborately embroidered morenada costumes.

=== African population of the Puno highlands ===
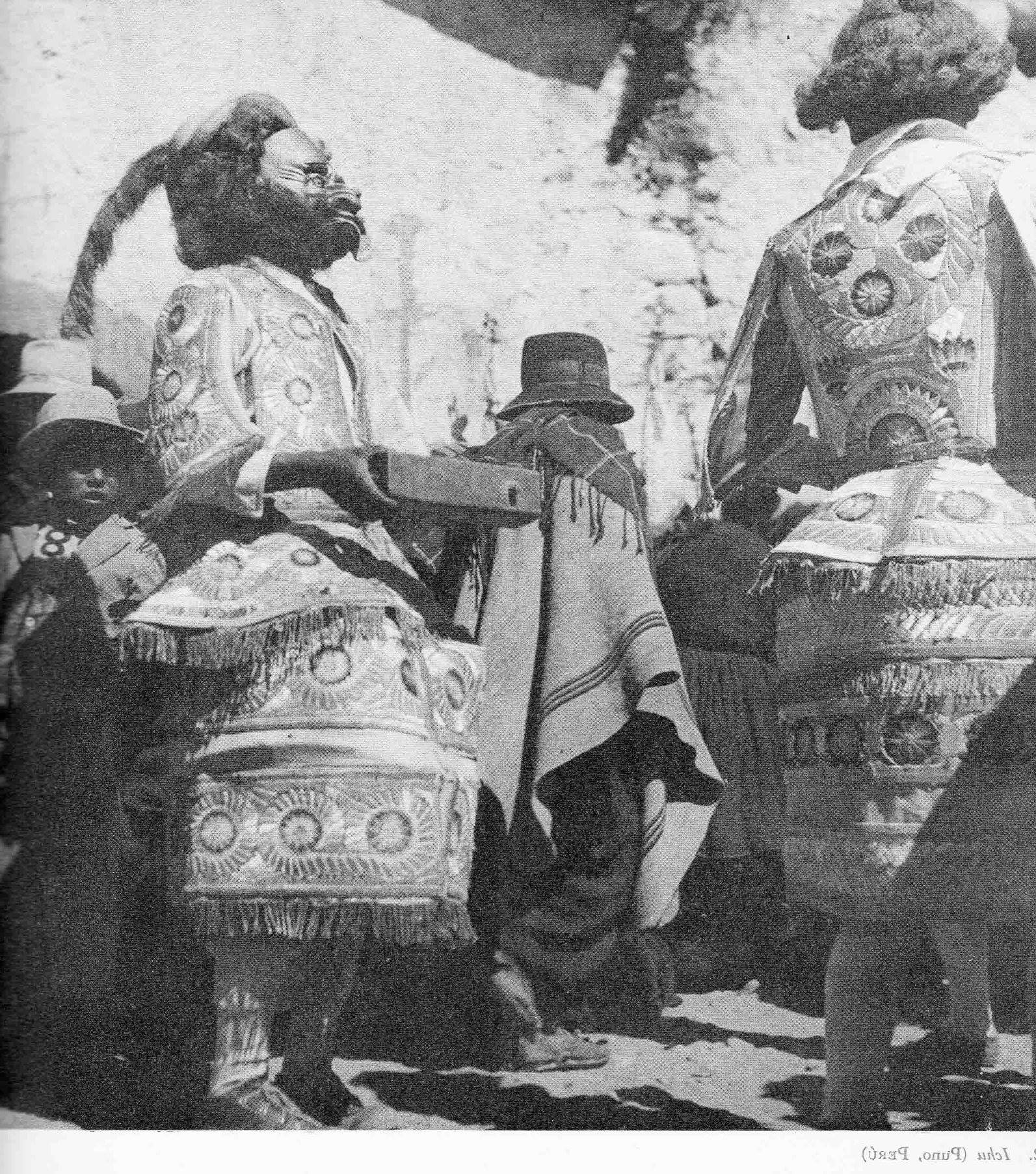
Moreno in the locality of Ichu, Puno depicting what is believed to be morenada dancers between the centuries 19th and 20th.

In the colonial era of the Viceroyalty of Peru, there is already a black population register in the Puno highlands, as documented in 1602 Ludovico Bertonio, an Italian Jesuit based in Juli, Puno. "To these blacks, the Andean population called them: Ch'ara or yanaruna.58 And to the pronounced geta they had, they said: Lakha llint'a. At the beginning of the 17th century, according to Gonzales Holguín and Bertonio, the Africans were I alluded to them interchangeably as blacks or brunettes.

Another hypothesis comes from the Department of Puno in Peru, on the shores of Lake Titicaca (Puno). At the beginning of the 20th century, the presence of brunettes in devotion to the Virgen de la Candelaria is described in newspapers of the time:

- "Yesterday ... Three games of brunettes and numerous indigenous, have traveled the streets of the town" (El Eco de Puno, 1912)
- "From this morning they continue to travel the streets, the moorings, doing the usual home visits" (El Eco de Puno, 1916)
- “The most sumptuous presentation of brunettes is due in the calendar to the first days of February. It is an indigenous offering to the Virgin of the Candelaria, patron of Puno ”(El Pueblo, 1923)
- “The attendance of numerous“ morenos ”troupes gave the festival a tone of deep joy” (El Eco de Puno, 1932)

== Gallery ==
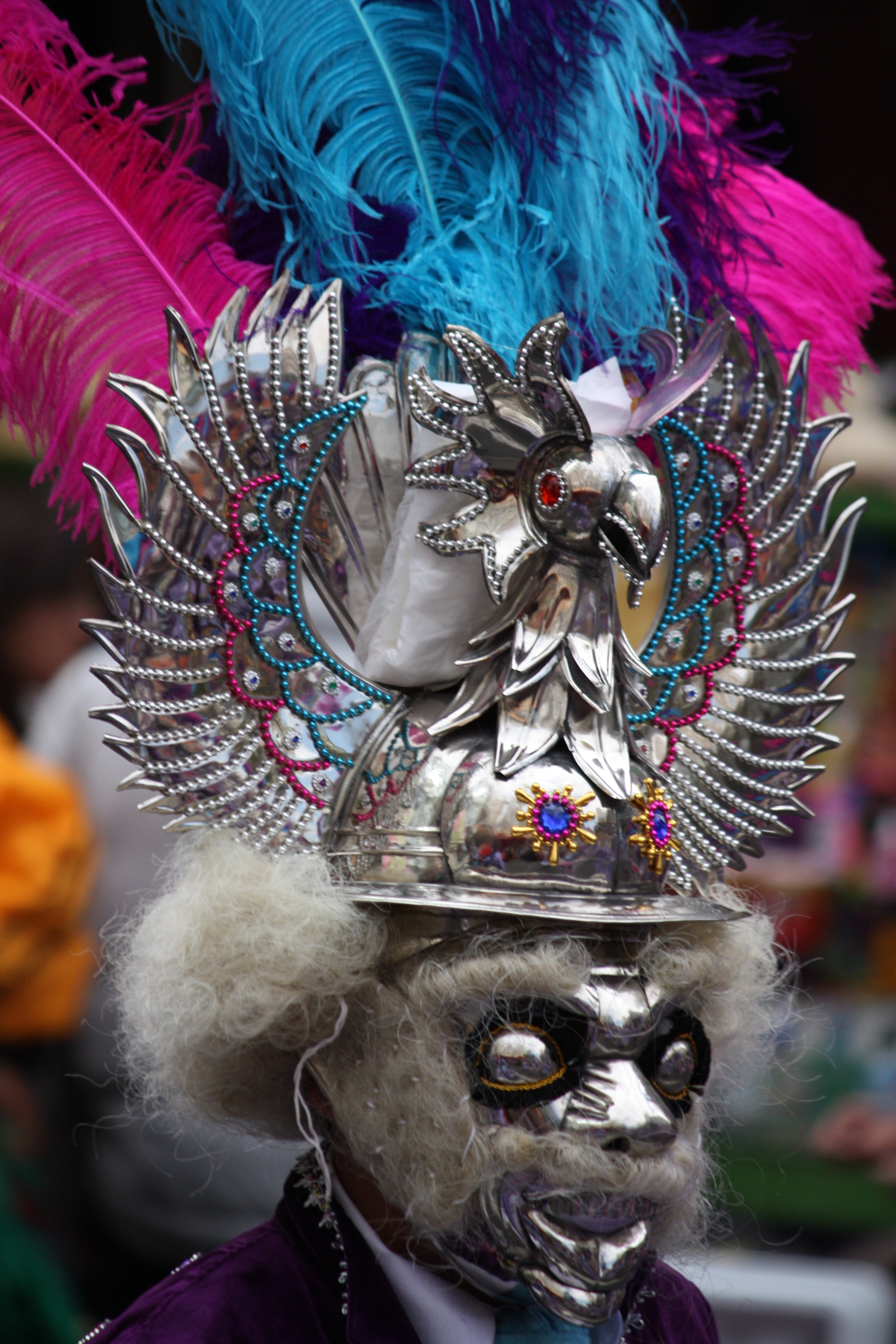
Morenada mask showing exaggerated features to represent the physical state.

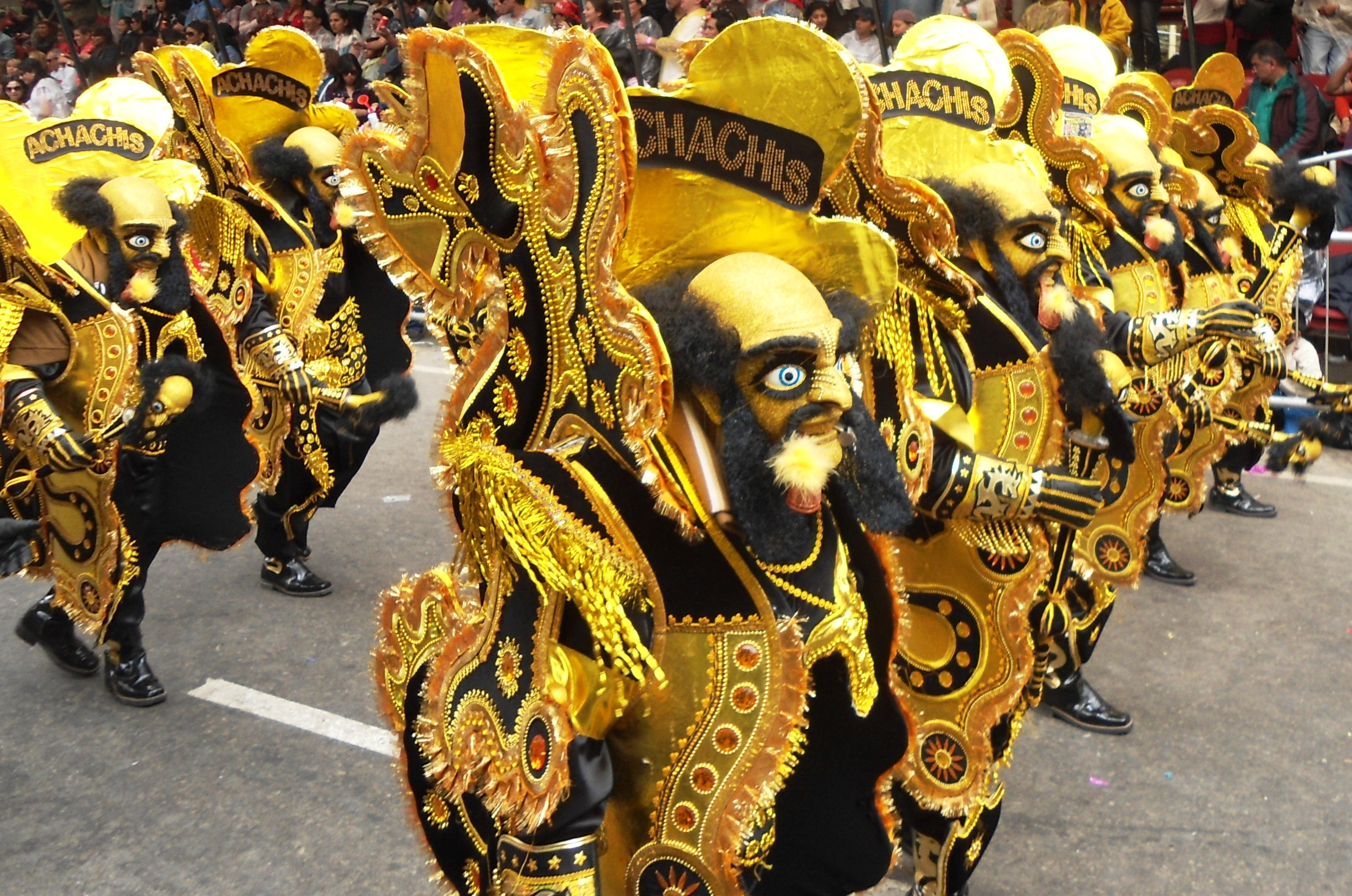
Morenada parade at the Oruro Carnival, 2012

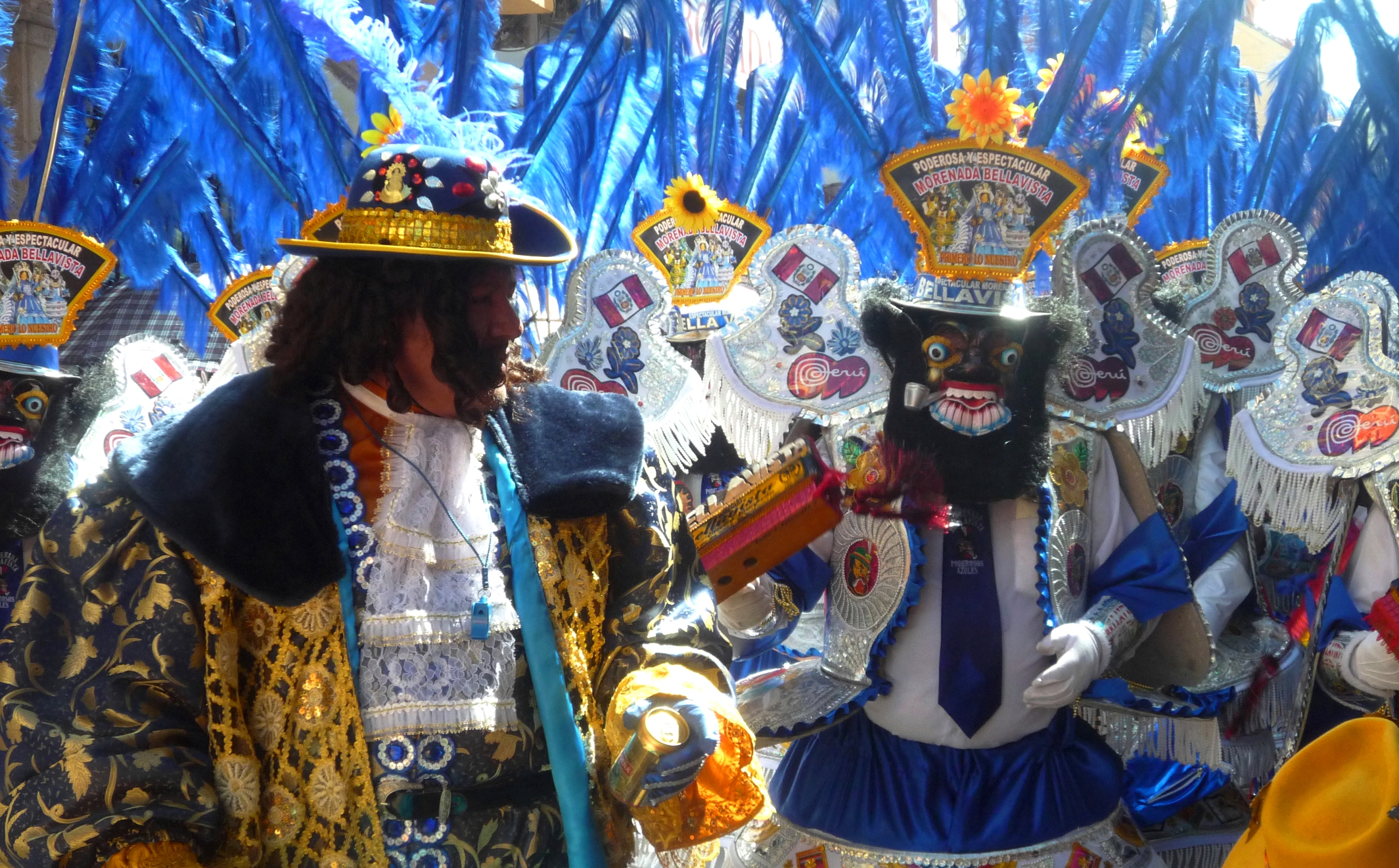
Morenada Bellavista parade at the Puno Candelaria, 2013

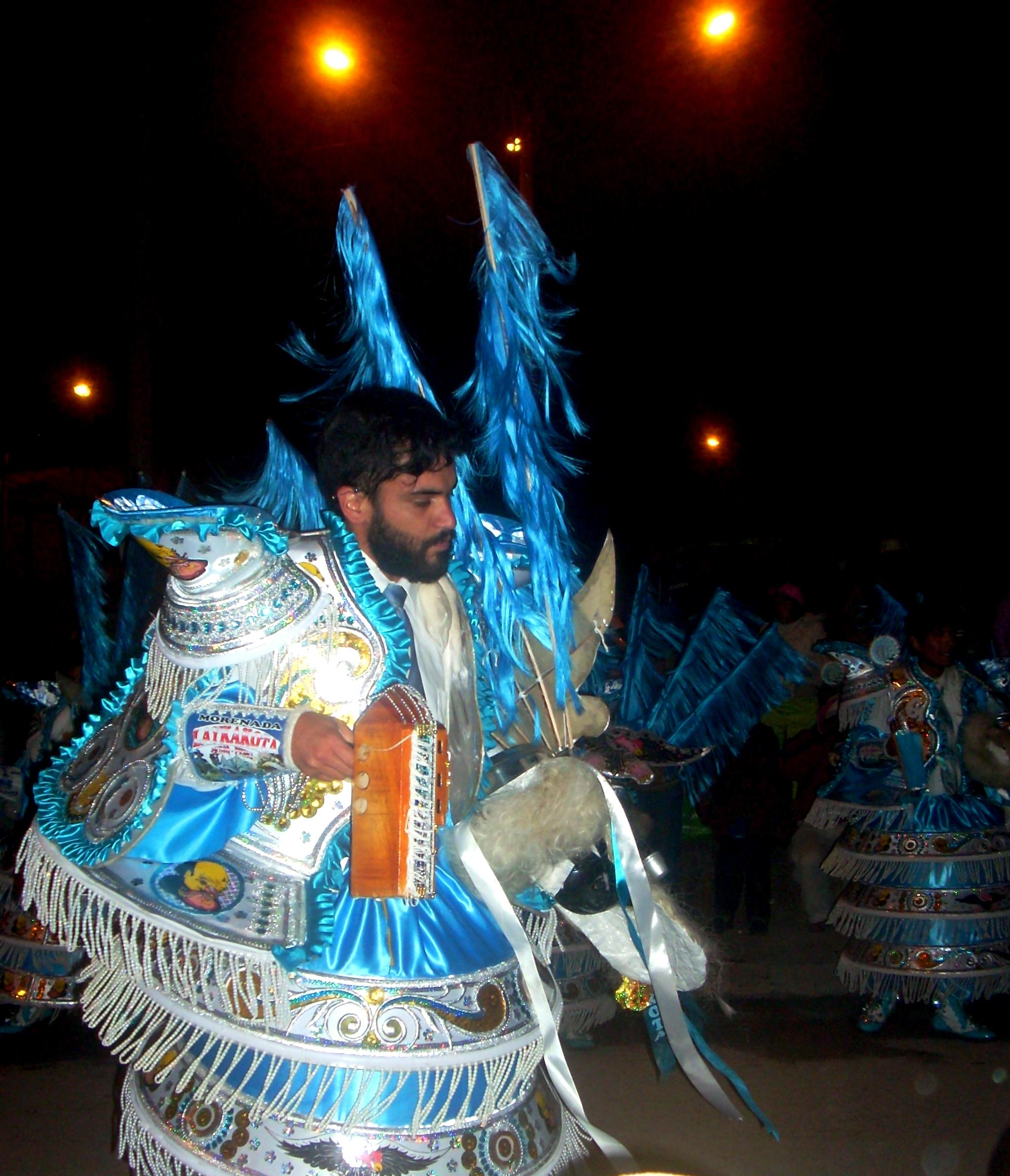
Morenada Laykakota parade at the Puno Candelaria, 2011
