= Caporales =

Traditional Bolivian dance

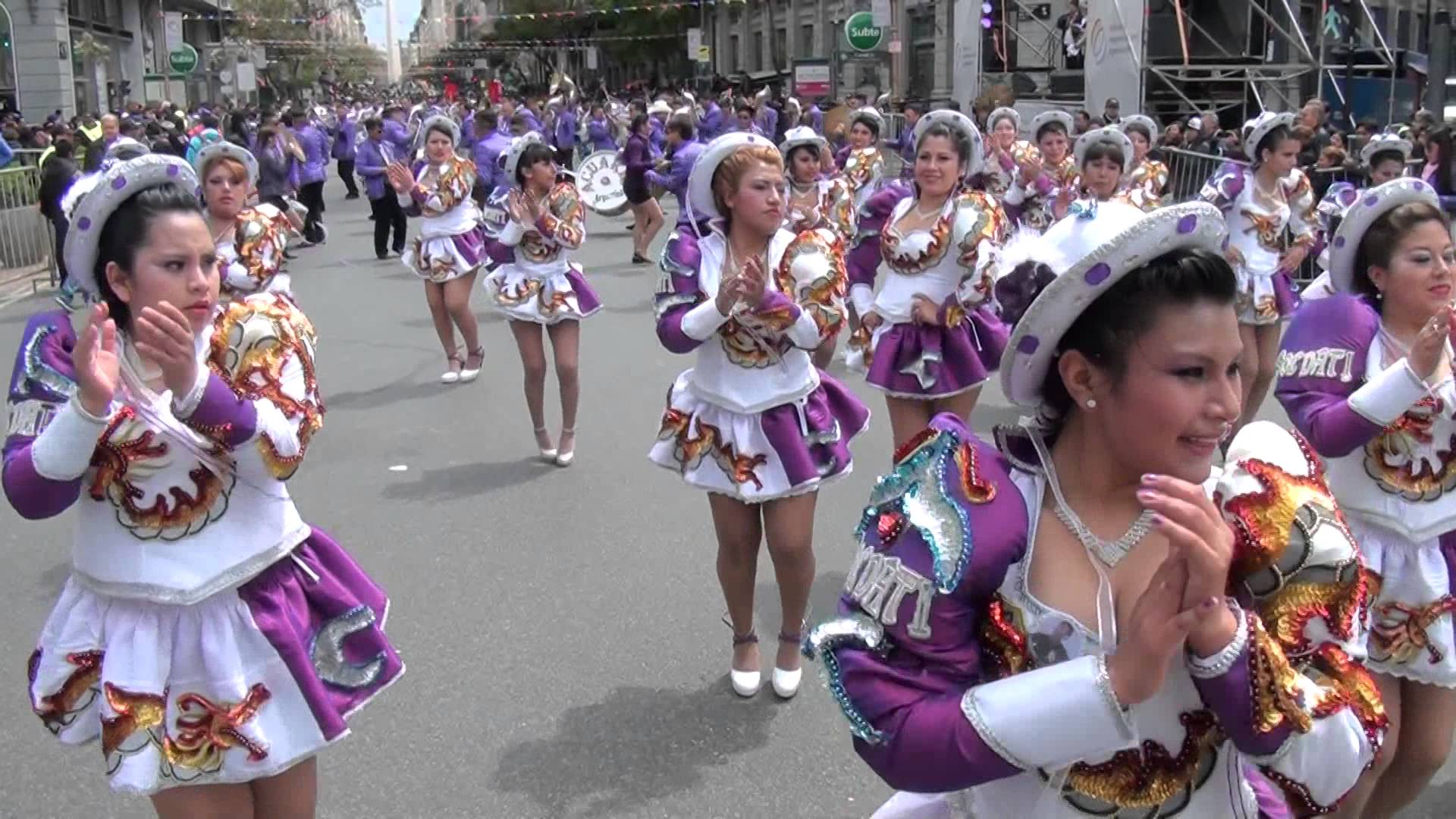
- Genre: Folk dance
- Year: 1969
- Origin: Saya, Negritos, Antiplano

The Caporales is a Bolivian folk dance. Caporales were created and presented to the public for the first time in 1969 by the Estrada Pacheco brothers in Bolivia, who were inspired in the character of the 'Caporal' who is the overseer of the black slaves and was usually mixed race, wore boots and held a whip, a dance that belongs to the region of the Yungas, Bolivia. The dance, however, has a prominent religious aspect. One supposedly dances for the Virgin of Socavón (patroness of miners) and promises to dance for three years of one's life. Caporal or caporales today is a folklore dance very popular in the festivities of not only Bolivia, but also Argentina, Chile, Peru, Spain and the United States.

In June 2011, through a Supreme Decree, Caporales along with other dances were declared Cultural and Intangible Heritage of the Plurinational State of Bolivia; according to the government entity, this measure was taken to curb the attempts of appropriation by neighboring countries.

There are many groups founded in US that participate and spread the culture, such as F.F.C.C. Universitarios de San Simón, Alma Boliviana, Renacer Boliviano, Sangre Boliviana, Centralistas San Miguel Virginia, Orgullo Boliviano, San Simon Universitartios Virginia, Fraternidad Folklorica Cultural Ruphay VA, Kantuta Ballet Folklorico de Bolivia and much more.

A male caporal dress depicts an old Spanish military guard (overseer of slaves). Wearing heeled boots bearing large bells known as "cascabeles", a male dancer carries a hat in his left hand and a whip in his right (sometimes). Even some girls will dance in a male role, as girls used to be relegated to wearing extremely short skirts and do less impressive steps; some may refer to them as "chinas" (literally: indigenous American women) or "machas" (literally: women). A female caporal dress consists of a minidress (representing a peasant woman) with matching panties (representing a newborn infant), skin-color pantyhose, fancy high-heeled shoes and a round top hat (resembling a traditional Bolivian bowler hat) pinned to her hair. The style and colors of the dress are maintained the same for both the men and women of a certain group, but can vary drastically between groups. Men and women usually dance separately in a progressive march style dance. Caporales is a dance where one jumps a lot and is very active in this way.

The dance is often mistaken for Saya music, a confusion partly due to popular Caporales song texts like the ones composed by the popular Bolivian group "Los Kjarkas"; this group makes many Bolivian songs. Also, this is due to an international ballet version of Saya Caporal being danced as "Modern Saya" (Afro-Bolivian Saya). However, caporales derive from 'Saya': as the 'caporal' was a character in 'saya' when the Caporales dance was created in the late 1960s by the Estrada Pacheco family, they claimed to have been inspired by the performance of some Afro-Bolivian dancers from the Yungas region. The music is clearly of both African and European origin and the bit of the drums are the steps of the mixture of 'saya' and 'negritos'. The costumes in caporales were of modern European origin. The rhythm is slightly different from the 'Saya'. This dance became one of the most popular dances in Bolivia, especially appreciated by young people of the middle and upper class who identified themselves with 'the caporal' and the macho antics of the dance, they form huge Caporales groups for Carnival, Gran Poder and other "entradas".
