= Pukllay =

Yampara dance

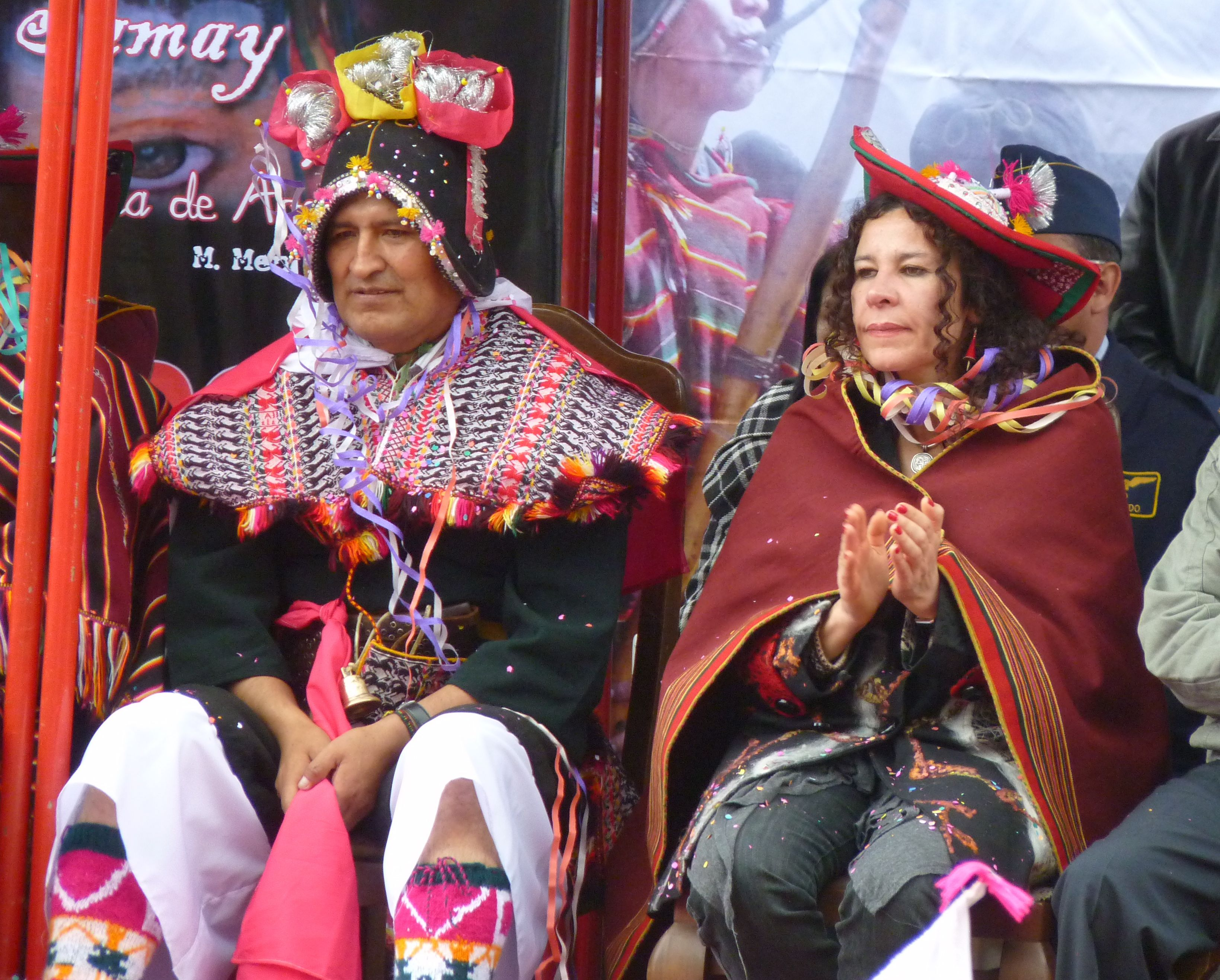
Former Bolivian President Evo Morales and Culture Minister Elizabeth Salguero attend the Pukllay festival which their administration has nominated for UNESCO recognition

Pukllay or phukllay (Quechua for to play, play / carnival, other spellings pucllay, pugllay, phujllay, pujhllay, pujllay, puqhllay) is a traditional festival held in the central Andes. The word "play" refers to either the clouds or the blossoms "playing" in the winds at the end of the rainy season and thus harvesting time. The Bolivian Pukllay is connected to the Christian carnival and the celebration of a battle won over the Spaniards – hence the appropriation of the Spanish helmets and spurs one can still see in the ritual dance.

In March 2011, Bolivia nominated the Pukllay festival in Tarabuco (including the Ayarichi dance of the Yampara people) to UNESCO for World Heritage recognition as part of the cultural and intangible heritage of humanity.
