= The Rough Guide to the Music of the Andes =

Compilation album by Various artists
- Released: 5 November 1996
- Genre: World, Andean music
- Length: 64:45
- Label: World Music Network

Full series chronology
The Rough Guide to the Music of India and Pakistan (1996)	The Rough Guide to the Music of the Andes (1996)	The Rough Guide to the Music of Zimbabwe (1996)

The Rough Guide to the Music of the Andes is a world music compilation album originally released in 1996. Part of the World Music Network Rough Guides series, the album features the music of the Andes Mountains of South America, focusing especially on the music of Bolivia, whose musicians contributed eleven tracks. Also featured are Peru (three tracks) and Chile (two tracks). The compilation was produced by Phil Stanton, co-founder of the World Music Network.

== Reception ==
Professional ratings
Review scores
Source	Rating
AllMusic	4/5 stars

Adam Greenberg of AllMusic gave the album four stars, calling it a "good starting point", containing "every style the producers can find" from the region. Michaelangelo Matos, writing for the Chicago Reader, described the release as "folkie" and "pretty", but that it should be listened to in small doses by anyone but "panpipe addicts".

== Track listing ==
No.	Title	Artist (Country)	Length
1.	"Tempestad"	Savia Andina (Bolivia)	3:04
2.	"Puedo Vivir Sin Tu Amor"	Los Kjarkas (Bolivia)	4:08
3.	"De Regresso"	Emma Junaro (Bolivia)	5:15
4.	"Atahuallpa"	Rumillajta (Bolivia)	4:47
5.	"Daniela Soledad"	Eddy Navia (Bolivia)	4:00
6.	"El Hacha"	Inti-Illimani (Chile)	5:28
7.	"Leño Verde"	Ernesto Cavour (Bolivia)	2:37
8.	"Chaquiras de Luz"	William Centellas (Bolivia)	3:34
9.	"Me Querido Potosi (Si Supieras)"	Enriqueta Ulloa (Bolivia)	3:22
10.	"Quirquinchos de Corazón"	Awatiñas (Bolivia)	4:37
11.	"Virgenes del Sol"	Fernando Jiménez (Bolivia)	3:19
12.	"Jallalla"	Jenny Cárdenas (Bolivia)	4:04
13.	"Maria Lando"	Susana Baca (Peru)	5:39
14.	"Un Pasajero en Tu Camino"	Picaflor de los Andes (Peru)	2:40
15.	"Alianza Corazón"	Orquesta Los Tarumas De Tarma (Peru)	2:38
16.	"Concepcion"	Sukay (Bolivia) (Canada) (Switzerland) (United States)	3:52
17.	"Te Recuerdo Amanda"	Victor Jara (Chile)	2:31
