= Unwired: Latin America =

Compilation album by Various artists
- Released: 23 October 2001
- Genre: World, Acoustic, Latin American
- Length: 67:21
- Label: World Music Network

Full series chronology
The Rough Guide to the Music of Nigeria & Ghana (2002)	Unwired: Latin America (2001)	The Rough Guide to the Music of Central America (2001)

Unwired: Latin America is a world music benefit compilation album originally released in 2001, with proceeds going to Amnesty International. Part of the World Music Network Rough Guides series, the release features Latin American acoustic music. The compilation was produced by Phil Stanton, co-founder of the World Music Network. Duncan Baker coordinated the project and wrote the liner notes.

Brazil is the source of four tracks, Argentina three, Cuba and Bolivia contribute two each, and Costa Rica, Belize, Peru, Chile, Colombia, and Mexico are all represented once.

== Track listing ==
No.	Title	Artist (Country)	Length
1.	"Uma Historia De Ifa"	Virginia Rodrigues (Brazil)	4:11
2.	"La Vida Es Corta"	Guadalupe Urbina (Costa Rica)	4:43
3.	"Non Dvcor Dvco (Qual a Minha Cara?)"	Thobias da Vai-Vai (Brazil)	4:27
4.	"Dente No Dente"	Jards Macalé (Brazil)	2:32
5.	"Viejo Ciego"	Roberto 'Polaco' Goyeneche (Argentina)	3:49
6.	"Moda Tango"	Néstor Marconi (Argentina)	3:24
7.	"Pedacito de Cielo"	Adriana Varela (Argentina)	3:59
8.	"Serewe"	Cecil Caliz (Belize)	3:26
9.	"Meu Drama (Senhora Tentação)"	Renato Braz (Brazil)	4:58
10.	"Cardo O Ceniza"	Julie Freundt (Peru)	3:31
11.	"La Fiesta Eres Tú"	Inti-Illimani (Chile)	4:47
12.	"Malibú"	Máximo Jiménez (Colombia)	2:50
13.	"Se Quema la Chumbambá"	La Familia Valera Miranda (Cuba)	4:58
14.	"Caballo Viejo"	Estudiantina Invasora (Cuba)	3:06
15.	"Zancudo"	Tin Tan (Mexico)	3:49
16.	"Sumac Orcko"	Rumillajta (Bolivia)	4:18
17.	"Anochecer"	Emma Junaro (Bolivia)	4:33
