= Peña Naira =

Bolivian folk music club

Peña Naira was an epoch-making folk club in La Paz, Bolivia in the years 1966–71.

Located in Sagárnaga Street, in the old commercial centre of La Paz, it was established in 1966 by Ernesto Cavour in collaboration with Gilbert Favre. These two musicians went on to form the quartet Los Jairas, which was to launch a new approach that revolutionised the practice of folk music in Bolivia and its role in society.

Before long Peña Naira became the main stage for folk music in the country, serving as a launchpad for artists and bands such as Benjo Cruz, Los Caminantes, Los Chaskas and many others. Musicians from other parts of the country also gravitated towards Naira, including Trío Oriental, Nilo Soruco and others. Chilean singer-songwriter Violeta Parra spent time working at Naira during her stormy relationship with Gilbert Favre.

The coup d'état which brought General Hugo Banzer to power in 1971 began a period of harsh repression, rendering Naira's work unsustainable.
