= Kantu =

Ancient circle dance of the Bolivian and Peruvian highlands

Traditional k'antu from Bolivia,
(MIDI sample)
as played by Inkuyo group
(Art from Sacred Landscapes, 1998)

Kantu or k'antu is an ancient style of music and circle dance which is widespread since incaic or even preincaic epoch on the Peruvian and Bolivian highlands. Modern versions of this style still use the Quechua or Aymara language and the siku (ceremonial panpipe). Some musicologists argue that the name for this style comes from the Spanish word 'canto' meaning 'song.' Linguists might argue that the name comes from the Quechua word 'k'antu' which is a widely known flower in Bolivia. Also, k'antu may be a word of extinct Puquina language with unknown meaning.

== Dancing ==
K'antu is a circle dance, but some women and men also dance in pairs inside or outside of the circle.

== Resources ==
For recorded version of the k'antu songs, please refer to Worlds of Music listed as a reference.

== Some examples ==
There is a variety of bands who play the Kantu style, such as:

- Los Kjarkas
- Inkuyo
- Bolivia Manta
- Grupo Aymara
- Awatiñas
- Markasata
- K'antu Ensemble an award-winning ensemble from Birmingham
