= Alborada (Perú) =

Peruvian Andean music band

Background information
- Origin: Ocobamba, Peru
- Genres: Andean music, world music, new age, folk
- Years active: 1984–present
- Labels: Planeta Libre Records; Piros; BMC Records; Edivox
- Members: Sixto Ayvar (Atuq); Reinszo Pandal (Chirapaq); Wilber Ayvar (Puma Qawaq); Adrian Vargas (Malllku)
- Past members: Lenin De La Torre (Allin Qampy); Víctor Valle (Tatanqa)
- Website: https://www.facebook.com/alboradamusic/

Alborada is a Peruvian group of Andean music and contemporary music created in 1984.

Alborada is considered one of the Peruvian exponents of world music due to their combinations of contemporary styles and because its members settled mainly in Germany. Most of their songs are performed in Quechua. The leading instruments are Andean wind instruments such as quenas, toyos, zampoñas, sikus, and antaras, combined with more modern instruments like the electric guitar.

== History ==
The group's history begins in 1984 when Sixto Ayvar founded Alborada in his hometown, Ocobamba. Before this, the nickname Sixtucha developed in the city of Cologne, musical concepts of the original cultures of the Peruvian Andes in Germany. There his musical ear was enriched by other genres and styles of that cosmopolitan city and endowed with different miscellaneous sounds and instruments.

At that time traditional Andean music, in the hands and voices of Alborada, modernizes, renews, and adapts to the new and demanding ears of the current public outside the Peruvian territory. In the early years, it had fundamental support from recognized performers Manuelcha Prado and Julio Humala.

During its formation other names passed through Alborada with different experiences and nationalities. Different musical forms were experimented with, but always with their particular and characteristic style. From the strictly traditional, through fusion, to music for meditative purposes. In the Tropical production, they approach more danceable and contemporary rhythms, while the Melodías del Corazón and Melodías Inolvidables series explore popular Western rhythms. Meanwhile, in the albums Caminos al Sol and Instrumental, the group's rapid and progressive changes are appreciated with other modern instruments like the electric guitar.

With the arrival of Argentinian Víctor Valle and the Ecuadorian Lenin de la Torre, the characteristic sound of Alborada was created. The new styles and rhythms they bring from their respective communities, combined with the experiences they gained from visiting indigenous cultures in Canada and the United States. These new experiences are evident from their Meditation production. In this extrasensory proposal, they planned to create "intercultural bridges" between human groups distanced by history. Alborada proposed their folk music as a medium, which, beyond recovering original sounds from pre-Columbian peoples, contributed their own for the continent's cosmopolitan style. This musical philosophy of Alborada is shared by similar groups: Indiógenes, Sol y Luna, and Ocobamba.

Although Alborada participated alongside other international groups like the Bolivians "Savia Andina" and "Los Kjarkas," they achieved worldwide recognition with the worldwide diffusion of their DVD "Alborada Live". This DVD was subtitled in English, Quechua, and Spanish, reflecting the cosmopolitan nature of their audience.

== Members ==
- Sixto Ayvar (founder)
- Reinszo Pandal
- Víctor Valle
- Wilber Ayvar

== Discography ==
- 1986: El canto del puma
- 1988: Madre tierra
- 1993: Runa
- 1997: Kuntur
- 1998: Kuyayky
- 2000: Jiwaña
- 2002: Sumaq Kawsay
- 2003: Tropical
- 2003: Instrumental
- 2003: Taki
- 2004: Nuna
- 2004: Apu
- 2004: Reencuentro
- 2005: Madre Tierra
- 2005: Kuyayky II
- 2005: Reincarnación
- 2005: Antología
- 2006: Concierto desde Alemania
- 2007: Danza de los negros
- 2007: Nina
- 2008: Fiesta
- 2008: Misk'i Takiy
- 2009: Concierto desde México
- 2009: Los sueños de mi madre
- 2010: Concierto en México
- 2010: Concierto en Lima
- 2011: Cantos de Tierra y Semilla
- 2012: Caminos al Sol
- 2013: Concierto en Chile
- 2013: Kay Pacha
- 2014: Melodías del Corazón
- 2015: Qullasuyu
