= Kuyayky =

- Origin: Jauja, Peru
- Genres: World Music, Huayno, Andean
- Years active: 1980–present
- Past members: Jose Hurtado Zamudio, Edda Bonilla Peña, Rubi Hurtado Bonilla, Jose Luis Hurtado Bonilla, Yina Hurtado Bonilla, Mariluz Hurtado Bonilla, Candy Hurtado Bonilla

Kuyayky is one of the most popular and newly influential bands in Andean music. The band has contributed to the prominence and revival of huayno music from central Peru. One of the few Andean music bands with a majority of female members. The band now resides in the United States and gained a following from world music fans for its traditional yet innovative style of Peruvian Music.

Kuyayky has struck a chord by rearranging and researching dozens of musical pieces from the precolonial and colonial periods in Latin America, but have retained a clear emphasis on the music of central Peru. They are part of the Xauxa ayllu of the Bonilla family.

== History ==
Kuyayky was founded by ethnomusicologist Jose Hurtado Zamudio and singer/composer Edda Bonilla Peña of the Conjunto de Alma Jaujina, in 1980 in the town of Jauja. Kuyayky's original members are the Hurtado Bonilla siblings: Rubi Indira in guitar and first voice, Jose Luis in the mandolin and fourth voice, Yina in the charango and second voice, Mariluz in the quena, sikus, cajón and third voice, and Candy in the bombo leguero and first voice. They have been known to collaborate with different musicians in distinct musical genres including jazz, bluegrass, rock, punk rock and folk music from Europe and Latin America.

Kuyayky also founded the Kuyayky Foundation a non-governmental organization that fosters cultural awareness through the research, promotion and development of Andean music and culture. Their work has been recognized by diverse institutions including the Inter-American Development Bank and the Smithsonian Institution.

The band takes its name from the Quechua language, which translates from the verb "kuyay" love, meaning "to love" or "solidarity".

In November 2006, the release of Kuyayky's new album was featured in an investigative report by Enrique Flor of Peruvian television newsmagazine La Ventana Indiscreta on Frecuencia Latina.
