= Music of Bolivia =

The music of Bolivia has a long history. Out of all the Andean countries, Bolivia remains perhaps the most culturally linked to the indigenous peoples.

== History ==
Like most of its neighbors, Bolivia was long dominated by Spain and its attendant culture. Even after independence, Bolivian music was largely based on European forms. In 1952, a revolution established nationalistic reforms which included cultural and political awareness of the Aymara and Quechua natives. Intellectuals in the country began wearing ponchos and otherwise associating themselves with native cultures, and the new government promoted native folklore by, among other methods, establishing a folklore department in the Bolivian Ministry of Education.

Awareness of native music, spirituality and art continued into the 1960s. In 1965, Edgar 'Yayo' Jofré formed a quartet called Los Jairas in La Paz. With Bolivian folk music gaining popularity throughout the country, Jofré, along with Alfredo Dominguez, Ernesto Cavour, Julio Godoy, and Gilbert Favre used traditional music in modified forms to appeal to urban-dwellers and Europeans. Later groups like Wara, Khanata, Paja Brava (1977–2000), Savia Andina, and especially Los Kjarkas and Kalamarka helped further refine this fusion. Following a close but different path, groups and singers like Luzmila Carpio, Ruphay, and Grupo Aymara started touring abroad and gained international praise for their compositions, tunes that have brought indigenous Bolivian culture and history to the world's attention.

Los K'jarkas consists of 3 brothers, the Hermosas, who play primarily Huayño or, more rarely, sayas. These are both dance music influenced both by native forms as well as African music imported to Bolivia with slavery. Los K'jarkas are known internationally for their Caporales classic "Llorando se fue", which was adopted and transformed to the popular beginning of the lambada dance craze of the 1980s, along with forró and carimbo in northern Brazil. The song was popularized by a French group, resulting in a successful lawsuit from the Hermosa brothers. Kalamarka was founded in 1984 by Hugo Gutierrez and Rodolfo Choque. They fusion folk instruments such as Zampoña, Quena, Charango and Bombo with modern instruments, creating a beautiful Andean music. Their famous songs are 'Cuando Florezca el Chuño' and 'Ama, Ama, Amazonas'. In the 1980s, Chilean nueva canción was imported to Bolivia and changed into canto nuevo, which was popularized by performers like Emma Junaro.

Traditional Bolivian (and other South American) musical instruments include the charango, charangón, ronroco, hualaycho, zampoña, quena, bombo, huancara, reco reco, chiapya box, pinquillo, tarka, toyos, pututu, Andean saxophone, and Chajchas, as well as European musical instruments such as the violin and guitar.

Most prominent Bolivian musical forms identified in its culture and origins are the Kullawada, Morenada, Caporales, Llamerada, Diablada, Tonada (or, directly Tinku), Sikuri, Tarqueada, Taquirari, Carnavalito, Bailecito, Huayño, Lamento, Afro-Bolivian Saya, Tuntuna, Taki Taki, Waca Tocoris, Chovena, Sarao, Potolos, Pujllay, Danza Salay, Rueda Chapaca, Chacarera, Escondido, Tonada, Ch'unchu (dance), Tobas and Cueca which presents different variants in each Bolivian department.
