= Los Jairas =

Bolivian musical group

- Origin: Bolivia
- Genres: Andean folk
- Years active: 1965–?
- Past members: Ernesto Cavour, Edgar Joffré, Julio Godoy, Gilbert Favre, Alfredo Dominguez
- Website: losjairas.com

Los Jairas was a Bolivian folk music group that was active in the 1960s. Their work features the charango, a stringed instrument from Bolivia.

World Music wrote that "In Bolivia innumerable groups have followed the Los Jairas model. Among the more prominent — through tours or recordings — are Los K'jarkas, Savia Andina, Khanata, Los Quipus, Wara, Los Yuras, Grupo Aymara and Paja Brava."

Los Jairas formed in 1965 by Edgar 'Yayo' Jofré, who brought the group together to play at Pena Naira.

One of the early members was Gilbert Favre, founder of the folklore cabaret La Pena Naira in La Paz.

Members of the band:

- Ernesto Cavour - charango
- Edgar Joffré - voice, drums, zampoña (also called sicu)
- Julio Godoy
- Gilbert Favre - quena (kena)

Favre was a Swiss jazz player who played the quena with great skill and sensitivity.

On several of their albums, they featured Alfredo Dominguez, one of the finest Bolivian guitar players who wrote and composed many songs. His appearance on the album Grito de Bolivia was the highlights of Los Jairas' research into neo-folklore.

Michelle Bigenho wrote in Intimate Distance that

Los Jairas, an ensemble founded in the mid-1960s... completely transformed the performance styles of Bolivian music. Its practical size—four members—facilitated international touring, and the attention brought to it by foreigners finally made Bolivians take serious notice of what could be played on those instruments that were considered previously as just "cosas de indios" (indian things). When Los Jairas appeared on the Bolivian music scene, they built on the ongoing process of folklorizing indigenous musical expressions, developing virtuosity on the iconic "Andean" instruments of quena, zampoña, and charango. They were one of the first nationally and internationally successful small Bolivian bands that performed what has been called the "Pan-Andean" style.

Gilka Cespedes wrote that Los Jairas

was formed by Ernesto Cavour, an extraordinary charango player; Edgar Jofre, singer and percussionist; J. Godoy, guitarist; and the French/Swiss Gilbert Favre, the kena player of the group. Later, they were joined by Alfredo Dominguez, an equally extraordinary guitar player and composer. The standard ensemble consisted of kena, guitar, charango, and bombo.

Cavour and Dominguez... created a vast repertoire that provided a new orientation and model for the many groups of imitators who followed Los Jairas. The floodgates of a new idiom had been opened, although in the case of Los Jairas it limited itself to the arranging of items in which Favre's and Cavour's brilliance could be displayed. They played pieces of the traditional repertoire, and the emphasis was strongly placed on the kena. Vocal melodies would be entrusted solely to the kena, which played either solo or in thirds with a second kena... Favre's technique included a vibrato, a voluminous sound with a wide range of dynamic changes, a ubiquitous glissando between intervals a third or more apart, a distinctive phrasing, and a personal "signature," which was the raising of the last note of a phrase by a minimal pitch, thus creating a "tail," as it were. Planned or accidental, this feature was imitated by other groups. Los Jairas also reinterpreted pieces of indigenous origin such as sicureadas, by re-elaborating the panpipe melody into a single kena solo, followed at the second turn by another kena a third apart, thus altering considerably the very essence of sicu music. The charango as a virtuoso instrument was emphasized as well, and Cavour composed many pieces in which the different timbres of the instrument receive special attention. Los Jairas created songs that are now classics, such as "El llanto de mi madre," "Alborozo kolla," and others popularized abroad, such as "El condor pasa."

Fernando Rios wrote that

Los Jairas... highlighted the kena more than the charango. This probably had been Favre's idea... Favre, formerly a Dixieland jazz clarinetist, took up the kena in the early 1960s when he was living in Europe (he moved to Bolivia in 1966), where he heard the sound of the instrument for the first time through the playing of the Paris-based Argentine soloists Carlos Ben-Pott, Ricardo Galeazzi, and Alfredo de Robertis. In France's Andean music milieu of the 1960s, a scene dominated by the Argentine-led conjuntos Los Incas and Los Calchakis, the kenistas normally occupied the main soloist role... an approach that Bolivia's Los Jairas adopted.

World Music wrote that

Around 1965 an influential - and indeed definitive - musical model for the Andes emerged with Los Jairas.... The idea was to form a quartet of charango (Bolivian mandolin), guitar, quena and bombo (drum): instruments that had never been played together before, having had their own seasons in the mountain villages. The quartet arranged the music to show off each of the instruments' solo and group possibilities.... they forged a new melodic and rhythmic style...

== Partial discography ==
- Los Jairas
- Edgar Joffre - Los Jairas
- Grito de Bolivia- Los Jairas (1967)
- Sempre con...Los Jairas (1969)
- Edgar "Yayo" Joffre y Los Jairas (1969)
- La Flute Des Andes (1970)
- Lo Mejor de los Jairas (1974)
- Los Jairas en vivo (1976)
- Canto a la viva (1978)
- Al Pueblo de mis Ancestros (1992)
