= Picaflor de los Andes =

Picaflor de Los Andes
- Also known as: El Picaflor de Los Andes
- Born: Víctor Alberto Gil Mallma; 1928; Huancayo
- Origin: Peru
- Died: July 14, 1975 (aged 44-45) La Oroya
- Genres: Huayno, Huaylas, Muliza
- Occupation: Singer
- Formerly of: Flor Pucarina, Pastorita Huaracina

Víctor Alberto Gil Mallma (April 8, 1928 in Huancayo – July 14, 1975 in La Oroya), better known as Picaflor de Los Andes, was a Peruvian folk singer. In his childhood, he worked as a driver, painter, construction worker, and bricklayer. He sold approximately 80,000 copies of the single "Corazón mañoso" in 1960, thereby becoming a cultural icon and obtaining the name "Picaflor de los Andes".

He died on July 14, 1975, in the district of La Oroya; there were more than 100,000 people at his burial.

== Discography ==
Albums

- El Genio del Huaytapallana
- Por las rutas del recuerdo
- Santísima virgen de Cocharcas
- Un paso mas en la vida
- Yo soy huancaíno
- Bodas de Plata
- Un pasajero en el camino

Contributing artist

- The Rough Guide to the Music of the Andes (1996, World Music Network)
