= Alborada =

Alborada may refer to:

- Aubade, a song or poem concerning daybreak (alborada in Spanish)
- Alborada (TV series), a Mexican telenovela
- Alborada (horse) a British thoroughbred racehorse
- Alborada (film), a multilingual Sri Lankan film by Asoka Handagama about the life of Pablo Neruda
- Alborada (Perú), a Peruvian Andean music band
- Alborada, Jaltenco, State of Mexico

== See also ==
- "Alborada del gracioso", a piece for solo piano by Maurice Ravel
