= Guadalupe Urbina =

Costa Rican singer-songwriter

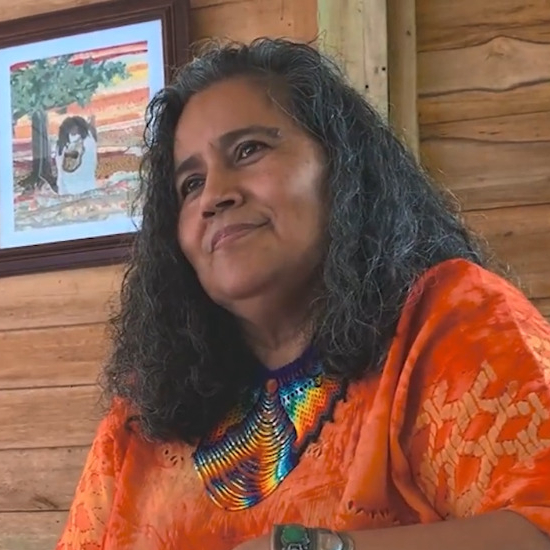
- Born: Simona María Guadalupe Urbina-Juárez; October 28, 1959 (age 66); Sardinal, Guanacaste, Costa Rica
- Occupation: Singer-songwriter
- Musical career
- Genres: Folk music
- Instruments: Vocals; guitar
- Website: guadalupeurbina.org

Guadalupe Urbina (born 28 October 1959) is a Costa Rican singer-songwriter, poet, and activist. Urbina is a folk musician whose compositions reflect the oral tradition of Guanacaste, her birthplace. She has performed in both Europe and the United States and has won various awards for her work domestically and internationally.

== Biography ==
=== Early life ===
Guadalupe Urbina was born 28 October 1959 in Sardinal, Guanacaste, Costa Rica, as the youngest of ten children of Nicaraguan immigrants. She was born into a rural household in a town with no electricity and did not own shoes until she was eleven years old.

Born into a musical family, both of Urbina's parents played and sung music at home. Urbina recalls learning the traditional tales that she would perform through her career from her mother, Ángela Juárez, during her childhood. Local radio broadcast rancheras and other songs by Víctor Manuel and Joan Manuel Serrat, which Urbina would listen to on a battery-powered radio. By the time she was eight years old, she was a frequent performer at family events, possessing a large repertoire that she had learned from her mother or heard on the radio.

When she was eleven years old, her mother died, and she was sent to San José to live with her older sisters. Urbina learned to play guitar at sixteen years old, and began to hone her skills as a poet and singer-songwriter. Soon after, she attended the National University of Costa Rica in Heredia to study music and guitar, during which she won first prize at the university song festival two years in a row.

=== Early career and residence abroad (1980s–2000s) ===
Urbina recorded various cassette recordings in the 1980s of which there is little record. Her first appearance on an LP record was in the 1986 compilation album La Paz del Mundo comienza en Centroamérica. The following year, Urbina performed at the Latin American Music Festival in Utrecht, Netherlands, through which she received an invitation to perform at a concert within Amnesty International's Human Rights Now! tour in 1988. Held at the Estadio Nacional de Costa Rica, Urbina shared the stage with musicians Youssou N'Dour, Sting, Peter Gabriel, Tracy Chapman, and Bruce Springsteen. By the end of the decade, Urbina had toured internationally and performed in venues in Spain, Senegal, France, Canada, and the United States.

In 1994, Urbina was presented with a Gaviota award from the Círculo de Bellas Artes in Madrid, Spain, for her work with oral tradition. A year later, she was presented with Radio France's American Discovery Award by Youssou N'Dour. Urbina moved to the Netherlands in the mid-1990s. She continued composing music, combining her own compositions with the traditional songs of Guanacaste folklore that she encountered in her research. Under a government scholarship, Urbina refined her singing technique and practiced with percussion instruments. She also taught in workshops alongside musicians Angélique Kidjo, Bobby McFerrin, and Mari Boine.

While living in Europe, Urbina returned to Costa Rica for several months each year to teach children stories related to their cultural identity. In 1999, Urbina founded Voz Propia, an organization in Costa Rica which supports the development of the arts in young people. Further along her stay in the Netherlands, in 2000, she began dabbling in drawing by illustrating stories that she wrote while raising her daughter. Urbina released her 2001 album Trópico Azul De Lluvia under Belgian-Dutch world music label Culture Records. One of the album's songs, "Agosto Azul", was included on The Rough Guide to the Music of Central America and was praised in a review by RootsWorld magazine: those "...who miss the exquisite poetry and visionary yearning of revolutionary Central American trova will welcome this subtle recording." Putumayo World Music, a world music label, also included her music on their album Garden of Eden (2001). Urbina presented her children's book Benito, Pánfila y el perro garrobero, illustrated by Gabriela Cob, at the Centro Nacional de Cultura (National Cultural Center) in December 2002. The book covers the adventures of a girl growing up on a farm in Guanacaste.

=== Health issues and return to Costa Rica (2000s–2010s) ===
Urbina was diagnosed with brain cancer in 2002. After returning to the Netherlands after receiving treatment in Belgium, the Dutch government told her that she was disabled and could not work anymore. She returned to Costa Rica, and soon after continued her creative work, including writing a musical, alongside her work with Voz Propia. The book Al Menudeo, in which Urbina compiled stories, songs, poems, myths, and prayers, was published in 2003 in Spain by publisher Horas y Horas. Urbina and journalist María Suárez Toro were granted a scholarship by the GAEA Foundation in 2006 in recognition of their "notable work to explore and develop alternative social realities that promote justice, creativity and sustainability". The scholarship was given to support a two-month residency the following year in Massachusetts, United States, to write a theatrical production, entitled Wings of the Butterfly, based on Suárez's doctoral thesis. Twenty-five of Urbina's paintings were showcased in a 2009 exhibition at the Museo Nacional de Costa Rica titled Los Colores de Guadalupe Urbina. Urbina based her paintings on Mayan stories, taking inspiration from Pop Wuj, and created them by utilizing acrylic, oil, pencil, and collage on recycled papers made from mango fibers, tobacco, tamarind and rice.

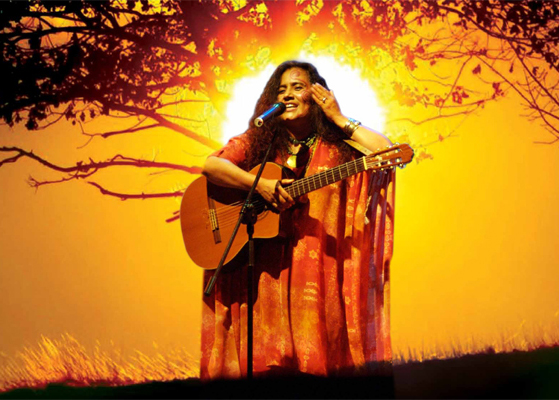
Urbina performing in 2010

In 2011, Urbina published the song book Sones de mi Tierra Caliente comprising unpublished and anonymous songs of the Guanacaste province, and performed the songs at a concert at the National Theatre of Costa Rica. The song book was a result of research Urbina had conducted on the oral tradition of Guanacaste starting in 1984, during which she collected hundreds of songs using grants from ACAM and the Spanish Cultural Center. After receiving treatment and recovering from a third tumor, Urbina moved to Longo Maï, an agricultural cooperative located between the Costa Rican cantons of Pérez Zeledón and Buenos Aires, to rest at 2011 due to poor health. A concert dedicated to supporting Urbina while she was ill was organized in San Isidro in 2012.

=== Continued activism and recognition (2010s–present) ===
During the 2014 Costa Rican general election, Urbina announced her support of presidential candidate José María Villalta, of the Broad Front. Later that year she published the book Palabras de Larga Noche, her first work of poetry. Ahead of the 2018 Costa Rican general election, Urbina supported Broad Front candidate Edgardo Araya Sibaja. Later that year, the Association of Composers and Authors of Costa Rica (ACAM) recognized Urbina for her compilation of works, Sones Afromestizos de Amor y de Humor (2016). A series of stamps dedicated to national musicians, featuring Urbina and musicians Amelia Barquero, José Capmany, and Fidel Gamboa, were promoted by ACAM and endorsed by the national postal service Correos de Costa Rica that year.

Urbina participated in a campaign organized by the Inter-American Institute for Cooperation on Agriculture to honor food industry workers working through the 2020 coronavirus pandemic. Later that month, ACAM presented Urbina with its Premio Reca Mora award, citing her lifetime dedication to music as well as the influence and importance of her musical legacy.

On a February 2021 broadcast by the Kioscos Socioambientales program of the University of Costa Rica, Urbina delivered a statement with program director Mauricio Álvarez and activist Osvaldo Durán that denounced the "impunity for crimes against indigenous people", and specifically spoke about the murder of Bribri leader Sergio Rojas and perceived inaction by the state. The statement was signed by seventy five national and international organizations and more than one hundred twenty individuals, including academics and activists. One year after the murder of land activist Yehry Rivera on 24 February 2020, Urbina and the Orquesta de las Selvas Tropicales (Orchestra of the Tropical Rainforests) published an adaptation of León Gieco's "Cinco Siglos Igual" as a tribute to the efforts of Indigenous communities in protecting their land rights and traditions.

== Artistry ==
According to musician and professor Juan Carlos Ureña, Urbina's songs "reflect the force of her land and people and the sounds and traditions of Guanacaste folklore." Urbina says that her musical repertoire can comprise more than one hundred songs at one time, something she considers normal for her musical experience. Urbina has also written dozens of songs — her song "Vengo de una Tierra" ("I Come from a Land"), about hailing "from a burning hot land that is only for one people who know how to feel and who want to live", is one song that she says is most liked by Guanacastecans. Within her works, Urbina often references the unique qualities of Guanacaste's people and utilizes metaphors to symbolize the province itself. She has also incorporated aspects of African heritage into her music.

Urbina has produced feminist works. Since 1991, she has been involved in various stage productions centered on the history of Latin American women.

== Personal life ==
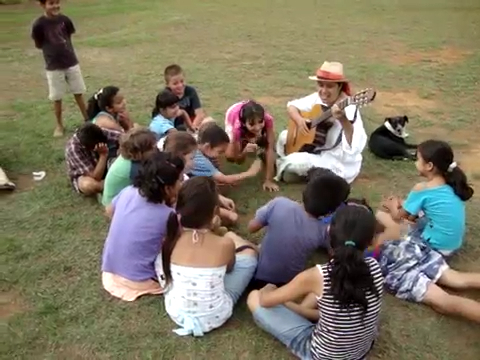
Urbina singing with children at the Longo Maï cooperative in Costa Rica

Urbina owns a farm in the agricultural cooperative of Longo Maï, between the Costa Rican cantons of Pérez Zeledón and Buenos Aires. She also spends time with her two children who live south of San José.

=== Media coverage ===
Urbina is the subject of the 2019 documentary film Los caminos del amor, which covers her life and work.

== Works ==
=== Albums ===
- Romances de allá y de acá vol. 3 (1989, with Joaquín Díaz)
- 100 Varas al Sur del Herediano (1995, with Callejeros)
- Homenaje a la Madre Tierra, en vivo desde el Teatro Fanal (1995)
- De Todos Modos (1996, with Callejeros)
- Trópico Azul de Lluvia (2002)
- La madremonte, ritmos cuentos y canciones. Infantil. (2002)
- Al Menudeo (2003)
- Sones de Tierra Caliente (2011)
- Mis Canciones Que Te Gustan (compilation album, 2012)
- Cantos Simples del Amor de la Tierra (2016)
- Sones Afromestizos de Amor y de Humor (2016)

=== Books ===
- Benito, Pánfila y el perro garrobero. Costa Rica: Cosmovisiones Multimedia. 2002.
- Al Menudeo. Madrid: Editorial Horas y Horas. 2003. ISBN 9788496004016.
- Palabras de Larga Noche. San José: Uruk Editores. 2014. ISBN 9789968664769.
