= Hocket =

Musical technique

In music, hocket is a rhythmic and linear technique involving the alternation of notes, pitches, or chords. In medieval practice, a single melody is shared between two (or occasionally more) voices such that one voice sounds while the other rests, creating a staggered, interlocking texture.

== History ==
In European music, hocket (or hoquet) was prominent in vocal and choral compositions of the 13th and early 14th centuries. It was a defining feature of the Notre Dame school during the ars antiqua period, appearing in sacred vocal music and string compositions. By the 14th century, it was more common in secular vocal music. Though the term originates in medieval French motets, similar techniques appear globally under different names.

In seculum

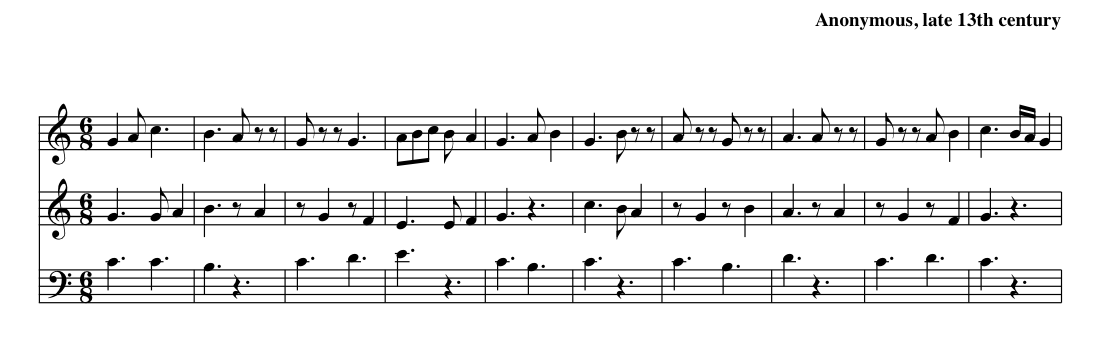
Example of hocket (In seculum d'Amiens longum), French, late 13th century. Observe the quick alternation of sung notes and rests between the upper two voices. While this example is textless, the hocket was usually done on a vowel sound.

The technique remains in use in contemporary music. Examples include Louis Andriessen's Hoketus; funk and stereo panning in American popular music; guitar duos like Robert Fripp/Adrian Belew in King Crimson and Tom Verlaine/Richard Lloyd in Television; gamelan music in Indonesia (imbal in Java, kotekan in Bali); Andean siku ensembles; Ukrainian and Russian kuvytsi, Lithuanian skudučiai; handbell music; rara music in Haiti and gagá in the Dominican Republic.

Hocketing is also found in African traditions such as the Ba-Benzélé (featured on Herbie Hancock's "Watermelon Man", see Pygmy music), Mbuti, Basarwa (Khoisan), the Gumuz tribe of Sudan, and the Gogo of Tanzania. In drum and bugle corps, it appears as "split parts" or "splits". Duke Ellington's "Braggin' in Brass" includes a rare jazz example.

A sikuri, a traditional Andean music form, is played in hocket. Computer-generated file.

Contemporary artists often integrate hocketing with other compositional techniques, such as alternating melodies, interlocking patterns, and stereo separation. While the term hoquet is antiquated, its principles are widely adapted in modern music production and performance.

The group Dirty Projectors prominently use hocketing in both instrumental and vocal arrangements. Frontman Dave Longstreth has expressed fascination with the medieval origins of these experimental techniques.

== Etymology ==
The term derives from the French hoquet (also hocquet, hoket, or ocquet in Old French), meaning "shock, sudden interruption, hitch, hiccup". Related onomatopoeic terms appear in Celtic, Breton, and Dutch. Latinized forms include hoquetus, (h)oketus, and (h)ochetus. Earlier theories of Arabic origin are no longer favored.

== See also ==
- Bigwala, ceremonial music from Uganda
- Kecak, Balinese performance piece also known as the Ramayana Monkey Chant
- Klangfarbenmelodie
- Melodic fission
