= Ojos azules (song) =

Song

"Ojos azules" is a song written in 1947 by Bolivian composer Gilberto Rojas Enriquez. It has since become an Andean music standard, performed by artists from Bolivia, Peru, Chile, and Argentina.

Some sources say that it is ultimately of Peruvian origin, either written by Peruvian songwriter Manuel Casazola Huancco, or adapted from a huayno song from Cusco called "Ojos bonitos" ("Pretty Eyes").

== Structure and content ==
Ojos Azules" was written by Gilberto Rojas Enriquez in Bolivia in 1945. The song's structure is in 2/4 and 3/8 time in the key of A minor, using the seventh variations typical of Bolivian writers such as Simeón Roncal, Alberto Ruiz Lavadenz, Jose Lavadenz, and Teófilo Vargas. The song was originally written not in the "Huayño" rhythm but in "Taquirari" (an eastern Bolivian rhythm).

== History ==
After being recorded, the song was played in all the cities of Bolivia; it is recorded that "El Duo las Kantutas" was the favorite group in that country and without a doubt this fame also reached Peru, since at that time in the south of Peru Bolivian radios, such as Radio Illimani and Panamericana were the preferred ones by the southern Peruvians, from then on in the 1950s and onwards the melody would not be forgotten and would pass into the popular musical heritage of Chile, Peru and Bolivia.

Although Gilberto Rojas Enriquez registered the song with the SADAIC (the Argentine Society of Authors and Composers, a performance rights organisation) in 1951, it has been suggested that it is based on a Peruvian folk song.

This song, which is also interpreted as a huayno was misattributed to the Peruvian Manuel Casazola Huancco, and was presented as a song from Northern Chile by the singer Violeta Parra during her concert in Geneva in 1965.

According to Josafat Roel Pineda's book El wayno del Cusco, published in 1959, the origin of this song is found in the traditional Cusco huayno "Ojos bonitos", the two paragraphs of the huayno were recorded by a Cusco informant who gave the author a list of huaynos that he remembered from his childhood and that he had transcribed since 1915.
