= Jorge Bravo de Rueda =

Peruvian pianist and composer

Jorge Bravo de Rueda (September 13, 1895 – November 22, 1940) was a Peruvian pianist and composer.

== Biography ==
He was born in Chancay, Peru.

Inspired by the huaynos of Andean music, he composed the internationally popular tune for guitar and pan flutes "Vírgenes del Sol" (sometimes erroneously "Virgines del Sol", meaning: Virgins of the Sun): possibly the second best-known Peruvian song worldwide after "El Cóndor Pasa", it was covered by dozens of interpreters, among others Yma Súmac, Los Calchakis, and Los Chacos. As of 2006, the Congress of Peru has a project for a "Universidad Nacional Jorge Bravo de Rueda Querol" named in his honor.

He died in the Rímac District of Lima, Peru.
