= Jaime Guardia =

Peruvian singer and charango player (1933–2018)

Jaime Guillermo Guardia Neyra (10 February 1933 – 16 July 2018) was a Peruvian singer and charango player. Considered a master of the Ayacucho regional style of traditional Andean music, he performed and recorded as a solo act and with the group Lira Paucina. He was born in Pauza, Parinacochas Province, department of Ayacucho.

== Collaboration with Manuelcha Prado ==
When Manuelcha Prado reached Lima he searched pampas and mountains to listen to the wise advice of Jaime Guardia as a popular artist. Manuelcha Prado recalls: "He has always been a guide for all traditional music artist and has showed warmth to everyone". A modest Jaime Guardia said that he had not done anything, that only showed how little he knew: "I have never refused to give what little I know.
