= Violeta Went to Heaven =

2011 film

- Theatrical release poster
- Directed by: Andrés Wood
- Screenplay by: Eliseo Altunaga
- Based on: Violeta se fue a los cielos by Ángel Parra
- Produced by: Patricio Pereira
- Starring: Francisca Gavilán
- Cinematography: Miguel Abal Miguel Ioann Littin Menz
- Edited by: Andrea Chignoli
- Release date: 11 August 2011
- Running time: 110 minutes
- Country: Chile
- Language: Spanish
- Box office: $1,466,032

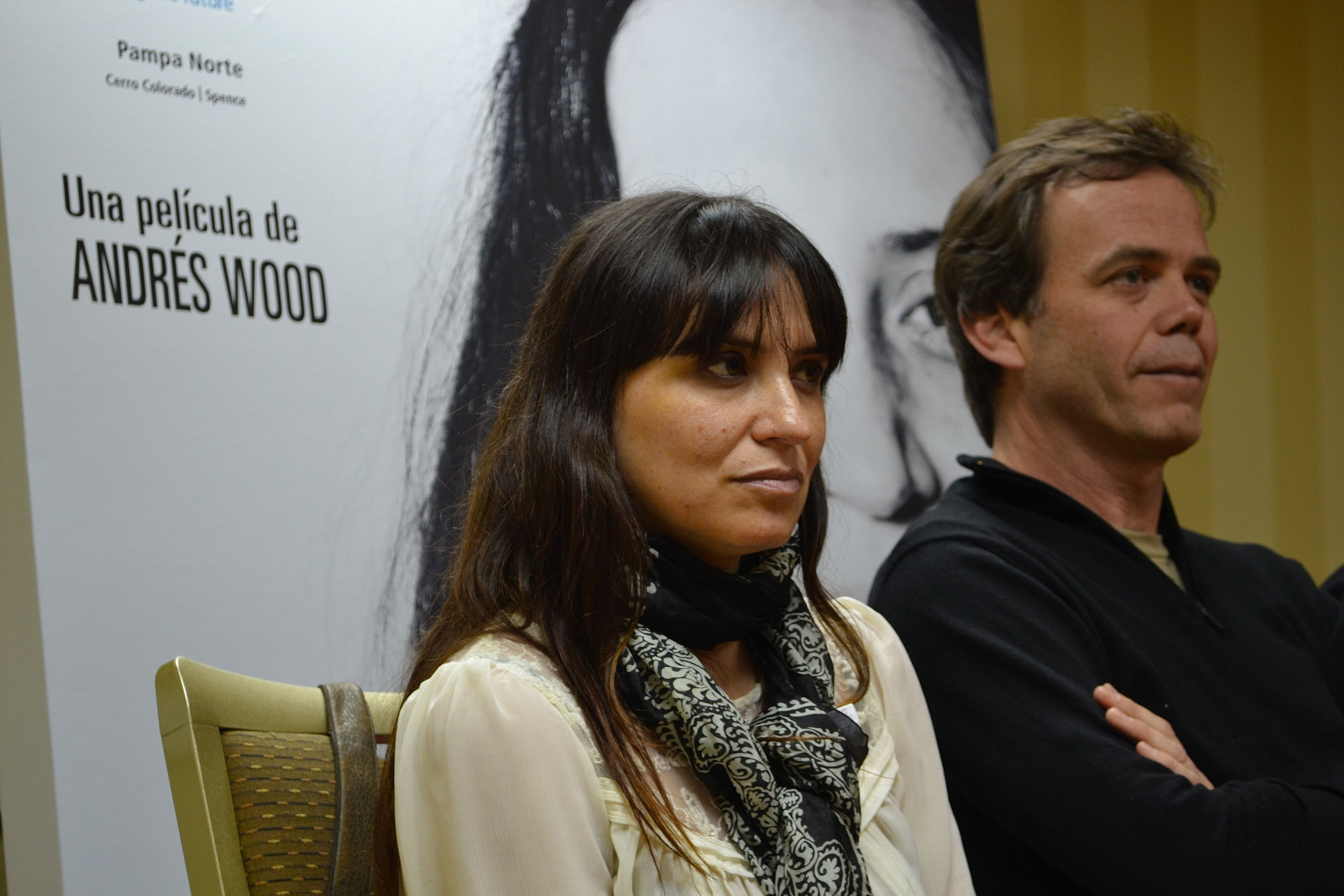
Francisca Gavilán and Andrés Wood.

Violeta Went to Heaven (Spanish: Violeta se fue a los cielos) is a 2011 Chilean biographical drama film about singer and folklorist Violeta Parra, directed by Andrés Wood. The film is based on a biography by Ángel Parra, Violeta's son with Luis Cereceda Arenas. He collaborated on the film.

The film was selected as the Chilean entry for the Best Foreign Language Film at the 84th Academy Awards, but it did not make the final shortlist. It was awarded the World Cinema Jury Prize (Dramatic) at the 2012 Sundance Film Festival.

== Plot ==
The film portrays the life of Violeta del Carmen Parra Sandoval and her path to becoming one of Chile's most renowned folklorists and artists. It details her early guitar playing, the influence of her musician father, and her experiences in the rural areas of southern Chile's Ñuble Province.

The film follows Parra's project to study Chilean folk music, with the aim of preserving and reinterpreting traditional composition styles to create the genre now known as Nueva Canción Chilena. It shows her seeking out old musicians and requesting them to sing or play the songs they knew.

The film covers her travels to Warsaw, Poland, and Paris, France, where she performed and visited parts of Europe and the Soviet Union. It also portrays the events in Chile leading up to the tragic death of her daughter Rosita during her absence.

The film explores Parra's tumultuous relationship with Swiss flautist Gilbert Favre, whom she met when he accompanied an anthropologist specializing in Chilean folklore to Chile. It follows her artistic diversification, including her oil painting and mixed-media tapestry called arpilleras or Hessian. The film also follows Parra and Favre's stay in Geneva and Paris, including her visit to the Musée du Louvre, where she became the first Latin American woman to have a solo exhibition.

Upon their return to South America, Favre and Parra separated, as he wanted to live in Bolivia, where he was part of a successful Bolivian music group, Los Jairas. Parra focused her energy on reviving a unique version of a Peña, a community center for the arts and political activism. She set up her tent on a 30x30 meter piece of land in the Parque La Quintrala in today's La Reina municipality of Santiago, in the area once known as la Cañada. The tent hosted musical events and political activism, and Parra and her children lived on the same land. The film chronicles her dealings with Fernando Castillo Velasco, the mayor of the area at the time, who helped her establish the site. Favre later returns with his group but declines to stay, and Parra humbly begs him to remain, but he had already established a life and married in Bolivia.

The film depicts the changing atmosphere of the tent, at times lively with artists during the day and music and political activism at night, and at other times desolate or too rainy and cold to be hospitable, leaving Parra suffering from poverty and loneliness.

The film concludes with Parra's suicide on February 5, 1967.

== Cast ==
- Francisca Gavilán as Violeta Parra
- Gabriela Aguilera as Hilda Parra
- Daniel Antivilo as Sr. Mayer
- Stephania Barbagelata as Carmen Luisa
- Eduardo Burlé
- Pablo Costabal
- Juan Quezada as Don Guillermo
- Sergio Piña as Mario
- Cristián Quevedo as Nicanor Parra
- Francisco Acuña as the young Nicanor Parra
- Thomas Durand as Gilbert Favre
- Roberto Farías as Luis Arce
- Vanesa González as Blonde Model
- Luis Machín as Interviewer

== Production ==
Some parts of the film were shot in Argentina. The scene at the Musée du Louvre in Paris, France was shot there.

== Release ==
The film was released on 11 August in Chile in 17 cinemas. About 6,000 people saw the film on the day of its release. There were not very many copies, so the film was not shown in major cities such as Chillán. After its box office success and an outcry by the press, it was shown more widely. It was released on 27 October in Argentina. The film was seen 391,465 times in 2011, making it the most watched Chilean film of 2011. The following year it was released at the Sundance Film Festival in the United States and later premiered in New York City at the Latinbeat film series held by The Film Society of Lincoln Center. Later in 2012, it was released in Brazil, the Netherlands, France, Peru, Germany, Sweden, and Belgium. It appeared at a variety of festivals including Paris Cinéma, Biarritz International Festival of Latin American Cinema, Hamburg Film Festival, and the Stockholm International Film Festival.

== Reception ==
The film was positively reviewed by critics in Chile. Daniel Villalobos from the newspaper, La Tercera, highlighted the way Violeta Parra is represented in the film and said "this could be the most eye-catching and agile film its director has released." René Naranjo focused on Francisa Gavilán's acting, referring to it as "emotional and outstanding, a Violeta full of qualities that gave unity to the ensemble and shed light on a personality that was marked by contrasts." Ana Josefa Silva of La Segunda wrote "in the end, it is a story brimming with truth, with passion, with happiness, and with profound sadness. [Violeta is] intensely vital and awesome".

== Awards ==
=== Nominations and mentions ===
Violeta Went to Heaven was selected by the National Council of Culture and the Arts as the Chilean entry for the Best Foreign Language Film at the 84th Academy Awards, but it did not make the final shortlist. Violeta se fue a los cielos was nominated for eight other awards in 2012. At the Argentinean Film Critics Association Awards it was nominated for the Silver Condor in the category of Best Foreign Film, Spanish language. At the Ariel Awards in Mexico it was nominated for the Silver Ariel for the Best Latin-American Film. At the Goya Awards it was nominated for the Goya in the category of Best Iberoamerican Film. At the Miami Film Festival it was nominated for the Grand Jury Prize in the Ibero-American Competition and received a special mention in Dramatic Features-Ibero-American Cinema Competition.

=== Won ===
Violeta se fue a los cielos was awarded the World Cinema Jury Prize (Dramatic) at the 2012 Sundance Film Festival. It won the FIPRESCI Prize for Best Film at the 2012 Guadalajara Mexican Film Festival. At the same festival, Francisca Gavilán won the Mayahuel Award for the Best Actress according to the Ibero-American jury. At the Lima Latin American Film Festival Fransisca Gavilán won a Best Actress Special Mention. Finally, the film won the French Latin American film festival in Toulouse it won the prize awarded by the public for the Best Film.

== Soundtrack ==
Francisca Gavilán, the actress who plays Violeta, sang all of Violeta's songs herself in the film. The film also showcases songs that are sung with Violeta's sister, Hilda and Hilda's daughter, Carmen Luisa. A song sung by a farmer is also included. 28 July 2011, before the film itself had been released, the soundtrack appeared on SoundCloud. Some songs that are heard in the film do not appear on the soundtrack, such as "El Cardenal" and "Gracias a la vida".

== See also ==
- List of submissions to the 84th Academy Awards for Best Foreign Language Film
- List of Chilean submissions for the Academy Award for Best Foreign Language Film

Awards
Preceded by Happy, Happy	Sundance Grand Jury Prize: World Cinema Dramatic; 2012	Succeeded by Jiseul
