= Las Rubias del Norte =

American musical group from Brooklyn, New York

Las Rubias del Norte (trans. The Blondes from the North) are a band from Brooklyn, New York formed by classically trained singers Allyssa Lamb and Emily Hurst. The band is known for playing Latin music including boleros, cha cha chas, cumbias, and huaynos. The name of the band is a pun on the well-known Mexican norteño band Los Tigres del Norte.

== Discography ==
- Rumba International (2004)
- Panamericana (2006)
- Ziguala (2010)
