= Emma Junaro =

Bolivian musician (born 1953)

- Origin: Bolivia
- Genres: Latin American / Andean music

Emma Junaro (born 1 November 1953 in Oruro, Bolivia) is a Bolivian musician.

Junaro's style incorporates Brazilian popular music, European folk styles and Andean music. She has worked with the record producer Fernando Cabrero on recording the poems of Matilde Casazola, a poet. Junaro's instrumentation is always acoustic, and has included zampona, charango, quena, piano and guitar.

== Discography ==
Albums

- Resolana (1981)
- Mi Corazón en la ciudad (1987)
- Entre dos silencios (1997)
- Tu semilla (1998) (with Jaime and César Junaro)

Contributing artist

- The Rough Guide to the Music of the Andes (1996, World Music Network)
- Unwired: Latin America (2001, World Music Network)
