= Micaela Chauque =

Argentine musician

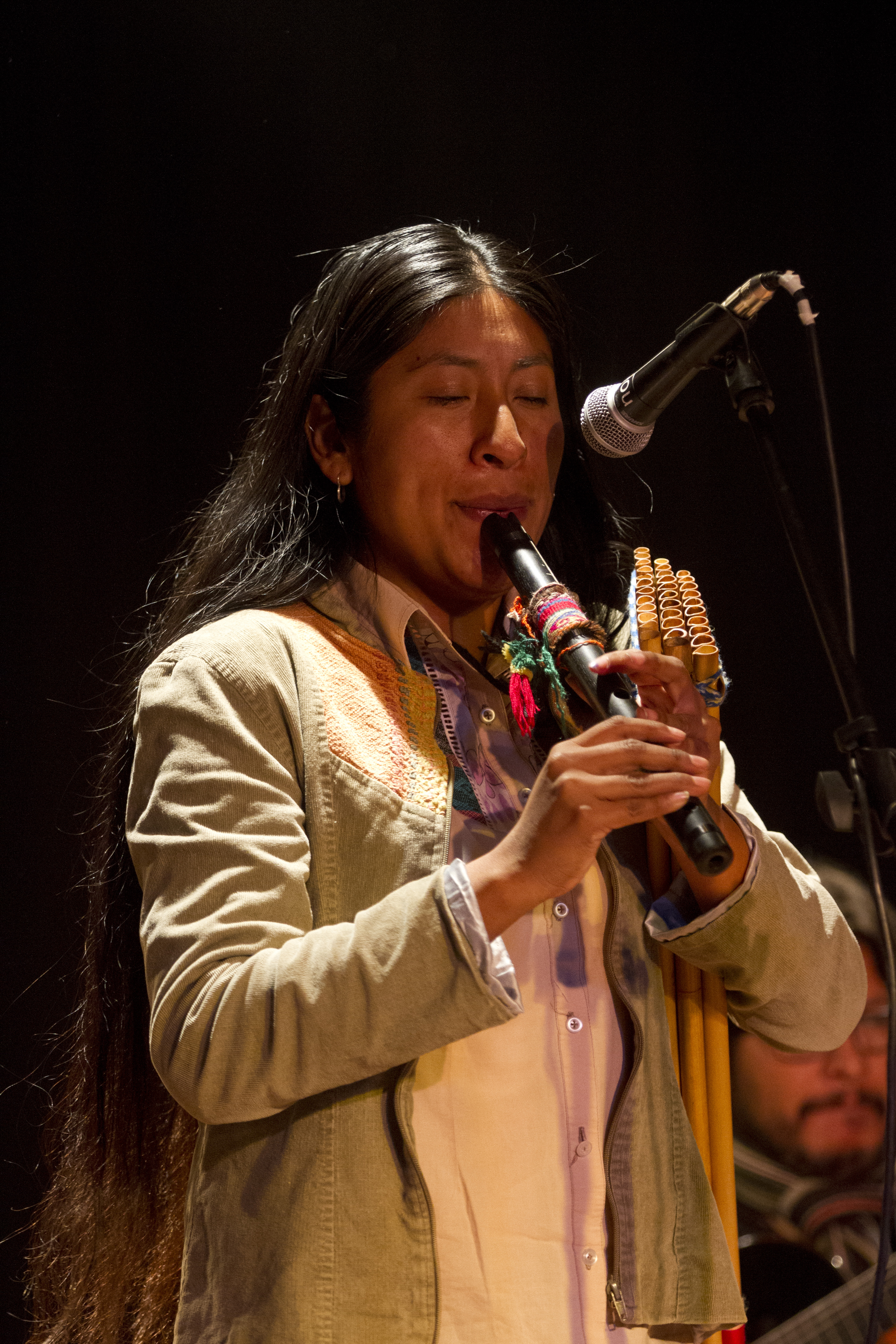
- Chauque performing in 2015

Background information
- Born: 15 January 1979 (age 47); Finca Santiago, Salta, Argentina
- Genres: Folk
- Occupations: Flutist; songwriter

Micaela Chauque (born 15 January 1979) is a Qulla Argentine composer, dancer, coplista and flautist, specializing in the quena and siku. She has been lauded as one of the best interpreters of Andean music in Argentina. She is also a music teacher and luthier.

== Background ==
Micaela Chauque was born on 15 January 1979 into a Qulla indigenous community in Finca Santiago, in the Iruya Department of Salta Province, Argentina. She later moved to Tilcara, Jujuy Province, where she grew up.

She was the first indigenous woman from the Quebrada de Humahuaca to be allowed to play the quena, as in indigenous traditions, the instrument is reserved for male players.

She studied Argentine folclore and native dance in Salta and Buenos Aires. She also studied to be a dance teacher, while perfecting her knowledge of the quena, the siku, the charango, the quenacho, and other traditional instruments used in Andean music.

== Musical career ==
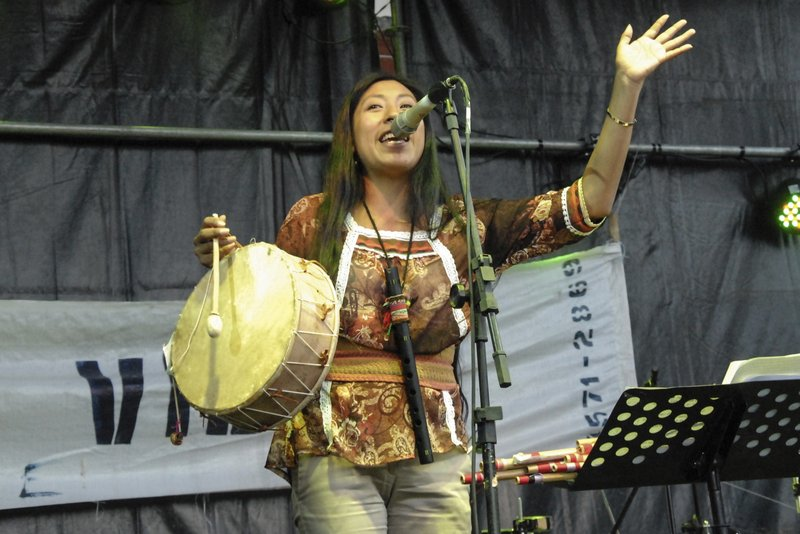
Chauque performing in 2014.

As a flautist, percussionist and dancer, she formed part of Jaime Torres y su gente, an ensemble formed by Jaime Torres, with whom she had her debut at the Cosquín National Festival. She would later form part of the Banda de Sikuris de Mujeres María Rosa Mística de Tilcara. In 2010, rock band Divididos featured her as a live performer during a concert in Tilcara.

In 2011, she performed three times at Cosquín Festival, as a live flautist for Rata Blanca lead singer Hugo Bistolfi, as the instrumentalist for coplista Mariana Carrizo, and later with singer Rubén Patagonia. Following their success at Cosquín, Bistolfi and Chauque continued to collaborate in a 2011 tour of the Argentine Northwest, and she later featured in Bistolfi's solo album Valles y quebradas.

In 2019, she was awarded the Gardel Award for best female folk album for Jallalla, released in 2018.

In 2022, she starred in the play Memorias del huevo-tiempo, opposite Anita Martínez. The play premiered in Tilcara.

== Discography ==
- El del Charango (with Jaime Torres), 2001
- Jujuy, canto y vida (with Carlos Cabrera), 2002
- Crisol: música instrumental andina, 2003
- Cuatro Mujeres: cantos de la tierra, 2005
- En Vivo: quenas y sikus, 2010
- Jallalla, 2018
