= Damaris (singer) =

Peruvian folk singer

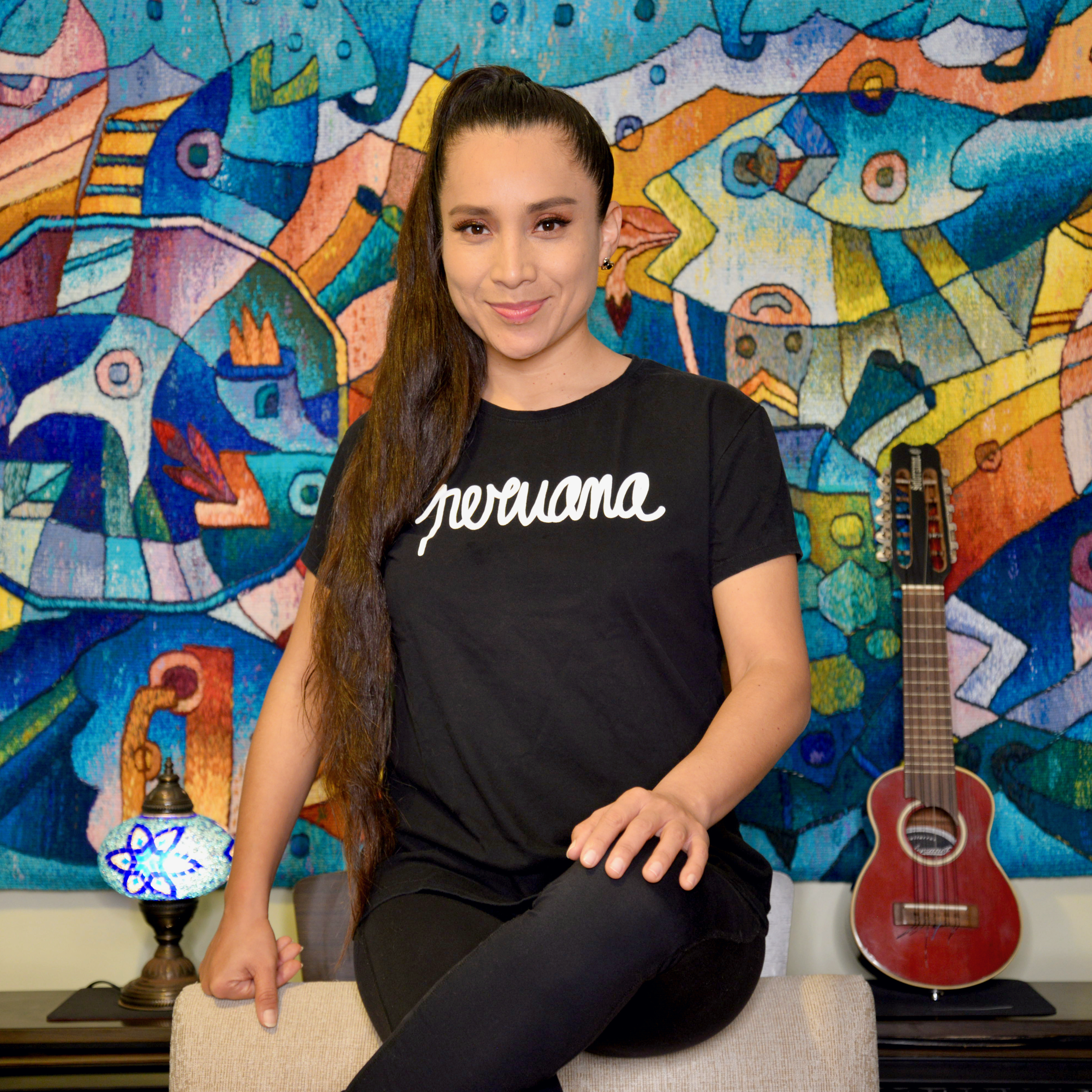

Background information
- Birth name: Damaris Mallma Porras
- Born: January 26, 1986 (age 39)
- Genres: Andean music, Pop
- Years active: 1993-present
- Website: www.damaris.com.pe (in Spanish)

Damaris Mallma Porras (born January 26, 1986, in Huancayo). The fusion of sounds and rhythms has been the scenario where Damaris has developed her musical career as a singer, songwriter, performer and music producer. Her music is inspired by the Latin American musical tradition and the search to build bridges with new musical forms. Damaris is to date the youngest Peruvian artist to be nominated for the Latin Grammys, at 22 years old in the category of best folk album. With her song “Tusuykusun” (Let's Dance) she became the first artist to win the "Viña del Mar International Song Festival" with a song in Quechua.

== Biography ==
Damaris was born on 26 January 1986 in Huancayo. She is the daughter of singer Victoria de Ayacucho, better known as Saywa. She started her music career in 1993 at the age of 7 in the music workshop "Yawar". Later she studied singing, music, theater and dance in Peru. Her debut as a singer was in 1994 at various institutions, such as the Teatro Segura in Lima, the Miraflores amphitheater and the Universidad Mayor de San Marcos. Damaris also took part in Peruvian groups, such as Yawar, Saywa, Tupay and the Andean Youth Choir with 20 musicians from 5 different Andean countries.

Between 1995 and 1997, she joined to the musical group of Saywa, improved her musical knowledge (keyboards, charango, guitar and singing) by taking personal tutor classes. She studied Peruvian Dance with the Tupay group and began to travel abroad and all over Peru with this group.

In 2001, Damaris won the Pepsi Charts Contest for her composition "Porque no estas aqui" (Because you are not here), she traveled to the United States to record an album and then returned to Peru to finish High School.

In 2002, she began studies in piano, harmony and composition at the Kodaly Music Institute of Lima, and also took private singing classes with Martina Jara.

She joined to the Coro Andino Juvenil which incorporated 20 young representatives from five Latin American countries; this group is led by Venezuelan teachers, including Wilfredo Tarazona.

That same year, Damaris released a demo with two promotional songs: "Triste y sola" (sad and lonely) and "Imillitay" which both had a good response from the public. Because of this success, she started the production of a CD. She also began to appear as a soloist in places like Lima, Huancayo, Ica, Pucallpa and other cities.

In 2003, she presented her first production Dame una señal (Give me a sign) and went on tours in Peru and the United States (Washington DC, Virginia, New Jersey and New York). In 2004, she postulated to the Theatrical School at Pontificia Universidad Catolica del Perú.

In 2005, she began to work on her second musical production that explores different rhythms and genres of Peru, mixing and merging them.

In 2006, Damaris participated at the Festival de los Andes in New Jersey (USA)

In 2007, she presented her new three years work and research production called Mil Caminos in a concert presented at "Gran Parque de Lima" on June. This new album shows a new phase in Damaris's career: artistic and personal maturity in her compositions. The singles "Vida", "Tusuykusun" and "Mil Caminos" were promoted in the best radios of Lima and other departments of Peru.

On February 24, 2008, she won the Folk competition at the 49th edition of the Viña del Mar International Song Festival with her song "Tusuykusun" (Quechuan "Let's Dance", she won the "Gaviota de Plata" (Silver Gull), which is the highest award of that festival. The same song ("Tusuykusun") was chosen to be used as a hymn to the ALC-UE economic summit which took place in Peru. Also in 2008, Damaris was nominated to compete in the ninth annual Latin Grammy Awards in the category of "Folk Album" for her album Mil Caminos.

In February 2009, she took part again in the Festival of Viña del Mar competing for the "Lira de Oro". In July 2009, Damaris competed in the Peruvian version of the reality show El Show de los sueños.

At the beginning of 2010, she began some presentations in Peru with the name "Volver a mi tierra" (Back to my land) together with her mother Saywa. They were accompanied by invited artists. In September 2010, Damaris took over the presentation of the television Folk program "Misk'i Takiy" (Quechuan: Sweet Singing), which is dedicated to spreading the traditional and contemporary Andean music by TVPeru. Damaris and Saywa were featured in a 2010 television documentation by the German channel Phoenix.

== Discography ==
- Dame una señal (2003)
- Mil Caminos (2007)
- Volver a mi Tierra, En Vivo (2011)
- Tu Puedes Volar (2019)
- Yanantin, En vivo 20 años (2024)
