= Adiós pueblo de Ayacucho =

Song from Peru

Adiós pueblo de Ayacucho is a popular traditional Peruvian huayno from Ayacucho.

Like many traditional songs, there is a wide variation in the lyrics.

The song has been widely recorded.
