= Bolivia Manta =

- Origin: Bolivia
- Genres: Andean folk, Huayno
- Years active: 1977–present
- Labels: Auvidis, A.S.P.I.C.
- Members: Guido Alcala; Carlos Arguedas; Julio Arguedas; Evert Tito; Michael Evaristo; Betty Castro; Alejandro Cordova; Guillermo Contreras Ramos; Luis Chugar; Helena Meininger; Noemy Flores; Jaime Corihuanca; Oscar Corihuanca; Leo Mamani; Johnny Chambi; Pablo Conde; Felix Capo; Willan Farinango; Pablo Reynaga.
- Past members: Victor Colodro Morales

Bolivia Manta is a Bolivian group created in France in 1977 by Carlos and Julio Arguedas that performs traditional music of pre-Hispanic and contemporary music of the Andes, particularly that of the Aymara and Quechua-speaking people of Bolivia and also traditional music of peoples of Peru and Ecuador. Bolivia Manta albums reference Andean folklore, these dances and songs are collected in different parts of Peru, Bolivia and Ecuador, and most tracks are authentic performances of traditional rural music. They perform their music on indigenous flutes, panpipes and drums, as well as stringed instruments introduced since the Spanish conquest. In 1981, the group was awarded the Académie Charles Cros Grand Prix for the album Winayataqui, and in 1985, they received a Laser d'or from the Académie du disque français for the album Pak'cha.

== Discography ==
- Sartañani (1978)
- Winayataqui (1981)
- Quechua Music (1983)
- Pak'cha (1985)
- Anata (1986)
- Tinkuna (1990)
- Auki Pacha (1995)
