= Khanata =

Contemporary Bolivian Andean music group

Khanata, or Grupo Khanata, is a contemporary Bolivian Andean music group.

In the time after the 1973 Chilean coup d'état, Khanata and other folk groups toured the United States and Europe. In 1981, the group was situated in Cochabamba.

== See also ==
- Music of Bolivia
