= Feminist International Radio Endeavor =

Internet radio station

Feminist International Radio Endeavor (FIRE) (also known as Radio Internacional Feminista) is an international women's internet radio station based in Costa Rica. Scholars have said that by providing a channel for female voices and giving alternative accounts of war and conflict, that it has performed important feminist media work supporting peace and social justice. It was founded in 1991 by an international group of women including journalist María Suárez Toro.
