= Valicha =

Song
- Language: Quechua
- Genre: Cusqueño Huayno
- Length: 3:36
- Composer: Miguel Ángel Hurtado Delgado
- Lyricist: Evencio Hurtado Delgado

"Valicha" is a song with a huayno rhythm written in 1945 by Miguel Ángel Hurtado Delgado.

The melody first emerged in 1942 in the composition Tusuy (in Quechua: 'Dance'), which included the melody of what would later become Valicha and some verses in Spanish. Subsequently, his brother Evencio Hurtado adapted the lyrics to Quechua, which is how it became known, especially following the 1945 Regional Folklore Contest, where Evencio participated and won first place.

== Inspiration ==
The inspiration for the composition Tusuy came from Miguel Ángel Hurtado's romantic experience with Valeriana Huillca Condori (whose nickname was Valicha). They met in the town of Acopia (Acomayo Province, Cusco Department), where Hurtado's parents resided. Miguel Ángel would come from Lima during school holidays and had a secret relationship with Valeriana, a Quechua-speaking peasant. The relationship ended shortly before Valicha was sent to Cusco by her parents' orders.

On Sunday, 18 May 2014, it was reported that Huillca Condori had died in the city of Acopía, in the Acomayo Province of Cusco. "Valicha" died at the age of 101.

== Changes in the lyrics ==
On 3 July 2014, the news portal RPP reported a story about how there are at least two versions of the lyrics created by the original author. The first praises Valeriana Huillca, but the second, due to a chauvinistic condemnation of some of Valeriana's actions, criticizes her and can even be considered offensive. Both versions are registered. The first was registered in the National Library of Peru in Record No. 558 in 1947 and “Valicha” in Record No. 239 – 1958.
