= The Rough Guide to the Music of Central America =

Compilation album by Various artists
- Released: 25 September 2001
- Genre: World, Central American
- Length: 68:23
- Label: World Music Network

Full series chronology
Unwired: Latin America (2001)	The Rough Guide to the Music of Central America (2001)	The Rough Guide to Nusrat Fateh Ali Khan (2002)

The Rough Guide to the Music of Central America is a world music compilation album originally released in 2001. Part of the World Music Network Rough Guides series, it has been described as the first comprehensive CD collection of Central American music. The album contains five tracks from Belize, three each from Honduras, Nicaragua, and Costa Rica, two from Panama, and one from Guatemala. The compilation was compiled by Daniel Rosenberg, co-ordinated by Duncan Baker and produced by Phil Stanton, co-founder of the World Music Network.

Thom Jurek of AllMusic gave the album four stars, calling the music a "revelation" and a "stunning wake-up call". Robert Christgau was less enthusiastic, describing the album as leaning more toward Creole cultures than the "subcontinent" warranted.

== Track listing ==
No.	Title	Artist (Country)	Length
1.	"Nagúara"	Andy Palacio (Belize)	0:42
2.	"Luna Llena"	Guillermo Anderson (Honduras)	6:00
3.	"Balandria"	Jursino Cayetano (Guatemala)	3:57
4.	"Agosto Azul"	Guadalupe Urbina (Costa Rica)	4:54
5.	"Lamiselu"	Andy Palacio (Belize)	3:28
6.	"Bilwi Luhpia Mairen"	Philip Montalvan (Nicaragua)	4:51
7.	"Lugua Hama Lurudu"	Lugua & The Larubeya Drummers (Honduras)	3:26
8.	"Por Esa Negra"	Guillermo Anderson (Honduras)	4:12
9.	"Retorno"	Rómulo Castro Y El Grupo Tuira (Panama)	3:46
10.	"El Salvador"	Carlos Mejia Godoy (Nicaragua)	4:42
11.	"Bihine Mi Bak Dehn Taak"	Mr. Peters And His Boom & Chime (Belize)	3:17
12.	"Fire"	New Revelation (Costa Rica)	3:42
13.	"Wabouga"	Lincoln Lewis (Belize)	4:21
14.	"La Herencia Del Pela'o"	Rómulo Castro Y El Grupo Tuira (Panama)	4:36
15.	"El Negrito"	Afro Caribe (Costa Rica)	4:11
16.	"Alaporio"	Titiman Flores (Belize)	4:49
17.	"Nicaragua Nicaragüita"	Carlos Mejia Godoy (Nicaragua)	3:29

Professional ratings
Review scores
Source	Rating
Allmusic	4/5 stars
Robert Christgau	**
