= María Suárez Toro =

Puerto Rican journalist

- Born: July 5, 1948 (age 78); Puerto Rico
- Education: State University of New York
- Occupation: Journalist
- Known for: Journalism, activist for human rights

María Suárez Toro (born Puerto Rico, June 5, 1948) is a feminist journalist, an activist in defense of human rights, and an educator. She was born in Puerto Rico and has been a resident of San José, Costa Rica for close to 50 years. She is founder in 2014 of Centro Comunitario de Buceo Embajadoras Del Mar in Costa Rica’s Southern Caribbean. She is founder and director of ESCRIBANA, a feminist digital media venue since 2011. She was a co-director of the Feminist International Radio Endeavor (FIRE) from 1991 to 2011, of which she is a co-founder. She worked as an educator in literacy in many countries in Central America during the 1970s and 1980s. Since 1998 she has been an Associate Professor of Communication at the University of Denver. Since 2011 she has been a correspondent for Haiti, Puerto Rico, and Costa Rica for the News Service for the Women of Latin America and the Caribbean (Servicio de Noticias de la Mujer de Latinoamérica y el Caribe), and since 2015 has been a coordinator of the Community Center Diving Ambassadors of the South Caribbean Sea (Centro comunitario de buceo Embajadores y Embajadoras del Mar del Caribe Sur), which is dedicated to archeological diving and recovery of the history of the afro-descendant population on the coast of Costa Rica.

== Career ==
She studied at the San José Academy of Puerto Rico. In 1970, she moved to New York City where she received a Masters of Education at State University of New York (SUNY). In 2002, she graduated with a degree in journalism at the Saint Judas Thaddeus Federal University of Puerto Rico (1999-2002) and in 2005 received a doctorate of Education at La Salle University of Costa Rica with a dissertation published under the title Women: Metamorphosis of the Butterfly Effect (2008) in which she made visible the stories of women who "have been challenging and transforming traditional ways of thinking and analysis from the sciences, art, humans rights, and politics". In 2005, a musical theatre production that she co-produced debuted.

=== Literacy educator ===
Engaged in the process of Central American literacy in the 1970s and 1980s, she worked as an educator in El Salvador, Costa Rica, Nicaragua, and Honduras. She is the coauthor of several publications including the manual Toward a Methodology of Women's Rights Education in 1995 for The Decade of Human Rights Education. In 1988, she produced and authored Women's Adult Literacy Book for women working in the banana production center in Golfito, Costa Rica, which was published by the University of Costa Rica and the United Nations' Fund for the Development of Women (Fondo de Desarrollo de las Naciones Unidas para la Mujer - UNIFEM). Also, she coauthored two volumes titled Vencimos (We Overcame), which were about adult literacy in Nicaragua in 1980. In 1993, she published Guin - Children of the War in El Salvador, which was about the situation of children in the war zones of El Salvador.

=== Journalist and communication ===
In 1991, she co-founded the Feminist International Radio Endeavor (FIRE) which was a radio pioneer in using the internet to distribute content which defended that women's rights are human rights. (Note: Started as a radio broadcast, and then moved to internet streaming in 1998.) It was especially useful to spread the voices of women, ideas, activities, and movements.

"When I was hired to produce and launch FIRE, it was the first time in my life that I was given a job for who I am and not only what I have done. I mean, I was hired because I am a women, Latin-American, because I am bilingual and because I am a feminist. That is quite a combination for a Puerto Rican that has lived and worked in Puerto Rico, the United States, and Central America". - María Suárez Toro

As the co-director of FIRE, Suárez covered numerous international events, including UN conferences on various topics (women, environment, racism, etc.) taking place, since 1992, in Rio de Janeiro, Vienna, Cairo, Beijing, and Durbam, as well as many other national and international events.

In 1998, she began work as an Associate Professor of Communication at the University of Denver, and, from 1995 to 2000, at the Institute for Further Education of Journalists (FOJO) in Sweden.

Since 2000, she has been editor of the biannual magazine Voices on FIRE, published by FIRE, which has had its articles republished in international magazines such as People and the Planet, Women in Action, Women and the Heath Network in Chile, TAMWA in Tanzania, the Health Journal of South Africa, the Brecha in Central America by CODEHUCA, etc.

In 2006, she joined the Mesoamerican feminist network "Petateras."

In 2007, she worked closely with Ailyn Morera Ugalde to produce the musical theatre piece "The Labyrinth of the Butterflies" based on her doctoral thesis.

In April 2011, she retired from FIRE and began work as a correspondent in Haiti, Puerto Rico, and Costa Rica for SEMIac. In January 2012, she founded the Community Institute for Women in Development and Communication.

=== Activism for ocean sustainability ===
She is also involved in activism for sustainability and the environment. In 2001, she published the book Is this Beautiful Country for Sale?, which is about the controversial extraction of crude oil on the Atlantic Coast of Costa Rica and the popular democratic movement organized to stop it. In 2011, she joined the administrative committee of the Association of Southern Caribbean Fisherman of Limón. In 2013, she joined Southern Caribbean Forum, which was created to protect the rights of people of African descent in Costa Rica.

Since 2015 she has been the co-founder and co-coordinator of the Community Center Diving Ambassadors of the South Caribbean Sea, which wants to protect marine ecosystems, the life and culture of responsible fishing, and the legacy of the relationship of people with the sea in the Southern Caribbean. One focus of this research is the contribution of African descent through archeological diving.

== Publications ==
- Vencimos: la cruzada nacional de alfabetización de Nicaragua (1980) IDRC Bogotá 1983
- Women Transforming Communications: Global Intersections (Allen, Rush, Kaufman. 1996). Coauthor
- Looking At The World Through Women's Eyes, NGO Forum of the United Nations IV World Conference on Women (1996). Coauthor
- Women's Rights - Human Rights: International Feminist Perspective. (Peters and Wolfer. 1995). Coauthor
- Recognizing and Realizing Women´s Human Rights coauthor of the chapter in the book called The Universal Declaration of Human Rights: Fifty Years and Beyond (Danili, Stamatoupolou and Dias, 1999).
- Giving Women a Voice in the Face of Globalization: A Case Study of Alternative Media in Costa Rica? coauthor of the chapter in the book called Reclaiming the Future: Women´s Strategies Towards the 21 st Century (Somer Bodribb, 2000).
- Women's Voices on Fire: Feminist International Radio Endeavour (2000) Anomaly Pr (January 2000) ISBN 0967291208
- Se Vende Lindo Pais? (2001)
- La Tranca (2002) with Cristina Zeledon published by the Instituto Tecnológico Costarricense
- Mujeres, Metamorfosis del Efecto Mariposa (2008) Editorial Farben/Norma in Costa Rica
- Mi Propia Metamorfosis (2009) Publicaciones Puertoriquehans
- Tona Ina: La Misteriosa Cueva de un Pez León en Cahuita (2017), Universidad de Costa Rica sede Caribe
- Tona Ina: La Luz en el Mar Caribe, (2021) CIDICER y UCR sede Caribe.
