= Awatiñas =

The Awatiñas are a Bolivian folk music group begun in the 1970s by Mario Conde. Their ballads are mostly sung in Spanish and Aymara. They are popular across much of Latin America and have a substantial following in parts of Europe, Asia, and North America.

== Songs ==
Among their best-known works are:

- “Kullita”
- “Mi triste adiós”
- “Tu traición”
- “Tunkata P'a Tunkaru”
- “Tunkata pá tunkaru”
- “Dulce Bolivianita”

== Discography ==
Contributing artist

- The Rough Guide to the Music of the Andes (1996, World Music Network)
