= Gilbert Favre =

Gilbert Favre (November 19, 1936 – December 12, 1998) was a clarinetist from Geneva, Switzerland. He trained at the Conservatory of Geneva, and also played jazz clarinet.

In South America, he discovered the quena, and when he moved to Bolivia, he traded in his clarinet. In La Paz, he created the musical cabaret "La Peña Naira" at the Plaza San Francisco featuring indigenous music. The club became a hub for the diplomatic corps stationed in La Paz, as well as a favorite for Bolivians. Gilbert was the founding member of the popular Bolivian folk group Los Jairas. Favre was commonly referred to as "El Gringo" by the Bolivian public.

Favre traveled from Geneva to South America as assistant to the Swiss anthropologist Jean Christian Spahni. In Santiago, Favre met celebrated Chilean folk singer Violeta Parra and fell in love. Favre played quena with Violeta and her son Angel Parra. He appears on recordings as "El Tocador Afuerino". Favre eventually left for Bolivia, where he created "La Peña Naira" and started experimenting with Andean music playing alongside virtuoso guitar player Alfredo Dominguez and renowned charango player Ernesto Cavour. Parra appeared several times at La Pena. Favre returned to Geneva in the early 1960s together with Parra; after a few years in Europe, they returned to South America.

As the Trio Domínguez-Favre-Cavour gained media attention and became increasingly popular for their "neofolklore", Favre decided not to move back to Chile and left Parra for good; she would later write "Run Run Se Fue Pa'l Norte," dedicated to her lover. Violetta Parra would later commit suicide. Their relationship was portrayed in the award-winning film Violeta Went to Heaven (2011), in which Favre was played by Thomas Durand.

Favre met his first wife Indiana in Bolivia; they settled in the Dordogne area of France and had two sons, Patrick and Christian. The couple later divorced and while in Paris, Favre met his second wife Barbara Erskine, then working for the New York Times. They lived in Russin, Switzerland, where Favre died in 1998. Christian died in a motorcar accident while holidaying in France.
