= Eddy Navia =

Eddy Navía Dalence (born 6 September 1949) is a Bolivian composer, musician, and charango virtuoso.

== Biography ==
Two-time Latin Grammy nominee Eddy Navia was born in Potosí, Bolivia. He began his musical career in the 1960s by forming the group "Los Rebeldes," which played contemporary popular music, including pieces by the Ventures. After his studies led him outside Bolivia, he began performing on the charango and became a virtuoso of the instrument. Navia first recorded with guitarist Gerardo Arias, and in 1970, he recorded three albums with Julio Cesar Paredes.

In 1975, Navia co-founded the legendary group Savia Andina with Alcides Mejia, Oscar Castro, Julio Cesar Paredes, and later Gerardo Arias. They performed works by the great masters on indigenous instruments, primarily focusing on Bolivian music. Eddy composed beloved works such as "Tinkuna", "Copagira", "Tacuaral", "Summit", "Dance of the Sicuri." The recordings of Savia Andina even hit the top forties chart in South America. Navia was the first charanguist to interpret works by great classical composers on the self-titled album Savia Andina, released in 1978. The group toured the world, performing in Paris, Russia, Japan, Tahiti, and Australia.

In 1989, Navia left Savia Andina to move to the United States and became the Artistic Director of the Group Sukay, which has been performing internationally for 40 years. Eddy has released seven solo albums, contributed to 35 recordings with Savia Andina, and 30 more with the Sukay World Music label. He currently resides in San Francisco, California, and co-founded the Peña Pachamama Center with his wife of 32 years, Quentin Navia. The center, named after 'Pachamama' meaning 'Mother Earth' in Quechua, has been open for over 21 years. Eddy continues to perform music with his wife, Quentin, who co-founded SUKAY in 1974, and their son, Gabriel Navia.

== Awards ==
Quentin and Eddy created a recording and publishing company producing 29 more recordings available at CD Baby, Amazon, and iTunes. The latest of these recordings were Grammy nominees. Eddy Navia was nominated two times for a Latin Grammy for his albums of folk music "Piano and Charango" and "Carnaval in Piano Charango" recorded together with Cuban Chuchito Valdés in 2012 and 2013.
