= Matilde Casazola =

Bolivian poet and songwriter

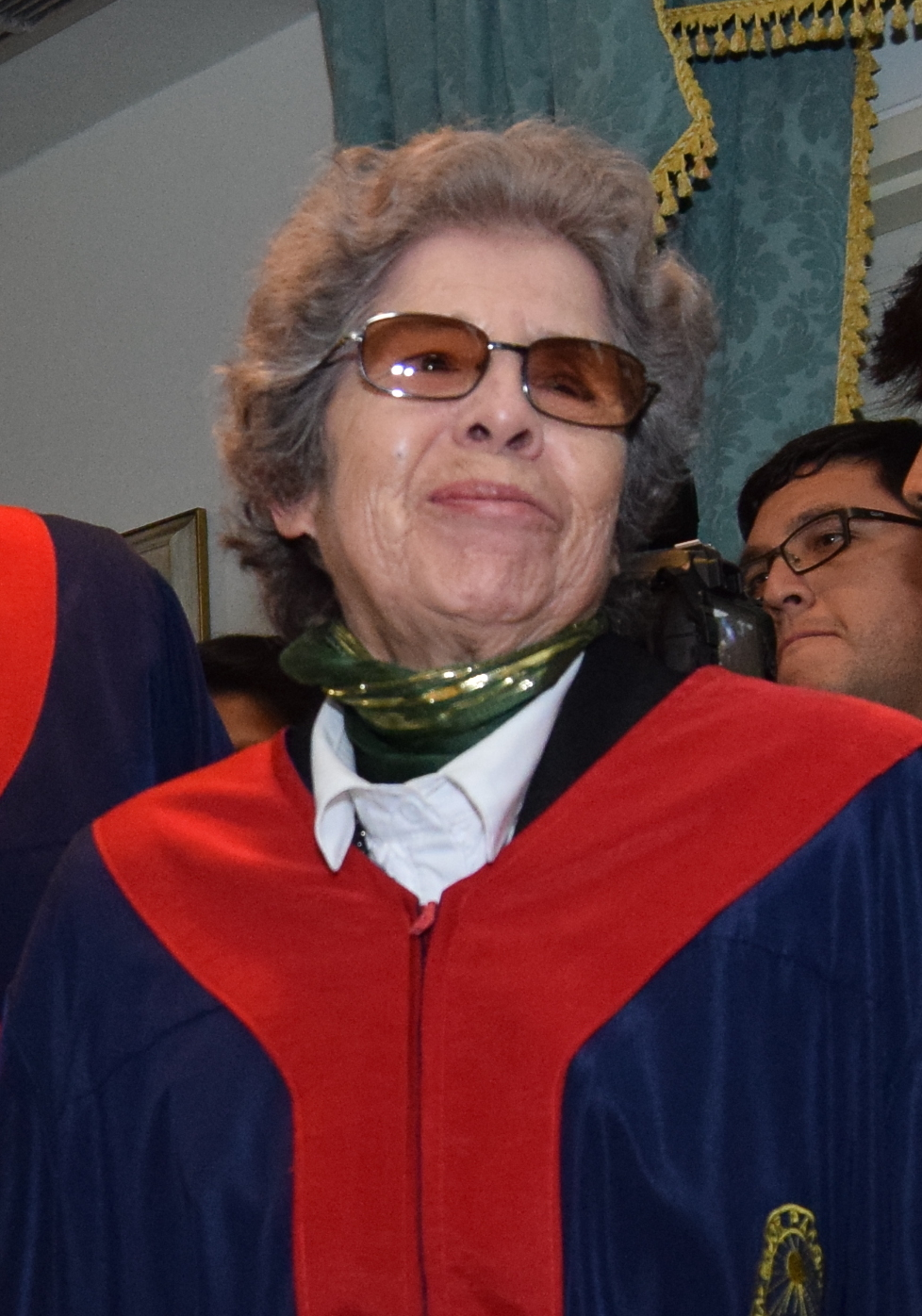

Matilde Casazola Mendoza (born 19 February 1942) is a Bolivian poet and songwriter who writes songs rooted in her country's musical traditions. In 2022, she was awarded the Order of the Condor of the Andes.

== Life and work ==
Matilde Casazola was born in Sucre, the daughter of Juan Casazola Ugarte and Tula Mendoza Loza; granddaughter of the author of Macizo boliviano, Jaime Mendoza. At the age of eleven, she won the First Prize at the Children's Floreales Games in the city of Sucre. She studied music at the Normal School of Teachers, where the Spanish professor Pedro García Ripoll was one of her teachers.

In 1974, Casazola visited Argentina where she had an extensive tour singing and composing more poems and songs. Upon her return, she held her first concerts in Bolivia. Later in 1982, she went on another extensive European tour singing and composing, broadening the horizons of her artistic pursuit.

She has published thirteen books of poetry and nine discs and cassettes. She has held the Guitar Chair for several years at the National School of Folklore "Mauro Núñez Cáceres" in the city of La Paz.

Her legacy includes the following poetic works: Los ojos abiertos (1967), Los cuerpos (1967), Una revelación (1967), Los racimos (1985), Amores de alas fugaces (1986), Estampas, meditaciones, cánticos (1990) and El espejo del ángel (1991). Casazola's most important publications include Obra Poética (Imprenta Judicial, Sucre, 1996), which compiled twelve of her poetry books, and Canciones del Corazón para la Vida (Ediciones Gráficas EG, La Paz, 1998), a songbook that includes forty of her compositions of writing and music.

Her work is cited in national and foreign anthologies and her songs have been covered by renowned artists such as Emma Junaro, Luis Rico, and Jenny Cárdenas.

In 2004 she published La Carne de los Sueños (La Hoguera Publishing House, Santa Cruz), which included her poetry in the Autobiographic Series. This volume covers the work produced between the years 1982 and 1983.

In 2006 the Italian-Bolivian filmmaker Paolo Agazzi premiered his film El atraco where the composer Cergio Prudencio musicalized poems by Matilde Casazola, performed by Spanish singer and actress Lucía Jiménez, one of them entitled La noche más cruel.

Casazola received Bolivia's National Culture Award in 2016.
