= Manuel Raygada =

Peruvian poet and songwriter

Manuel Raygada Ballesteros (March 8, 1904 – April 5, 1971) was a poet and songwriter of Peruvian Musica criolla, best known for his often covered "Mi Perú" (My Peru). He was born in Callao.

== Songs ==
- Mi Perú
- Nostalgia Chalaca
- Mi Retorno
- Mechita
- Santa Rosa de Lima
- Así era Ella
- Acuarela Criolla
- Hilos de Plata
