= Longo Maï =

European-Latin American agricultural cooperative network

The Longo Maï Co-operatives are a network of agricultural co-operatives with an anti-capitalist ideological focus. Founded in 1973 in Limans, France, the network has spread in Europe and to Central America.

== History ==
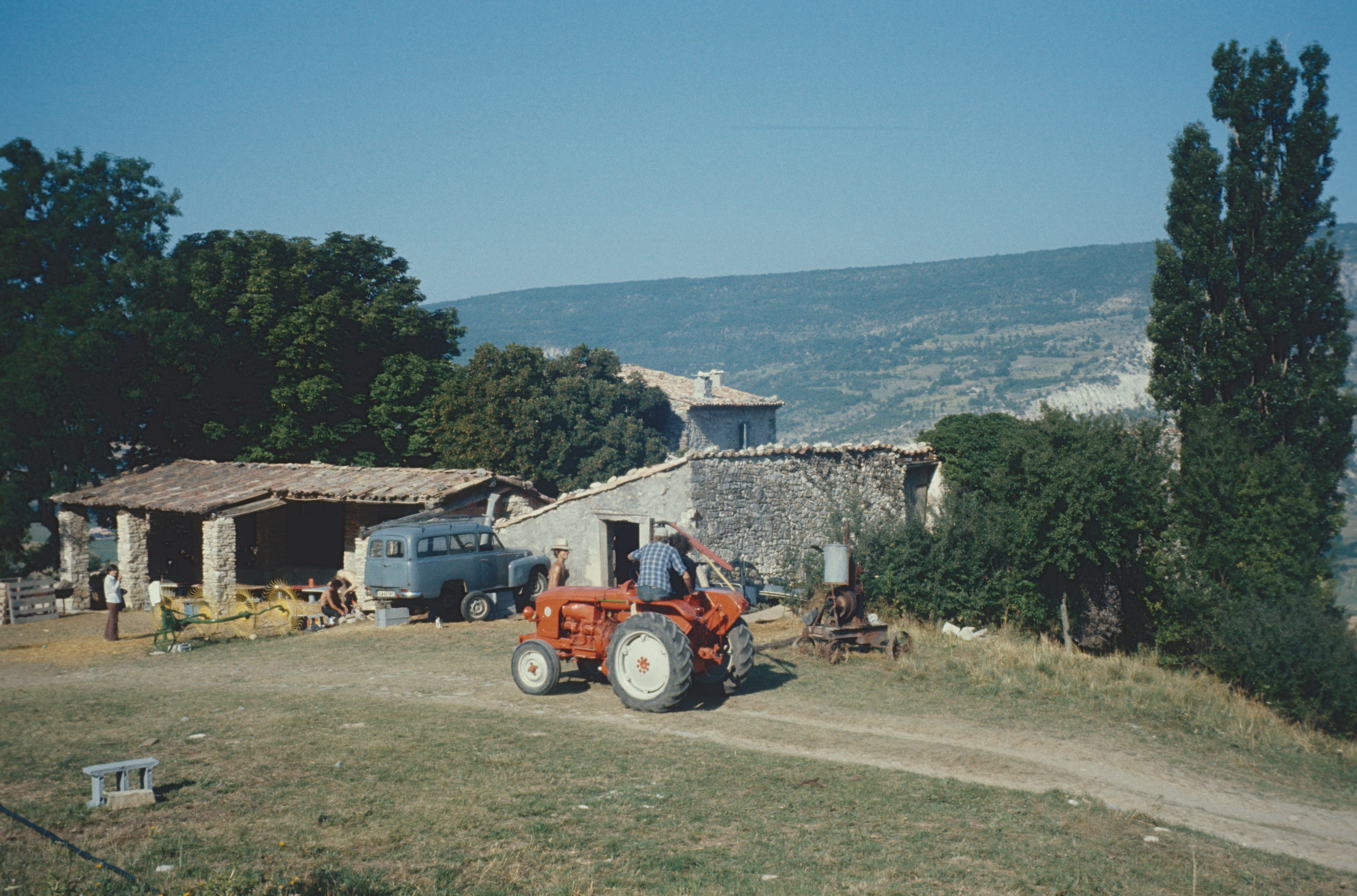
The first co-operative in Limans

Following the events of May 68, groups of students from Austria and Switzerland who held anarchist ideologies collaborated to raise funds to allow them to buy land upon which to start to farm collectively. In 1973, they purchased 270 hectares of land at Limans near Forcalquier.

The community's ideological leader was Roland Perrot, a military deserter from the war in Algeria. Perrot knew Jean Giono and had experienced the free commune in Contadour in the 1930s. The ideological focus of the community is anti-militarist, pacifist, anti-capitalist, and egalitarian. Activities focus upon self-sufficiency, community life, craft and agricultural production, the joint management of energy, water, and respect for the environment.

Longo Maï has been involved with various international solidarity efforts with a particular focus on resistance against dictatorships.

== Facilities ==
The ten Longo Mai co-operatives operate in a network:

- In France:
  - Limans
  - Briançon, Saint-Chaffrey (Hautes-Alpes) which processes 12 to 15 tons of wool a year
  - Mas de Granier, the village of Caphan at Saint-Martin-de-Crau (Bouches-du-Rhone);
  - Treyne, Chanéac, Upper Ardèche (twenty adults and twelve children in 1999)
  - Cabrery, wine and olive trees
- In other countries:
  - Ulenkrug, Mecklenburg, Germany;
  - Hof Stopar Eisenkappel in Carinthia, Austria (17 hectares plus 25 hectares leased, breeding sheep)
  - Montois farm in the Swiss Jura (12 ha geese and sheep)
  - Uzhgorod, Transcarpathia, Ukraine, with a French school in the 1990s
  - Finca Sonador in Costa Rica

The head office of the cooperative is in Basel, from which are organised campaigns to collect donations (about five million francs a year in the 1990s).

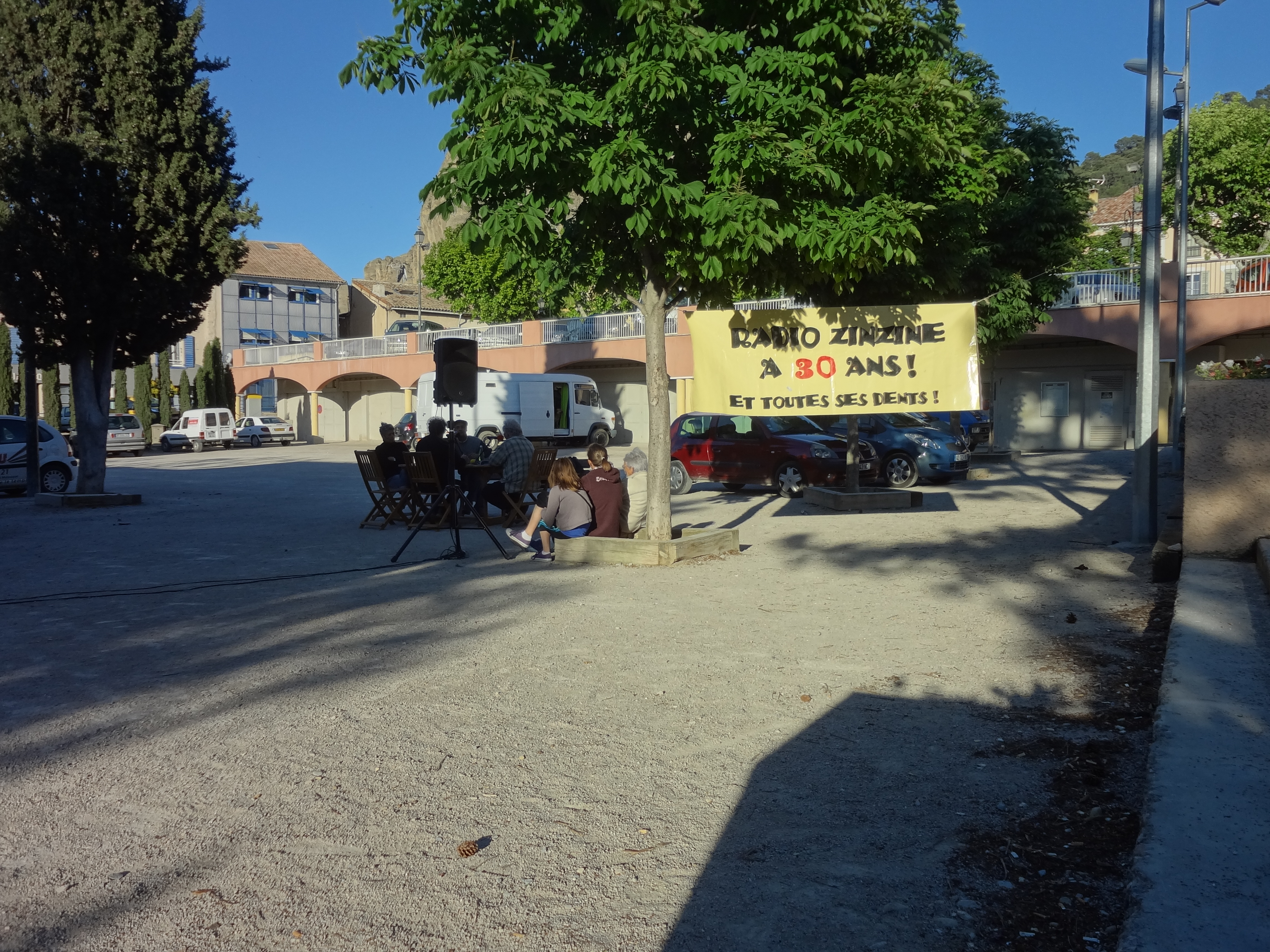
30 years of Radio Zinzine

The cooperative also has media operations

- Radio Zinzine: A Free radio founded in 1981 and named after the hill in Limans on which the community was founded. It is affiliated to the European Federation of Free Radio
- a news agency, l'Agence Indépendante d'information (AIM), which has a hundred contributing journalists
- le journal Archipel, Journal of the European Civic Forum
- It also publishes some books.

== See also ==
- Coopératives Longo Maï - from Wikipedia France
- La coopérative Européenne Longo Mai de Limans
