= Manuelcha Prado =

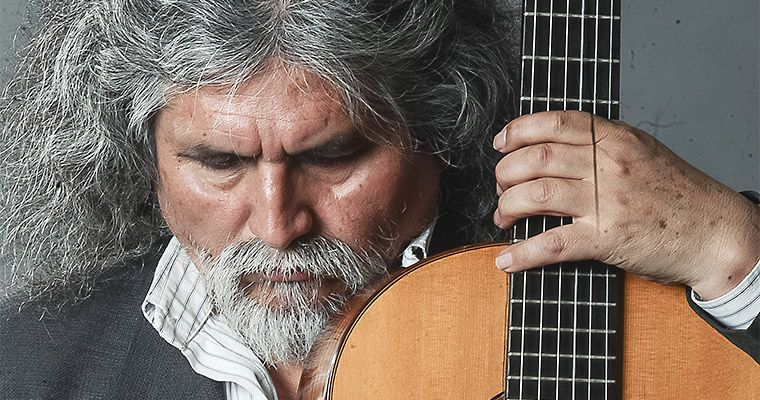

Background information
- Also known as: The Saqra of the Guitar
- Born: Manuel Prado Alarcón; 10 June 1955 (age 71); Puquio, Ayacucho, Peru
- Genres: Folk, andean music
- Occupations: Guitarist, troubadour, composer, musician, singer-songwriter
- Instruments: Vocals, guitar
- Years active: 1972–present
- Label: Trilucero Producciones
- Website: www.manuelcha.com

Manuelcha Prado (born 10 June 1955) is a guitarist, singer, composer, compiler and troubadour of Andean music. He is also known by many people as "The Saqra of the Guitar".

== Albums ==
- 1981: Guitarra Indígena
- 1985: Testimonio Ayacuchano
- 1987: Guitarra y Canto del Ande
- 1992: Sixtucha&Manuelcha Prado
- 1994: 25 Aniversario
- 2000: Saqra
- 2003: El Solterito
- 2003: Poesía Quechua
- 2007: Madre Andina
- 2012: Vidallay Vida
