= Andean music =

Style of music

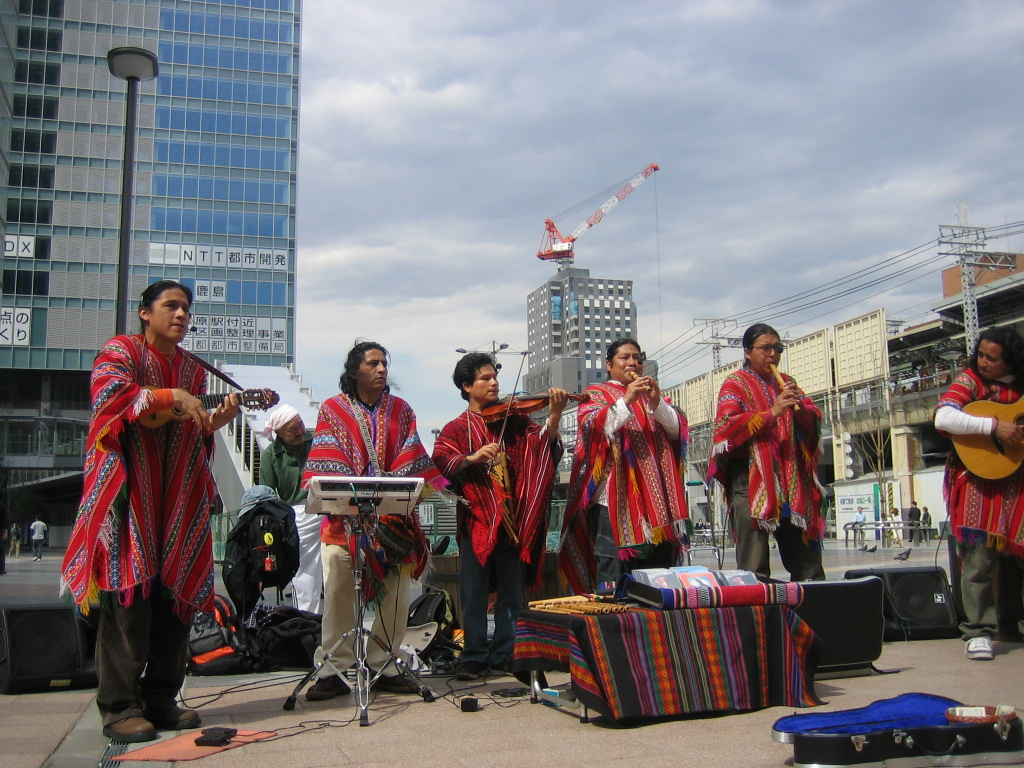
Street band from Peru performing El Cóndor Pasa in Tokyo

Andean music is a group of styles of music from the Andes region in South America.

Original chants and melodies come from the general area inhabited by Quechuas (originally from Peru, Bolivia, Ecuador, Chile), Aymaras (originally from Bolivia), and other peoples who lived roughly in the area of the Inca Empire prior to European contact. This early music then was fused with music elements. It includes folklore music of parts of Peru, Bolivia, and Ecuador. Andean music is popular to different degrees across South America, having its core public in rural areas and among indigenous populations. The Nueva Canción movement of the 1970s revived the genre across South America and brought it to places where it was unknown or forgotten.

== Instruments ==
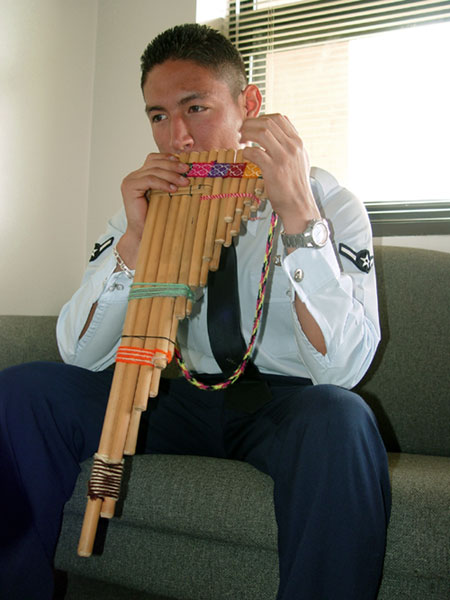
The panflute is among the most emblematic instruments of Andean music.

The panpipes group include the sikú (or zampoña) and Antara. These are ancient indigenous instruments that vary in size, tuning, and style. Instruments in this group are constructed from aquatic reeds found in many lakes in the Andean region of South America. The sikú has two rows of canes and are tuned in either pentatonic or diatonic scales. Some modern single-row panpipes modeled after the native antara are capable of playing full scales, while traditional sikús are played using two rows of canes wrapped together. It is still commonplace for two performers to share a melody while playing the larger style of sikú called the toyo. This style of voicing with notes interspersed between two musicians is called playing in hocket and is still in use today in many of the huaynos traditional songs and contemporary Andean music.

Quenas (notched-end flutes) remain popular and are traditionally made out of the same aquatic canes as the sikús, although PVC pipe is sometimes used due to its resistance to heat, cold and humidity. Generally, quenas are played only during the dry season, while vertical flutes, either pinkillos or tarkas, are played during the wet season. Tarkas are constructed from local Andean hardwood sources. Marching bands dominated by drums and panpipes are commonplace today and are used to celebrate weddings, carnivals and other holidays.

== Modern history ==
The twentieth century saw drastic changes in Andean society and culture. Bolivia, for example, saw a nationalistic revolution in 1952, leading to increased rights and social awareness for natives. The new government established a folklore department in the Bolivian Ministry of Education and radio stations began broadcasting in Aymara and Quechua.

By 1965, an influential group called Los Jairas formed in La Paz, Bolivia; the quartet fused native sounds into forms suitable for urban Europeans and the middle class. One member of Los Jairas, Gilbert Favre (a Swiss-French flautist) had previously been an acquaintance of the Parras (Ángel, Isabel, and their mother Violeta) in Paris. The Parras eventually began promoting indigenous music in Santiago, Chile. Simon and Garfunkel covered Los Incas song "El Cóndor Pasa" and Andean music became famous around the world.

The late 1960s released native groups such as Ruphay, Grupo Aymara, and the emblematic quechua singer, Luzmila Carpio. Later Chilean groups such as Inti-Illimani and Los Curacas took the fusion work of Los Jairas and the Parras to invent nueva canción, which returned to Bolivia in the 1980s in the form of canto nuevo artists such as Emma Junaro and Matilde Casazola.

The 1970s was a decade in which Andean music saw its biggest growth. Different groups sprang out of the different villages throughout the Andes Region. Peru, Ecuador, Chile, Bolivia, south of Colombia, and northwest Argentina.

Many musicians made their way to the big cities forming different bands and groups. One of the most legendary was Los Kjarkas, from Bolivia, singing and composing songs that became huge hits in Bolivia and would later become Andean standards. They would later take Andean music to the rest of the world.

== Genres and relationships to other musical styles ==
- Carnavalito
- Diablada - From Bolivia
- Morenada - From Bolivia
- Tinku - Originated from Bolivia is the ritual of violent sacrifice to the mother earth to ensure the best look, good fortune and the prosperity of the next seasons crops.
- K'antu - An ancient style of music and circle dance which is widespread since the incaic or even preincaic epoch on the Peruvian and Bolivian highlands.
- San Juanito - Originated in Ecuador, Northern Peru and Southern Colombia, formerly related to solar cult (Inti Raymi)
- Huayno (wayñu) - Originated in colonial Peru as a combination of traditional rural folk music and popular urban dance music. High-pitched vocals are accompanied by a variety of instruments, including quena (flute), harp, siku (panpipe), accordion, saxophone, charango, lute, violin, guitar, and mandolin. Some elements of guayño originate in the music of the pre-Columbian Andes, especially on the territory of former Inca Empire. Huayno utilizes a distinctive rhythm in which the first beat is stressed and followed by two short beats. Huayno has some subgenres: Sikuri, Carnaval Ayacuchano, Hiyawa, Chuscada.
- Harawi - Ancient traditional musical genre and also indigenous lyric poetry. Harawi was widespread in the Inca Empire and now is especially common in countries that were part of it: Peru, Bolivia, Ecuador, partially Chile. Typically, harawi is a moody, soulful slow and melodic song or tune played on the quena.
- Afro-Bolivian Saya
- Chicha - Originated in Peru the late 1980s as a fusion of cumbia and huayno music.
- Huaylía
- Waylas Huaylarsh - Originated in the central andean part of Peru in the Mántaro Valley located in the department of Junín.
- Toril or Waka Taki - Originated from the Department of Apurimac in Peru.
- Chimayche - Performed primarily in the provinces of Sihuas, Pomabamba and Mariscal Luzuriaga in Áncash, Peru
- Cueca
- Qhaswa
- Tarkeada - An aymara musical style played on wooden flutes known as tarkas, common in Bolivia, Puno, Peru and Parinacota, Chile, as well as northern Argentina.
- Huayllacha - From the Colca Canyon in Arequipa
- Marinera - An Afro-Peruvian rhythm.

=== Cumbia ===
Originally from the Caribbean coast of Colombia, cumbia later spread through much of Latin America. In Peru, it developed into a style colloquially known as chicha, which has become a popular style in the Andean region, especially among the lower socioeconomic strata of the society including Quechua and Aymara populations. Several Andean music genres have also borrowed elements originally introduced by the Peruvian cumbia such as electric bass guitars, electronic percussion and little from the original cumbia rhythm.

=== Nueva canción ===
Andean music has served as a major source of inspiration for the neo-folkloric Nueva canción movement that began in the 1960s, Nueva canción musicians both interpreted old songs and created new pieces that are now considered Andean music. Some Nueva canción musicians such as Los Jaivas would fuse Andean music with psychedelic and progressive rock.

=== Rock en español ===
While the rock en español wave of the 1980s and 1990s largely rejected Nueva canción and folklore in favor of hard rock, pop rock, punk, alternative rock and new wave sounds some elements of Andean music has been featured in rock en Español songs such as "Cuando pase el temblor" by Soda Stereo and "Lamento boliviano" by Los Enanitos Verdes.

== Other notable groups and artists ==
Argentina

- Fémina
- Micaela Chauque
- Daniel Tinte

Bolivia

- Bolivia Manta
- Grupo Aymara
- Los Jairas
- Los Kjarkas
- Rumillajta
- Savia Andina

Chile

- Illapu
- Inti-Illimani
- Los Jaivas
- Víctor Jara
- Violeta Parra
- Quilapayún

Colombia

- Géne-sis

Ecuador

- Jayac (band)
- Sisay
- Leo Rojas
- Jatari
- Ñanda Mañachi
- Quichua Marka
- Winiaypa

Peru

- Alborada
- Jaime Guardia
- Damaris
- Martina Portocarrero
- Manuelcha Prado
- Manuel Raygada
- Magaly Solier

Outside the Andes

- Inkuyo
- Los Incas (Urubamba)
- Sukay

== See also ==
- History of folkloric music in Argentina
