= Rumillajta =

Bolivian musical quintet

- Origin: La Paz, Bolivia
- Genres: Andean music
- Instruments: Charango, Charangón; Guitarra; Zampoñas (Chuli, malta, zanka and toyos); Quenas; Quenachos; Bombo, Chajchas
- Years active: 1980–present
- Labels: Discolandia Dueri y Cía; Tumi; Rumillajta Recordings
- Members: Juan Jorge Laura (founder); Leonardo Laura; Cesar Ulloa; Eddy Limachi
- Past members: Víctor Ferrel; Edwin Rowert; Édgar Villarroel; Adrián Villanueva †; Néstor Tintaya; Juan Carlos Cordero; Édgar Montes de Oca; Miguel A. Puña; Max Carlos Ponce; Miguel A. Villanueva; Alejandro Alarcón; Cristian Espinoza; Rene Matias; Mauricio Flores; Efrain Loza

Rumillajta (Quechua: rumi stone, llaqta place (village, city), pronounced ɾʊmɪ'ʎaqta) is a Bolivian musical group that was formed in 1980 by Juan Jorge Laura Quisbert, and became one of the most important progenitors of Andean music. They were the subjects of a short documentary from the BBC and played at festivals on three continents (Asia, Europe and America). Their music concerns folk themes and nature as well as more political themes like foreign exploitation and indigenous rights. The virtuosity, the unique style and innovation with which it presents the music of the high mountains and its warm valleys, have given the group its international prestige as one of the first in the genre of traditional music and as one of the finest and most serious exponents of Andean music.

In 1989, they performed with the Naumburg Orchestral Concerts, in the Naumburg Bandshell, Central Park, in the summer series, on a concert entitled, Music of the Americas.

== Discography ==
Albums

- Pueblo de Piedra (1981)
- Tierra Mestiza (1983)
- City of Stone (1984)
- Hoja De Coca (1984)
- Pachamama (1986)
- Wiracocha (1987)
- Urupampa (1991)
- Atahuallpa (1993)
- Takiririllasu (1995)
- Pachakuti (2001)
