= Inkuyo =

- Origin: California
- Genres: Andean music, world music
- Labels: Fortuna Records, Celestial Harmonies
- Members: Gonzalo Vargas, Enrique Coria, José Luis Reynolds
- Past members: Pamela Darington, Omar Sepulveda, Jorge Tapia
- Website: blacksun.com/biographies/vargas.htm

Inkuyo is a multicultural musical ensemble that performs Andean music arranged by Gonzalo Vargas. Vargas is a multi-instrumentalist, composer, arranger, and record producer. He founded Inkuyo with Pamela Darington, Jorge Tapia, and Omar Sepulveda in the late 1980s. They published their debut album, Land of the Incas, in 1990. Inkuyo's most recent album is Pachakuti: The Overturning Of Space-Time, released in 2007.

"Wipala", the first track on their debut album, serves as a backdrop to the "Brazil Favela" segment of Ron Fricke's 1992 film Baraka.

Inkuyo's namesake is a particular village in the Andes.
