= Ernesto Cavour =

Bolivian singer (1940–2022)

- Born: Ernesto Cavour Aramayo; 9 April 1940; La Paz, Bolivia
- Died: 7 August 2022 (aged 82) La Paz, Bolivia
- Genres: Folk, nueva canción, Andean music
- Occupations: Singer, musician, inventor of musical instruments
- Instrument: Charango
- Years active: 1957–2022
- Label: Polydor Records
- Website: ernestocavour.com

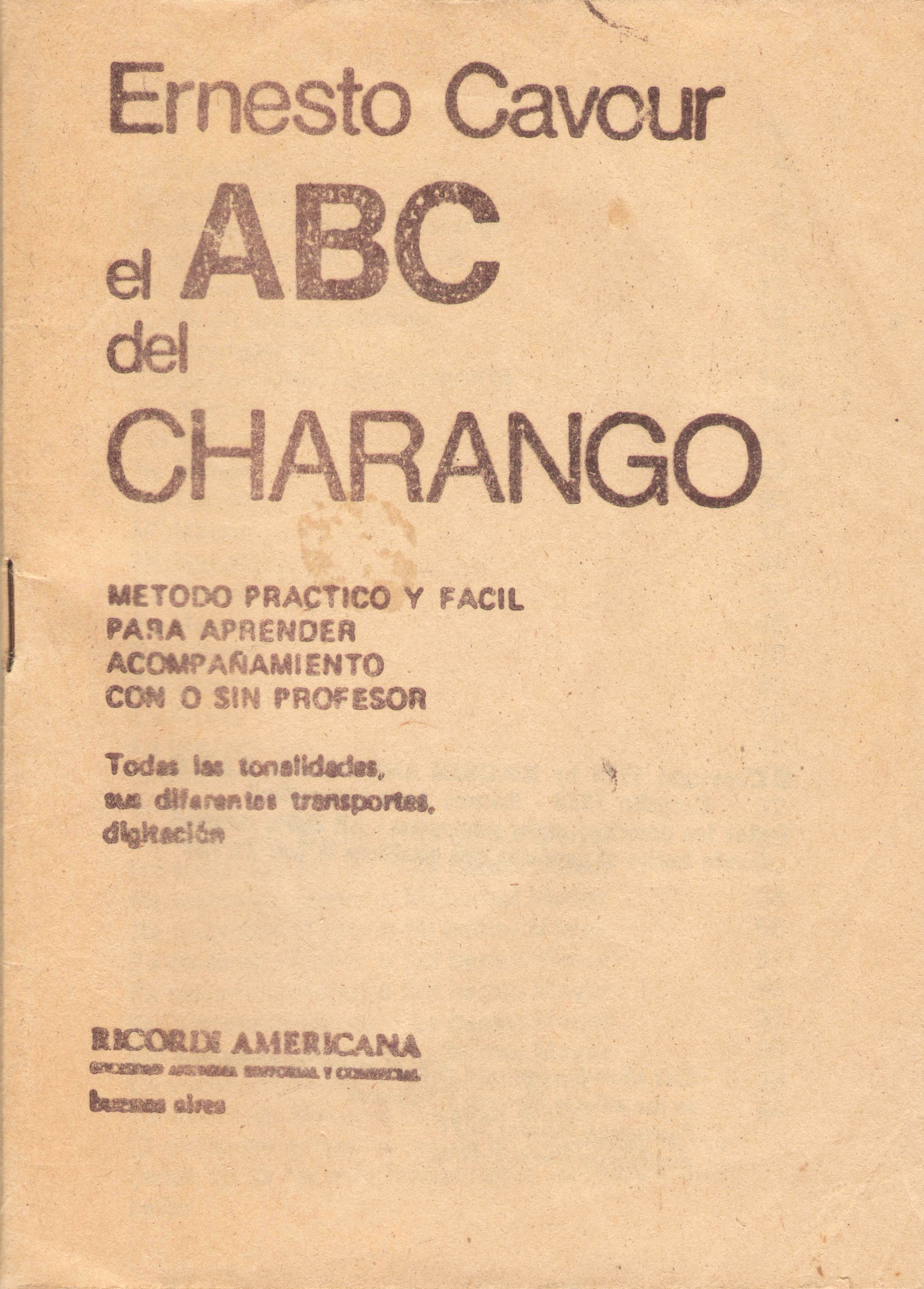
El ABC del charango
by Ernesto Cavour

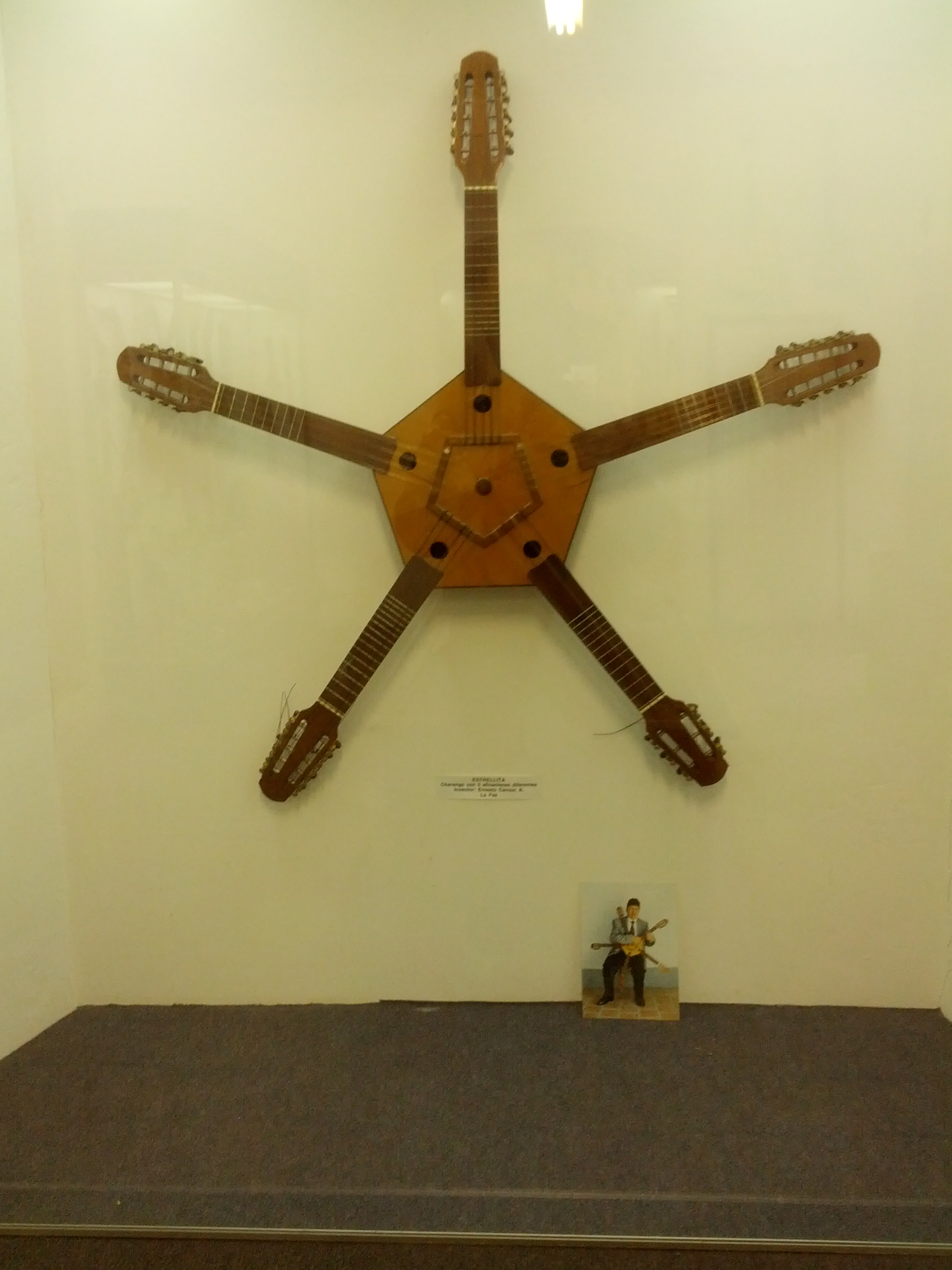
Estrellita
5-neck charango with
other Bolivian instruments, invented by Ernesto Cavour

Ernesto Cavour Aramayo (9 April 1940 – 7 August 2022) was a Bolivian singer, musician, inventor of musical instruments, and author of Bolivian music teaching books. He was a founding member of the group Los Jairas.

In 1962, Cavour founded the Museo del charango in La Paz, which ultimately became the Museo de Instrumentos Musicales de Bolivia. The museum contains 2000 musical instruments, both Bolivian and international, including some of Cavour's creation. The Museum also includes the Teatro del Charango, a performance space where Cavour himself regularly performed.

In 2013, he received the Order of the Condor of the Andes. He received Bolivia's National Culture Award in 2018.

He died on 7 August 2022, at the age of 82.
