= Sikuri =

Music genre

Traditional sikuri,
(MIDI sample)
as played by Inkuyo group
(The Double-Headed Serpent, 1993)

Sikuri is a musical style from Bolivia and Peru consisting of siku players and drum accompaniment. There are usually around twenty siku players. As each siku cannot play all the notes of a scale, the siku players use an interlocking technique to play the entire melody. The drums produce a fast, pounding beat in the rhythm of huayño.

Sikuri is often performed at festivals by the Aymara-speaking peoples near Lake Titicaca.
