= Sukay =

Andean folk music band

Sukay is an Andean folk music band.

== History ==
Sukay, an international touring musical group, is known in the United States for bringing the music of the Andes for the first time to cities and concert stages throughout North America. The group's name came from the ancient language and culture of the Quechua of the central Andes, and it means “to open the earth and make it ready for planting”.

For 25 years before the opening of Peña Pachamama in San Francisco in the late '90s, SUKAY had appeared on hundreds of the great stages across America including New York's Carnegie Hall, Lincoln Center's Avery Fisher Hall, Colorado's Red Rocks Amphitheater, San Francisco's Herbst Theatre, Masonic Auditorium, Washington DC's Lisner Auditorium and Smithsonian's Baird Auditorium, Hartford, Alberta, Detroit Institute of Arts, MI, and Centennial Hall, AZ, Spivey Hall, GA, Jack Singer Concert Hall in Calgary, Wilder Hall at Oberlin College, OH, Zellerbach Hall, Berkeley CA, Chautauqua Institution Amphitheater, NY, Zion National Park, UT and the Colisée in Quebec City (opening for Peter Gabriel and Genesis). The group also appeared at major festivals in Vancouver, Calgary, Winnipeg and Toronto, at Pete Seeger's Clearwater Festival and countless other venues.

Sukay recorded twenty-four albums. Among the Andean legends joining them were Yuri Ortuño “the Plácido Domingo of Bolivia”, Savia Andina’s renowned wind instrumentalist Alcides Mejia, Argentine guitarist Enrique Coria and Eddy Navia, one of Bolivia's beloved charangists. Eddy went on to become Sukay's artistic director and husband of Sukay's co-founder Quentin H Navia. In the mid-'70s, Eddy had Eric Clapton status in his native country. The music of his band stayed atop the South America Top 40 charts, and several of their 35 album recordings on CBS and RCA went gold.

A midi rendition of Pacha Siku, a song by Sukay recorded in 1978

Sukay was founded in 1975 by quena player Quentin H Navia and Edmond Badoux, and she is the band's only remaining original member. In 1978 the group brought pan-pipe player Gonzalo Vargas from Bolivia and together with Bolivian guitarist Javier Canelas the group became a quartet. Gonzalo Vargas left Sukay in 1984 and in the late 80s formed his group Inkuyo with another musician who toured with Sukay, Omar Sepulveda. Renowned Bolivian composer and charango player Eddy Navia joined Sukay in 1989.

Eddy & Quentin Navia founded the Peña Pachamama in San Francisco, CA, which for the past 22 years has become a gathering place for great world music artists.

Quentin & Eddy Navia are the owners of the copyright and publishing rights of all recordings of Sukay, Eddy Navia, Savia Andina Classics 1, 2 and 3, Great Instrumentals of Bolivia, Pachamama (the call and the entire Discography below). Flying Fish (Bruce Kaplan was a friend of the group) only leased and distributed a few albums that were produced completely by SUKAY WORLD MUSIC.

== Discography ==
- Music of the Andes (1976) - Sukay World Music
- Pacha Siku (1978) - Aural Tradition Records
- Socavon (1985) - Sukay World Music
- Tutayay (1986) - Sukay World Music
- Mama Luna (1987) - Sukay World Music
- Huayrasan (1988) - Sukay World Music
- Sukay Instrumental (1988) - Sukay Records
- Cumbre (The Summit) (1990) - Sukay Records
- Return of the Inca (1991) - Sukay Records
- Navidad Andina (Christmas) (1993) - Sukay Records
- Savia Andina Classics 1
- Savia Andina Classics 2
- Savia Andina Classics 3
- Encuentros (Meetings) (1995) - Sukay Records
- Love Songs of the Andes, Yuri Ortuño and Quentin Navia (1995) - Sukay Records
- Andean Guitar Instrumental
- Pachamama La Llamada, The Call (1999) - Sukay Records
- Andean Pan Pipes - Sukay World Music
- Eddy Navia En Charango - Sukay World Music
- Eddy Navia Mozart En Machu Picchu - Sukay World Music
- Eddy Navia World Instrumentals - Sukay World Music
- Piano Charango Chuchito Valdés & Eddy Navia - Sukay World Music – nominated for a Latin Grammy
- Carnaval en Piano Charango - Sukay World Music – nominated for a second Latin Grammy
- Chuchito Valdés & Eddy Navia - Sukay World Music
- Great Instrumentals of Bolivia - Sukay World Music
