= Savia Andina =

Savia Andina is an Andean folk music ensemble from Bolivia, and it was founded in 1975. The group originated in 1964 as schoolmates Gerardo Arias, Eddy Navia and Oscar Castro formed the rock band "Los Rebeldes" in the city of Potosí. Following some records by Arias and Navia in Argentina in the early 1970s they invited Castro back and others to officially form Savia Andina in July 1975. Savia Andina was one of the first groups to have international success with traditional Andean music. They had this success starting in the 1960s and went on to have three albums to go gold. They toured Europe and are sometimes classed in the "new song/nueva cancion" movement of Latin American music. In the 1970s they became the most popular and influential music group in Bolivia, but were later displaced by Los Kjarkas. They are also known for poetic love songs about mountains. Eddy Navia, a founder of the group noted as a charango player, left in 1988 to join Sukay.

== Discography ==
Contributing artist

- The Rough Guide to the Music of the Andes (1996, World Music Network)
