= Huayno =

Genre of Andean music and dance

- Other names: Huaino
- Stylistic origins: Andean music; Inca music
- Cultural origins: 20th Century, Andean Countries
- Typical instruments: Classical guitar; bass guitar; quena; zampoña; violin; harp
- Derivative forms: Chicha

Subgenres
- Ayacuchan Carnival; Hiyawa

Huayno (Waynu in Quechua) is a genre of popular Andean music and dance. It is especially common in Peru, western Bolivia, northwest Argentina and northern Chile, and is popular among the indigenous peoples, especially the Quechua people. The history of Huayno dates back to colonial Peru as a combination of traditional rural folk music and popular urban dance music. High-pitched vocals are accompanied by a variety of instruments, including quena (flute), harp, siku (panpipe), accordion, saxophone, charango, lute, violin, guitar, and mandolin. Some elements of huayno originate in the music of the pre-Columbian Andes, especially on the territory of the former Inca Empire. Huayno utilizes a distinctive rhythm in which the first beat is stressed and followed by two short beats.

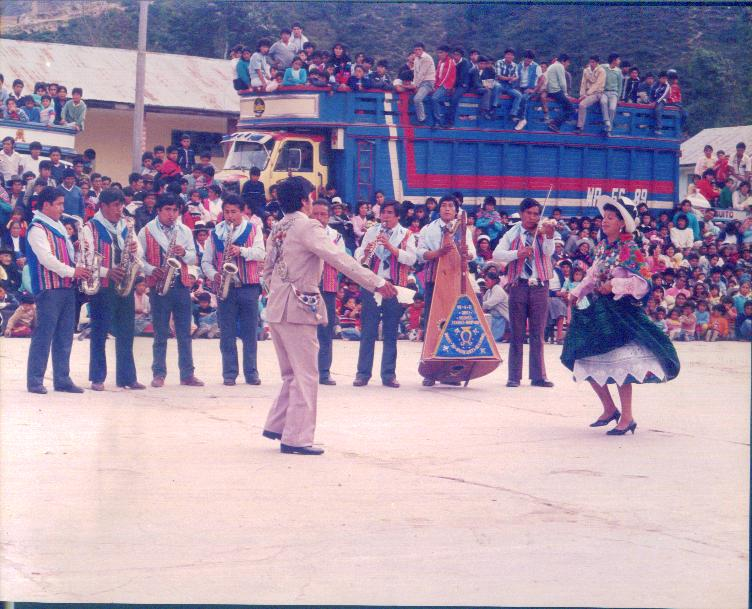
Huayno players and dancers in Peru

== Subgenres ==
- Carnaval Ayacuchano, a holiday genre from the Ayacucho Region, Peru
- Hiyawa or hiyaway (Quechua: hiyawa(y), Spanish: jiyawa(y), jiyahua(y)), a dry-season ritual song and dance from north of Potosí Department, Bolivia

== Dance ==
The dance begins with the man offering his right arm to the woman as an invitation for her to dance (there is even a special word for this action, Quechua: wayñukuy "to invite woman to dance a wayñu"). Alternatively, he puts his handkerchief on the shoulder of the woman. Next, the partners walk along an enclosure, and finally they dance. The dance consists of an agile and vigorous stamping of the feet during which the man follows the woman, opposite to front, touching her with his shoulders after having turned around, and only occasionally he touches his right arm to the left hand of his partner while both swing to the rhythm of the music. His movements are happy and roguish.

== Notable examples ==
- "Valicha" by Miguel Angel Hurtado
- "Ojos azules" by Gilberto Rojas Enríquez
- "El Cóndor Pasa" by Daniel Alomía Robles, (second part, with high tempo, the first part is harawi)
- "Vírgenes del Sol" by Jorge Bravo de Rueda
- "Adiós pueblo de Ayacucho"
- "Wasimasillay" by José Sanchez Yañac of Los Bohemios del Cusco.
