= Siku (instrument) =

Traditional Andean pan flute

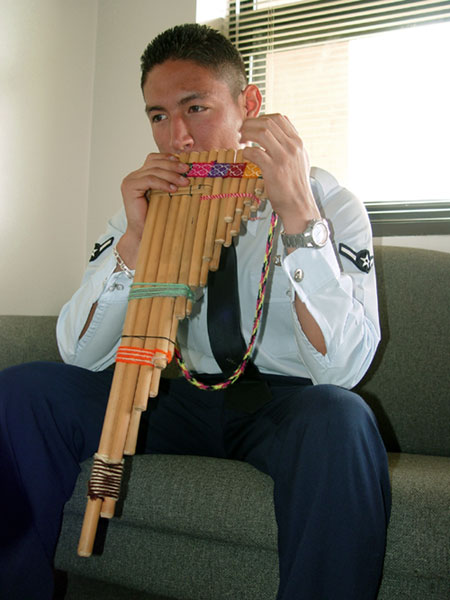
Peruvian male playing a zampoña

A sikuri, played in hocket, with multiple instruments sharing the melody. Computer-generated file.

Siku performance by a street performer in Japan

Siku or sicu/sicus (Quechua: antara; Aymara: siku; Spanish: zampoña or zampolla) is a traditional Andean panpipe. This instrument is the main instrument used in a musical genre known as sikuri. It is traditionally found across the Andes but is more typically associated with music from the Kollasuyo, or Aymara speaking regions around Lake Titicaca. Historically, because of the complex mountain geography among other factors, some regions in each community would develop their own type of siku, with its own special tuning, shape and size. Additionally each community developed its own style of playing. The modern siku has been standardized for compatibility with Western music, transformed from its traditional roots.

== History ==
The siku (panpipe) is originally from the Aymaras of Peru and Bolivia, where a woman would play her siku as she came down from the mountains. Since the largest siku has every note (A-G), and was too big for the woman, they often got two sikus (usually smaller ones) that would be played together with someone else, so they could play them continuously after each other and thus the scales could fully be played. Once the women partnered, they then became musically bonded with each other, as part of their religion, and neither could play the pipes with any other for the rest of their life.

Women would also assemble into groups as they came down the mountains, each group would play different tunes, and as they got together, they would blend all the melodies together to create one complete melody. The woman also played the siku to attract wild goat that they would then harvest.

== Design ==
Sikus are typically made from bamboo shoots, but have also been made from condor feathers, bone, and many other materials. Additionally, different types of bamboo are employed to change the quality of the sound. Songo, or shallow-walled bamboo, gives a louder, more resonant sound than regular deep-walled bamboo, but is less common due to its fragility.

The antara are traditionally made from a type of cane known as chuki or chajlla (Arundo donax) that grows in the ceja de la selva, literally "the eyebrow of the forest". The pipes are held together by one or two strips of cane (ties) to form a trapezoidal plane (like a raft). Antaras are of different sizes and they produce diverse sounds.

Siku is split across two rows of pipes. One must alternate rows with every note in order to play a complete scale. Traditionally, two musicians were required to play the siku, each one taking one row of the instrument. One part of the instrument is called ira, another arka. It is considered that spiritually ira corresponds to male principle and arka to female. When many musicians divide in two parts, first playing ira and second playing arka, this gives Andean music a distinctive stereophonic sound. Hear example.

Now it is more common to see one musician playing both rows of the instrument together, but rustic ensembles retain traditional playing.

== Varieties ==
The most widespread variety of siku, siku ch'alla, contains 13 pipes (6 in ira and 7 in arka), but less common varieties may have more and fewer pipes. Some of them employ extra open-ended reeds attached to the front of the instrument to change the sound quality. The tabla siku has all of the pipes cut to the same length, so the instrument is rectangular in shape but has stoppers inside the tubes to adjust the actual resonant length of the chambers.

== Scale and tuning ==
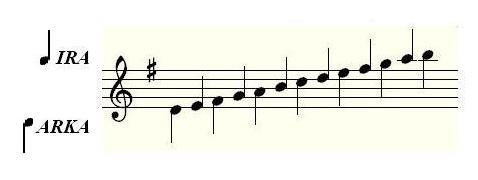

The siku uses a diatonic scale. Siku ch'alla is tuned in E minor / G major, arka: D-F^{#}-A-C-E-G-B and ira:E-G-B-D-F^{#}-A.

There are a contemporary varieties of siku with chromatic scale having 3 rows, with pitch distribution similar to chromatic button accordion.
