= List of number-one singles of 1989 (France) =

This is a list of the French SNEP Top 100 Singles number-ones of 1989.

== Summary ==
=== Singles Chart ===
Week	Issue Date	Artist	Single
1	7 January	David Hallyday	"High"
2	14 January	David Hallyday	"High"
3	21 January	David Hallyday	"High"
4	28 January	David Hallyday	"High"
5	4 February	David Hallyday	"High"
6	11 February	Charles Aznavour and various artists	"Pour toi Arménie"
7	18 February	Charles Aznavour and various artists	"Pour toi Arménie"
8	25 February	Charles Aznavour and various artists	"Pour toi Arménie"
9	4 March	Charles Aznavour and various artists	"Pour toi Arménie"
10	11 March	Charles Aznavour and various artists	"Pour toi Arménie"
11	18 March	Charles Aznavour and various artists	"Pour toi Arménie"
12	25 March	Charles Aznavour and various artists	"Pour toi Arménie"
13	1 April	Charles Aznavour and various artists	"Pour toi Arménie"
14	8 April	Charles Aznavour and various artists	"Pour toi Arménie"
15	15 April	Charles Aznavour and various artists	"Pour toi Arménie"
16	22 April	Boney M	"Megamix"
17	29 April	Boney M	"Megamix"
18	6 May	Boney M	"Megamix"
19	13 May	Boney M	"Megamix"
20	20 May	Boney M	"Megamix"
21	27 May	Boney M	"Megamix"
22	3 June	Avalanche	"Johnny, Johnny Come Home"
23	10 June	Avalanche	"Johnny, Johnny Come Home"
24	17 June	Avalanche	"Johnny, Johnny Come Home"
25	24 June	Avalanche	"Johnny, Johnny Come Home"
26	1 July	Avalanche	"Johnny, Johnny Come Home"
27	8 July	Avalanche	"Johnny, Johnny Come Home"
28	15 July	Avalanche	"Johnny, Johnny Come Home"
29	22 July	Avalanche	"Johnny, Johnny Come Home"
30	29 July	Kaoma	"Lambada"
31	5 August	Kaoma	"Lambada"
32	12 August	Kaoma	"Lambada"
33	19 August	Kaoma	"Lambada"
34	26 August	Kaoma	"Lambada"
35	2 September	Kaoma	"Lambada"
36	9 September	Kaoma	"Lambada"
37	16 September	Kaoma	"Lambada"
38	23 September	Kaoma	"Lambada"
39	30 September	Kaoma	"Lambada"
40	7 October	Kaoma	"Lambada"
41	14 October	Kaoma	"Lambada"
42	21 October	Philippe Lafontaine	"Cœur de loup"
43	28 October	Philippe Lafontaine	"Cœur de loup"
44	4 November	Jive Bunny and the Mastermixers	"Swing the Mood"
45	11 November	Jive Bunny and the Mastermixers	"Swing the Mood"
46	18 November	Jive Bunny and the Mastermixers	"Swing the Mood"
47	25 November	Jive Bunny and the Mastermixers	"Swing the Mood"
48	2 December	Jive Bunny and the Mastermixers	"Swing the Mood"
49	9 December	Roch Voisine	"Hélène"
50	16 December	Roch Voisine	"Hélène"
51	23 December	Roch Voisine	"Hélène"
52	30 December	Roch Voisine	"Hélène"

== See also ==
- 1989 in music
- List of number-one hits (France)
- List of artists who reached number one on the French Singles Chart
