= Cœur de loup =

1989 single by Philippe Lafontaine

Single by Philippe Lafontaine

from the album Fa ma no ni ma
- B-side: "Et dire..."
- Released: July 1989
- Recorded: 1989
- Studio: Studio Hysteresis (recording); Studio de l'Hacienda (mixing)
- Genre: Pop, chanson
- Length: 3:30
- Label: Vogue
- Songwriters: Philippe Lafontaine, Juan D'Oultremont
- Producers: Philippe Lafontaine, Alain Pierre

Philippe Lafontaine singles chronology
"Paramour" (1987)	"Cœur de loup" (1989)	"Alexis m'attends" (1990)

"Cœur de loup" is a 1978 pop song recorded by Belgian singer Philippe Lafontaine. It was the first single from his 1989 album Fa ma no ni ma on which it appears as the sixth track, and was released in July 1989 (though the song was first on Lafontaine's 1988 album Affaire (À suivre)). It achieved success in France where it topped the chart, became a popular song throughout years and can be considered as Lafontaine's signature song.

== Background and release ==
"Cœur de loup" was first released in 1978, but achieved success 11 years later after being reissued. Creator of the Studios de l'Hacienda Jean Gamet explained that in the first quarter of 1989, artistic director of Vogue Hugues de Courson asked him to try to mix "Cœur de loup"; Gamet and Stéphane Piot did it in only one day, then sent the cassette to the French four major radio stations (RTL, Europe 1, France Inter and RMC) which aired the song for the first time four days later. Gamet only met Lafontaine one month later, after the song's release.

== Music and lyrics ==
According to expert of French charts Elia Habib, "the words are merging into their sound to become music, the assonances and alliterations are shaped like clay, the syllables are uniting in onomatopoeia".

== Critical reception ==
"Cœur de loup" helped Lafontaine to obtain a Victoire de la musique, which he refused. Habib considered the song as "an admirable game of mischievous puns" and "a brilliant song of mischief", noting its "remarkable" writing and composition. However, in Canada, the song raised a controversy, being accused by feminists of being a call for rape, as a phrase says "the victim is so beautiful and the crime is so joyful"; accordingly, Lafontaine was asked to clarify the meaning of these words. According to Claire Barrois of 20 Minutes, "Coeur de loup"" is characterized by the typical sound of the 1980s... The rhythm, the melody, everything is dated, of course, but from an excellent vintage"; she also refuted the rape allegations as a phrase says "as long as she wants", which implies the woman's sexual consent.

== Chart performance ==
In France, "Cœur de loup" debuted at number 41 on the chart edition of 12 August 1989, entered the top ten in its fourth week and remained there for 14 weeks; it topped the chart for two weeks, in its 11th and 12th weeks, replacing at this position Kaoma's massive hit "Lambada"; then it dropped rather quickly and fell off the top 50 straight from number 27 after 20 weeks of presence. It was awarded Gold disc by the Syndicat National de l'Édition Phonographique. In addition, it reached number 44 in Belgium (Flanders). On the European Hot 100 Singles, it started at number 48 on 16 September 1989 and reached a peak of number 12 for non consecutive three weeks. Much played on radio, it charted for 11 weeks on the European Airplay Top 50, with a peak at number 15 on 21 October 1989.

== Cover versions ==
In 2012, contestant of The Voice Belgique Renato Bennardo covered "Cœur de loup"; available digitally, his version reached number nine on the Walloon chart of Belgium and charted in the top 50 for four weeks.

== Track listings ==
- 7" single - France, Belgium, Canada
1. "Cœur de loup" — 3:30
2. "Et dire..." — 4:00
- 12" maxi - France
1. "Cœur de loup" (remix) — 5:00
2. "Cœur de loup" — 3:42
3. "Et dire..." — 4:26
- 12" maxi - Canada
1. "Cœur de loup" — 3:40
2. "Tout me rappelle tout" — 3:20
- CD maxi - France
1. "Cœur de loup" (remix) — 5:00
2. "Cœur de loup" — 3:42
3. "Et dire..." — 4:26
4. "Paramour" — 3:26

== Credits ==
- Photo — Marina Cox
- Mixing — Stéphane [Piot]
- Layout — York Penno / O.Z.

== Charts ==
=== Weekly charts ===
Chart (1989)	Peak position
Belgium (Ultratop 50 Flanders)	44
Europe (European Airplay Top 50)	15
Europe (European Hot 100)	12
France (Airplay Chart [AM Stations])	1
France (SNEP)	1
Quebec (ADISQ)	1

=== Year-end charts ===
Chart (1989)	Position
Europe (European Hot 100)	58

=== Certifications ===
Certifications for "Cœur de loup"
Region	Certification	Certified units/sales
France (SNEP)	Gold	400,000^{*}
^{*} Sales figures based on certification alone.

== Release history ==
Country	Date	Format	Label
France	1989	CD maxi	Vogue
France	1989	7" single	Vogue
France	1989	12" single	Vogue
Belgium	1989	7" single	Promax
Canada	1989	7" single	Hello
Canada	1989	12" maxi	Hello

== See also ==
- List of number-one singles of 1989 (France)
