= Frente a frente (song) =

1990 single by Chico & Roberta

Single by Chico & Roberta

from the album Frente a frente
- B-side: "Feijāo"
- Released: 1990
- Recorded: 1990
- Genre: Latino, Worldbeat
- Length: 3:30 (single version); 3:43 (album version)
- Label: Carrere
- Songwriters: Chico & Roberta, Loalwa Braz, Daniel Darras, Alain Pyge
- Producer: Jean-Claude Bonaventure

Chico & Roberta singles chronology
"Frente a frente" (1990)	"Natal" (1991)

"Frente a frente" is a 1990 song recorded by Brazilian duet Chico & Roberta. Written by Chico & Roberta and Loalwa Braz with a music by Daniel Darras and Alain Pyge, and produced by Jean-Claude Bonaventure, who previously produced Kaoma's "Lambada", it was the debut single from the band's first album Frente a frente, released in 1991, on which it appears as the first track. It was successful, becoming a top five hit.

According to Elia Habib, an expert of the French chart, "Frente a frente" has a "sunny melody" which recalled Dalida's 1976 hit single "Bésame Mucho".

== Chart performance ==
"Frente a frente" first charted in the Netherlands, in August and September 1990, remaining for eight weeks on the Dutch Single Top 100 with a peak of number 36 in its fifth week of presence. In France, it debuted at number 37 on the chart edition of 20 October 1990, reached the top ten five weeks later, peaked at number five for non-consecutive three weeks, and totalled 17 weeks in the top twenty and 25 weeks in the top 50, thus becoming the band's longest single chart run. It achieved Gold status, awarded by the Syndicat National de l'Édition Phonographique, the French certificator, for over 400,000 units sold. It charted for 18 weeks on the Eurochart Hot 100 and peaked at number 29 in its seventh week.

== Track listings ==
- CD single - France, Germany
1. "Frente a frente" (extended version) — 6:10
2. "Frente a frente" (single version) — 3:30
3. "Feijão" — 3:50
- 7" single - France, Germany, Denmark, Italy, Portugal
1. "Frente a frente" (single version) — 3:30
2. "Feijão" — 3:50
- 12" maxi - Spain, Italy
1. "Frente a frente" (extended version) — 6:10
2. "Feijão" — 3:50
- 12" maxi - France, Greece
1. "Frente a frente" (extended version) — 6:10
2. "Frente a frente" (single version) — 3:30
- Promo 12" maxi - Mexico
1. "Frente a frente" (single version) — 3:30
2. "Frente a frente" (album version) — 3:43
- Promo 7" single - Costa Rica
1. "Frente a frente" (album version) — 3:43

== Charts and sales ==
=== Weekly charts ===
Chart (1990–1991)	Peak position
Europe (Eurochart Hot 100)	29
France (SNEP)	5
Netherlands (Single Top 100)	36

=== Certifications ===
Certifications for "Frente a frente"
Region	Certification	Certified units/sales
France (SNEP)	Gold	400,000^{*}
^{*} Sales figures based on certification alone.

== Release history ==
Country	Date	Format	Label
Europe	1990	CD single	Carrere
Europe	1990	7" single	Carrere
Europe	1990	12" maxi	Carrere
Mexico	1990	Promo 12" maxi	CBS
Costa Rica	1990	Promo 7" single	CBS
