= Johnny, Johnny Come Home =

Single by Avalanche
- B-side: "Dance mix"
- Released: 1989
- Genre: Synthpop, dance
- Length: 4:18
- Label: Warner Music, Wea
- Songwriters: Kjetil Rosnes, Vinton Hoover
- Producer: Vinton Hoover

Avalanche singles chronology
"Johnny, Johnny Come Home" (1989)	"I Will Wait" (1989)

"Johnny, Johnny Come Home" is a 1989 song recorded by Norwegian band Avalanche. It was their debut single and can be considered as its signature song. Released in March 1989, it helped launch the band’s career, topping the singles chart in France and reaching number three in Norway. The song also peaked at number two on the Music & Media European Hot 100.

== Background and release ==
Written by Vinton Hoover and Avalanche's member Kjetil Rosnes, "Johnny Johnny Come Home" was published twice: first in late 1988, with a red cover single, then in March 1989 with a blue one containing a new remix. The refrain is composed of the title repeated eight times and many onomatopoeias ("Na na na na na na na na na na na na na na na"). Two songs with almost the same title, "Johnny Come Home", by Fine Young Cannibals in 1985, then by The Men They Couldn't Hang in 1987, are not related to Avalanche's one.

== Chart performance ==
In France, "Johnny, Johnny Come Home" debuted at number 43 on the chart edition of 1 April 1989, and climbed regularly until reaching the top ten in its sixth week. It topped the chart from it tenth week and remained there for eight consecutive weeks before being dislodged by Kaoma's massive summer hit "Lambada"; then it almost did not stop to drop and totaled 17 weeks in the top ten and 26 weeks in the top 50. In Norway, the song was ranked in the top ten for eleven weeks from the 27th week of 1989, including a peak at number three in its sixth week. The song was also released in Germany, but failed to reach the chart. On the European Hot 100 Singles, it debuted at number 98 on 28 April 1989, reached number two in its 15th week, being blocked from the number one slot by Sonia's "You'll Never Stop Me Loving You", and spent 23 weeks on the chart, eight of them in the top ten.

== Track listings ==
- 7" single - France, Germany
1. "Johnny, Johnny Come Home" — 4:14
2. "Johnny, Johnny Come Home" (dance mix) — 4:03
- CD single - Germany
1. "Johnny, Johnny Come Home" — 8:38
2. "Johnny, Johnny Come Home" (single version) — 4:14
3. "Johnny, Johnny Come Home" (dance mix) — 4:03
- 12" maxi - Germany
1. "Johnny, Johnny Come Home" — 8:38
2. "Johnny, Johnny Come Home" (dub, instrumental version) — 3:35
3. "Johnny, Johnny Come Home" (dance mix) — 4:03
- 12" maxi - New mix 1989 summer - France
1. "Johnny, Johnny Come Home" (special version) — 9:20
2. "Johnny, Johnny Come Home" (special radio edit) — 4:14
3. "Return of Johnny" (instrumental) — 4:04

== Versions ==
- Radio Edit
- Dance mix
- Dub instrumental version
- Special version
- Special radio edit
- New mix

== Credits ==
- Arranged by Kjetil Rosnes
- Programmed and engineered by Joey Wild
- Mixed by Frankie Rynke
- Producerd by Vinton Hoover
- Cover : F.Gaillard

== Charts ==
=== Weekly charts ===
Chart (1989)	Peak position
Europe (European Hot 100)	2
France (Airplay Chart [AM Stations])	3
France (SNEP)	1
Israel (IBA)	1
Norway (VG-lista)	3

=== Year-end charts ===
Chart (1989)	Position
Europe (Eurochart Hot 100)	28
France (SNEP)	3
Israel (IBA)	8

== Certifications ==
Certifications for "Johnny, Johnny Come Home"
Region	Certification	Certified units/sales
France (SNEP)	Gold	600,000

== See also ==
- List of number-one hits of 1989 (France)
