= Chico & Roberta =

Brazilian dance duo

- Origin: Bahia, Brazil
- Genre: Lambada
- Years active: 1989–1993
- Label: Carrere Records
- Members: Washington "Chico" Oliveira, Roberta de Brito

Chico & Roberta was a music and dance duo founded in 1989 consisting of two Brazilian children, Washington "Chico" Oliveira, also known as Uoston and Voston, and Roberta de Brito. The duo's first appearance was in the 1989 video clip of "Lambada". In 1990 they released the album Frente a Frente (Face to Face in Portuguese.) The album was certified gold. After initial success, the duo disbanded in 1993.

== History ==
Washington "Chico" Oliveira, also known as Uoston and Voston, was born February 20, 1979, in Eunápolis; Roberta de Brito was born April 27, 1979, in Brasília.

The duo first appeared in the video clip of "Lambada" by the French-Brazilian group Kaoma in 1989. Both Kaoma and Chico & Roberta had the same producer, Jean-Claude Bonaventure, and the duo's songs were composed by Kaoma's lead singer Loalwa Braz, with contributions by Daniel Darras, Alan Pype, Bonaventure, M. Nogueira, and Roberta and Chico themselves.

At the end of 1990, Chico & Roberta had their first success with the album Frente a Frente (Face to Face), which was certified gold by the French certification group SNEP and contained their first two singles, "Frente a Frente" and "Esperança do Natal" (a Christmas song).

Chico & Roberta recorded their songs in Portuguese, and they performed on television programs in various countries, including Brazil, France, the UAE and Italy.

After their initial success, however, the children's musical career suddenly stopped. Chico became pastor of a Protestant church and currently lives in Espírito Santo with his wife and daughter, working in a mission in Vila Velha. Roberta is an actress and assistant director, known for Isi/Disi - Amor a lo bestia (2004).

== Discography ==
=== Singles ===
- "Frente a Frente" (1990) - #5 in France
- "Esperança do Natal" (1991) - #3 in France
- "Dança Do La La La" (1991)
- "Festa no Mar" (1992) - #18 in France

=== Album ===
- Frente a Frente (1990)
