= On the Floor =

2011 single by Jennifer Lopez

Single by Jennifer Lopez featuring Pitbull

from the album Love?
- Released: February 8, 2011
- Recorded: 2010
- Studio: Cove Studio (New York); Henson (Los Angeles); Al Burna (Davie); Et Al Indamix (Dominican Republic)
- Genre: Dance-pop; Latin; pop; house; techno
- Length: 4:44; 3:51 (radio edit)
- Label: Island
- Songwriters: Nadir Khayat; Kinnda Hamid; Achraf Janussi; Bilal Hajji; Armando Perez; Gonzalo Hermosa; Ulises Hermosa
- Producer: RedOne

Jennifer Lopez singles chronology
"Louboutins" (2009)	"On the Floor" (2011)	"I'm Into You" (2011)

Pitbull singles chronology
"Hey Baby (Drop It to the Floor)" (2010)	"On the Floor" (2011)	"Tu Cuerpo" (2011)

Music video
- "On the Floor" on YouTube

"On the Floor" is a song recorded by American singer Jennifer Lopez for her seventh studio album, Love? (2011). Featuring American rapper Pitbull, it was released by Island Records on February 8, 2011, as the lead single from the album. "On the Floor" was written by Kinnda "Kee" Hamid, AJ Junior, Teddy Sky, Bilal "The Chef" Hajji, Pitbull, Gonzalo Hermosa, Ulises Hermosa, along with the song's producer RedOne. It is a pop song combining Latin, dance-pop, house and techno music and with a common time tempo of 130 beats per minute. Lopez recorded a Spanish-language version of the song titled "Ven a Bailar" (English: "Come Dance"), which includes additional lyrical contributions from Julio Reyes Copello and Jimena Romero.

The song's development was motivated by Lopez's Latin heritage and pays homage to her career-beginnings as a dancer. Interpolated within the song are recurrent elements of the 1982 Bolivian composition "Llorando se fue" written by Gonzalo and Ulises Hermosa of Los Kjarkas, a composition that gained notoriety when it was covered by Kaoma in their 1989 single "Lambada". Lopez described "On the Floor" as an evolution of her classic sound and as something which sounded very current. The debut and release of "On the Floor" coincided with Lopez's appointment as a judge on the tenth season of US reality TV show American Idol, as well as several other product endorsement deals. American Idol also provided a platform to debut the single's music video, as well as the stage for Lopez's first live performance of the song.

Editors from BBC Music and Los Angeles Times drew comparisons to Lopez's debut single, "If You Had My Love" (1999) and follow-up single "Waiting for Tonight" (1999). In the United States, it was Lopez's first single in six years to garner significant airplay, and has gone on to sell 3.8 million copies, earning an eight-times platinum certification by the Recording Industry Association of America (RIAA). It was ranked by Billboard as the eleventh-biggest hit of 2011 on the year-end Billboard Hot 100 chart. "On the Floor" was a monster hit reaching the top spot in 37 countries and finished in first in Austria, Finland, France, Germany, Spain, Switzerland, and other countries. The single sold 13 million copies worldwide in 2011, and over 17 million to date, becoming the best-selling single of that year and one of the best-selling digital singles of all time.

A music video was directed by TAJ Stansberry and choreographed by Frank Gatson Jr, with fans being given the chance to vote for their preferred ending for the video. The completed clip premiered simultaneously on Vevo and during the March 3, 2011 episode of American Idol. It depicts a Los Angeles underground club culture where Lopez portrays a "queen of the nightclub", among other characters. The video received critical acclaim for its lavish production, styling, and choreography, all of which critics felt highlighted Lopez's skills as a dancer.

== Background ==
Let's face it: With J.Lo, you have to go big or go home, to make a song that sounded right for Lopez [we] would need "dance, parties and her Latina heritage. She's a dancer. She can sing. I was really amazed, and I had so much fun working with her, her energy, and everything about her is a star, and it was natural for me to do what we did

— Producer RedOne speaking to MTV News about collaborating with Lopez.

Lopez's seventh studio album Love? (2011) was conceived in late 2007 and early 2008. During that time frame, under contract to Epic Records, Lopez released "Louboutins", a song written and produced by The-Dream and Tricky Stewart, as the project's lead single. However upon release, the song failed to garner enough airplay to chart, despite topping the US Billboard Hot Dance Club Songs chart. Lopez subsequently left Epic Records, citing that she had fulfilled her contractual obligations and now wished to release Love? under a new label. Upon signing with The Island Def Jam Music Group, Lopez continued working with The-Dream and Tricky Stewart, in addition to collaborating with new producers such as RedOne. It was not until January 2011 that Lopez teased the media about the new lead single for Love?. In a tweet on her Twitter account, Lopez posted: "I see u @RedOne_Official! We're making BIG things happen 'On the Floor' this new year!!!". Subsequently, on January 16, 2011, an unfinished snippet of "On the Floor" leaked online, labelled as a RedOne production and featuring rap vocals from Pitbull. It is the second time that Lopez and Pitbull have collaborated on a song, the first being "Fresh Out the Oven", the 2009 buzz single which reached number one on the Hot Dance Club Songs chart.

According to the Los Angeles Times's Gerrick D. Kennedy, a full-length unfinished version of "On the Floor" leaked online over the same weekend in time for Lopez's new L'Oreal commercial, which premiered during the telecast of the 68th Golden Globe Awards ceremony in Los Angeles. The timing of the leak also coincided with Lopez's debut on judges panel for season ten of American Idol. Lopez confirmed the single's title as "On the Floor" during the red carpet ceremony at The Golden Globes, before appearing the following day on the radio show On Air with Ryan Seacrest for the song's US premiere. The final version of the song was uploaded to Ryanseacrest.com, where the site's editor, Sadao Turner, revealed that the final master of the song was different from the previously leaked and unfinished version. "On the Floor" made its debut in the United Kingdom, on January 28, 2011 when it was played by DJ Scott Mills on his radio show, Ready for the Weekend. Benji Eisen from AOL Music stated that Lopez had used "genius marketing and branding" by synchronizing the digital release of "On the Floor" with the premiere of its music video on American Idol. It was added to the B-playlist on the UK's biggest mainstream radio station, BBC Radio 1, on March 16, 2011.

When talking about "On the Floor", during an interview with MTV, Lopez said that she wanted a song that would evolve her sound, "it feels like me today, which I like. It's not something that you hear and you're like, 'That's not her,' but you also go, 'Is that her? I like that. It's new,' and that's what I wanted. I wanted it to be very me, but I wanted it to be me not from my first album or my second album, but for today." Additionally, Lopez felt a strong connection to "On the Floor" because it captured both sides of her career, singing, and dancing, "The minute RedOne played it for me, I made him play it 20 times in a row, and I just sat there at the board and I kept listening to it and listening to it ... Because I really feel like, emotionally, I connected to it, but also because of how much I love to dance and how much that's always been such a big part of who I am since I started. Since I was a little girl, I just totally connected with the idea of getting out there."

== Composition ==
"On the Floor" (2011)
A 23-second sample of "On the Floor", which combines a sample of "Llorando se fue" by Los Kjarkas, with dance, house and Latin music. Latino rapper Pitbull provides vocals in two verses.

"On the Floor" is an up-tempo pop and dance-pop song combining elements of Latin, house and techno music. On that topic, Pitbull starts the song with a rap introduction while the melody interpolates elements of the Los Kjarkas composition, "Llorando se fue", popularized by Kaoma's 1989 hit single "Lambada". "On the Floor" was written in the time signature of common time, set at a tempo of 130 beats per minute and in the key of E♭ minor by Bilal "The Chef" Hajji, Kinnda Hamid, Gonzalo Hermosa, Ulises Hermosa, Achraf "AJ Junior" Janussi, Nadir "RedOne" Khayat", Pitbull and Teddy Sky. Lopez's vocal range spans from A♭3 to B♭4 while the melody uses a simple chord progression of E♭ minor–C♭ major–G♭ major–B♭ minor. The song was adapted in Spanish as "Ven a Bailar" which featured additional lyrics by Julio Reyes Copello and Jimena Romero.

"On the Floor" was produced by RedOne with additional vocal production by Kuk Harrell. Josh Gudwin joined Harrell to record the vocals whilst the whole composition was recorded and engineered by RedOne, Christopher "TEK" O'Ryan and Trevor Muzzy at Cove Studios in New York and Henson Recording Studios in Los Angeles. O'Ryan, RedOne and Harrell also edited Lopez's vocals while the latter two also arranged vocals for the final track, with Harrell also providing background vocals. All instruments and programming were carried out by RedOne with the exception of the accordion which was tasked to Alessandro Giulini. Pitbull appears courtesy of Mr. 305, Polo Grounds Music and RCA Records. His vocals were recorded by Al Burna at Al Burna Studios in Davie, Florida and At El Studios Indamix in Dominican Republic. Final mixing was carried out by Muzzy.

According to Gerrick Kennedy from the Los Angeles Times, "On the Floor" is reminiscent of Lopez's single, "Waiting for Tonight" (1999). Kennedy elaborated on the comparisons, stating that "listeners haven't heard this dance-electro-pop side of Lopez since 1999... much of her back catalog flirts with more gritty urban-pop sounds." Editors for the New York Daily News made some comparisons between "On the Floor" and another RedOne production, Kat DeLuna's 2010 single, "Party O'Clock". DeLuna's song contains the lyrics "Party in Ibiza, Party in New York/All the way to Africa/Love in the Caribbean/On my way to Vegas" whereas Lopez sings the nearly identical line, "Brazil, Morocco/London to Ibiza/Straight to L.A. New York/Vegas to Africa."

== Critical reception ==
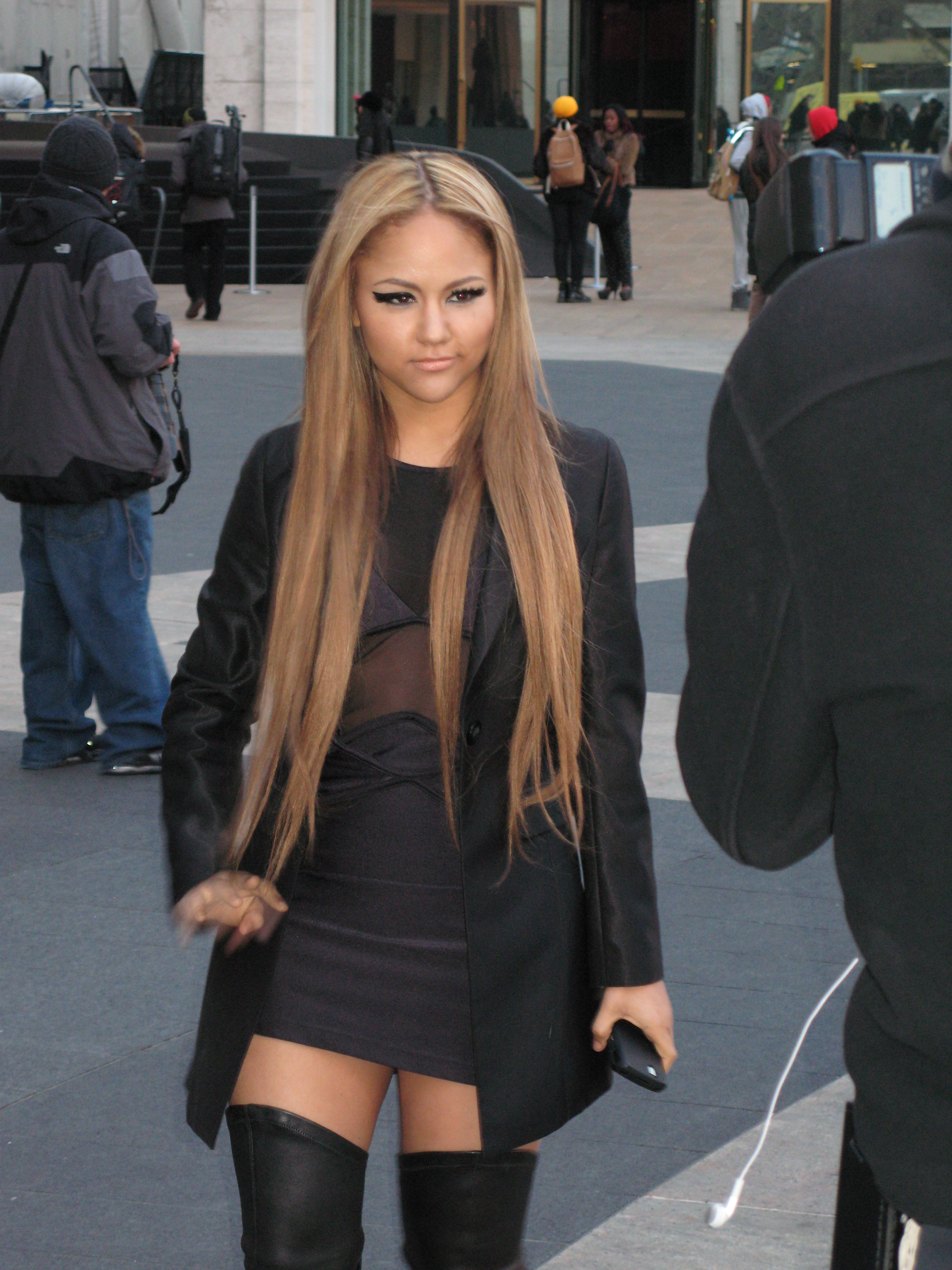
"On the Floor" was compared to "Party O'Clock" by Kat DeLuna.

"On the Floor" garnered universal acclaim from music critics. Rolling Stone called the song "music worth getting lost in". Mikael Wood from the Los Angeles Times agreed, calling "On the Floor" the standout track from Love? Wood said, "On the Floor" "returned Lopez to the upper reaches of the Billboard Hot 100" but added that the rest of the album was unlikely to match its success. The Houston Chronicle's Joey Guerra concurred with his following critics, nothing that "On the Floor" was one of the four standout moments on the album, typyifying the "aggressively sexual anthems that are likely to soundtrack the summer." Comments echoed by The Observer's Hermione Hoby read, "the song ['On the Floor'] was a particular triumph."

In his article for the Los Angeles Times, Gerrick Kennedy said the song is a "sweat-inducing, sticky dance floor track" which was "vintage J.Lo" and catchier than either of her previous releases, "Louboutins" or "Fresh Out the Oven". Although Kennedy praised the song's overall appeal, he commented that RedOne had produced more inventive "pop gems" with the likes of Lady Gaga and that Pitbull's appearance was a "throwaway verse." In her review for AOL Music's Radio Blog, Nadine Cheung commented that Lopez "reinforces her renaissance woman status." Nick Levine from Digital Spy called "On the Floor" a song that The Black Eyed Peas would have been "proud to have released". Levine's review agreed with others that the song was a "welcome comeback for Lopez," and praised the use of a "not so-subtle" sample with the "Latin-tinged electro-housy" production. Overall, he said that the production was "the antithesis of classy", and although not original "there's no denying that this gets the job done."

Not all of the reviews were positive, with some critics citing a lack of originality. In his review of Love?, BBC Music's Alex Macpherson said that "On the Floor" was a predictable recording from Lopez as it was "not too dissimilar to the supreme millennial house of 'Waiting for Tonight' (1999)". He went on to describe "On the Floor," and album track "Papi," as "apparent distillations of the trashy Miami house aesthetic that dominates pop these days." Ken Capobianco from The Boston Globe described "On the Floor" as quite generic.

The single also drew comparisons to "Party O'Clock," a 2010 single by American singer Kat DeLuna, also produced by RedOne. In a statement issued to the New York Daily News, DeLuna said "It's cool that artists like J.Lo are inspired by my musical sound and style. ... Jennifer helped pave the way for Latinas like myself. I love her", and insisted that there wasn't an issue. DeLuna also noted Lopez as someone who inspired her, and paved the way for someone like her to perform. Following previews of the music video for "On the Floor," DeLuna changed her mind about how she felt with the claims of copying. In another interview with the New York Daily News, several days after the first, she said "I've seen this before, where the more established artist tries to take the vision and artistic ideas away from an emerging artist and assumes no one will notice because of their bigger shadow,... Luckily, my loyal fans and the power of the Internet have let the 'Kat' out of the bag." Lopez was interviewed about the issue on Hispanic-American entertainment program ¡Despierta América!. Lopez replied "What? Really? I'm not aware of that...", and when pressed by the presenter a second time, insisted she had not heard rumors of the comparisons.

=== Accolades ===
"On the Floor" received two International Dance Music nominations for Best Latin/Reggaeton Track and Best Commercial/Pop Track. The song was nominated at the 2012 Swiss Music Awards for Best International Hit. The Spanish version "Ven a Bailar" received two nominations at the 2012 Billboard Latin Music Awards for Vocal Duet Song of the Year and Latin Pop Song of the Year. "On the Floor" was recognized by the American Society of Composers, Authors and Publishers (ASCAP) in their Most Performed Songs list for the year. "Ven a Bailar" was also recognized at the 20th ASCAP Latin Music Awards at the Pop Category. It received a Broadcast Music Award at the Pop Awards and the London Awards. At the 2011 Premios Juventud ceremony, the duo received a nomination for La Combinación Perfecta (The Perfect Combination) for the song.

She got nominated for the MTV Europe Music Award for Best Song ("On the Floor"), the MTV Europe Music Award for Best Female ("On the Floor"), MuchMusic Video Award for International Video of the Year – Artist ("On the Floor") with Pitbull.

=== Impact ===
In 2022, "On The Floor" was sampled by British drill rappers A1 x J1 and Tion Wayne for their single "Night Away (Dance)". The song was released on March 3, 2022, and debuted at number eleven on the UK Singles Chart two weeks later.

== Chart performance ==
=== North America ===
"On the Floor" made its chart debut in Canada, during the week beginning February 12, 2011. It debuted at number eighty-six on the Canadian Hot 100, despite not being released until February 22, 2011, thus becoming the first release from Love? to receive airplay recognition. Neither the album's Epic Records buzz single ("Fresh Out the Oven", which also features Pitbull), nor the previous lead single "Louboutins" charted on US Billboard Charts. In the chart week dated April 16, 2011, "On the Floor" became Lopez's fourth Canadian chart-topper, and highest-charting single in nine years following "If You Had My Love" (1999), "Love Don't Cost a Thing" (2001) and "Jenny from the Block" (2002). In the United States, "On the Floor" made its chart debut on the Hot Dance Club Songs, at number twenty-six. Additionally it debuted on the US Pop Songs chart at number forty, marking Lopez's first appearance on pop airplay charts since 2007. The single went on to make its Billboard Hot 100 debut at number nine, becoming the highest debuting Hot 100 single of Lopez's career. "On the Floor" became Lopez's tenth top-ten hit on the Hot 100, of which, six have featured other artists. Billboard's Gary Trust reported that it was Lopez's highest peaking chart position since her 2006 feature on LL Cool J's "Control Myself," although it was actually in 2003 when Lopez last released a top-ten peaking single as a lead artist ("All I Have" with LL Cool J). The full single was not released until February 22, almost one month after it was uploaded to YouTube and serviced to radio, despite a remix EP being available before hand. Keith Caulfield from Billboard noted that Island Def Jam Music's strategy of delaying the release was unusual as fellow pop contemporaries, such as Lady Gaga and Britney Spears, "released their singles to digital retailers at about the same time they were serviced to radio and streaming sites." The single's release was synchronized with the debut of the music video on season ten of American Idol, resulting in first week sales of 170,000 copies and a Hot Digital Songs chart position of number three. The Spanish version of the song also became a success on Latin radio stations where it peaked at number two on the Billboard Hot Latin Songs chart.

As a direct result, Kaoma's 1989 single "Lambada" re-entered the charts after more than two decades, making its digital chart debut at number three on the Billboard World Digital Chart. In the week following the music video's debut, "On the Floor" experienced a 31% increase in sales, which totaled 232,000 copies, and landed the song at number two on the Hot Digital Songs chart, as well as number five on the Hot 100. "On the Floor" thus became Lopez's seventh top-five hit in the United States. It is the first single since "So What" (2008) by Pink to debut in the top-ten of the Hot 100, and then climb up the chart in its second week. Just over a month after release "On the Floor" had sold over 600,000 copies in the United States, according to USA Today's Bill Keveney. Keveney, attributed Lopez's commercial comeback to product endorsement deals with L'Oreal and Gillette, also noting her appointment as a judge on American Idol a contributing factor in the growth of her popularity. During the week ending May 8, 2011, "On the Floor" rose from number seven to a new peak of number three on the Hot 100. By March 28, 2011, "On the Floor" reached number one on the Hot Dance Club Songs chart, becoming her fifth consecutive US dance chart topper, with three coming from her album Love?, including "Fresh Out the Oven" (with Pitbull) and "Louboutins" (2009). "On the Floor" brings Lopez's US dance number ones total to nine singles since she launched her career in 1999. Since then, it has been certified 8× Multi-Platinum by the Recording Industry Association of America (RIAA), denoting shipments of eight million copies. As a result of Lopez's first televised performance of the song on May 5, 2011, "On the Floor" logged 175,000 digital sales that week (up 25% on the previous week), earning Lopez the "Digital Gainer" title that week. Consequently, "On the Floor" reached a new peak of number three on the Hot 100 and number five on the US Pop Songs chart, becoming her highest-charting single commercial single as a lead artist, as well as her most successful airplay hit on contemporary hit radio, since 2002's "Jenny from the Block". By April 2012, the song has sold 3.49 million downloads in the US alone. A year later in April 2013, it was reported that "On the Floor" had sold 3.8 million downloads in the United States.

=== Europe and Oceania ===
Globally, "On the Floor" topped 37 national single charts and has sold 11 million copies as of June 2017. On the Slovakia Airplay chart, the single debuted at number sixteen, before peaking at number one where it remained for two weeks beginning on March 7, 2011. It returned to the top of the chart in the first week of April 2011, after dipping to number two at the end of March, and made a third return to number one in the third week of April. In total, "On the Floor" spent a total of seven weeks at number one. It also topped both the Flemish and Wallonian single charts in Belgium. On the Flanders Ultratop 50, "On the Floor" peaked at number one, remaining there for four weeks. Meanwhile, on the Wallonia Ultratop 50, the single remained at number one for four weeks, before dropping to number four and then returning to number one for a fifth week. In both territories, it is Lopez's first number one single in Belgium. The Belgian Entertainment Association (BEA) certified the single gold, for selling 15,000 copies. In Finland, "On the Floor" debuted at number one, giving Lopez her third number one in the country, behind "Love Don't Cost a Thing" (2001) and her debut single "If You Had My Love" (1999). Selling platinum with over 12,000 copies, "On the Floor" was the second-best-selling single of 2011 in Finland and in total it spent nine weeks at number one, making it Lopez's longest-serving number-one, as well as her longest-charting single in the country. In France, the song debuted at number four of the singles chart on February 27, 2011, becoming the second highest debut of Lopez in the country since "Get Right" (2005). Three weeks later, on March 20, 2011, the song peaked atop, becoming Lopez's first and only number one and Pitbull's second number one after "I Know You Want Me", reaching the top spot in 2009. It was also Lopez's and Pitbull's longuest-charting single at the French Singles Chart (thirty seven in total) from February 2011 to July 2012 with many re-entries until "Ain't Your Mama" in 2016, which spent fifty-two weeks and "Give Me Everything", dropped the same year than "On The Floor" and who stayed sixty three weeks in total. In 2026, following its worldwide resurgence, "On The Floor" re-entered at number 197 and jumped from 125 spots and reached the 72th spot, becoming Lopez's and Pitbull's biggest-jumping chart ever.

"On the Floor" also reached number one in Spain (fifteen weeks) and Germany (six weeks). In Spain, "On the Floor" reached number one on March 13, 2011, where it remained for fifteen weeks. Consequently, the single was certified Triple Platinum, by the Productores de Música de España (PROMUSICAE), for shipments of 120,000 copies. It was also certified 2× Platinum by the Bundesverband Musikindustrie (BVMI), in Germany, for shipping 600,000 copies. In Italy, "On the Floor" entered the Italian Singles Chart at number four before ascending to the summit, where it would remain for four weeks. It is Lopez's fourth Italian number-one, and first English-language single to reach number one since "Get Right" (2005), though Spanish single "Qué Hiciste" reached number one in 2007. The Federation of the Italian Music Industry (FIMI) certified "On the Floor" Multi-Platinum for shipping 60,000 copies. The single experienced similar success in Sweden and Switzerland, where it respectively spent three and five weeks at the top of the countries' singles charts. In Sweden it is Lopez's first number one single, whereas in Switzerland it is her second, following 2007's "Qué Hiciste". In both countries the single was certified Double Platinum, shipping 40,000 copies in Sweden and 60,000 copies in Switzerland. As of July 26, 2011 "On the Floor" had official sales of 1.41 million copies.

In Australia, "On the Floor" debuted at number ten, becoming Lopez's first top-ten single in the country since 2005's "Get Right". It has since reached number one, becoming her second Australian chart topper, and first in nearly twelve years since 1999's "If You Had My Love". It was certified 4× platinum by the Australian Recording Industry Association (ARIA) for shipments of 280,000 copies. It reached number two in New Zealand, and was certified double-Platinum for sales of 30,000 copies. In Ireland, "On the Floor" debuted at number twelve on the Irish Singles Chart on March 10, 2011. It continued a steady climb to the top spot, spending two weeks at number two before finally reaching number one on April 14, 2011. In the United Kingdom, "On the Floor" was added to playlists on mainstream radio in March 2011. On April 3, 2011, "On the Floor" made its UK Singles Chart debut at number one, becoming Lopez's third chart-topper in that country. Overall it is Lopez's twelfth UK top-five hit, and topped the UK Digital Songs chart after logging first week sales of 130,000 copies – the highest first week sales for Lopez in the UK. "On the Floor" also debuted at the top of the R&B Singles Chart. It remained at number one for two weeks, becoming the only single by Lopez to do so. The song was the biggest selling R&B / hip hop single of 2011 in the UK. As of May 2012, "On the Floor" had sold 822,056 copies, becoming Lopez' biggest-selling single in the UK.

=== Globally ===
By the end of 2011, International Federation of the Phonographic Industry (IFPI) noted that "On the Floor" had sold over 8.4 million copies worldwide, making it the best selling single by a female artist.

== Music video ==
=== Background and development ===
The music video for "On the Floor" was filmed on January 22–23, 2011, with TAJ Stansberry serving as the director and Frank Gatson as the choreographer. Lopez told MTV News that for the video she was holding an open casting call to find club kids, "[We want] those kids who go to the club and they dance all night and that's all they care about? It's just about having a good time, getting all sweaty, and it's all about the music and leaving it on the dance floor. I don't want to say what the video is, but that's the type of dancers. We're doing a big casting call..." Meanwhile, Gatson said that Lopez wanted a post-2AM Los Angeles club vibe for the video. He said,

"[We're trying to create a vibe] that's so amazing. [It's like] everybody had some watermelon and the watermelon made them high, it gave them a little buzz — but a good buzz, a real magical buzz, a dance buzz, a buzz that makes you feel like fried chicken, so she just wants everybody to have a good old time... The club must have this vibe, where you get on the floor and everybody's bringing it", he added. "We've seen so many club videos, but we want to see a club video with a vibe unique to Jennifer Lopez."

Just prior of the casting call and video shoot, Stansberry expressed his views to MTV News on the concept for the video – originality. "Originality, being you. This song is about being who you want. It's about letting loose. There's no explanation. This is this underground video, this underground party." During the video shoot, MTV interviewed Lopez about the concepts for the video. Lopez described some of the characters she played, telling MTV that in one scene "I play one character where she kind of runs this party, acts like she's kind of over it, but at the same time loves it and loves this kind of underground kind of party dance culture,... So I got to be wild and crazy, and at the same time I got to be sexy and sweet too." The video makes use of product placement, including BMW, Swarovski and Crown Royal, according to Tanner Stransky from Entertainment Weekly. Stransky also noted the "unintentional placement" of fake eyelashes and wigs, weaves, and other hair-extending products.

Lopez later confirmed in an interview On Air with Ryan Seacrest, that the completed music video would premiere jointly on season ten of American Idol and on Vevo on March 3, 2011. Fans could vote between three alternative endings through Idol's official website. Lopez said the idea behind giving fans the choice was to give them a chance to see what she experienced. "You get to do what I do,... Like, I go in there with my videos and I start editing and picking all the shots I like and the things that I like and what I feel the best kind of feeling for the record is. You guys get to do that. We picked two different ones and we weren't sure." The alternative endings included three varying scenes: in the first, the video ends with a close-up of Lopez's face in the silver lace catsuit; the second ends with a shot of dancers defying gravity on the walls and ceiling, while the final ending ends with a shot of Lopez on the dance floor in her harem pants. The first ending was the one used in the final video.

=== Synopsis ===
A scene from the clip where Lopez is styled with a beehive bun and gold gladiator heels. She wears a dress with Gaga-esque detailing in its high collar and leaves.

The clip begins with Lopez's arrival at a club in a black BMW, one example of the product placement used throughout the video. As the music begins, she puts on a pair Swarovski crystal earrings before the camera switches to inside the club. where it descends from the ceiling amongst the Las Vegas-style crystal chandeliers. Choreographer Frank Gatson Jr. called the club, "the best dance party in town," where Lopez played several different characters. Both the scenery and artist were styled to pay homage to her background as a professional dancer, she said she wanted the video to "introduce people to a new J.Lo-ration of party people". In one scene, she plays a dominant queen of the party who watches from above, on a balcony surrounded by servants. When portraying this character, Lopez was styled with "a big beehive bun, gold gladiator heels and a glittery gold gown with Gaga-esque detailing in its high collar and leaves." The 'queen' character "dangles lazily on a couch" and "regally oversees a crowd of people getting down on the dancefloor." In another scene, Lopez wears a silver crystal and lace skin-tight catsuit, designed by Lebanese fashion designer Zuhair Murad, as she dances against a "gold cardio barre" before proceeding to shake her "money maker," according to the Los Angeles Times. Spliced in between these scenes, she is seen dressed in black harem pants and a bikini top, as she walks through the crowd to mount a circular stage on the Las Vegas-style dancefloor. MTV's Kelly Carter and AOL's Khawlhring Sawmteii described the final scenes as Lopez "tearing up the floor," and "breaking it down 'fly-girl' style."

=== Reception ===
The music video was welcomed with critical acclaim from music critics, praising the expensive finish, arrangement, Lopez's sense of fashion and the overall execution. Based on a preview of the video, Entertainment Weekly's Tanner Stransky said the clip brought together a flawless realness with an expensive set-up, things that are "very important elements in the pop music world and to the old Lopez that everyone knew and loved." Following its full premiere, Stransky added that the video was "sexy and sultry." Kyle Anderson from MTV's Newsroom agreed, noting the "gorgeous and exquisite execution," particularly praising Lopez's "incredible hairstyles" and the "gorgeous club interiors [set design]." Anderson ended his review by stating that the premiere of the song's music video almost overshadowed the episode of American Idol in which it was shown.

AOL's Benji Eisen called "On the Floor" a "comeback of sorts" for Lopez, particularly noting its clever cross-promotion with Idol and Lopez's multiple product endorsement deals. He applauded Lopez for moving on from her previous lack of commercial success in recent years. The sex appeal in the video for "On the Floor" was likened to that last displayed by Lopez in the video for 2002's "I'm Gonna Be Alright". A reviewer from the Daily Express said "Jennifer Lopez once told us in a song that 'I'm Gonna Be Alright' and now she's proved it... The curves she displayed when she recorded the hit video nine years ago have been replaced by a leaner, fitter look [in 'On the Floor']." Matthew Perpetua from Rolling Stone agreed with comparisons to Lopez's earlier work: "Basically, this is classic Lopez tweaked for 2011... visuals that update late-Nineties bling with a high fashion wardrobe nearly as eccentric as that of Rihanna and Lady Gaga." As a result of the video's premiere, the online traffic at Lopez's official Vevo account increased by 1000%, and as of September, 2025, has received over 2.6 billion views on YouTube. In the space of two weeks, the video was viewed over thirty million times on Lopez's official Vevo page, according to USA Today.

== Live performances ==
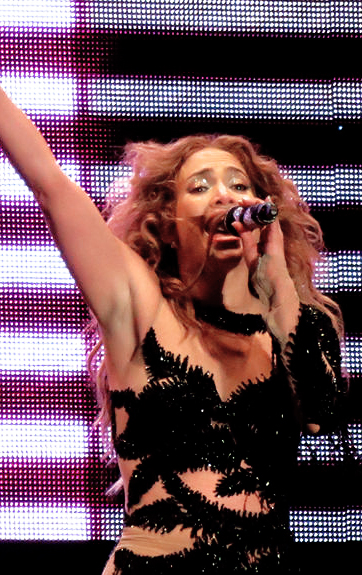
Lopez performed "On the Floor" during the Dance Again World Tour

On May 5, 2011, Lopez and Pitbull took the stage of American Idol to perform "On the Floor" for the first time. The performance consisted of her breaking two dancers out of glass boxes, an elaborate dance routine and two appearances from Pitbull. Initially he appeared from the crowd, but for his second appearance, he arrived at the back of the stage via a moving staircase. Lopez was dressed in a "glimmering ensemble" while the set included lasers and pyrotechnics. According to Adam Graham from MTV, the performance was taped prior to the episode of Idol, made apparent by what Graham called "sloppy editing." According to The Hollywood Reporter, Lopez pretaped the performance due to a perceived danger of flying shards of glass from the earlier part of the routine. The performance was praised by Caryn Ganz from Yahoo! Music, who complimented all of the element of the performance. Ganz said "[everything from the] lush production values to her own high energy dancing and live vocals ... This performance maxed out what an artist can do in such a medium – awesome lighting, high-impact video footage, a strong feature from Pitbull, excellent staging, solid choreography, a bit of pyro, and a ton of warmth and personality." An editor from Rap-Up magazine agreed, saying that "Lopez showed the contestants how its done, commanding the stage during her smashing performance."

The duo reprised their performance at KIIS-FM's Wango Tango music festival in Los Angeles, on May 14, 2011. Lopez wore a shiny gold catsuit for the performance, which did not go as planned when halfway through the performance her microphone failed. She continued performing for 20 seconds, before realising that she had lost sound. According to lifestyle website Female First, Lopez proceeded to dance, and urged the audience to sing along. At the end of the performance, Lopez addressed the crowd straight after the performance, saying "We ain't gonna let that get us down, right? Nobody keeps mama down." After Pitbull informed her of the malfunction, she turned to the band asking them to start from the beginning so that she could perform the song again.

On June 11, 2011, Lopez flew to the United Kingdom to promote "On the Floor," first appearing at Capital FM's Summertime Ball. Later that day, she appeared at the finale of the second series of So You Think You Can Dance to reprise the performance. Wearing a skin-tight catsuit, Lopez descended from the ceiling in an illuminated heart before proceeding to perform the song, which included her dropping to her knees during the chorus. Lopez reprise the performance on X Factor (France) on June 14, 2011, and German game-show Wetten, dass..? on June 18.

Lopez later performed the song as part of her medley during the 2018 MTV Video Music Awards on August 20, 2018, at Radio City Music Hall in New York City.

The song was featured in Lopez's setlist during the Super Bowl LIV halftime show.

== Formats and track listings ==
- CD single
1. "On the Floor" – 3:51
2. "On the Floor" (Low Sunday Club Remix) – 6:22
- Digital download
1. "On the Floor" – 3:51
- Digital download (Spanish Version)
1. "Ven a Bailar (On the Floor)" – 4:52
- Digital download (EP)
1. "On the Floor" (Radio Edit) – 3:51
2. "On the Floor" (CCW Club Mix) – 6:26
3. "On the Floor" (Ralphi's Jurty Club Vox) – 8:43
4. "On the Floor" (music video) – 4:27
- Digital download (Remixes)
1. "On the Floor" (CCW Radio Mix) – 3:44
2. "On the Floor" (Low Sunday "On the Floor" Radio Edit) – 3:51
3. "On the Floor" (Ralphi's Jurty Radio Edit) – 3:57
4. "On the Floor" (Mixin Marc & Tony Svejda LA to Ibiza Radio Edit) – 3:16
5. "On the Floor" (CCW Club Mix) – 6:26
6. "On the Floor" (Low Sunday "On the Floor" Club) – 6:22
7. "On the Floor" (Ralphi's Jurty Club Vox) – 8:43
8. "On the Floor" (Mixin Marc & Tony Svejda LA to Ibiza Mix) – 6:40
9. "On the Floor" (CCW Dub Mix) – 6:07
10. "On the Floor" (Low Sunday "On the Floor" Dub) – 6:37
11. "On the Floor" (Ralphi's Jurty Dub) – 8:43
12. "On the Floor" (Mixin Marc & Tony Svejda LA to Ibiza Dub) – 5:36

== Credits and personnel ==
Credits taken from CD single, "On the Floor" contains interpolations of the Los Kjarkas composition: "Llorando Se Fue", written by Gonzalo Hermosa and Ulises Hermosa.

Recording

- Cove Studio Archived October 24, 2018, at the Wayback Machine (New York)
- Henson Recording (Los Angeles)
- Al Burna Studios (Davie, Florida)
- Et Al Indamix (Dominican Republic)

Personnel

- Alessandro Giulini – accordion
- Josh Gudwin – vocal recording
- Bilal Hajji – songwriter
- Kinda Hamid – songwriter
- Kuk Harrell – vocal arranger, vocal editor, vocal producer, vocal recording
- Gonzalo Hermosa – songwriter
- Ulises Hermosa – songwriter
- Achraf "AJ Junior" Janussi – songwriter
- Trevor Muzzy – audio mixer, recording engineer
- Nadir "RedOne" Khayat – producer, songwriter, vocal arranger, vocal editor, vocal producer, instruments and programming, recording engineer
- Jennifer Lopez – lead vocalist, backing vocalist
- Chris "TEK" O'Ryan – vocal editor, recording engineer
- Armando "Pitbull" Perez – rap vocalist, songwriter
- Geraldo "Teddy Sky" Sandell – songwriter
- Low Sunday (Bart Schoudel & Ron Haney) – additional production for remix

== Charts ==
=== Weekly charts ===
2011 weekly chart performance for "On the Floor"
Chart (2011)	Peak position
Australia (ARIA)	1
Austria (Ö3 Austria Top 40)	1
Belgium (Ultratop 50 Flanders)	1
Belgium (Ultratop 50 Wallonia)	1
Brazil (Billboard Hot 100)	1
Brazil (Billboard Hot Pop Songs)	1
Canada Hot 100 (Billboard)	1
Canada CHR/Top 40 (Billboard)	2
Canada Hot AC (Billboard)	2
CIS Airplay (TopHit)	2
Croatia International Airplay (Top lista)	2
Czech Republic Airplay (ČNS IFPI)	1
Denmark (Tracklisten)	3
Euro Digital Song Sales (Billboard)	1
Finland (Suomen virallinen lista)	1
France (SNEP)	1
Germany (GfK)	1
Global Dance Tracks (Billboard)	4
Greece Airplay (IFPI Greece)	1
Greece Digital (Billboard)	1
Hungary (Dance Top 40)	4
Hungary (Rádiós Top 40)	10
Hungary (Single Top 40)	8
Ireland (IRMA)	1
Israel International Airplay (Media Forest)	1
Italy (FIMI)	1
Japan Hot 100 (Billboard)	10
Japan Adult Contemporary Airplay (Billboard)	3
Lebanon (Lebanese Top 20)	19
Luxembourg Digital Songs (Billboard)	1
Mexico Airplay (Billboard)	2
Mexico Español Airplay (Billboard)	1
Mexico Anglo Airplay (Monitor Latino)	1
Netherlands (Dutch Top 40)	4
Netherlands (Single Top 100)	4
New Zealand (Recorded Music NZ)	2
Norway (VG-lista)	1
Poland Airplay (ZPAV)	2
Poland (Polish TV Airplay)	4
Poland (Dance Top 50)	1
Portugal Digital Songs (Billboard)	1
Romania Airplay (Romanian Top 100)	1
Romania TV Airplay (Media Forest)	1
Russia Airplay (TopHit)	1
Scottish Singles Sales (Official Charts)	1
Slovakia Airplay (ČNS IFPI)	1
South Korea International (Gaon)	5
Spain (Promusicae)	1
Sweden (Sverigetopplistan)	1
Switzerland (Schweizer Hitparade)	1
Ukraine Airplay (TopHit)	6
UK Singles (Official Charts)	1
UK Hip Hop/R&B (Official Charts)	1
US Billboard Hot 100	3
US Adult Pop Airplay (Billboard)	24
US Dance Club Songs (Billboard)	1
US Dance Airplay (Billboard)	1
US Dance Singles Sales (Billboard)	5
US Pop Airplay (Billboard)	5
US Rhythmic Airplay (Billboard)	10

2011 weekly chart performance for "Ven a Bailar"
Chart (2011)	Peak position
US Hot Latin Songs (Billboard)	2
US Latin Pop Airplay (Billboard)	1
US Tropical Airplay (Billboard)	5

2020–2024 weekly chart performance for "On the Floor"
Chart (2020–2024)	Peak position
Finland Airplay (Radiosoittolista)	58
Israel International Airplay (Media Forest)	19
US Hot Dance/Electronic Songs (Billboard)	4

2026 weekly chart performance for "On the Floor"
Chart (2026)	Peak position
Austria (Ö3 Austria Top 40)	11
Brazil Hot 100 (Billboard)	80
Croatia (Billboard)	20
Czech Republic Singles Digital (ČNS IFPI)	16
France (SNEP)	64
Germany (GfK)	18
Global 200 (Billboard)	22
Greece International (IFPI)	5
Hungary (Single Top 40)	37
Ireland (IRMA)	27
Italy (FIMI)	35
Latvia Streaming (LaIPA)	8
Lithuania (AGATA)	10
Netherlands (Single Top 100)	63
Panama Streaming (PRODUCE)	115
Poland (Polish Streaming Top 100)	24
Portugal (AFP)	37
Romania (Billboard)	21
Slovakia Singles Digital (ČNS IFPI)	9
Switzerland (Schweizer Hitparade)	21
UK Singles (Official Charts)	35
UK Hip Hop/R&B (Official Charts)	11

=== Monthly charts ===
Monthly chart performance
Chart (2026)	Peak position
Panama Streaming (PRODUCE)	132

=== Year-end charts ===
2011 year-end chart performance for "On the Floor"
Chart (2011)	Position
Australia (ARIA)	10
Austria (Ö3 Austria Top 75)	1
Belgium (Ultratop 50 Flanders)	8
Belgium (Ultratop 50 Wallonia)	9
Brazil (Crowley)	26
Canada (Canadian Hot 100)	3
CIS (Tophit)	3
Croatia International Airplay (HRT)	2
Denmark (Tracklisten)	12
Finland (Suomen virallinen lista)	1
France (SNEP)	6
France Airplay (SNEP)	13
Germany (Media Control AG)	1
Greece (IFPI Greece)	5
Hungary (Dance Top 40)	20
Hungary (Rádiós Top 40)	78
Iceland (Tónlist)	19
Ireland (IRMA)	6
Israel (Media Forest)	3
Italy (FIMI)	4
Japan (Japan Hot 100)	45
Netherlands (Dutch Top 40)	31
Netherlands (Single Top 100)	16
New Zealand (Recorded Music NZ)	9
Poland (Polish Airplay Top 100)	31
Poland (Polish Dance Top 50)	4
Romania (Romanian Top 100)	9
Russia Airplay (Tophit)	5
South Korea International (Gaon)	97
Spain (PROMUSICAE)	1
Spain Airplay (PROMUSICAE)	1
Spain TV Airplay (PROMUSICAE)	2
Sweden (Digilistan)	2
Sweden (Sverigetopplistan)	6
Switzerland (Schweizer Hitparade)	1
Ukraine Airplay (Tophit)	9
UK Singles (Official Charts Company)	10
US Billboard Hot 100	11
US Dance Club Songs (Billboard)	15
US Dance/Mix Show Airplay (Billboard)	12
US Hot Latin Songs (Billboard)	10
US Mainstream Top 40 (Billboard)	31
US Radio Songs (Billboard	22
US Rhythmic (Billboard)	43
US Tropical Songs (Billboard)	15

2020 year-end performance for "On the Floor"
Chart (2020)	Position
US Hot Dance/Electronic Songs (Billboard)	88

== Certifications and sales ==
Certifications and sales for "On the Floor"
Region	Certification	Certified units/sales
Australia (ARIA)	4× Platinum	280,000^{^}
Belgium (BRMA)	Platinum	30,000^{*}
Brazil (Pro-Música Brasil)	3× Diamond	750,000^{‡}
Canada (Music Canada)	5× Platinum	400,000^{*}
Denmark (IFPI Danmark)	2× Platinum	180,000^{‡}
Finland (Musiikkituottajat)	Platinum	12,213
Germany (BVMI)	7× Gold	1,050,000^{‡}
Italy (FIMI)	3× Platinum	90,000^{*}
Japan (RIAJ) Digital single	Platinum	250,000^{*}
New Zealand (RMNZ)	4× Platinum	120,000^{‡}
Russia (NFPF) Ringtone	Platinum	200,000^{*}
South Korea (Gaon Chart)	—	206,578
Spain (Promusicae)	3× Platinum	120,000^{*}
Spain (Promusicae) 2015 onwards	Platinum	60,000^{‡}
Sweden (GLF)	2× Platinum	80,000^{‡}
Switzerland (IFPI Switzerland)	4× Platinum	120,000^{^}
United Kingdom (BPI)	3× Platinum	1,800,000
United States (RIAA)	8× Platinum	8,000,000^{‡}
Streaming
Greece (IFPI Greece)	3× Platinum	6,000,000^{†}
Summaries
Worldwide	—	13,000,000 (in 2011)
^{*} Sales figures based on certification alone.^{^} Shipments figures based on certification alone.^{‡} Sales+streaming figures based on certification alone.^{†} Streaming-only figures based on certification alone.

== Release history ==
Release dates and formats for "On the Floor"
Country	Date	Format	Label
United States	February 8, 2011	Mainstream, Rhythmic airplay	Island Records
United States	February 11, 2011	Remix EP (Masterbeat.com only)	Island Records
Australia	February 18, 2011	Digital download	Universal Music
Ireland	February 18, 2011	Digital download	Universal Music
Norway	February 21, 2011	Digital download	Universal Music
Spain	February 21, 2011	Digital download, Remixes EP	Universal Music
Switzerland	February 21, 2011	Digital download	Universal Music
Austria	February 22, 2011	Digital download	Universal Music
Belgium	February 22, 2011	Digital download, Remixes EP	Universal Music
Canada	February 22, 2011	Digital download	Universal Music
Finland	February 22, 2011	Digital download	Universal Music
France	February 22, 2011	Digital download	Universal Music
Germany	February 22, 2011	Digital download	Universal Music
Italy	February 22, 2011	Digital download	Universal Music
Sweden	February 22, 2011	Digital download, Remixes EP	Universal Music
United States	February 22, 2011	Digital download	Island Records
Switzerland	February 24, 2011	Remixes EP	Universal Music
Ireland	February 25, 2011	Digital single	Universal Music
Netherlands	February 25, 2011	Digital download, Remixes EP	Universal Music
Germany	March 11, 2011	CD single	Universal Music
United Kingdom	March 27, 2011	Digital download, digital single	Mercury Records

== See also ==
- Billboard Top Latin Songs Year-End Chart
- List of best-selling Latin singles
- List of Billboard Hot 100 top 10 singles in 2011
- List of Hot 100 number-one singles of 2011 (Canada)
- List of number-one dance airplay hits of 2011 (U.S.)
- List of number-one dance singles of 2011 (U.S.)
- List of number-one hits of 2011 (France)
- List of number-one hits of 2011 (Italy)
- List of number-one pop hits of 2011 (Brazil)
- List of number-one R&B hits of 2011 (UK)
- List of number-one singles from the 2010s (UK)
- List of number-one singles of 2011 (Australia)
- List of number-one singles of 2011 (Finland)
- List of number-one singles of 2011 (Spain)
- List of number-one singles of 2011 (Sweden)
- List of Polish Dance Chart number-one singles of 2011
- List of Romanian Top 100 number ones of the 2010s
- List of Ultratop 50 number-one singles of 2011
