= Avalanche (band) =

Norwegian musical duo

- Origin: Norway
- Genres: Disco, dance
- Years active: 1984-2008
- Labels: Metronome, Teldec
- Members: Kjetil Røsnes; Kirsti Johansen

Avalanche were a Norwegian disco and dance duo group founded in 1984. The group is composed of Kjetil Røsnes (born 30 March 1960) and Kirsti Johansen (born 22 September 1963). From the late 1980s and during the 1990s the couple lived and worked in Germany and France. They currently live in Aurskog-Høland, Norway with their two children.

Kjetil Røsnes is owner of Planet Orange Production, a music production company based in Aurskog.

In 1989 the duo had their biggest hit with the song "Johnny, Johnny Come Home," written one year earlier, in France, where it was the number-one single for eight weeks (sold ~700,000). It was also successful in their home country of Norway.

Kjetil Røsnes and Kirsti Johansen wrote "Santa Maria" a successful song both for Dutch singer Tatjana and singer Samantha Fox.

They later launched a side-project called K + K.

In 2007 the Blue Moon Band participated in Melodi Grand Prix (MGP) with "Goodbye to yesterday", written by Kjetil + Kirsti.

A year later Avalanche were in MGP with the song "Two Monkeys (On The Roof)". The song was written in 1997 when the couple lived near Cannes, France. However, they could not be at the MGP 2008 together because Kirsti was ill. She was replaced by Camilla Alvestad (formerly a member of band Reset).

Neither composition reached the MGP-finals in these two years.

== Singles ==
- "Heaven Tonight" (1984)
- "Wheel Of Fortune" (1986)
- "Bird of Paradise" (1987) - with No Time To Lose on the B-side
- "Johnny, Johnny Come Home" (1988) - #1 in France, Gold disc; #3 in Norway
- "All blame on love" (1989) as Bluebeat
- "I Will Wait" (1989) - #43 in France
- "Blue Train" (1990)
- "Riding on a Storm" (1990)
- "Love Me, Please Love Me" (1991) (cover of Michel Polnareff's song)
- "Young Guns" (1991)
- "When the Cowboys Come" (1992)
- "Cosmic Philosophy" (1999) as K + K

== Albums ==
- Avalanche (1989)
- Westbound (1992)
- K + K (2002) promo only, as K + K
