= Loalwa Braz =

Brazilian pop singer (1953–2017)

Background information
- Born: Loalwa Braz Vieira; 3 June 1953; Jacarepaguá, Rio de Janeiro, Brazil
- Origin: Rio de Janeiro, Brazil
- Died: 19 January 2017 (aged 63) Saquarema, Rio de Janeiro, Brazil
- Occupation: Singer
- Years active: 1966–2017

Loalwa Braz Vieira (3 June 1953 – 19 January 2017) was a Brazilian singer, best known for providing the lead vocals for the French-Brazilian recording act Kaoma from 1989 to 1999.

Her biggest success was Lambada in 1989, a direct cover of the 1986 song "Chorando Se Foi" by Márcia Ferreira, which itself was a Portuguese version of the 1984 song "Llorando se fue" by Peruvian group Cuarteto Continental, which itself was an adaptation of the 1981 song by Los Kjarkas of the same name, which was composed by Ulises Hermosa and Gonzalo Hermosa.

Braz was fluent in four languages, and recorded songs in her native Portuguese, as well as in Spanish, French and English.

== Biography ==
Braz was born in Jacarepaguá, Rio de Janeiro, to a family of musicians: her father was an orchestra leader and her mother was a popular and classical pianist. Braz learned to play the piano at the age of four, and started singing at the age of 13. She lived in Paris from 1985, and in Geneva from 2010 until her death in 2017.

Braz grew up surrounded by the rhythms of Brazil, which shone through her songs. Her natural gifts were strengthened by hard work. Braz quickly obtained many awards, and started performing at Rio's most prestigious night clubs. Her talent gained her the recognition of Brazil's greatest pop artists Gilberto Gil, Tim Maia, Alcione, Maria Bethânia, Emílio Santiago, Gal Costa, and Caetano Veloso, who became her stage and recording co-workers from 1975 to 1985. She moved to Paris in 1985, after her success at the Palais des Sports, with the show "Brésil en Fête".

Braz appeared at major show business venues: Paradis Latin, Méridien (Paris), Olympia ('88 and '92), TLP Dejazet, New Morning, Zenith, Madison Square Garden (New York City), and the London Palladium and Waldorf Astoria (both London).

In 1989, Braz became the lead vocalist of Kaoma, and this led to the release of the album Worldbeat. The album included 10 songs, including "Lambamor", "Mélodie D'Amour", "Dançando Lambada", and "Lambada", the latter of which became a worldwide hit. The song Lambada had been registered at SACEM as it if was composed by Chico de Oliveira, which turned out to be a pseudonym for Olivier Lorsac, who illegally registered the song as his own. In reality, the song Lambada was an unauthorized cover of "Chorando Se Foi", a 1986 song by Brazilian singer Márcia Ferreira, which was a Portuguese version of the 1984 song "Llorando se fue", by Peruvian group Cuarteto Continental, which itself was an adaptation and rearrangement of the 1981 Andean folk song of the same name by Bolivian folk group Los Kjarkas, whose original version was a saya and a caporal.

This eventually led to successful lawsuits against the band, leading to financial compensations by Kaoma to the real authors: Gonzalo Hermosa and Ulises Hermosa (the composers of the melody), Alberto Maraví (the responsible for the arrangement), Márcia Ferreira and José Ari (the writers of the lyrics, despite Kaoma making significant changes to the lyrics).

The success of "Lambada" also brought new attention to Latin music in non-Latin regions.

Kaoma released two more albums: "Tribal Pursuit" in 1991 (which included the song "Dança Tago-Mago"), and "A la media noche" in 1998. The band disbanded in 1999, and Braz went on a solo career.

=== Later years ===
Braz composed and sang two songs for the soundtrack of the movie Le Roi Desperados – produced by French television station Canal+ - and performed with the London Philharmonic Orchestra, in Abbey Road, for the soundtrack of the French movie Dis-Moi Oui, directed by Alexandre Arcady and with music by Phillipe Sarde. Braz's adaptation of the Stevie Wonder song "Another Star" into Portuguese (as "Outro Lugar") demonstrated her skills, and that was why great names of world music were interested in her compositions and arrangements. Braz was a member of the Arts, Sciences and Literature French Academy; she was decorated with the silver medal (Prix Thorlet) in 2003. She released a solo album in 2006, itself a trip between romanticism and the explosion of rhythms which characterized the artist's musical style. A new title enriched the singer's career: Ambassadress of the Association Francophone pour la Promotion de l'Esprit Sportif (AFPES).

=== Death ===
In the early hours of 19 January 2017, police found Braz's body in a burnt-out car next to a road in Saquarema, 73 km from Rio de Janeiro. She was 63 years old. According to witnesses, two men had been seen earlier in her home, not far from the place where the vehicle was found. Police detained three men as suspects in her death, describing the crime as 'a robbery gone awry'. According to police, men broke into Loalwa's inn, put her in the vehicle, and took her to Estrada da Barreira, in the Bacaxá District.

Also according to the Brazilian police investigation, she was murdered by one of her employees, who had started working at the singer's inn just 15 days prior to her death. The three men were sentenced to 37, 28 and 22 years in prison for the murder respectively.

== Discography ==
Solo

- Brésil (1989)
- Recomeçar (2003)
- Ensolarado (2011)

with Kaoma

- Worldbeat (1989)
- Tribal-Pursuit (1991)
- A La Media Noche (1998)
