= Mélodie d'amour (Kaoma song) =

1990 single by Kaoma

Single by Kaoma

from the album Worldbeat
- B-side: "Lambamor"
- Released: March 1990
- Recorded: 1989
- Genre: Latin
- Length: 4:11
- Label: CBS, Epic
- Songwriters: Loalwa Braz, Jean-Claude Bonaventure
- Producer: Jean-Claude Bonaventure

Kaoma singles chronology
"Dançando Lambada" (1989)	"Mélodie d'amour" (1990)	"Danca tago-mago" (1991)

"Mélodie d'amour" is a 1989 song recorded by French-Brazilian band Kaoma. Written by Loalwa Braz and Jean-Claude Bonaventure, it was released in March 1990 as the third single from their 1989 album Worldbeat, on which it appears as the sixth track. It was a hit in France, earning a Silver disc.

== Chart performance ==
In France, "Mélodie d'amour" debuted at number 47 on the chart edition of 24 March 1990 and remained for two months in the lower quarter of the top 50 chart. It entered the top twenty in its eleventh week, in which it remained for nine weeks, with a peak at number 11 in its 15th week. It eventually had a 25-week chart run, which was long enough to obtain a Silver disc, awarded by the Syndicat National de l'Édition Phonographique. "Mélodie d'amour" also charted for 14 weeks on the Dutch Single Top 100, starting at number 99 on 17 March 1990 with two weeks at number 15, its highest position, then dropped quickly.

On the Eurochart Hot 100 Singles, it debuted at number 99 on 28 April 1990, then fell off the chart the next week, then re-entered at number 85. It peaked at number 43 in its 11th week and remained on the chart for a total of 18 weeks.

== Track listings ==
- 7" single - France, Netherlands, Spain
1. "Mélodie d'amour" — 4:11
2. "Lambamor" — 4:09
- 7" single - UK
1. "Mélodie d'amour" — 4:11
2. "Lambada" (7" version) — 3:24
- 12" maxi - France, UK
1. "Mélodie d'amour" (remix club) — 6:10 (remixed by Mark Mc Guire)
2. "Mélodie d'amour" (remix 45 t) — 3:56 (remixed by Mark Mc Guire)
3. "Mélodie d'amour" (instrumental version) — 3:56
- CD single - France
1. "Mélodie d'amour" — 4:11
2. "Lambamor" — 4:09
- CD single - Promo - Japan
1. "Mélodie d'amour" — 4:13
2. "Sopenala" — 4:28
- 7" single - Promo - Spain
1. "Mélodie d'amour" — 4:11

== Personnel ==
- Artwork – The Artifex Studio, Patrice Roger
- Design – Paul Ritter
- Photography – Andre Rau

== Charts ==
Weekly chart performance for "Mélodie d'amour"
Chart (1990)	Peak position
Belgium (Ultratop 50 Flanders)	43
Europe (European Hot 100)	43
France (SNEP)	11
Netherlands (Single Top 100)	15

== Certifications ==
Certifications for "Mélodie d'amour"
Region	Certification	Certified units/sales
France (SNEP)	Silver	200,000^{*}
^{*} Sales figures based on certification alone.

== Release history ==
Country	Date	Format	Label
France	1990	CD single	CBS
France	1990	7" single	CBS
France	1990	12" maxi	CBS
Netherlands	1990	7" single	CBS
UK	1990	7" single	CBS
UK	1990	12" maxi	CBS
Spain	1990	Promo 7" single	Epic
Spain	1990	7" single	Epic
Japan	1990	Promo CD single	Epic
