= Natal (song) =

1991 single by Chico & Roberta

Single by Chico & Roberta

from the album Frente a frente
- B-side: "Cor de Cetim"
- Released: 1991
- Recorded: 1990
- Genre: Latino, Worldbeat
- Length: 3:00 (single version); 4:20 (album version)
- Label: Carrere
- Songwriters: Jean-Claude Bonaventure, Monica Nogueira
- Producer: Jean-Claude Bonaventure

Chico & Roberta singles chronology
"Frente a frente" (1990)	"Natal" (1991)	"Festa no Mar" (1991)

"Natal" ("Christmas"), also titled "Esperança do Natal" ("Hope for Christmas") on the parent album and on the single cover back, is a 1990 song recorded by Brazilian duo Chico & Roberta. Written by Jean-Claude Bonaventure and Monica Nogueira, it was the released in December 1990 as the second single from the duo's first album Frente a frente, on which it appears as the second track. It was successful, becoming a top three hit.

== Chart performance ==
In France, "Natal" debuted at number 24 on the chart edition of 4 January 1991, while the duo's first single "Frente a frente" was at its peak of number five; then it performed the biggest single-week upward movement, gaining 15 positions to reach number nine, and entered the top five the next week. It peaked at number three for non consecutive three weeks, blocked by the international two hits "Wind of Change" and "Sadeness (Part I)". It totalled ten weeks in the top five and 21 weeks in the top 50. It achieved Gold status, awarded by the Syndicat National de l'Édition Phonographique, the French certificator, for over 250,000 units sold. On the Eurochart Hot 100, "Natal" entered at number 43 on 26 January 1991, peaked at number 14 in its tenth week, and totalled 18 weeks on the chart.

== Track listings ==
- CD single
1. "Esperança do Natal" — 3:00
2. "Cor de Cetim" — 4:00
- 7" single
1. "Esperança do Natal" — 3:00
2. "Cor de Cetim" — 4:00

== Credits ==
- Engineer – Alain Pype
- Photography – Sweeva Vigeno
- Producer – Jean-Claude Bonaventure

== Charts and sales ==
=== Weekly charts ===
Chart (1991)	Peak position
Europe (Eurochart Hot 100)	14
France (SNEP)	3

=== Year-end charts ===
Chart (1991)	Position
Europe (Eurochart Hot 100)	74

=== Certifications ===
Certifications for "Natal"
Region	Certification	Certified units/sales
France (SNEP)	Gold	250,000^{*}
^{*} Sales figures based on certification alone.

== Release history ==
Country	Date	Format	Label
France	1990	CD single	Carrere
France	1990	7" single	Carrere
