= Dançando Lambada =

Single by Kaoma

from the album Worldbeat
- B-side: "Lamba Caribe"
- Released: 6 October 1989
- Recorded: 1989
- Genre: World
- Length: 3:48
- Label: CBS
- Songwriter: Zé Maria
- Producer: Jean-Claude Bonaventure

Kaoma singles chronology
| "Lambada" (1989) | "Dançando Lambada" (1989) | "Mélodie d'amour" (1990) |

"Dançando Lambada" is a song by French-Brazilian group Kaoma with the Brazilian vocalist Loalwa Braz. It was the second single from Kaoma's debut album Worldbeat and followed the smash worldwide hit "Lambada". Released in October 1989, it achieved success, peaking at number four in France, number six in Switzerland and number 11 in Ireland, but was unable to duplicate the success of the band's previous hit single. A dub version of "Lambada" was available on the 12" and CD maxi.

== Critical reception ==
David Giles, reviewer of Music Week, presented "Dançando Lambada" as a "Parisian re-working of a Brazilian tune that should do well at club level", while wondering whether the sound's novelty can be maintained after "Lambada". To Lisa Tilston of Record Mirror, "this is as funky and Latinate and thoroughly good fun as "Lambada"". James Hamilton of the same magazine considered "Dançando Lambada" as being "less exotically swirling but doubtless easy to programme and useful follow-up for dirty dancing fans, presumably again in Portuguese although almost sounding more African than South American this time".

== Track listings ==
3" single

1. "Dançando Lambada" (single version) — 3:48
2. "Dançando Lambada" (version maxi) — 4:44
3. "Lamba Caribe" — 3:36

7" single

1. "Dançando Lambada" — 3:48
2. "Lamba caribe" — 3:35

12" maxi

1. "Dançando Lambada" — 4:45
2. "Lamba caribe" — 5:29

12" maxi

1. "Dancando Lambada" (LP version) — 4:44
2. "Lambada" (dub mix) — 4:25
3. "Lamba Caribe" (extended version) — 5:29

CD maxi

1. "Dancando Lambada" (single version) — 3:50
2. "Dancando Lambada" (version maxi) — 4:46
3. "Lamba Caribe" (extended version) — 5:31
4. "Lambada" (dub mix) — 4:28

== Charts and sales ==
=== Peak positions ===
| Chart (1989) | Peak position |
|---|---|
| Austria (Ö3 Austria Top 40) | 17 |
| Belgium (Ultratop 50 Flanders) | 11 |
| Finland (Suomen virallinen lista) | 2 |
| France (SNEP) | 4 |
| Ireland (IRMA) | 11 |
| Netherlands (Dutch Top 40) | 4 |
| Netherlands (Single Top 100) | 5 |
| Spain (AFYVE) | 7 |
| Switzerland (Schweizer Hitparade) | 6 |
| UK Singles (The Official Charts Company) | 62 |
| West Germany (GfK) | 18 |
| Chart (1990) | Position |
| US Billboard Hot Latin Tracks | 3 |

=== Year-end charts ===
| Chart (1990) | Position |
|---|---|
| Netherlands (Dutch Top 40) | 96 |
| US Billboard Hot 100 | 93 |

=== Certifications ===
Certifications for "Dançando Lambada"
| Region | Certification | Certified units/sales |
|---|---|---|
| France (SNEP) | Silver | 200,000^{*} |
^{*} Sales figures based on certification alone.
