= Danca tago-mago =

1991 single by Kaoma

"Dança Tago-Mago"

Single by Kaoma

from the album Tribal-Pursuit
- B-side: "Remix"
- Released: 1991
- Studio: Studio Accousti
- Genre: Latin
- Length: 3:45
- Label: Columbia
- Songwriters: Loalwa Braz, Michel Abihssir
- Producer: Jean-Claude Bonaventure

Kaoma singles chronology
"Mélodie d'amour" (1990)	"Dança Tago-Mago" (1991)	"Moço do Dende" (1992)

"Dança Tago-Mago" is a 1991 song recorded by French-Brazilian band Kaoma. Written by Loalwa Braz with music by Michel Abihssir, it was released in the summer of 1991 as the first single from their second album Tribal-Pursuit, on which it appears as the first track. It was a hit in Europe, reaching the top ten in France, Belgium, Portugal and the Netherlands, and became Kaoma's last hit worldwide.

== Chart performance ==
In France, "Dança Tago-Mago" debuted at number 44 on the chart edition of 27 July 1991, climbed quickly and reached the top ten three weeks later, peaked for a sole week at number three in its 11th week, and eventually cumulated ten weeks in the top ten and 18 in the top 50. It earned a Silver disc awarded by the Syndicat National de l'Édition Phonographique. "Dança Tago-Mago" also charted for 13 weeks on the Dutch Single Top 100, starting at number 79 on 13 July 1991 with two consecutive weeks at number eight, its highest position. Additionally, it stayed for nine weeks in Belgium (Flanders), with a peak at number ten, and was a number-three and number-six hit in Wallonia and Portugal, respectively. On the Eurochart Hot 100, it debuted at number 91 on 10 August 1991, reached a peak of number 17 in its sixth week and remained on the chart for a total of 16 weeks.

== Track listings ==
- 7" single - France, Netherlands
1. "Dança tago-mago" — 3:45
2. "Dança tago-mago" (remix radio) — 4:20
- 12" maxi - Netherlands, Spain
1. "Dança tago-mago" (remix club) — 5:30
2. "Dança tago-mago" — 3:45
3. "Dança tago-mago" (remix radio) — 4:20
- CD single - Europe
1. "Dança tago-mago" (Latine soul remix) — 7:45
2. "Dança tago-mago" — 4:09
- CD maxi - Europe
1. "Dança tago-mago" (remix club) — 5:30
2. "Dança tago-mago" — 3:45
3. "Dança tago-mago" (remix radio) — 4:20

== Personnel ==
- Backing vocal — Fatou Niang, Monica Nogueira
- Bass — Roger "Chyco" Dru
- Guitar — Jacky Arconte
- Drums and percussions — Michel Abihssira
- Keyboards — Jean-Claude Bonaventure
- Engineering — Alan Pype

== Charts ==
=== Weekly charts ===
Weekly chart performance for "Danca tago-mago"
Chart (1991)	Peak position
Belgium (Ultratop 50 Flanders)	10
Belgium (Ultratop 50 Wallonia)	3
Europe (European Hot 100)	17
France (SNEP)	3
Netherlands (Single Top 100)	8
Portugal (UNEVA)	6

=== Year-end charts ===
Year-end chart performance for "Danca tago-mago"
Chart (1991)	Position
Europe (Eurochart Hot 100)	86

== Certifications ==
Certifications for "Danca tago-mago"
Region	Certification	Certified units/sales
France (SNEP)	Silver	125,000^{*}
^{*} Sales figures based on certification alone.
