= Philippe Lafontaine =

Belgian singer and composer (born 1955)

- Born: Philippe Lafontaine; 24 May 1955 (age 71); Gosselies, Belgium
- Genres: Pop
- Occupations: Composer, singer
- Instrument: Voice
- Website: www.philippelafontaine.com

Philippe Lafontaine (born 24 May 1955) is a Belgian singer and composer.

== Biography ==
Lafontaine was born in Gosselies, Belgium. He spent a short time in a Jesuit college that he left at 17 to pursue a career in music. His first successes came from the writing and recording of jingles for television commercials, including Stella Artois and Coca-Cola. Throughout the 1980s he joined the musical comedy Brel en mille temps, touring in Dakar and Moscow, and then Leningrad and Saint Petersburg. Lafontaine released three albums. The song "Cœur de loup" was his first big hit and launched his career once and for all in Europe. The song garnered many awards in Belgium, France and Quebec. He represented Belgium in the Eurovision Song Contest 1990 in Zagreb with his own composition "Macédomienne" dedicated to his Macedonian wife, ending in 12th place. In 2001, he ventured for a 2nd time in musical comedy, composing Celia Fee, a musical for children and adults alike. His lyrics are known for being full of doubles entendres.

== Discography ==
=== Albums ===
1. Où...? (1978)
2. Pourvu Que Ça Roule (1981)
3. Charmez (1987)
4. Affaire (À Suivre) (1988)
5. Fa Ma No Ni Ma (1989)
6. Machine À Larmes (1992)
7. D'ici (1994)
8. Folklores Imaginaires (1996)
9. Compilation Attitudes (1997)
10. Pour Toujours (1998)
11. Fond De Scène Live (1999)
12. De L'autre Rive (2003)

=== Singles ===
1. 1978: "Cœur de Loup" (first version – face B Et Dire)
2. 1980: "Bronzé bronzé"
3. 1981: "Je ne crie pas, je ne pleure pas"
4. 1981: "Dis-le moi"
5. 1987: "Paramour"
6. 1989: "Cœur de loup" (see 1978 above)
7. 1989: "Alexis m'attend"
8. 1990: "FA MA NO NI MA"
9. 1990: "Macédomienne"
10. 1992: "L'amant tequila"
11. 1992: "Machine à larmes"
12. 1994: "L'hymne à la boule"
13. 1994: "Venez Venez Zuela"
14. 1995: "Eiaio"
15. 1995: "Si..."
16. 1998: "Bi debraye"

Preceded by Ingeborg with "Door de wind"	Belgium in the Eurovision Song Contest; 1990	Succeeded by Clouseau with "oGeef het op"
