= Tatjana Simić =

Serbian biologist (born 1964)

- Born: 23 February 1964; Šabac, SFR Yugoslavia
- Scientific career
- Fields: Medical sciences
- Institutions: Institute of Medical and Clinical Biochemistry; Faculty of Medicine, University of Belgrade

Tatjana Simić (born 23 February 1964) is a doctor of medical science, a full professor at the Faculty of Medicine, University of Belgrade and a corresponding member of the Serbian Academy of Sciences and Arts.

== Early life and education ==
Simić was born on 23 February 1964 in Šabac, to Dr. Petar Dragićević and Stanislava, a history teacher. She completed elementary and secondary school in Belgrade. She graduated from the Faculty of Medicine, University of Belgrade, in 1988 with an average grade of 9.75. She defended her master's thesis entitled "The influence of renal function on the activity of key enzymes of glutathione metabolism," under the supervision of Prof. Jasmina Mimić-Oka, in 1994 at the Faculty of Medicine in Belgrade. She also defended her doctoral dissertation at the same faculty in 1998, titled "Glutathione metabolism in renal parenchymal carcinoma," also under the supervision of Prof. Jasmina Mimić Oka. She passed the specialization exam in Clinical Biochemistry with excellent results in 2001.

== Academic career ==
Since 1989, she has been employed at the Institute of Medical and Clinical Biochemistry of the Faculty of Medicine, University of Belgrade (FMUB). She was elected assistant-trainee in Biochemistry in 1989, assistant professor in 1998, associate professor in 2003, and full professor in 2009.

Prof. Simić has been involved in teaching programs at the Integrated Academic Studies of Medicine in both Serbian and English, Doctoral Academic Studies (PhD) in Medical Sciences, Clinical Biochemistry specialization and subspecialization, undergraduate Nursing studies, and professional specialist studies. She has also contributed to Continuing Medical Education programs at FMUB.

She has served as the head of the Department for Clinical Biochemistry and the Department for Medical Biochemistry. She was also Chair of the Committee for Student Scientific Research and later served as Vice-Dean for Scientific Research at FMUB (2009–2018).

She was elected a corresponding member of the Serbian Academy of Sciences and Arts on 8 November 2018.

She is married to Prof. Dragan Simić, a cardiologist, and they have three sons: Nikola, Petar, and Stefan.

== Professional and scientific work ==
As Vice-Dean for Scientific Research, Simić worked to improve PhD education and internationalization of the FMUB. The PhD program received the ORPHEUS (Organisation of PhD Education in Biomedicine and Health Sciences in the European System) label, confirming compliance with international standards.

She initiated the course “Research Ethics” and founded the doctoral module “Tumor Biology and Oxidative Diseases.” She was instrumental in organizing the international ORPHEUS 2015 meeting in Belgrade and founded the Laboratory for Functional Genomics and Proteomics (2014), enabling advanced biomarker research and student training.

She has conducted postdoctoral research abroad, including at Heinrich Heine University Düsseldorf (Germany) as a DAAD fellow (2002) and at the Cancer Research Institute, University of Vienna (Austria) as an ÖAD fellow (2003). Since 2013, she has collaborated with Prof. Francesco Galli of the University of Perugia, who became a visiting professor at FMUB, leading to the first Erasmus+ project between the two universities (2017).

She has led two national research projects funded by the Serbian Ministry of Science and participated in international projects including FP7 UROMOL (2009–2012), COST BM0703 Cancer and Control of Genomic Integrity – Cangenin (2008–2012), and COST CA16113 CliniMARK (since 2018).

== Awards ==
She received the Serbian Medical Society Award for Scientific Research in 2016 and the Plaque for Scientific Contribution for the academic year 2021/2022.

== Memberships ==
She has organized programs for the Serbian Society for Free Radical and Mitochondrial Physiology and the Serbian Proteomics Society Symposium. She serves on the editorial boards of Journal of Medical Biochemistry, Srpski arhiv za celokupno lekarstvo (Serbian Archives of Medicine), and Medicinski podmladak.

Simić is a member of the Serbian Society for Free Radical and Mitochondrial Physiology (vice president since 2009), the Society for Free Radical Research (SFRR), the Serbian Proteomics Society (SePa, part of HuPO), the Serbian Cancer Research Society (SDIR), and the Serbian Medical Society.

She is also Chair of the Medical Sciences Council at the University of Belgrade and has served on the National Scientific Committee for Medical Sciences, the Commission for Academic Titles, and professional oncology committees of the Ministry of Health.
