= Worldbeat (album) =

Studio album by Kaoma
- Released: December 16, 1989
- Recorded: March–November 1989
- Genre: Latin
- Label: Epic Records

Kaoma chronology
Worldbeat (1989)	Tribal-pursuit (1991)

Professional ratings
Review scores
Source	Rating
AllMusic	3/5 stars
The Rolling Stone Album Guide	2.5/5 stars

Worldbeat is the debut album by Kaoma, released in 1989. It provided three hit singles, two of them achieving success worldwide: "Lambada", "Dançando Lambada" and "Mélodie d'amour". The album is composed of songs in Portuguese, Spanish and English. It was ranked in the top 25 in Switzerland, Germany, Norway, Australia and Austria. It topped the Billboard Latin Pop in the U.S.

== Critical reception ==
The album received generally positive reviews from critics. AllMusic wrote: "Not outstanding but definitely appealing, this CD effectively combines South American elements with dance music/disco, reggae and hip-hop. One hears Chic's influence on the funky 'Sopenala'." According to a review in Pan-European magazine Music and Media, the album "is of course made up of Latin tinged, summery dance songs with uplifting melodies". Music Week presented the album as "a collection of variations on the Lambada theme which never strays far from maximum accessibility. Pleasant and commercial, if not the real thing".

== Track listings ==
1. "Lambada" — 3:27
2. "Lambareggae" — 3:52
3. "Dançando Lambada" — 4:44
4. "Lambamor" — 4:09
5. "Lamba Caribe" — 4:07
6. "Mélodie d'amour" — 4:11
7. "Sindiang" — 3:58
8. "Sopenala" — 4:28
9. "Jambé Finète (Grille)" — 4:26
10. "Salsa Nuestra" — 4:38

== Charts ==
=== Weekly charts ===
Chart (1989–1990)	Peak position
Australian Albums (ARIA)	17
Austrian Albums (Ö3 Austria)	16
Dutch Albums (Album Top 100)	12
Finnish Albums (Suomen virallinen lista)	7
French Albums (SNEP)	14
German Albums (Offizielle Top 100)	21
Greek Albums (IFPI)	1
Norwegian Albums (VG-lista)	11
Swedish Albums (Sverigetopplistan)	41
Swiss Albums (Schweizer Hitparade)	6
US Billboard 200	40
US Latin Pop Albums (Billboard)	1

=== Year-end charts ===
Chart (1990)	Position
Dutch Albums (Album Top 100)	86

== Certifications and sales ==
Region	Certification	Certified units/sales
Brazil (Pro-Música Brasil)	Platinum	250,000^{*}
Canada (Music Canada)	Gold	50,000^{^}
France (SNEP)	2× Gold	200,000^{*}
Italy	—	500,000
Japan (RIAJ)	Platinum	200,000^{^}
Malaysia	—	90,000
Netherlands (NVPI)	Gold	50,000^{^}
Spain (Promusicae)	Platinum	100,000^{^}
Switzerland (IFPI Switzerland)	Gold	25,000^{^}
United States (RIAA)	Gold	600,000
United States (RIAA) video	Gold	50,000^{^}
Summaries
Worldwide	—	+15,000,000
^{*} Sales figures based on certification alone.^{^} Shipments figures based on certification alone.

== See also ==
- List of number-one Billboard Latin Pop Albums from the 1990s
- List of best-selling Latin albums
