= Los Kjarkas =

Bolivian folk band

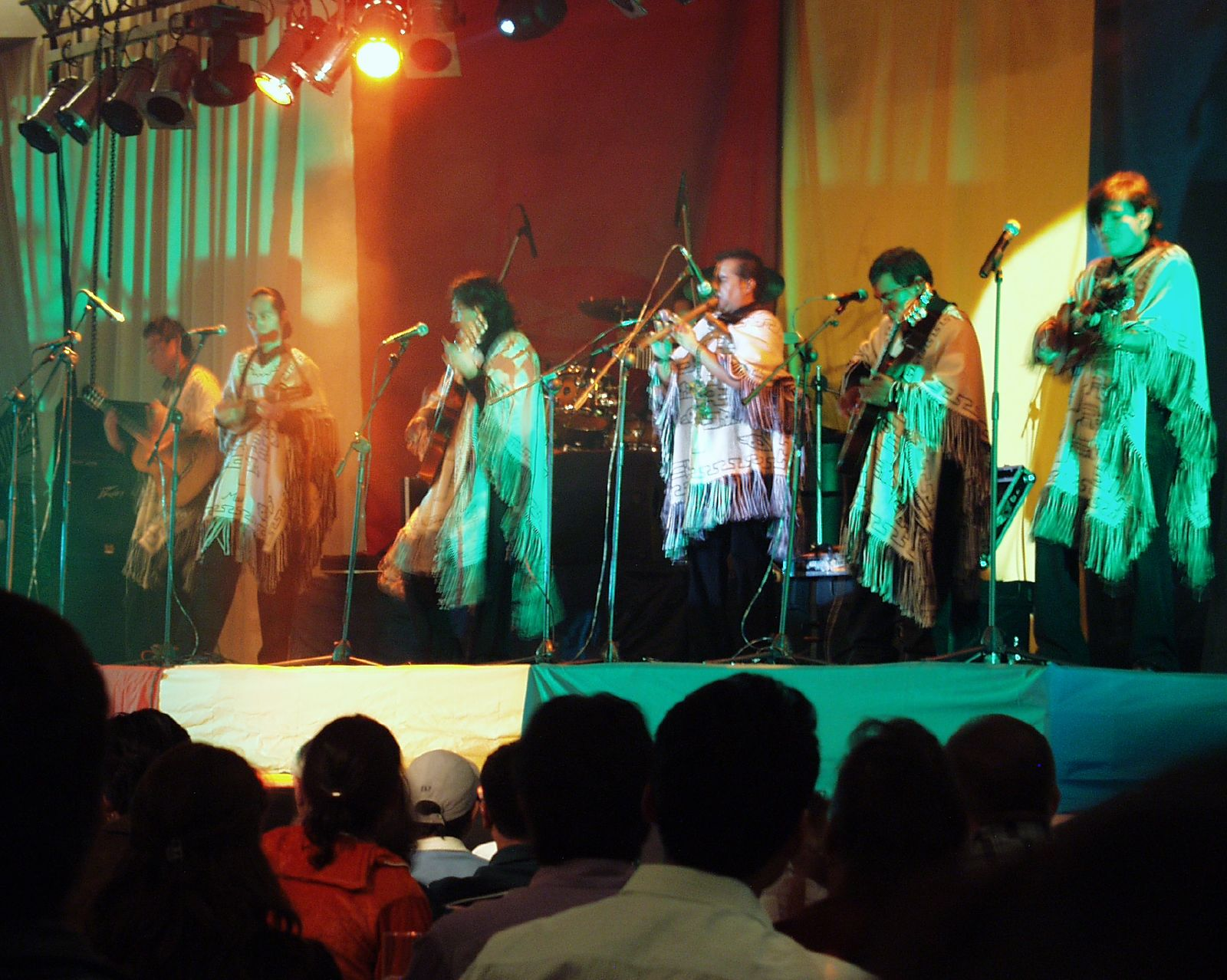
- Los Kjarkas performing in 2002

Background information
- Origin: Bolivia
- Genre: Andean folk
- Years active: 1965–present
- Labels: Lauro, Discolandia, ANS Records, Heriba, Tumi Music
- Members: Gonzalo Hermosa González; Elmer Hermosa González; Gastón Guardia Bilboa; Makoto Shishido; Lin Angulo; Gonzalo Hermosa Camacho
- Past members: Ramiro de la Zerda; Ulises Hermosa González; Eduardo Yáñez Loayza; Rolando Malpartida Porcel; José Luis Morales Rodríguez; Fernando Torrico; Edwin Castellanos; Julio Lavayen; Alcides Mejia; Miguel Mengoa; Edgar Villaroel; Eddy Carpio; Toño Canelas
- Website: Official Site

Los Kjarkas is a Bolivian band from Capinota, Cochabamba. It is one of the most popular Andean folk music bands in the country's history. Among the styles they play are saya, caporal, tuntuna, huayno, and carnavales. The instruments the band uses include the charango, quena, zampoña, ronroco, guitar, and bombo.

== Name origin ==
The name Kjarkas comes from the Quechua word meaning “brave”, so the definition would be brave men or men with courage.

== History ==
The band's leader has always been singer, guitarist and songwriter Gonzalo Hermosa González, who formed the band with his brothers Élmer Hermosa González and Ulises Hermosa González, as well as Gastón Guardia Bilboa and Ramiro de la Zerda in 1965.

=== Llorando se fue, and the Lambada plagiarism controversy ===
In the mid-1980s, Los Kjarkas was at their peak of their popularity. Then suddenly a plagiarism case would catapult them even further. In 1989, a French group called Kaoma popularized a new dance called Lambada, but the song Lambada was actually an unauthorized cover of Llorando se fue, composed by Ulises Hermosa and Gonzalo Hermosa and sung by Los Kjarkas in the saya rhythm. The song had reached Kaoma after being covered by two other musicians: Cuarteto Continental (1984), and Márcia Ferreira (1986), the latter being a legally authorized adaptation into Portuguese. Then Jean Georgakarakos and Olivier Lorsac discovered Ferreira's version in Porto Seguro, Brazil, and when they returned to Paris, they registered the composition under the name Lambada, and with a fictional composer called Chico de Oliveira, which turned out to be a pseudonym for Olivier Lamotte d'Incamps, aka Olivier Lorsac, one of the producers of Kaoma.

The Bolivian group had registered the song in Germany's GEMA, and afterwards both Los Kjarkas and Márcia Ferreira sued Kaoma. And that would lead to the recognition by French courts that they were the rightful owners of the song's copyrights. Kaoma had to pay a large financial compensation to Los Kjarkas and Márcia Ferreira.

The incident helped Los Kjarkas become even better known in Europe, Asia, and the Americas.

The song was sampled by multiple artists afterwards, including on Don Omar's "Taboo" and on Jennifer Lopez's single "On the Floor".

=== Afterwards ===
Ulises Hermosa died in Houston, Texas, United States on 3 April 1992. And De la Zerda left the group to form Grupo Fortaleza. They were replaced by Eduardo Yáñez Loayza, Rolando Malpartida Porcel and José Luis Morales Rodríguez.

In addition, the song "Wayayay" was covered by Tarkan as "Gelip Te Halimi Gördün Mü?" ("Did You Ever Come To See My Situation?" in Turkish) at "Yine Sensiz" ("Without You Again" in Turkish), whose debut album was in 1992.

The group's music was also used for the Argentine-Dutch film Bolivia (2001). The group's cultural heritage is passed down in the next generation of Hermosa blood with the popular youth group band Chila Jatun, made up by the sons of this influential Bolivian group.

By 2002, Lin Angulo, Gonzalo Hermosa Camacho, and Japanese-born Makoto Shishido had replaced Yáñez, Porcel, and Rodríguez. Makoto joined the band after seeing them play in Japan. In the later 2000s, Élmer Hermosa was diagnosed with diabetes. In 2010, Edwin Castellanos, who was in the band from 1983 to 1995, became mayor of the city of Cochabamba.

Kjarkas have founded two schools teaching Andean folk music: the Musical School of Kjarkas (Lima, Peru) and La Fundación Kjarkas (Ecuador). They have toured across Japan, Europe, Scandinavia, the United States, South America, and Australia, and have composed over 350 songs. Among their most popular are "Imillitay", "Al Final", "Canto a la mujer de mi pueblo", and "Pequeño Amor".

They have been awarded the Banner of Gold by the Bolivian government.

== Discography ==
Studio albums

- Bolivia (1976)
- Andrés Tierra Sentimiento (1977)
- Kutimuy (vuelve) (1977)
- Sueño milenario de los Andes (1978)
- Cóndor Mallcu (1980)
- Desde el alma de mi pueblo (1981)
- Canto a la mujer de mi pueblo (1981)
- Sol de los Andes (1983)
- Pueblos perdidos (1984)
- Desde el Japón (1985)
- El amor y la libertad (1987)
- Chuquiago Marka (1988)
- Génesis Aymara (1989)
- Sin palabras (1989)
- Los Andes... descubrió su rostro milenario (1990)
- Tecno Kjarkas (1991)
- El árbol de mi destino (1991)
- Hermanos (1993)
- A los 500 años (1994)
- Quiquin... Pacha (Por un mundo nuevo) (1995)
- Por siempre... (1997)
- El líder de los humildes (1998)
- Que no muera la tradición (1998)
- Kaluyos y pasacalles (2000)
- Lección de vida (2001)
- Navidad en los Andes (2001)
- Cuecas y bailecitos (2002)
- 35 años (2006)
- 40 años después... (2012)
- La leyenda viva (2016)
- Disco Dorado - Rumbo al medio siglo (2019)

Live albums

- En vivo desde Europa (1982)
- 30 años (2001)
- Más allá (2004)
- En retrospectiva (2020)

Contributing artist

- The Rough Guide to the Music of the Andes (1996, World Music Network)
