= Reset (Norwegian group) =

Norwegian musical group

- Origin: Norway
- Genres: Eurodance
- Years active: 1996–2002; 2006–present
- Labels: Dance Pool; Playground Music (Scandinavia); Edel Music (Germany); Good Intentions (Europe)
- Members: Thomas Borgvang; Stig Antonsen; Camilla Alvestad
- Past members: Trude Barstad; Christian Onshus
- Website: Official website

Reset is a Norwegian Eurodance group. The group started as a one-man studio project in 1994 by Stig Antonsen, but was never finished in the end. He decided to start again in 1996 with two additional members, Trude Barstad and Christian Onshus. They released a single in the summer of 1996 called "U R My Dream" on the Sony Music label Dance Pool. The group split up after only six months together.

In late 1998 Stig was working with Camilla Henningsen on "Oh What A Day", a song that later would be included on the "Play" album. They decided to start Reset again and called in Thomas Borgvang, a local radio DJ. The first song that was recorded with all three members was "Makin' Me Feel". The group performed their first gig in December 1998 at the NRJ Christmas-party at the Oslo Spektrum together with artists such as Snap!, Sash!, Solid Base and Jocelyn Brown.

Two months later, they signed a four-album deal with the German record-company Edel Records. The single "Blue" was released in June 1999 and is the biggest selling Norwegian dance single, selling 18,000 copies. Their next single "Get Me" also became a huge success and reached a top 5 position on the Norwegian chart. In November 1999, Reset released their debut album, Play, and a few months later they received a Gold record for the album in Norway. They also released "Makin' Me Feel" as a single in 2000.

The group toured most parts of the country and appeared in almost every TV show in Norway. In 2001, they presented a new live show, a new logo and new songs from the forthcoming album, released in late summer 2001. The first single from the new album was "Calling You". The song spent 11 weeks on the Norwegian Top 20, and broke all records on the National Chart Show "10 I Skuddet". They became the first group for over 30 years that has been number one on the chart for 20 weeks without any interruption. The second single from the album, "Say I'm The One" was released on May 7, 2001. Then followed by the single "Say Yeah" and promo single "Wings of Love".

In 2002, the group then took a break to focus on solo projects. In early 2009, they teamed up again, and their single "Just Say Yeah" was released on December 1, 2009.

== Albums ==
| Year | Album | Chart positions | |
| Year | Album | NO | DE |
|---|---|---|---|
| 1999 | Play | 15 | - |
| 2001 | Calling You | - | - |

== Singles ==
| Year | Title | Album | Chart positions | |
| Year | Title | Album | NO | DE |
|---|---|---|---|---|
| 1996 | "U R My Dream" | | - | - |
| 1999 | "Blue" | Play | 5 | - |
| 1999 | "Get Me" | Play | 7 | - |
| 2000 | "Makin' Me Feel" | Play | - | - |
| 2000 | "Calling You" | Calling You | 7 | - |
| 2001 | "Say I'm The One" | Calling You | 6 | - |
| 2001 | "Say Yeah!" | Calling You | 18 | - |
| 2002 | "Wings of Love" | Calling You | - | - |
| 2009 | "Just Say Yeah" | | - | - |
| 2011 | "One Love" | | - | - |
| 2011 | "So High" | | - | - |
