= Vogue Records =

American record label (1946–1947)

The first and most popular release from Vogue in the U.S.

Vogue Records was a short-lived United States–based record label of the 1940s, noted for the artwork embedded in the records themselves. Founded in 1946 as part of Sav-Way Industries of Detroit, Michigan, the discs were initially a hit, because of the novelty of the colorful artwork, and the improved sound compared to the shellac records dominant at the time. The discs were manufactured by first sandwiching printed illustrations around a core of aluminum, then coating both sides with clear vinyl upon which the grooves were stamped.

The company went out of business the following year, having released between 67 and 74 double-sided 78 rpm gramophone records. Some of the Vogue issues were re-releases of recordings originally issued by other companies.

The colorful artwork on the records have made Vogue Records a collector's item.

Two releases on the Vogue label have been the source of much collector debate over the years: the 1946 releases by the country swing group the Down Homers "Who's Gonna Kiss You When I'm Gone?" and "Boogie Woogie Yodel" have often been cited as featuring the earliest recorded performances by future rock and roll pioneer Bill Haley, who was a member of the group in 1946. However this rumor was later debunked by surviving members of the Down Homers as well as Haley researchers. Nonetheless, the Vogue Down Homers releases are considered among the more collectable of the label's releases.

== See also ==
- List of record labels
- Unusual types of gramophone records
