= Llorando se fue =

Single by Los Kjarkas

from the album Canto a la mujer de mi pueblo
- A-side: Wa ya yay
- B-side: "Llorando se fue"
- Released: 1981 (album); 1982 (single); 2004 (Digital)
- Recorded: 1981
- Genre: Afro-Bolivian Saya, Andean pop
- Length: 4:03
- Label: Lauro, EMI (France)
- Songwriters: Ulises Hermosa; Gonzalo Hermosa (original music & lyrics)

Official audio
- "Llorando se fue" on YouTube

"Llorando se fue" (Spanish pronunciation: [ʝoˈɾan.do se ˈfwe]; English: Crying, he/she went away) is a Bolivian folk song recorded by Los Kjarkas in 1981 on the album Canto a la mujer de mi pueblo and released as a B-side of the "Wa ya yay" single in 1982.

The song has been very popular in Latin America since the 1980s and has been covered several times. It was later covered by many artists, including Cuarteto Continental in 1984, Brazilian singer Márcia Ferreira in 1986 and the French-Brazilian pop group Kaoma in 1989. Kaoma's version was an unauthorized version of the song and that led to successful lawsuits against Kaoma's producers Olivier Lorsac, Jean Karakos and Jean-Claude Bonaventure.

Over the years, the song has been covered and adapted by several artists, including Ivete Sangalo in 2005, Wisin & Yandel with "Pam Pam" in 2006, Don Omar with "Taboo" in 2011, and Jennifer Lopez with "On the Floor" that same year.

== Original version by Los Kjarkas ==
According to Gonzalo Hermosa, Los Kjarkas had based Llorando se fue on a small, nostalgic Andean melody. Their song, sung in Spanish, was written in a sad and slow Saya rhythm, which is a type of Afro-Bolivian music.

The original recording featured an A motif of 3 bars and a B motif of 4 bars, shown here transposed to the key of A minor:

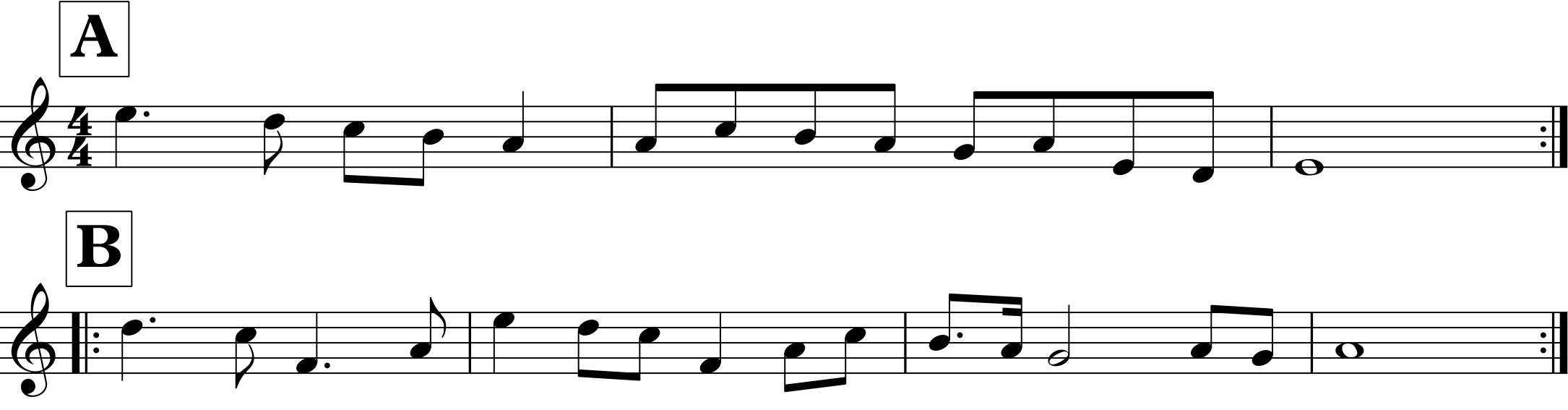

The irregular 3-bar length of the A motif is a distinctive feature that was retained in "Lambada", though some other versions have padded the motif to a more conventional 4 bars. "On the Floor" takes such an approach, and omits the B motif entirely.

By 1990, Los Kjarkas had authorized the translation of the song to 42 languages. They also performed a Spanish-Japanese bilingual version of the song (keeping the Saya rhythm) in concerts and for the music video made in 1990. The bilingual version was recorded on their 1996 album Sentimiento Andino, Volume 2 and on their 2001 compilation album 30 Años Sólo Se Vive Una Vez, Volume 1. Los Kjarkas also re-recorded "Llorando se fue" as an upbeat dance version for their 1991 album Tecno Kjarkas (Tecno Andino) and in 2010 with the Bolivian group Voltaje.

=== Single track listing ===
==== France 7" 45 RPM ====
Label: B.M. Productions/CBS (1989)

===== Side 1 =====
1. "Llorando se fue" (Saya) — (G. Hermosa, U. Hermosa) — 4:03

===== Side 2 =====
1. "Tata Sabaya" (Huayno) — (U. Hermosa) — 2:28

==== Japan 3" (8cm) CD ====
Label: Polydor (1990)

1. "Llorando se fue" — (G. Hermosa, U. Hermosa)
2. "Wa ya yay" (Huayño) — (U. Hermosa)

== Cuarteto Continental version ==
In 1984, an upbeat version of the song introducing the accordion was released by the Peruvian group Cuarteto Continental, Cuarteto Continental adapted the song to the cumbia rhythm and Alberto Maraví introduced a new arrangement for the song. This version was part of their LP Fiesta de Cumbias, which was released that year. That was the first upbeat version of the song. The version was notable for being the first to introduce the accordion.

This arrangement would be the basis of all the other covers of this song by other artists, including by Kaoma.

== Márcia Ferreira version ==
The first Portuguese version of Llorando se fue, as Chorando Se Foi, was released by Brazilian singer-songwriter Márcia Ferreira in 1986 on her self-titled third album. She was inspired to make a Portuguese version of Llorando se fue when she performed one day in Tabatinga in the Federal District, and her musicians accompanied a performance by the Peruvian band Cuarteto Continental, where they performed the song. The musicians were captivated by the melody and bought the record, giving it to Márcia, and suggesting she cover the song, which she did, following all legal procedures.

She co-wrote her version, Chorando Se Foi, with José Ari as the first legally authorized Portuguese version of the and adjusted the song to the Lambada dance rhythm popular in Brazil. Her version was certified platinum in Brazil. With the success of her cover version and musical career, she became known in Brazil as "A Rainha da Lambada" ("The Queen of Lambada").

== Kaoma version ==
In 1989, French band Kaoma had a chart-topping hit with their dance music single Lambada, a cover of Brazilian singer-songwriter Márcia Ferreira's 1986 dance hit Chorando Se Foi, which itself was a legally authorized Portuguese version.

However, Kaoma's version was unauthorized and didn't even credit the rightful composers, and Kaoma also made changes to Márcia Ferreira's lyrics. Kaoma's version was originally credited to a fictitious composer with the pseudonym of Chico de Oliveira, and the publishing rights of this composer were registered at the French Société des auteurs, compositeurs et éditeurs de musique. Chico de Oliveira was a pseudonym for Olivier Lorsac, as revealed by French newspaper Le Monde. Then Los Kjarkas denounced the plagiarism to Spanish newspaper El País.

Both Los Kjarkas and Márcia Ferreira successfully sued Kaoma for copyright infringement, winning in court, and the case led to both receiving financial compensation from Kaoma. In 1991, a French court ruled that the correct original authors should appear on all future releases. Now the song is credited to Ulises Hermosa, Gonzalo Hermosa, Alberto Maraví, Márcia Ferreira and José Ari.

== Other versions ==
Overall, several covers of Llorando se fue have been released:

- 1984 - Tropical Pingüino
- 1985 - Juan "Corazón" Ramón from the album Cada Día Mejor
- 1985 - Don Medardo y sus Players from the album Lo Mejor del Año, Vol. 4
- 1987 - Sonora Andacollo from the album Norte Tropical - Lambada
- 1987 - Terramérica from the LP Arapuê
- 1988 - Los Hermanos Rosario from the album Otra Vez
- 1988 - Sonora Junior L. Palacios from the album Que Siga La Cumbia, Vol. 3
- 1989 - Los Flamers from the album Gran Reventon Gran, Vol. 5
- 2011 - Don Omar's "Taboo" from the album Meet the Orphans
- 2011 - Jennifer Lopez's "On the Floor" from the album Love? incorporates quite a few elements
