= Lambada (song) =

1989 single by Kaoma

Single by Kaoma

from the album Worldbeat
- Released: 11 July 1989
- Genre: Lambada
- Length: 3:28
- Label: CBS, Epic
- Songwriters: Ulises Hermosa, Gonzalo Hermosa, Alberto Maraví, Márcia Ferreira, José Ari
- Producer: Jean-Claude Bonaventure

Kaoma singles chronology
"Lambada" (1989)	"Dançando Lambada" (1989)

Music video
- "Lambada" on YouTube

"Lambada", also known as "Chorando Se Foi (Lambada)" or "Llorando se fue (Lambada)" (both meaning "crying, he/she went away" in Portuguese and Spanish, respectively), is a song by French-Brazilian pop group Kaoma. With vocals by Brazilian vocalist Loalwa Braz, the song was released as Kaoma's debut single and included on their debut album, Worldbeat. The accompanying music video, filmed in June 1989 in Cocos beach in the city of Trancoso, in the Brazilian state of Bahia, featured the Brazilian child duo Chico & Roberta. The song became a huge hit in Europe and many parts of the world.

Sung in Portuguese, it is a cover of the 1986 hit "Chorando Se Foi", by Márcia Ferreira, itself based on the Cuarteto Continental version of "Llorando se fue" (the first upbeat version of the song introducing the accordion), released in 1984 through the Peruvian record label INFOPESA and produced by Alberto Maraví; both songs were adapted from the 1981 original song by Bolivian group Los Kjarkas.

At the time of release, "Lambada" was regarded as the most successful European single in the history of CBS Records, with sales of 1.8 million copies in France and more than four million across Europe. Overall, "Lambada" sold five million copies worldwide in 1989 alone, according to the New York Times.

However, Kaoma did not credit the original songwriters and also made changes to Márcia Ferreira's lyrics. This ended up leading to successful plagiarism lawsuits.

1989 and 1990 are considered to be the lambada genre's boom years, although the lambada rhythm had existed for much longer. The song became one of the most covered songs worldwide.

== Background ==
Kaoma's Lambada was an unauthorized version of the song "Llorando se fue", originally composed, performed and recorded by the Bolivian Andean folk group Los Kjarkas in 1981. The song's lyrics and music had been lawfully registered by the founding members of Los Kjarkas, Gonzalo and Ulises Hermosa, in 1981 at the Bolivian Institute of Culture (IBC) and in 1985 at Germany's Music and Authors Society (GEMA).

According to Gonzalo, Los Kjarkas had based "Llorando se fue" on a small, nostalgic Andean melody. Their song was written in a sad and slow Afro-Bolivian Saya rhythm.

In 1984, an upbeat version of "Llorando se fue", introducing the accordion, was released by the Peruvian group Cuarteto Continental as part of their LP Fiesta de Cumbias, and the arrangement Alberto Maraví (the producer of Cuarteto Continental's version) introduced to the song was later copied by Kaoma.

The first Portuguese version of "Llorando se fue" – as "Chorando Se Foi" – was released by Brazilian singer Márcia Ferreira in 1986 on her third album.

In March 1988, during their visit to Porto Seguro, Bahia, Brazil, French managers Olivier Lamotte d'Incamps (known as Olivier Lorsac) and Jean Georgakarakos (known as Jean Karakos) discovered the lambada music genre, and Márcia Ferreira's version. The two bought the musical rights to over 400 lambada songs from the Brazilian music publisher Continental. Lorsac and Georgakarakos then returned to Paris, and eventually the two formed the band Kaoma in France, which included musicians from Brazil, Africa and the Caribbean.

Prior to Kaoma's 1989 release of the song, several covers of "Llorando se fue" had been released as dance tracks.

== Release ==
Kaoma released the song on July 1989. In the Kaoma single version and on the album Worldbeat, the composition of the music and the writing of the lyrics was credited to a fictional composer called Chico de Oliveira, in addition to making significant changes to Márcia Ferreira's lyrics. The song had been registered at SACEM as if it was written by Chico de Oliveira. In the American release, there was a note at the bottom of the album stating: "Lambada comes from Saya, a Bolivian folk music. Ulysse and Gonzalo Hermosa and Olivier Lorsac contributed to its realisation."

== Music video ==
The accompanying music video for "Lambada" was directed by Olivier Lorsac and it was filmed in June 1989, on Tago Mago Island, near Ibiza, Spain in the Mediterranean Sea, and on Cocos Beach in the city of Trancoso, Bahia, Brazil. The video was paid for by Orangina, who would also use it in a television advertisement in France.

It featured the Brazilian child duo Chico & Roberta as love interests. As a semi-plot, Roberta's father does not want her to hang out with Chico, but Loalwa mends the situation among the three.

== Chart performance ==
"Lambada" became a worldwide summer hit, selling over five million copies in 1989 and was part of the Lambada dance craze. It reached No. 1 in several European countries, as well as No. 4 on both the UK Singles Chart and Irish Singles Chart, No. 5 on the Australia ARIA Singles Chart, and No. 46 on both the US Billboard Hot 100 and Cash Box Top 100. As of 1991, combined sales of the album and the single had reached one million records sold in Italy. "Lambada" was the 37th best-selling single of the United Kingdom during 1989. In France, it topped the chart for 12 weeks and sold 1.8 million copies.

== Track listings ==
7-inch single

1. "Lambada" – 3:28
2. "Lambada" (instrumental) – 3:48
1. "Lambada" (DJ Petro Panayoti aka Mixmaster Remix) 1989 – 4:50

12-inch maxi

1. "Lambada" (extended version) – 6:44
2. "Lambada" (instrumental version) – 3:48
3. "Lambada" (DJ Stigma-Berveni Remix) – 3:55
1. "Lambada" (DJ Petro Panayoti Club Remix) 2019 – 6:00

== Charts ==
=== Weekly charts ===
Chart (1989–1990)	Peak position
Australia (ARIA)	5
Austria (Ö3 Austria Top 40)	1
Belgium (Ultratop 50 Flanders)	1
Canada Top Singles (RPM)	78
Canada Dance/Urban (RPM)	3
Denmark (IFPI)	2
Europe (Eurochart Hot 100)	1
Finland (Suomen virallinen lista)	1
France (SNEP)	1
Greece (IFPI)	1
Iceland (Íslenski Listinn Topp 10)	2
Ireland (IRMA)	4
Italy (Musica e dischi)	1
Italy Airplay (Music & Media)	1
Luxembourg (Radio Luxembourg)	2
Netherlands (Dutch Top 40)	1
Netherlands (Single Top 100)	1
New Zealand (Recorded Music NZ)	10
Norway (VG-lista)	1
Portugal (AFP)	1
Spain (AFYVE)	1
Sweden (Sverigetopplistan)	1
Switzerland (Schweizer Hitparade)	1
UK Singles (Official Charts)	4
US Billboard Hot 100	46
US 12-inch Singles Sales (Billboard)	6
US Dance Club Play (Billboard)	21
US Hot Latin Tracks (Billboard)	1
US Cash Box Top 100	46
West Germany (GfK)	1

Chart (2026)	Peak position
Netherlands Airplay (Dutch Charts)	44

=== Year-end charts ===
Chart (1989)	Position
Austria (Ö3 Austria Top 40)	3
Belgium (Ultratop)	1
Europe (Eurochart Hot 100)	1
Netherlands (Dutch Top 40)	2
Netherlands (Single Top 100)	1
Portugal (AFP)	2
Switzerland (Schweizer Hitparade)	4
UK Singles (OCC)	34
West Germany (Media Control)	5

Chart (1990)	Position
Australia (ARIA)	24
Canada Dance/Urban (RPM)	23
Europe (Eurochart Hot 100)	71
Germany (Media Control)	26
US 12-inch Singles Sales (Billboard)	47
US Hot Latin Tracks (Billboard)	7

== Certifications and sales ==
Region	Certification	Certified units/sales
Australia (ARIA)	Gold	35,000^{^}
Belgium	—	300,000
Brazil	—	700,000
Canada (Music Canada)	Gold	50,000^{^}
Colombia	—	500,000
France (SNEP)	Platinum	1,800,000
Germany (BVMI)	2× Platinum	1,000,000^{^}
Japan (RIAJ) Physical single	2× Platinum	200,000^{^}
Malaysia	—	80,000
Mexico	—	750,000
Netherlands (NVPI)	Platinum	100,000^{^}
Portugal (AFP)	2× Platinum	80,000^{^}
Spain 1989 sales	—	200,000
Spain (Promusicae) digital	Gold	30,000^{‡}
Sweden (GLF)	Platinum	50,000^{^}
Switzerland (IFPI Switzerland)	Gold	25,000^{^}
United Kingdom (BPI)	Gold	400,000^{^}
United States	—	2,000,000
Summaries
Europe 1989-1990 sales	—	4,000,000
^{^} Shipments figures based on certification alone.^{‡} Sales+streaming figures based on certification alone.

== Plagiarism controversy and lawsuit ==
On 30 August 1989, French newspaper Le Monde disclosed that the composer listed in the credits of the single and album and registered at SACEM (the French music rights society), Chico de Oliveira, was actually a pseudonym for Olivier Lamotte d'Incamps (aka Olivier Lorsac).

After that disclosure, Los Kjarkas accused Kaoma of plagiarism, and spoke to Spanish newspaper El País about the situation. Meanwhile, Márcia Ferreira appeared in multiple Brazilian programs and spoke about the situation, including in the TV program Domingão do Faustão, where she said that Kaoma was simply a copy of Márcia Ferreira, and then she proceeded to perform her 1986 version live at the show.

The unauthorized cover by Kaoma resulted in successful lawsuits for plagiarism, the first being in 1990 by Los Kjarkas, against Kaoma's producer Jean-Claude Bonaventure, and the second in 1991, where a French court ruled that co-writers Márcia Ferreira and José Ari were the authors of the Portuguese version, despite Kaoma making some changes to the lyrics. Lorsac and Georgakarakos admitted they had heard a "remarkably similar" song in Porto Seguro, and this was recognized by the French court to be Márcia Ferreira's 1986 version. Márcia Ferreira won the suit she filed in Paris, France, on 7 March 1991. The musicians of the band Kaoma were not to blame for the case. Kaoma's musicians were only employees of the French producers. Lorsac was reprimanded by SACEM for his actions.

Nowadays, the song is credited to the Hermosa brothers (as authors), Alberto Maraví (the one who made the arrangement on the Cuarteto Continental cover, which was later copied by other artists), Márcia Ferreira and José Ari.

== "Lambada 3000" (Gregor Salto remix) ==
"Lambada 3000"

Single by Gregor Salto and Kaoma
- Released: July 2009
- Genre: Latin house
- Length: 2:53
- Label: G-Rex Music
- Songwriters: Chico de Oliveira, Gonzalo Hermosa-Gonzales
- Producer: Gregor Salto

Gregor Salto and Kaoma singles chronology
"Love Is My Game" (2007)	"Lambada 3000" (2009)	"Step By Step" (2009)

In July 2009, a new Summer remixed version of the track by house and latin jazz DJ Gregor Salto called "Lambada 3000" (billed as Gregor Salto & Kaoma) was released in the Benelux. Loalwa Braz, the original singer of the song, was asked to provide new vocals for the remix. The track became Salto's second Top 20 hit in the Dutch Top 40, and third entry in the chart, peaking at #12. Its music video was filmed in May 2009, in Curaçao and premiered in June 2009.

=== Track listings and formats ===
CD maxi single (iTunes EP)
No.	Title	Length
1.	"Lambada 3000" (Radio Mix)	2:53
2.	"Lambada 3000" (Olinda Radio Mix)	3:35
3.	"Lambada 3000" (Original Club Mix)	4:58
4.	"Lambada 3000" (Olinda Mix)	6:40
5.	"Lambada 3000" (Arena Mix)	7:41

Remixes, Part 1
No.	Title	Length
1.	"Lambada 3000" (Bassjackers and Ralvero Remix)	6:10
2.	"Lambada 3000" (Funkin Matt Remix)	5:47
3.	"Lambada 3000" (Groovenatics Remix)	6:27
4.	"Lambada 3000" (Jason Cheiron Mix)	6:09

Remixes, Part 2
No.	Title	Length
1.	"Lambada 3000" (Olav Basoski Remix)	6:13
2.	"Lambada 3000" (Rishi Bass Remix)	5:52
3.	"Lambada 3000" (Real El Canario Remix)	5:45
4.	"Lambada 3000" (Wax-a-fix Remix)	5:26

=== Charts ===
Chart (2009)	Peak position
Belgium (Ultratip Bubbling Under Flanders)	8
Netherlands (Dutch Top 40)	12

== Cover versions, samples and mentions ==
In France, the song was covered by another music group, Carioca, which peaked only at No. 22 on 9 September 1989 and remained in the charts for nine weeks. It was also covered, around that time, by other Brazilian singers, such as Fafá de Belém, whose 1985 album Aprendizes da Esperança was an early example of the lambada music genre. In the same year, a cover by Regina appeared on the album Lambada Tropical (credited to Chico Mendes) and on the compilation albums Max Mix 9 and Hits '89.

The song was also covered by Italian singer Salvo Nicolosi, in a version called Lambada (Una Stanza E Noi), also in 1989.

In December 1989, the renowned Egyptian singer and composer, Amr Diab, introduced a fresh perspective to Lambada's melody. He released "Leily" from the album Shawakna, reimagining the melody with a unique oriental essence. His innovative approach introduced new melodic elements, harmoniously blended with contemporary arrangements.

The song "Sochna Kya" from the 1990 Hindi film Ghayal sampled the melody of Lambada. Japanese singer Akemi Ishii released a cover version in Japanese on 21 March 1990, which peaked at No. 16 on the Oricon charts and was re-recorded in 2011. Also in 1990, American experimental rock band Sun City Girls covered the song with the title "The Shining Path", for their album Torch of the Mystics.

Turkish singer Cengiz Coşkuner recorded a version of the song, with lyrics written by Ülkü Aker, and it featured on his album Seni Gidi Seni & Kapris Yapma, which was also released in 1990. Another Turkish singer, Rüya Çağla, wrote and recorded a version for use as the title track of her album Lambada, also released in 1990. In 1990, Hong Kong DJ Aling Choi Ling Ling released a cover version "人生嘉年華" ("Carnival of Life") in Cantonese.

The song was used in 1994 in the Arcade video game 'Best of Best' by the Korean company SunA.

Jamaican musician Elephant Man released "Hate Mi" in 2004, which samples Lambada.

Brazilian singer-songwriter Ivete Sangalo recorded a version of "Chorando Se Foi (Lambada)" for her 2005 album As Super Novas, released as its third single, becoming no. 1 in Brazil; she also recorded the song on her second live album in 2007.

In 2006, Wisin & Yandel sampled the song in "Pam Pam". Mexican singer Mariana Seoane recorded her cover of the song for her 2007 album Está de Fiesta... Atrévete!!. Japanese band Seikima-II's frontman Demon Kakka recorded their version of Lambada in Japanese/Spanish for his 2008 album GIRLS' ROCK Hakurai.

In 2011, Don Omar sampled the song, and also sang part of Kaoma's lyrics in his single "Taboo". Also in 2011, Jennifer Lopez sampled Lambada on her hit song "On the Floor", which reached No. 3 in the Billboard Hot 100 and topped many worldwide charts.

In 2024, Spanish singer Lola Índigo released "La Reina", which samples the melody of "Chorando se Foi".

== See also ==
- List of best-selling singles by country
- List of best-selling Latin singles
