= Kaoma =

French pop group

- Kaoma in 1998

Background information
- Origin: Paris, France
- Genres: Lambada, worldbeat
- Years active: 1989–1999; 2006–2009
- Labels: Epic, Atoll
- Past members: Loalwa Braz; Chyco Dru; Jacky Arconte; Jean-Claude Bonaventure; Michel Abihssira; Fania; Etna Brasyl; Dyami; Alan Hoy
- Website: Kaoma Website

Kaoma was a French–Brazilian band. It was created in 1989 and responsible for successfully launching the lambada musical style in Europe. In a 10-year period from 1989 until the band's disbandment in 1999, Kaoma released three albums, and the band's biggest success was the 1989 song "Lambada", which topped the charts in many countries.

== Background ==
In 1988, two French producers called Jean Georgakarakos, known as Jean Karakos, and Olivier Lamotte D'Incamps, known as Olivier Lorsac, visited Brazil, and while they were on vacation in the northeastern city of Porto Seguro, they discovered the Lambada genre and Márcia Ferreira's song "Chorando Se Foi" playing on a local radio station.

The French duo then got the idea of forming a lambada group to introduce the genre to Europe, and after returning to France, they registered the song at SACEM under the name Chico de Oliveira and renamed the song to Lambada.

The two French producers were originally looking for a singer between 19 and 25 years old for a lambada group. Despite already being in her 30s, Loalwa Braz, who had been living in France since 1985, decided to enter the contest. Not only was Braz selected among more than 20 candidates, but also gave the idea of naming the band Kaoma. The other musicians hired for the project were Chyco Dru from Martinique for the bass, Jacky Arconte from Guadeloupe for the guitar, Jean-Claude Bonaventure on the keyboard, Michel Abihssira for the drums and percussion, and Fania Niang for backing vocals.

== Career ==
In the summer of 1989, the band Kaoma released the single "Lambada", which became a major chart-topping international hit. The songwriting credits were given to Chico de Oliveira. However, it was discovered on 30 August 1989 that Chico de Oliveira was a pseudonym for Olivier Lamotte D'Incamps, better known as Olivier Lorsac.

Instead, it was a direct cover of the 1986 song "Chorando Se Foi" by Brazilian singer-songwriter Márcia Ferreira, which itself was a Portuguese adaptation of Cuarteto Continental's 1984 version of "Llorando se fue", whose original version was released in 1981 by Bolivian group Los Kjarkas. To add more to the story, Kaoma also significantly altered Márcia Ferreira's lyrics. This led to both Los Kjarkas and Márcia Ferreira successfully suing Kaoma, the former in 1990 and the latter in 1991.

"Dançando Lambada" and "Mélodie d'amour" were the next two singles and were also hits, although they failed to earn the same success as "Lambada", which itself peaked at number 46 in the US Billboard Hot 100. "Lambada" fared better in Europe, reaching number 4 in the UK Singles Chart. Also in 1989, Kaoma released their first album Worldbeat which achieved worldwide success, becoming - along with Beto Barbosa - one of the legends of Brazilian lambada. At the 1990 Lo Nuestro Awards, Kaoma won two awards for Pop Group of the Year and New Pop Artist of the Year.

In 1991, Kaoma released the album Tribal Pursuit which provided the singles "Dança Tago Mago" and "Moço do Dendê". Kaoma would also release the album A la media noche in 1998, prior to disbanding, and Braz would continue on a solo career.

=== Murder of Loalwa Braz ===
On 19 January 2017, Braz was murdered in Saquarema, and her body was found in her car in a carbonized state. Police arrested three suspects for the murder; several motives were suspected, such as a botched robbery or a revenge killing. All three were sentenced to prison.

== Personnel ==
=== Principal members ===
- Loalwa Braz – lead vocals (1989–1999; died 2017)
- Chyco Dru – bass guitar (1989–1999; 2006–2009)
- Jacky Arconte – guitars (1989–1999; 2006–2009)
- Jean-Claude Bonaventure – keyboards, production (1989–1993)
- Michel Abihssira – drums, percussion (1989–1998)
- Fania – backing vocals, flute (1989–1993)

=== Other members ===
- Etna Brasyl – lead vocals (2006–2009)
- Dyami – unknown
- Alan Hoy – backing vocals, dancer (2006–2009)

== Discography ==
=== Albums ===
List of studio albums, with selected chart positions, sales figures and certifications
Title	Album details	Peak chart positions										Certifications
Title	Album details	BRA	AUS	AUT	GER	NLD	NOR	SWE	SWI	US	US Latin	Certifications
Worldbeat	Released: 16 December 1989; Label: Columbia; Formats: CD	1	17	16	21	12	11	41	6	40	1	ABPD: Platinum; MC: Gold
Tribal-Pursuit	Released: 1991; Label: Sony Music; Formats: CD	—	—	—	—	51	—	—	—	—	—	
A La Media Noche	Released: 10 November 1998; Label: Atoll Music; Formats: CD	—	—	—	—	—	—	—	—	—	—	

=== Singles ===
List of singles, with selected chart positions and certifications
Title	Year	Peak chart positions										Certifications	Album
Title	Year	AUS	AUT	CAN	GER	IRL	NLD	NZ	SWI	UK	US	Certifications	Album
"Lambada"	1989	5	1	78	1	4	1	10	1	4	46	ARIA: Gold; BPI: Gold; BVMI: 2× Platinum; IFPI SWE: Platinum; IFPI SWI: Gold; MC: Gold; NVPI: Platinum; RIAJ: Platinum	Worldbeat
"Dançando Lambada"	1989	—	17	—	18	11	5	—	6	62	—		Worldbeat
"Lambamor"	1990	—	—	—	—	—	—	—	—	—	—		Worldbeat
"Mélodie d'amour"	1990	—	—	—	—	—	15	—	—	—	—		Worldbeat
"Jambé Finète (Grillé)" (Remix)	1990	—	—	—	—	—	—	—	—	—	—		Worldbeat
"Dança Tago-Mago"	1991	—	—	—	—	—	8	—	—	—	—		Tribal Pursuit
"Mamãe Afrika"	1991	—	—	—	—	—	—	—	—	—	—		Tribal Pursuit
"Moço do Dende"	1992	—	—	—	—	—	—	—	—	—	—		Tribal Pursuit
"A la Media Noche" (Remix)	1998	—	—	—	—	—	—	—	—	—	—		A La Media Noche
"Banto"	1999	—	—	—	—	—	—	—	—	—	—		A La Media Noche
"Lambada 3000"	2009	—	—	—	—	—	18	—	—	—	—		Non-album single
"Danca Tago Mago (Robert Abigail Remix) feat. Fab Faya"	2014	—	—	—	—	—	—	—	—	—	—		Non-album single
