= Acobamba District, Tarma =

Coordinates: 11.3530°S 75.6603°W

Acobamba Aqupampa
- District
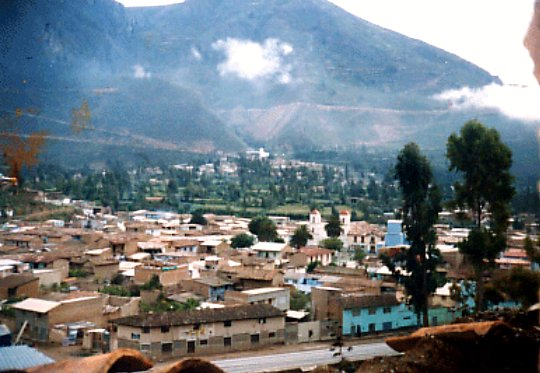
- Acobamba

- Coat of arms
- Interactive map of Acobamba; Aqupampa
- Country: Peru
- Region: Junín
- Province: Tarma
- Founded: January 2, 1857
- Capital: Acobamba
- Subdivisions: 4 populated centers

Government
  - Mayor: Francisco Vicuña

Area
  - Total: 97.84 km^{2} (37.78 sq mi)
- Elevation: 2,940 m (9,650 ft)

Population (2017)
  - Total: 9,500
  - Density: 97/km^{2} (250/sq mi)
- Time zone: UTC-5 (PET)
- Website: muniacobamba.gob.pe

Acobamba or Aqupampa (Quechua aqu sand, pampa large plain, "sand plain") is a district in the middle of Tarma Province in Peru. It is bordered by districts of Tarma, La Unión and Palcamayo on the west, Huasahuasi District on the north, districts of Palca and Tapo on the east, and districts of Tapo and Tarma on the south.

== See also ==
- Rumi Pukyu
- Wayunkayuq
- Yana Urqu
