= Suwa Mach'ay =

Mountain in Peru

- Location within Peru

Highest point
- Elevation: 4,400 m (14,400 ft)
- Coordinates: 11°13′41″S 75°45′00″W

Geography
- Location: Peru, Junín Region

Suwa Mach'ay (Quechua suwa thief, mach'ay cave, "thief's cave", also spelled Suamachay) is a mountain in the Andes of Peru which reaches a height of approximately 4,400 m (14,400 ft). It lies in the Junín Region, Tarma Province, on the border of the districts of Huasahuasi and Palcamayo. Suwa Mach'ay lies southeast of a lake name Mamanqucha.
