= Waskhaqucha =

Waskhaqucha (Quechua for "rope lake") or Wask'aqucha (Quechua for "rectangle lake") may refer to:

- Wask'aqucha (Apurímac), a lake in the Apurímac Region, Peru
- Waskhaqucha (Cajas), a lake in the Cajas District, Tarma Province, Junín Region, Peru
- Waskhaqucha (Carhuacayan), a lake in the Carhuacayan District, Yauli Province, Junín Region, Peru
- Waskhaqucha (Huánuco), a lake in the Huánuco Region, Peru
- Waskhaqucha (Huasahuasi, Huacuas), a lake near Huacuas in the Huasahuasi District, Tarma Province, Junín Region, Peru
- Waskhaqucha (Huasahuasi, San Antonio), a lake near San Antonio in the Huasahuasi District, Tarma Province, Junín Region, Peru
- Wask'aqucha (Lima), a lake in the Lima Region, Peru
- Waskhaqucha (Morococha), a lake in the Morococha District, Yauli Province, Junín Region, Peru
