= Qanchisqucha =

Qanchisqucha (Quechua qanchis seven, qucha lake, "seven lakes", Hispanicized spellings Canchiscocha, Janchiscocha) may refer to:

- Qanchisqucha (Huasahuasi), a lake in the Huasahuasi District, Tarma Province, Junín Region, Peru
- Qanchisqucha (Mariscal Luzuriaga), a lake in the Mariscal Luzuriaga Province, Ancash Region, Peru
- Qanchisqucha (San Pedro de Cajas), a lake in the San Pedro de Cajas District, Tarma Province, Junín Region, Peru
- Qanchisqucha (Yungay), a lake in the Yungay Province, Ancash Region, Peru
