= San Luis, Peru =

San Luis in Peru may refer to:

- San Luis, Ancash, capital of Carlos Fermín Fitzcarrald Province in the Ancash Region
- San Luis District, Carlos Fermín Fitzcarrald, a district in the Ancash Region
- San Luis District, Lima, a district in Lima
- San Luis District, Cañete, San Luis District in Cañete Province in the Lima Region
