= Yauya District =

Coordinates: 8°58′59″S 77°18′00″W

Yauya Yawya
- District
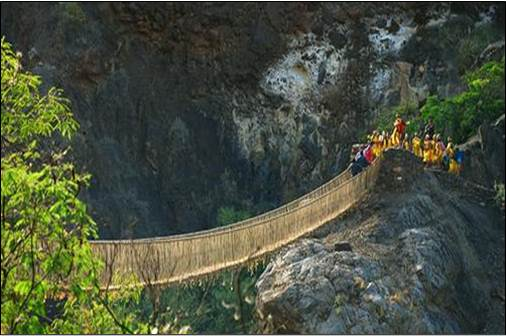
- Suspension bridge of Pukayaku (Pucayacu) across the river Yanamayu which connects the districts Llama and Yauya
- Interactive map of Yauya
- Country: Peru
- Region: Ancash
- Province: Carlos Fermín Fitzcarrald
- Founded: November 18, 1905
- Capital: Yauya

Government
  - Mayor: Antonio Sulpicio Villanueva Castillejo

Area
  - Total: 170.41 km^{2} (65.80 sq mi)
- Elevation: 3,250 m (10,660 ft)

Population (2005 census)
  - Total: 5,460
  - Density: 32.0/km^{2} (83.0/sq mi)
- Time zone: UTC-5 (PET)
- UBIGEO: 020703

Yauya District is one of three districts of the province Carlos Fermín Fitzcarrald in Peru.

== Ethnic groups ==
The people in the district are mainly indigenous citizens of Quechua descent. Quechua is the language which the majority of the population (92.69%) learnt to speak in childhood, 6.72% of the residents started speaking using the Spanish language (2007 Peru Census).

== See also ==
- Maray Qalla
- Yanamayu
