= Piscobamba (disambiguation) =

Piscobamba may refer to places in Peru:

- Piscobamba, a town, capital of the Mariscal Luzuriaga province
- Piscobamba District, a district of the Mariscal Luzuriaga province
