= Tarma province =

Coordinates: 11.418611°S 75.690833°W

Tarma
- Province
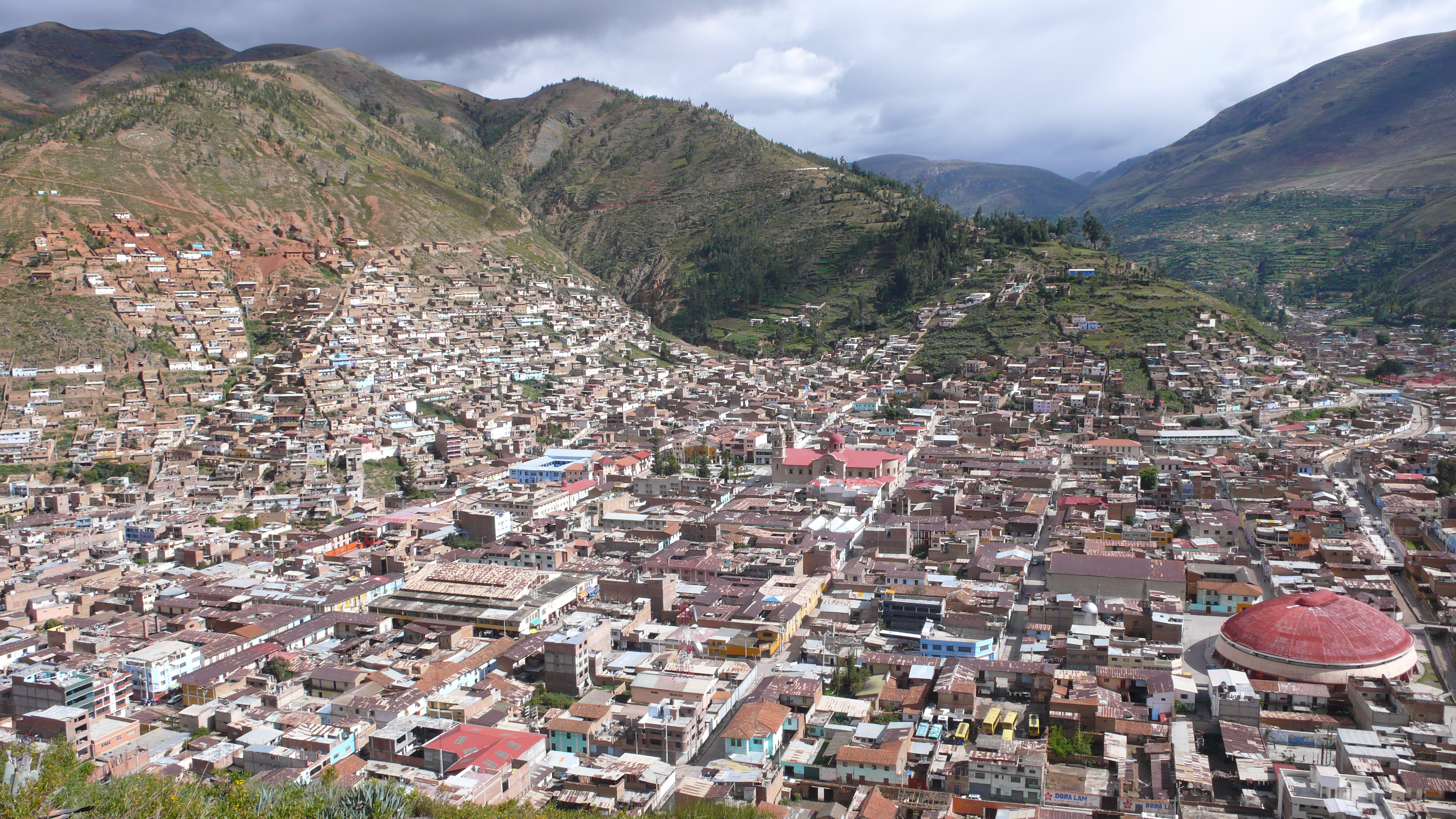

- Flag Coat of arms

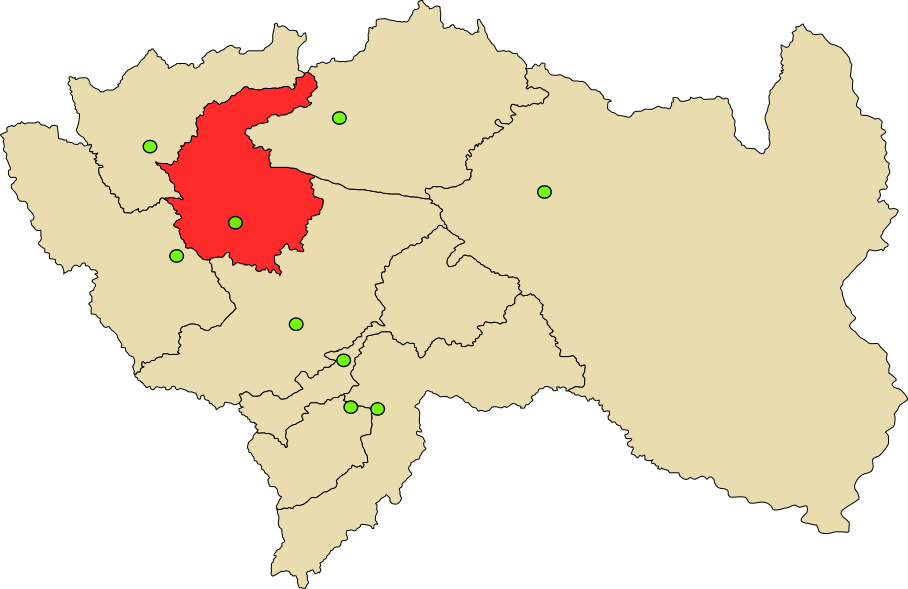
- Location of Tarma in the Junín Region
- Country: Peru
- Region: Junín
- Capital: Tarma

Government
  - Mayor: Fathy Jiménez

Area
  - Total: 2,749.16 km^{2} (1,061.46 sq mi)
- Elevation: 3,053 m (10,016 ft)

Population
  - Total: 89,590
  - Density: 32.59/km^{2} (84.40/sq mi)
- UBIGEO: 1207
- Website: www.munitarma.gob.pe

Tarma is a Peruvian province, making up one of the nine provinces that conform the Junín Region. To the north it borders with the province of Junín, to the east with the province of Chanchamayo, to the south with the province of Jauja and to the west with the province of Yauli.

The region has an area of 2,749.16 square kilometers (1,061.46 sq mi), which represents the 6.2% of the departmental territory. It is located in a position privileged, touristy and economic, halfway between the capital and the high forest, and point of convergence of various routes towards the central forest. The climate is temperate and mild during most of months predominates.

== Geography ==
Some of the highest mountains in the province are listed below:

- Altu Wayway
- Anta Waru
- Antamarka
- Ayra Qaqa
- Hatun Pata
- Hatun Raqra
- Hirkan Kancha
- Kunkan
- Kuntur Pata
- Kuntur Punta
- Kuntur Qallachayuq
- Kuntur Sinqa
- Kuntur Wachana
- Kuntur Wayin
- Kunturniyuq
- Laksa Kancha
- Llama Pintashqa
- Machaq Punta
- Mataqucha
- Misapata
- Ñawpa Chaka
- Pata Kancha
- Pirwa Pirwa
- Pukaqucha
- Pukara
- Pukara Punta
- Putaqa Wayi
- P'unchawmarka
- Qallachayuq
- Qanchis Qucha
- Quchapata
- Qullqi Hirka
- Rasu Wallqan
- Rinrin Kancha
- Rumi Pukyu
- Ruru Kancha Punta
- Sarawisa
- Suraqniyuq
- Tanka Chuku
- Tawrishniyuq
- Tinya Warkhu
- Uchku Mach'ay
- Ukru Kancha
- Urqu Kancha
- Wallqa Yaku
- Wamanpinta
- Wank'a Rumi
- Wank'a Wank'a
- Waraqayuq
- Warmi Sinqa
- Wathiyaqucha
- Wayta Pallana
- Wayunkayuq
- Wisk'acha Kasha
- Yana Sinqa
- Yana Urqu
- Yuraq Allpa
- Yuraq Kancha
- Yuraq Marka

== Districts ==
The province is divided into nine districts.

- Acobamba (Acobamba)
- Huaricolca (Huaricolca)
- Huasahuasi (Huasahuasi)
- La Unión (Leticia)
- Palca (Palca)
- Palcamayo (Palcamayo)
- San Pedro de Cajas (San Pedro de Cajas)
- Tapo (Tapo)
- Tarma (Tarma)

== See also ==
- Pampa Hermosa Reserved Zone
- Qanchisqucha (San Pedro de Cajas)
- Qanchisqucha (Huasahuasi)
- Tarmatampu
- Waskaqucha (Cajas)
- Waskaqucha (Huasahuasi, Huacuas)
- Waskaqucha (Huasahuasi, San Antonio)
