= Sisurcana olivobrunnea =

Scientific classification
- Kingdom: Animalia
- Phylum: Arthropoda
- Clade: Pancrustacea
- Class: Insecta
- Order: Lepidoptera
- Family: Tortricidae
- Genus: Sisurcana
- Species: S. olivobrunnea

Binomial name
- Sisurcana olivobrunnea Razowski & Wojtusiak, 2010

Species of moth

Sisurcana olivobrunnea is a species of moth of the family Tortricidae. Formally described in 2010, it is named after its coloration. The only known specimen of this moth had a wingspan of 21 mm (0.83 in). It has an olive-gray forewing and brown-gray hindwing. It is a Peruvian endemic, being known only from its type locality of the Pampa Hermosa National Sanctuary, where it was collected at an elevation of 1,330 m (4,360 ft).

== Taxonomy ==
Sisurcana olivobrunnea was formally described by the Polish entomologist Józef Razowski and the Polish entomologist Janusz Wojtusiak in 2010 based on a female collected from Pampa Hermosa National Sanctuary in Peru. Although the type locality was incorrectly recorded to be in the department of Pasco, the sanctuary is actually located in the department of Junín, a fact noted correctly elsewhere in the describing paper. The authors wrote that the specific epithet is derived from the Latin words meaning "olive-gray", referring to the moth's color, but this is also a typo for the specific epithet olivogrisea.

== Description ==
The only known specimen of this moth had a wingspan of 21 mm (0.83 in). Both the dorsal and ventral surfaces of the forewing are largely olive-gray with a basal gray-brown wash and maculated with grayish-brown. The wings are maculated dorsally with postbasal and median fascia, as well as a spot just anterior to the tip. The cilia of the forewing are colored grayish-brown. The dorsal and ventral surfaces of the hindwing are brown-gray with a creamy wash to the region near the base, creamy-gray cilia, and brownish-gray maculations. The thorax is olive-gray while the head is olive-cream in color.

== Distribution ==
Sisurcana olivobrunnea is a Peruvian endemic, being known only from its type locality of the Pampa Hermosa National Sanctuary in the department of Junín. It was collected at an elevation of 1,330 m (4,360 ft).
