= Urqunqucha (Mariscal Luzuriaga) =

Lake in the Ancash Region, Peru

- Location within Peru Location within South America
- Interactive map of Urqunqucha
- Location: Peru; Ancash Region
- Coordinates: 8°55′54″S 77°31′52″W
- Surface area: 0.127530 km^{2} (127,530 m^{2})
- Surface elevation: 4,260 m (13,980 ft)

Urqunqucha (Quechua urqu male; mountain, -n a suffix, qucha lake, "male's lake" or "lake of the mountain", also spelled Orconcocha) is a lake in the Cordillera Blanca in the Andes of Peru. It is situated at a height of 4,260 m (13,980 ft) comprising an area of 0.127530 km^{2} (127,530 m^{2}). Urqunqucha is located in the Ancash Region, Mariscal Luzuriaga Province, Lucma District, east of the peak of Pukarahu (Quechua for "red mountain").
