= Wiqruqucha (Mariscal Luzuriaga) =

Lake in the Ancash Region, Peru

- Location within Peru
- Location: Peru; Ancash Region
- Coordinates: 8°55′35″S 77°31′07″W
- Surface area: 0.208916 km^{2} (208,916 m^{2})
- Surface elevation: 3,960 m (12,990 ft)

Wiqruqucha (Quechua wiqru twisted, bent qucha lake, "bent lake", also spelled Huecrococha) is a lake in Peru located in the Ancash Region, Mariscal Luzuriaga Province, Lucma District. It is situated at a height of 3,960 m (12,990 ft) comprising an area of 0.208916 km^{2} (208,916 m^{2}). Wiqruqucha lies in the Cordillera Blanca, southeast of Tawllirahu and east of Pukarahu and a lake named Urqunqucha.
