= Llama District, Mariscal Luzuriaga =

Coordinates: 8°52′59″S 77°18′00″W

Llama
- District
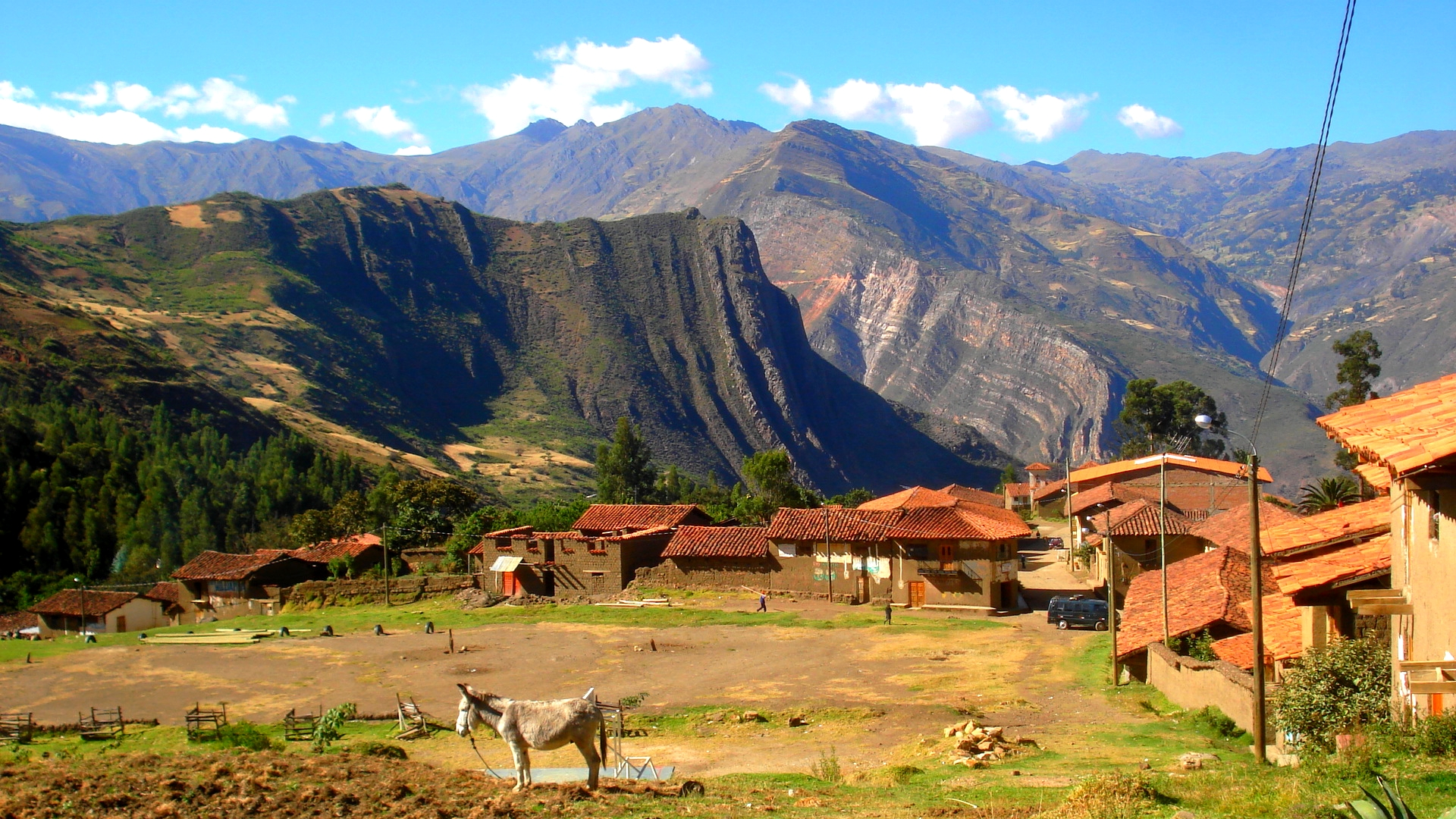
- Interactive map of Llama
- Country: Peru
- Region: Ancash
- Province: Mariscal Luzuriaga
- Founded: November 22, 1905
- Capital: Llama

Government
  - Mayor: Jorge Luis Vega Flores

Area
  - Total: 48.13 km^{2} (18.58 sq mi)
- Elevation: 2,821 m (9,255 ft)

Population (2005 census)
  - Total: 1,526
  - Density: 31.71/km^{2} (82.12/sq mi)
- Time zone: UTC-5 (PET)
- UBIGEO: 021305

Llama District is one of eight districts of the Mariscal Luzuriaga Province in Peru.

== Ethnic groups ==
The people in the district are mainly indigenous citizens of Quechua descent. Quechua is the language which the majority of the population (88.16%) learnt to speak in childhood, 10.85% of the residents started speaking using the Spanish language (2007 Peru Census).

== See also ==
- Ancash Quechua

== See also ==
- Yanamayu
