= Urququcha =

Urququcha, Urqu Qucha, Urqunqucha, or Orconcocha may refer to any of the following lakes:

- Urqu Qucha (Bolivia), a lake in the Potosí Department, Bolivia
- Urqunqucha (Mariscal Luzuriaga), a lake in the Mariscal Luzuriaga Province, Ancash Region, Peru
- Urququcha (Apurímac), a lake in the Grau Province, Apurímac Region, Peru
- Urququcha (Arequipa), a lake in the Arequipa Province, Arequipa Region, Peru
- Lake Orconcocha, Ayacucho, a lake in the Lucanas Province, Ayacucho Region, Peru
- Urququcha (Cusco), a lake in the Chumbivilcas Province, Cusco Region, Peru
- Orcococha (Huancavelica), a lake in the Castrovirreyna Province, Huancavelica Region, Peru
- Orconcocha, one of the two Llankanuku Lakes in the Yungay Province, Ancash Region, Peru
