= Casca =

Casca or CASCA may refer to:

== Arts and entertainment ==
- Casca (Rome character), a character in the HBO television series
- Casca (series), a series of novels by Barry Sadler
- A character in the anime and manga series Berserk

== Places ==
- Casca, Rio Grande do Sul, Brazil, a municipality
- Casca District, Mariscal Luzuriaga, Peru
- Rio Casca, Minas Gerais, Brazil, a municipality

== Other uses ==
- 168358 Casca, a minor planet
- Canadian Astronomical Society
- Casca (grape), another name for the wine grape Mourvèdre
- Contemporary Art Centre of South Australia, now art of ACE Open, Adelaide, Australia
- Publius Servilius Casca, one of the assassins of Julius Caesar

== See also ==
- Da Casca River, Mato Grosso, Brazil
- Cascas, a town in La Libertad, Peru
