= TAPO =

TAPO or Tapo may refer to:

- Tapo District, in Peru
- Tapo language
- Tashkent Aviation Production Association a high-tech company in Uzbekistan
- Terminal de Autobuses de Pasajeros de Oriente a bus station in Mexico City
- Tapo, a Chinese brand of computer networking and smart home products
