= Sisurcana margaritae =

Scientific classification
- Kingdom: Animalia
- Phylum: Arthropoda
- Class: Insecta
- Order: Lepidoptera
- Family: Tortricidae
- Genus: Sisurcana
- Species: S. margaritae

Binomial name
- Sisurcana margaritae Razowski & Pelz, 2004

Species of moth

Sisurcana margaritae is a species of moth of the family Tortricidae. It is known from Morona-Santiago Province, Ecuador. It is named for Margarita Pelz.

The wing span is 17 mm (0.67 in).
