= Huachucocha (Ancash) =

Mountain in Peru

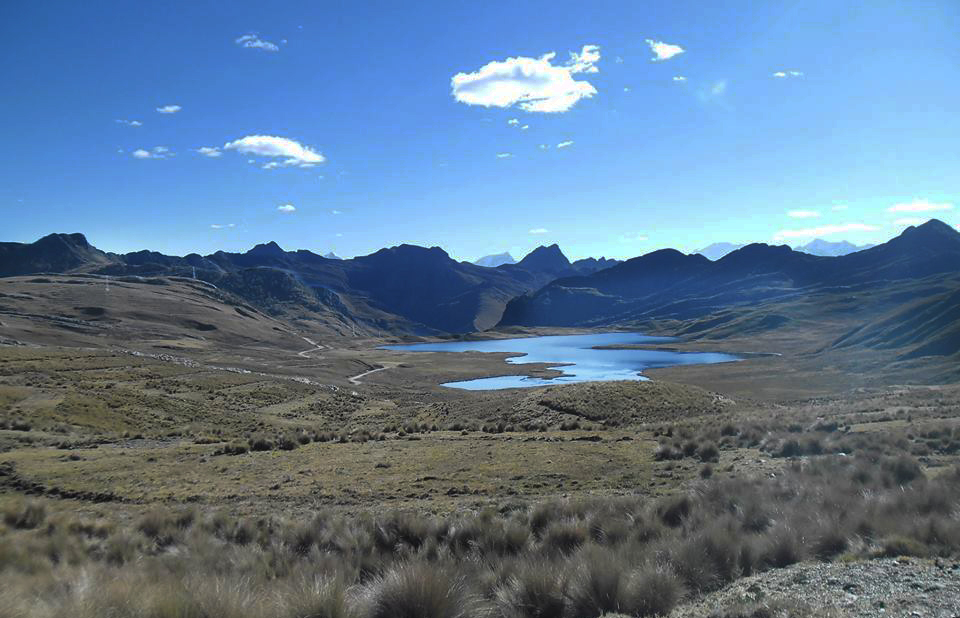
- Huachucocha as seen from the east

- Location within Peru
- Location: Peru, Ancash Region
- Coordinates: 9°10′03″S 77°14′07″W
- Basin countries: Peru

Huachucocha or Huachococha (possibly from Quechua wachu furrow slice, ridge turned up by the plough between two furrows / row, qucha lake) is a lake in Peru east of the Cordillera Blanca at a mountain of the same name. It is situated in the Ancash Region, Carlos Fermín Fitzcarrald Province, San Luis District.

The mountain named Huachucocha lies north of the lake at 9°09′41″S 77°13′58″W. It reaches a height of about 4,400 m (14,436 ft) above sea level.

== See also ==
- Yanamayo
