= Sisurcana sangayana =

Scientific classification
- Domain: Eukaryota
- Kingdom: Animalia
- Phylum: Arthropoda
- Class: Insecta
- Order: Lepidoptera
- Family: Tortricidae
- Genus: Sisurcana
- Species: S. sangayana

Binomial name
- Sisurcana sangayana Razowski & Wojtusiak, 2009

Species of moth

Sisurcana sangayana is a species of moth of the family Tortricidae. It is found in Morona-Santiago Province, Ecuador.

The wingspan is about 28 mm.

== Etymology ==
The species name refers to the type locality, Sangay an active stratovolcano.
