= Sisurcana brasiliana =

Scientific classification
- Domain: Eukaryota
- Kingdom: Animalia
- Phylum: Arthropoda
- Class: Insecta
- Order: Lepidoptera
- Family: Tortricidae
- Genus: Sisurcana
- Species: S. brasiliana

Binomial name
- Sisurcana brasiliana Razowski, 2004

Species of moth

Sisurcana brasiliana is a species of moth of the family Tortricidae. It is found in Brazil (Santa Catarina, Paraná).

The wingspan is 18–22 mm.
