= Uchku Mach'ay =

Mountain in Peru

- Location within Peru

Highest point
- Elevation: 4,000 m (13,000 ft)
- Coordinates: 11°25′18″S 75°48′10″W

Geography
- Location: Peru, Junín Region

Uchku Mach'ay (Quechua uchku hole, mach'ay cave, "hole cave", also spelled Uchcomachay) is a mountain in the Andes of Peru which reaches a height of approximately 4,000 m (13,000 ft). It lies in the Junín Region, Tarma Province, Tarma District.
