= Sisurcana itatiaiae =

Scientific classification
- Kingdom: Animalia
- Phylum: Arthropoda
- Clade: Pancrustacea
- Class: Insecta
- Order: Lepidoptera
- Family: Tortricidae
- Genus: Sisurcana
- Species: S. itatiaiae

Binomial name
- Sisurcana itatiaiae Razowski & Becker, 2011

Species of moth

Sisurcana itatiaiae is a species of moth of the family Tortricidae. It is found in Rio de Janeiro, Brazil.

The wingspan is about 22 mm.

== Etymology ==
The species name refers to the type locality, Itatiaia, Brazil.
