= Sisurcana furcatana =

Scientific classification
- Kingdom: Animalia
- Phylum: Arthropoda
- Clade: Pancrustacea
- Class: Insecta
- Order: Lepidoptera
- Family: Tortricidae
- Genus: Sisurcana
- Species: S. furcatana

Binomial name
- Sisurcana furcatana Powell, 1986

Species of moth

Sisurcana furcatana is a species of moth of the family Tortricidae. It is found in Venezuela.
