= Sisurcana vilcanotae =

Scientific classification
- Kingdom: Animalia
- Phylum: Arthropoda
- Class: Insecta
- Order: Lepidoptera
- Family: Tortricidae
- Genus: Sisurcana
- Species: S. vilcanotae

Binomial name
- Sisurcana vilcanotae Razowski & Wojtusiak, 2010

Species of moth

Sisurcana vilcanotae is a species of moth of the family Tortricidae. It is found in Cordillera Vilcanota, Peru.

The wingspan is about 31 mm in males.

== Etymology ==
The specific name refers to the Cordillera Vilcanota, the type locality.
