= Sisurcana topina =

Scientific classification
- Kingdom: Animalia
- Phylum: Arthropoda
- Class: Insecta
- Order: Lepidoptera
- Family: Tortricidae
- Genus: Sisurcana
- Species: S. topina

Binomial name
- Sisurcana topina Razowski & Pelz, 2004

Species of moth

Sisurcana topina is a species of moth of the family Tortricidae. It is found in Ecuador in the provinces of Morona-Santiago, Tungurahua, and Napo and in Peru.

The wing span is 19 mm (0.75 in).
