= Tinya Warkhu =

Mountain in Peru

- Location within Peru

Highest point
- Elevation: 4,400 m (14,400 ft)
- Coordinates: 11°12′38″S 75°51′33″W

Geography
- Location: Peru, Junín Region

Tinya Warkhu (Quechua tinya a kind of drum, warkhu hanging, also spelled Tinyahuarco) is a mountain in the Andes of Peru which reaches a height of approximately 4,400 m (14,400 ft). It lies in the Junín Region, Tarma Province, Cajas District. Tinya Warkhu is also the name of the village west of the mountain.
