= San Nicolás District, Carlos Fermín Fitzcarrald =

Coordinates: 8°51′00″S 77°07′59″W

San Nicolás District
- District
- Interactive map of San Nicolás District
- Country: Peru
- Region: Ancash
- Province: Carlos Fermín Fitzcarrald
- Founded: June 6, 1983
- Capital: San Nicolás

Government
  - Mayor: Damasco Lidio Olortegui Romero

Area
  - Total: 197.39 km^{2} (76.21 sq mi)
- Elevation: 2,875 m (9,432 ft)

Population (2005 census)
  - Total: 3,762
  - Density: 19.06/km^{2} (49.36/sq mi)
- Time zone: UTC-5 (PET)
- UBIGEO: 020702

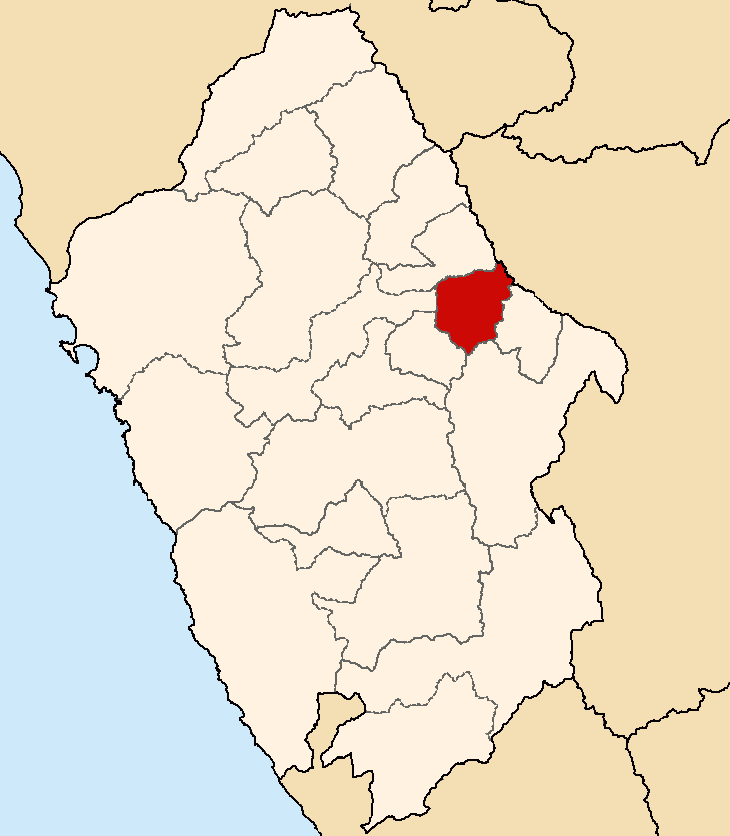
Location of the province Carlos Fermin Fitzcarrald in the Ancash region in Peru

San Nicolás District is one of three districts of the province Carlos Fermín Fitzcarrald in Peru.

== Ethnic groups ==
The people in the district are mainly indigenous citizens of Quechua descent. Quechua is the language which the majority of the population (95.03%) learnt to speak in childhood, 4.36% of the residents started speaking using the Spanish language (2007 Peru Census).

== See also ==
- Yanamayu
