= Carlos Fermín Fitzcarrald province =

Coordinates: 9°04′59″S 77°21′00″W

Carlos Fermín Fitzcarrald
- Province
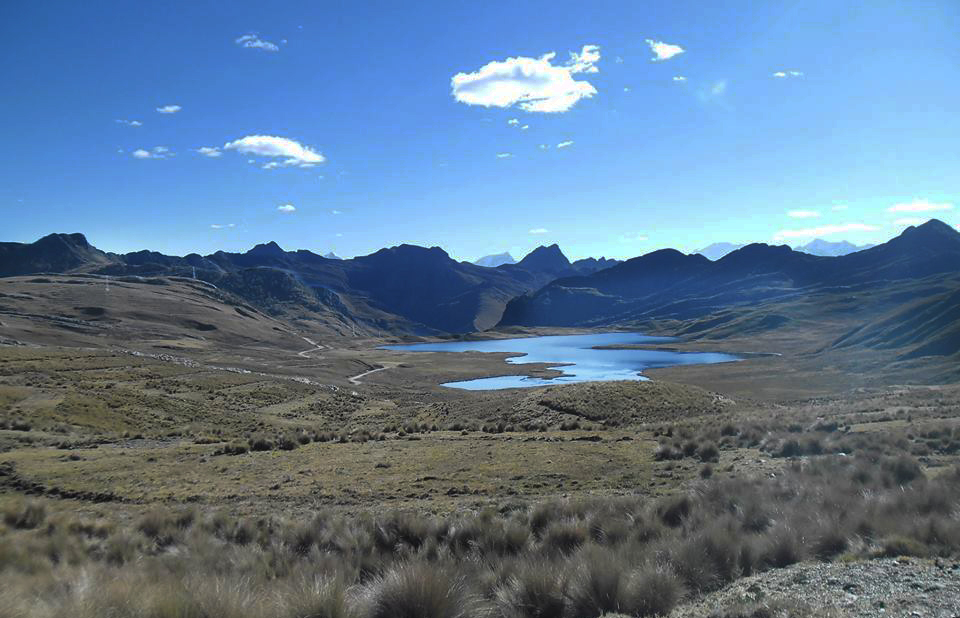
- Wachuqucha

- Flag Coat of arms

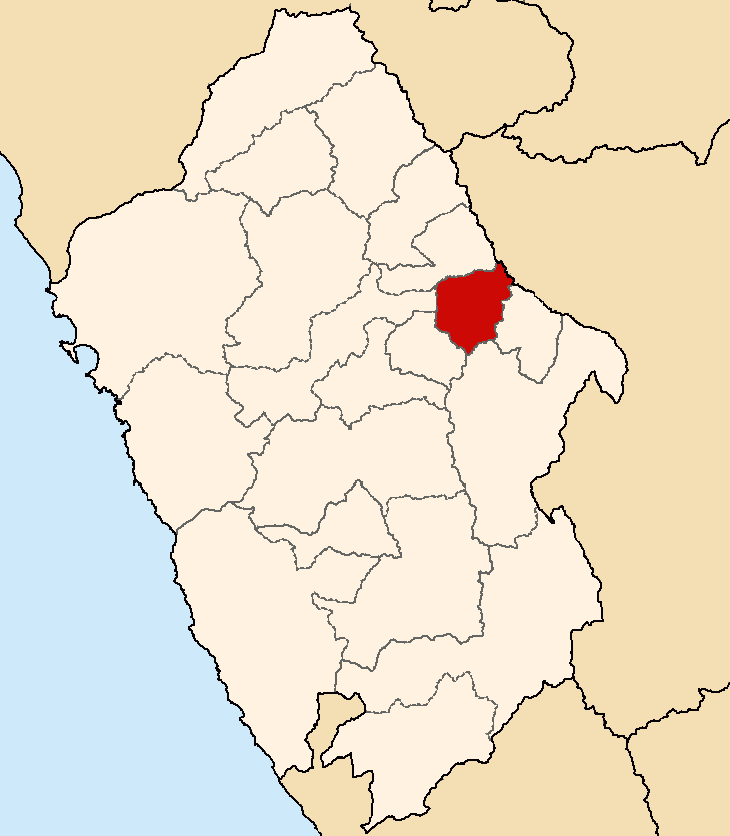
- Location of Carlos Fermín Fitzcarrald in the Ancash Region
- Country: Peru
- Region: Ancash
- Capital: San Luis

Government
  - Mayor: Wilder Carlos Fitzcarrald Bravo (2007)

Area
  - Total: 624 km^{2} (241 sq mi)

Population
  - Total: 17,717
  - Density: 28.4/km^{2} (73.5/sq mi)

Carlos Fermín Fitzcarrald is one of the 20 provinces of the Ancash Region of Peru. It is named after Carlos Fermín Fitzcarrald, the rubber tycoon whose life served as an inspiration behind the 1982 film Fitzcarraldo.

== Geography ==
One of the highest peaks of the province is Atuq Yakunan at approximately 4,200 m (13,800 ft). Other mountains are listed below:

- Atuq Wachanqa
- Chinchu Hirka
- Hatun Kinwa
- Hatun Urqun
- Ichik Kinwa
- Kuntur Sinqa
- Khuchi Wachanan
- Pallqu
- Phiruru Kancha
- Qalla Qalla
- Wachu Qucha
- Waman
- Wayra
- Yana Mayu Hirka

The Yana Mayu ("black river") flows along the northern border of the province.

== Political division ==
Carlos Fermín Fitzcarrald is divided into 3 districts:

District	Mayor
San Luis	Wilder Carlos Fitzcarrald Bravo
San Nicolas	Damasco Lidio Olortegui Romero
Yauya	Antonio Sulpicio Villanueva Castillejo

== Ethnic groups ==
The people in the province are mainly indigenous citizens of Quechua descent. Quechua is the language which the majority of the population (90.87%) learnt to speak in childhood, 8.65% of the residents started speaking using the Spanish language (2007 Peru Census).

== See also ==
- Maray Qalla
- Wachuqucha
