= Sisurcana leptina =

Scientific classification
- Domain: Eukaryota
- Kingdom: Animalia
- Phylum: Arthropoda
- Class: Insecta
- Order: Lepidoptera
- Family: Tortricidae
- Genus: Sisurcana
- Species: S. leptina

Binomial name
- Sisurcana leptina Razowski, 2004

Species of moth

Sisurcana leptina is a species of moth of the family Tortricidae. It is found in Pichincha-Septimo Paraiso Reserve in Ecuador.

The wingspan is about 18.5 mm.
