= Sisurcana ruficilia =

Scientific classification
- Domain: Eukaryota
- Kingdom: Animalia
- Phylum: Arthropoda
- Class: Insecta
- Order: Lepidoptera
- Family: Tortricidae
- Genus: Sisurcana
- Species: S. ruficilia

Binomial name
- Sisurcana ruficilia Razowski & Wojtusiak, 2009

Species of moth

Sisurcana ruficilia is a species of moth of the family Tortricidae. It is found in Tungurahua Province, Ecuador.

The wingspan is about 30.5 mm.
