= Sisurcana clavus =

Scientific classification
- Kingdom: Animalia
- Phylum: Arthropoda
- Clade: Pancrustacea
- Class: Insecta
- Order: Lepidoptera
- Family: Tortricidae
- Genus: Sisurcana
- Species: S. clavus

Binomial name
- Sisurcana clavus Razowski & Wojtusiak, 2010

Species of moth

Sisurcana clavus is a species of moth of the family Tortricidae. Formally described in 2010, it is named after its coloration. The only known specimen of this moth had a wingspan of 23 mm (0.91 in). It has an cream-colored forewing and brown-gray hindwing. It is a Peruvian endemic, being known only from its type locality of the Cordillera Vilcanota mountain range in the department of Cusco, where it was collected at an elevation of 3,100 m (10,200 ft).

== Taxonomy ==
Sisurcana clavus was formally described by the Polish entomologist Józef Razowski and the Polish entomologist Janusz Wojtusiak in 2010 based on an adult male collected from the Cordillera Vilcanota mountain range in Peru. The specific epithet refers to the "termination of [the] sacculus" and is derived from the Latin word clavus, meaning "claw". It is a close relative of S. vilcanotae.

== Description ==
The only known specimen of this moth, an adult male, had a wingspan of 23 mm (0.91 in). Both the dorsal and ventral surfaces of the forewing are largely cream in color, with a basal gray-brown wash and maculated with grayish-brown. There are brown-hued areas that form a median fascia, while the rest of the markings on the forewing are generally small. The cilia of the forewing are the same color as the remainder of the forewing. The dorsal and ventral surfaces of the hindwing are brown-gray with a gray wash towards the rear and brownish-gray maculations. The cilia of the hindwing are the same color as the remainder of the hindwing. The thorax is cream-colored with brown maculations, while the head is simply cream.

== Distribution and habitat ==
Sisurcana clavus is a Peruvian endemic, being known only from its type locality of the Cordillera Vilcanota mountain range in the department of Cusco. It was collected at an elevation of 3,100 m (10,200 ft).
