= Sisurcana batalloana =

Scientific classification
- Domain: Eukaryota
- Kingdom: Animalia
- Phylum: Arthropoda
- Class: Insecta
- Order: Lepidoptera
- Family: Tortricidae
- Genus: Sisurcana
- Species: S. batalloana

Binomial name
- Sisurcana batalloana Razowski & Wojtusiak, 2006

Species of moth

Sisurcana batalloana is a species of moth of the family Tortricidae. It is found in Venezuela.

The wingspan is about 29 mm.
