= Sisurcana latiloba =

Scientific classification
- Kingdom: Animalia
- Phylum: Arthropoda
- Clade: Pancrustacea
- Class: Insecta
- Order: Lepidoptera
- Family: Tortricidae
- Genus: Sisurcana
- Species: S. latiloba

Binomial name
- Sisurcana latiloba Razowski & Wojtusiak, 2010

Species of moth

Sisurcana latiloba is a species of moth of the family Tortricidae Formally described in 2010, it is named after the form of the transtilla. The only known specimen of this moth had a wingspan of 23 mm (0.91 in). It has largely ferruginous forewings and hindwings. It is a Peruvian endemic, being known only from its type locality of the Yanachaga–Chemillén National Park in the department of Pasco, where it was collected at an elevation of 2,400 m (7,900 ft).

== Taxonomy ==
Sisurcana latiloba was formally described by the Polish entomologist Józef Razowski and the Polish entomologist Janusz Wojtusiak in 2010 based on an adult male collected from the Yanachaga–Chemillén National Park in Peru. The specific epithet refers to "the shape of [its] transtilla" and is derived from the Latin words latus and lobus, meaning "broad-lobed". It resembles the species S. topina in its appearance.

== Description ==
The only known specimen of this moth, an adult male, had a wingspan of 20 mm (0.79 in). Both the dorsal and ventral surfaces of the forewing are largely ferruginous in color, with a gray hue towards the tip and maculated with rust-red patterns. There is a blotch near the base, a medial fascia that narrows along the costa, a long spot just proximal to the tip, and two brown spots medially. The cilia of the forewing are rusty-brown with a cream wash towards the tornus. The dorsal and ventral surfaces of the hindwing are light rust-red and have pale rust-gray speckling towards the rear. The cilia of the hindwing are the same color as the nearby portions of the hindwing. The thorax and the head are colored brown.

== Distribution and habitat ==
Sisurcana latiloba is a Peruvian endemic, being known only from its type locality of Yanachaga–Chemillén National Park in the department of Pasco. It was collected at an elevation of 2,400 m (7,900 ft).
