= Waskhaqucha (Huasahuasi, San Antonio) =

Lake in Junín Region, Peru

- Location within Peru
- Location: Peru; Junín Region
- Coordinates: 11°05′30″S 75°42′56″W
- Max. length: 1.28 km (0.80 mi)
- Max. width: 0.31 km (0.19 mi)
- Surface elevation: 4,138 m (13,576 ft)

Waskhaqucha (Quechua waskha (also waska) rope, qucha lake, hispanicized spelling Huascacocha) or Wask'aqucha (Quechua wask'a rectangle) is a lake in Peru located in the Junín Region, Tarma Province, Huasahuasi District. It is situated at a height of about 4,138 metres (13,576 ft), about 1.28 km long and 0.31 km at its widest point. Waskhaqucha lies east of the lake Chinchayqucha between the village Yaniq of the San Pedro de Cajas District in the north west and the small place San Antonio in the south-east.
