= Sisurcana valida =

Scientific classification
- Kingdom: Animalia
- Phylum: Arthropoda
- Clade: Pancrustacea
- Class: Insecta
- Order: Lepidoptera
- Family: Tortricidae
- Genus: Sisurcana
- Species: S. valida

Binomial name
- Sisurcana valida Razowski & Becker, 2011

Species of moth

Sisurcana valida is a species of moth of the family Tortricidae. It is found in Rio de Janeiro, Brazil.

The wingspan is about 22 mm.

== Etymology ==
The species name refers to the affirmation of its position and is derived from Latin validus (meaning valid).
