= Sisurcana tabloneana =

Scientific classification
- Domain: Eukaryota
- Kingdom: Animalia
- Phylum: Arthropoda
- Class: Insecta
- Order: Lepidoptera
- Family: Tortricidae
- Genus: Sisurcana
- Species: S. tabloneana

Binomial name
- Sisurcana tabloneana Razowski & Wojtusiak, 2009

Species of moth

Sisurcana tabloneana is a species of moth of the family Tortricidae. It is found in Tungurahua Province, Ecuador.

The wingspan is about 27 mm for males and 32 mm for females.

== Etymology ==
The species name refers to the type locality: El Tablon.
