= Huaricolca District =

Huaricolca Wariqullqa
- District
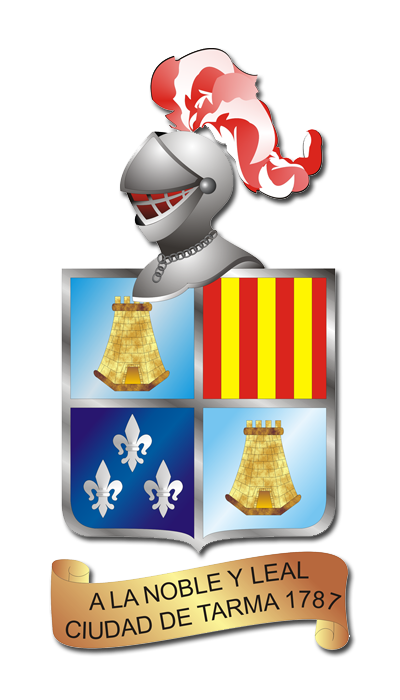
- Coat of arms
- Interactive map of Huaricolca
- Country: Peru
- Region: Junín
- Province: Tarma
- Founded: June 14, 1958
- Capital: Huaricolca

Government
  - Mayor: Yerson Ingaruca

Area
  - Total: 162.31 km^{2} (62.67 sq mi)
- Elevation: 3,796 m (12,454 ft)

Population (2005 census)
  - Total: 2,822
  - Density: 17.39/km^{2} (45.03/sq mi)
- Time zone: UTC-5 (PET)
- UBIGEO: 120703

Huaricolca District is one of nine districts of the province Tarma in Peru.
