= Eleazar Guzman Barron District =

Coordinates: 8.85266°S 77.35375°W

Eleazar Guzmán Barrón Pampachakra
- District
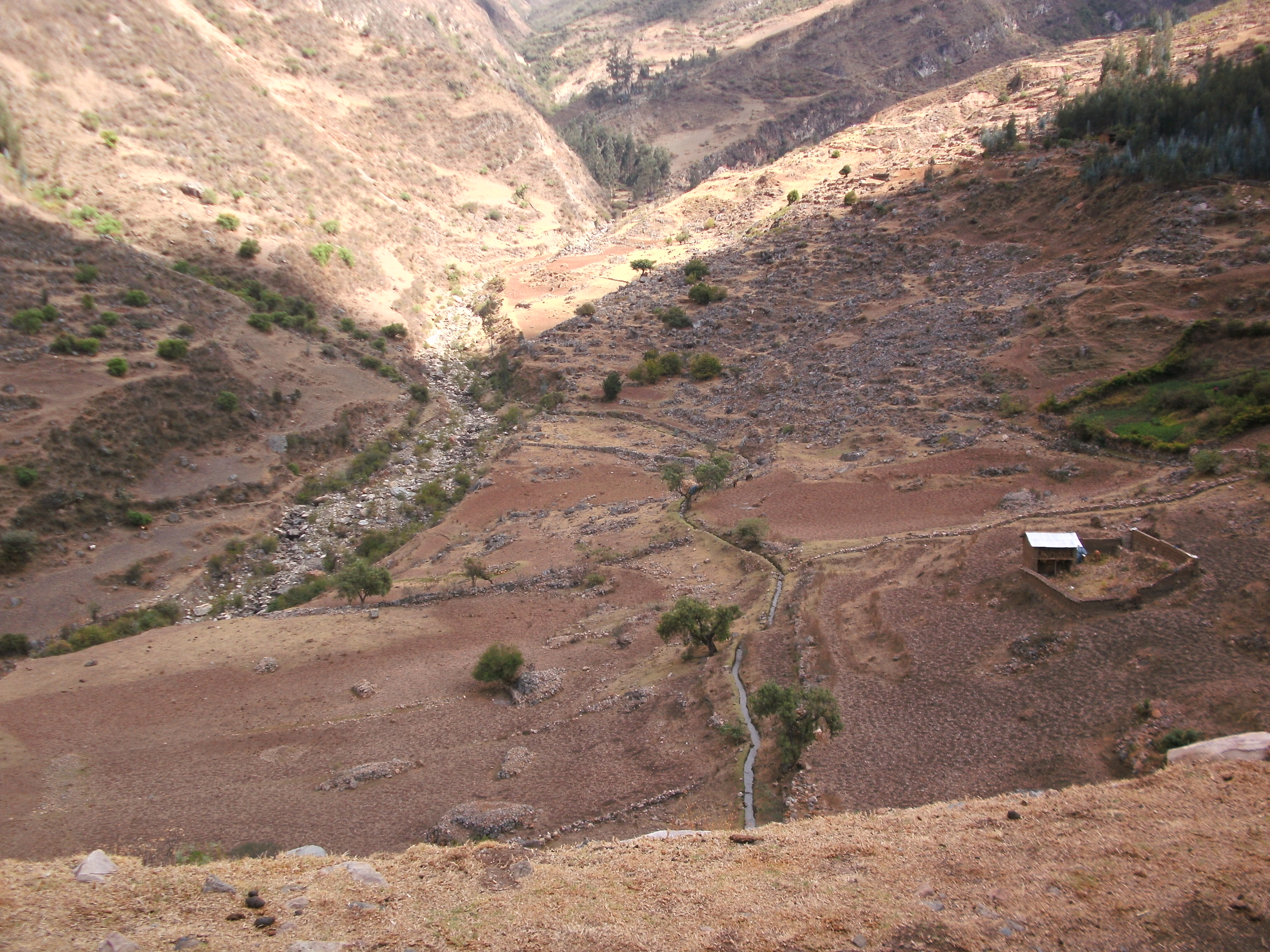
- The Pampachakra valley. Its stream flows to Yanamayu, a tributary of the Marañón River.
- Interactive map of Eleazar Guzmán Barrón
- Country: Peru
- Region: Ancash
- Province: Mariscal Luzuriaga
- Founded: December 13, 1985
- Capital: Pampachacra

Government
  - Mayor: José Moises Menacho Sotomayor

Area
  - Total: 93.96 km^{2} (36.28 sq mi)
- Elevation: 2,950 m (9,680 ft)

Population (2005 census)
  - Total: 1,222
  - Density: 13.01/km^{2} (33.68/sq mi)
- Time zone: UTC-5 (PET)
- UBIGEO: 021303

Eleazar Guzmán Barrón District is one of eight districts of the Mariscal Luzuriaga Province in Peru.

== Ethnic groups ==
The people in the district are mainly indigenous citizens of Quechua descent. Quechua is the language which the majority of the population (96.73%) learnt to speak in childhood, while 3.10% began with Spanish.

== See also ==
- Ancash Quechua

== See also ==
- Yanamayu
