= Sisurcana chromotarpa =

Scientific classification
- Kingdom: Animalia
- Phylum: Arthropoda
- Class: Insecta
- Order: Lepidoptera
- Family: Tortricidae
- Genus: Sisurcana
- Species: S. chromotarpa

Binomial name
- Sisurcana chromotarpa Razowski & Pelz, 2004

Species of moth

Sisurcana chromotarpa is a species of moth of the family Tortricidae. It is known from Morona-Santiago Province, Ecuador.

The wing span is 19 mm (0.75 in).
