= Sisurcana obscura =

Scientific classification
- Domain: Eukaryota
- Kingdom: Animalia
- Phylum: Arthropoda
- Class: Insecta
- Order: Lepidoptera
- Family: Tortricidae
- Genus: Sisurcana
- Species: S. obscura

Binomial name
- Sisurcana obscura Razowski & Wojtusiak, 2008

Species of moth

Sisurcana obscura is a species of moth of the family Tortricidae. It is found in Loja Province, Ecuador.

The wingspan is about 30 mm.
