= Sisurcana atricaput =

Scientific classification
- Kingdom: Animalia
- Phylum: Arthropoda
- Clade: Pancrustacea
- Class: Insecta
- Order: Lepidoptera
- Family: Tortricidae
- Genus: Sisurcana
- Species: S. atricaput

Binomial name
- Sisurcana atricaput Razowski & Becker, 2011

Species of moth

Sisurcana atricaput is a species of moth of the family Tortricidae. It is found in Paraná, Brazil.

The wingspan is about 16 mm.

== Etymology ==
The species name refers to the colouration of the head.
