= Fidel Olivas Escudero District =

Coordinates: 8.85266°S 77.35375°W

Fidel Olivas Escudero
- District
- Interactive map of Fidel Olivas Escudero
- Country: Peru
- Region: Ancash
- Province: Mariscal Luzuriaga
- Founded: May 5, 1960
- Capital: Sanachgan

Government
  - Mayor: Alex Edmundo Mancisidor Pasco

Area
  - Total: 204.82 km^{2} (79.08 sq mi)
- Elevation: 2,650 m (8,690 ft)

Population (2005 census)
  - Total: 2,242
  - Density: 10.95/km^{2} (28.35/sq mi)
- Time zone: UTC-5 (PET)
- UBIGEO: 021304

Fidel Olivas Escudero District is one of eight districts of the Mariscal Luzuriaga Province in Peru.

== History ==
The district is named after Bishop Fidel Olivas Escudero.

== Ethnic groups ==
The people in the district are mainly indigenous citizens of Quechua descent. Quechua is the language which the majority of the population (97.11%) learnt to speak in childhood, 2.61% of the residents started speaking using the Spanish language (2007 Peru Census).

== See also ==
- Ancash Quechua

== See also ==
- Qanchisqucha
