= Sisurcana rhora =

Scientific classification
- Kingdom: Animalia
- Phylum: Arthropoda
- Clade: Pancrustacea
- Class: Insecta
- Order: Lepidoptera
- Family: Tortricidae
- Genus: Sisurcana
- Species: S. rhora

Binomial name
- Sisurcana rhora Razowski & Becker, 2004

Species of moth

Sisurcana rhora is a species of moth of the family Tortricidae. It is found in Ecuador in the provinces of Loja and Morona-Santiago.
