= Sisurcana procidua =

Scientific classification
- Kingdom: Animalia
- Phylum: Arthropoda
- Class: Insecta
- Order: Lepidoptera
- Family: Tortricidae
- Genus: Sisurcana
- Species: S. procidua

Binomial name
- Sisurcana procidua Razowski & Pelz, 2004

Species of moth

Sisurcana procidua is a species of moth of the family Tortricidae. It is found in Ecuador (Morona-Santiago Province, Zamora-Chinchipe Province) and Peru at elevations of 1,700–2,460 m (5,580–8,070 ft) above sea level.

The wing span is 19–20 mm (0.75–0.79 in).
