= Sisurcana antisanae =

Scientific classification
- Kingdom: Animalia
- Phylum: Arthropoda
- Class: Insecta
- Order: Lepidoptera
- Family: Tortricidae
- Genus: Sisurcana
- Species: S. antisanae

Binomial name
- Sisurcana antisanae Razowski & Pelz, 2007

Species of moth

Sisurcana antisanae is a species of moth of the family Tortricidae. It is found in Napo Province, Ecuador.
