= Sisurcana cirrhochroma =

Scientific classification
- Domain: Eukaryota
- Kingdom: Animalia
- Phylum: Arthropoda
- Class: Insecta
- Order: Lepidoptera
- Family: Tortricidae
- Genus: Sisurcana
- Species: S. cirrhochroma

Binomial name
- Sisurcana cirrhochroma Razowski & Wojtusiak, 2010

Species of moth

Sisurcana cirrhochroma is a species of moth of the family Tortricidae. It is found in Napo Province, Ecuador.

The wingspan is about 28 mm.
