= Wayunkayuq (Junín) =

Mountain in Peru

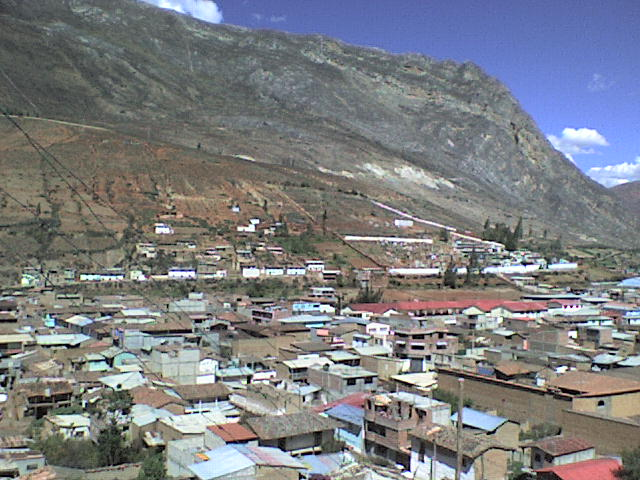

Highest point
- Elevation: 3,800 m (12,500 ft)
- Coordinates: 11°22′30″S 75°39′21″W

Geography
- Location within Peru
- Location: Peru, Junín Region

Wayunkayuq (Quechua wayunka a bunch of bananas, -yuq a suffix to indicate ownership, "the one with a bunch of bananas", also spelled Huayuncayoc) is a mountain in the Andes of Peru which reaches a height of approximately 3,800 m (12,500 ft). It is located in the Junín Region, Tarma Province, Acobamba District, south of Acobamba.
