= Sisurcana pallidobrunnea =

Scientific classification
- Domain: Eukaryota
- Kingdom: Animalia
- Phylum: Arthropoda
- Class: Insecta
- Order: Lepidoptera
- Family: Tortricidae
- Genus: Sisurcana
- Species: S. pallidobrunnea

Binomial name
- Sisurcana pallidobrunnea Razowski & Wojtusiak, 2006

Species of moth

Sisurcana pallidobrunnea is a species of moth of the family Tortricidae. It is found in Morona-Santiago Province, Ecuador.

The wingspan is about 28 mm.
