= Sisurcana ranunculata =

Scientific classification
- Domain: Eukaryota
- Kingdom: Animalia
- Phylum: Arthropoda
- Class: Insecta
- Order: Lepidoptera
- Family: Tortricidae
- Genus: Sisurcana
- Species: S. ranunculata

Binomial name
- Sisurcana ranunculata (Meyrick, 1912)

Synonyms
- Cnephasia ranunculata Meyrick, 1912

Species of moth

Sisurcana ranunculata is a species of moth of the family Tortricidae. It is found in Colombia and Ecuador (Carchi Province).
