= Sisurcana somatina =

Scientific classification
- Domain: Eukaryota
- Kingdom: Animalia
- Phylum: Arthropoda
- Class: Insecta
- Order: Lepidoptera
- Family: Tortricidae
- Genus: Sisurcana
- Species: S. somatina

Binomial name
- Sisurcana somatina (Dognin, 1912)

Synonyms
- Epagoge somatina Dognin, 1912

Species of moth

Sisurcana somatina is a species of moth of the family Tortricidae. It is found in Colombia and Ecuador (Cotopaxi Province).
