= Sisurcana gnosta =

Scientific classification
- Domain: Eukaryota
- Kingdom: Animalia
- Phylum: Arthropoda
- Class: Insecta
- Order: Lepidoptera
- Family: Tortricidae
- Genus: Sisurcana
- Species: S. gnosta

Binomial name
- Sisurcana gnosta Razowski & Wojtusiak, 2010

Species of moth

Sisurcana gnosta is a species of moth of the family Tortricidae. It is found in Colombia.

The wingspan is about 19 mm.
