= Sisurcana holographa =

Scientific classification
- Kingdom: Animalia
- Phylum: Arthropoda
- Class: Insecta
- Order: Lepidoptera
- Family: Tortricidae
- Genus: Sisurcana
- Species: S. holographa

Binomial name
- Sisurcana holographa Razowski & Pelz, 2004

Species of moth

Sisurcana holographa is a species of moth of the family Tortricidae. It is known from Morona-Santiago Province, Ecuador.

The wing span is 16 mm (0.63 in).
