= Qullqi Hirka =

Mountain in Peru

- Location within Peru

Highest point
- Elevation: 4,600 m (15,100 ft)
- Coordinates: 11°02′24″S 75°42′17″W

Geography
- Location: Peru, Junín Region

Qullqi Hirka (Quechua qullqi silver, hirka mountain, "silver mountain", also spelled Jolgigirca) is a mountain in the Andes of Peru which reaches a height of approximately 4,600 m (15,100 ft). It is located in the Junín Region, Tarma Province, Cajas District.
