= Sisurcana =

Scientific classification
- Kingdom: Animalia
- Phylum: Arthropoda
- Clade: Pancrustacea
- Class: Insecta
- Order: Lepidoptera
- Family: Tortricidae
- Subfamily: Tortricinae
- Genus: Sisurcana; Powell, 1986

Genus of tortrix moths

Sisurcana is a genus of moths belonging to the subfamily Tortricinae of the family Tortricidae.

== Species ==
- Sisurcana alticolana Razowski & Pelz, 2007
- Sisurcana aluminias (Meyrick, 1912)
- Sisurcana analogana Razowski & Pelz, 2007
- Sisurcana antisanae Razowski & Pelz, 2007
- Sisurcana atricaput Razowski & Becker, 2011
- Sisurcana atterimima Razowski & Pelz, 2004
- Sisurcana batalloana Razowski & Wojtusiak, 2006
- Sisurcana bifurcana Razowski & Pelz, 2007
- Sisurcana brasiliana Razowski, 2004
- Sisurcana chromotarpa Razowski & Pelz, 2004
- Sisurcana cirrhochroma Razowski & Wojtusiak, 2010
- Sisurcana citrochyta (Meyrick, 1926)
- Sisurcana clavus Razowski & Wojtusiak, 2010
- Sisurcana fasciana Razowski & Pelz, 2007
- Sisurcana firmuncus Razowski & Pelz, 2007
- Sisurcana furcatana Powell, 1986
- Sisurcana gnosta Razowski & Wojtusiak, 2011
- Sisurcana heredographa Razowski & Pelz, 2004
- Sisurcana holographa Razowski & Pelz, 2004
- Sisurcana itatiaiae Razowski & Becker, 2011
- Sisurcana latiloba Razowski & Wojtusiak, 2010
- Sisurcana leprana (Felder & Rogenhofer, 1875)
- Sisurcana leptina Razowski, 2004
- Sisurcana llaviucana Razowski & Pelz, 2007
- Sisurcana margaritae Razowski & Pelz, 2004
- Sisurcana microbaccata Razowski & Wojtusiak, 2009
- Sisurcana obscura Razowski & Wojtusiak, 2008
- Sisurcana olivobrunnea Razowski & Wojtusiak, 2010
- Sisurcana paenulata Razowski & Becker, 2004
- Sisurcana pallidobrunnea Razowski & Wojtusiak, 2006
- Sisurcana papallactana Razowski & Pelz, 2007
- Sisurcana pascoana Razowski & Wojtusiak, 2010
- Sisurcana polychondra Razowski & Becker, 2004
- Sisurcana procidua Razowski & Pelz, 2004
- Sisurcana pululahuana Razowski & Wojtusiak, 2009
- Sisurcana ranunculata (Meyrick, 1912)
- Sisurcana rhora Razowski & Becker, 2004
- Sisurcana ruficilia Razowski & Wojtusiak, 2009
- Sisurcana rufograpta Razowski & Wojtusiak, 2009
- Sisurcana sangayana Razowski & Wojtusiak, 2009
- Sisurcana sanguinoventer Razowski & Wojtusiak, 2010
- Sisurcana sectator Razowski & Becker, 2004
- Sisurcana somatina (Dognin, 1912)
- Sisurcana spinana Razowski & Pelz, 2007
- Sisurcana tabloneana Razowski & Wojtusiak, 2009
- Sisurcana temna Razowski & Becker, 2004
- Sisurcana topina Razowski & Pelz, 2004
- Sisurcana triangulifera Razowski & Pelz, 2007
- Sisurcana umbellifera (Meyrick, 1926)
- Sisurcana valida Razowski & Becker, 2011
- Sisurcana vilcanotae Razowski & Wojtusiak, 2010

== See also ==
- List of Tortricidae genera
