= Kuntur Wayin (Junín) =

Mountain in the Andes of Peru

- Location within Peru

Highest point
- Elevation: 4,400 m (14,400 ft)
- Coordinates: 11°28′18″S 75°51′17″W

Geography
- Location: Peru, Junín Region

Kuntur Wayin (Quechua kuntur condor, Ancash Quechua wayi house, "condor house", -n a suffix, also spelled Cóndorhuain) is a mountain in the Andes of Peru which reaches a height of approximately 4,400 m (14,400 ft). It lies in the Junín Region, Tarma Province, Tarma District.
