= Sisurcana rufograpta =

Scientific classification
- Domain: Eukaryota
- Kingdom: Animalia
- Phylum: Arthropoda
- Class: Insecta
- Order: Lepidoptera
- Family: Tortricidae
- Genus: Sisurcana
- Species: S. rufograpta

Binomial name
- Sisurcana rufograpta Razowski & Wojtusiak, 2009

Species of moth

Sisurcana rufograpta is a species of moth of the family Tortricidae. It is found in Ecuador in the provinces of Morona-Santiago and Tungurahua.
