= Hatun Raqra =

Mountain in Peru

- Location within Peru

Highest point
- Elevation: 4,200 m (13,800 ft)
- Coordinates: 11°03′36″S 75°46′32″W

Geography
- Location: Peru, Junín Region

Hatun Raqra (Quechua hatun big, raqra fissure, crack, crevice, "big crack (or crevice)", also spelled Jatun Racra) is a mountain in the Andes of Peru which reaches a height of approximately 4,200 m (13,800 ft). It is located in the Junín Region, Tarma Province, Cajas District.
