= Tarmatambo =

Archaeological site in Peru

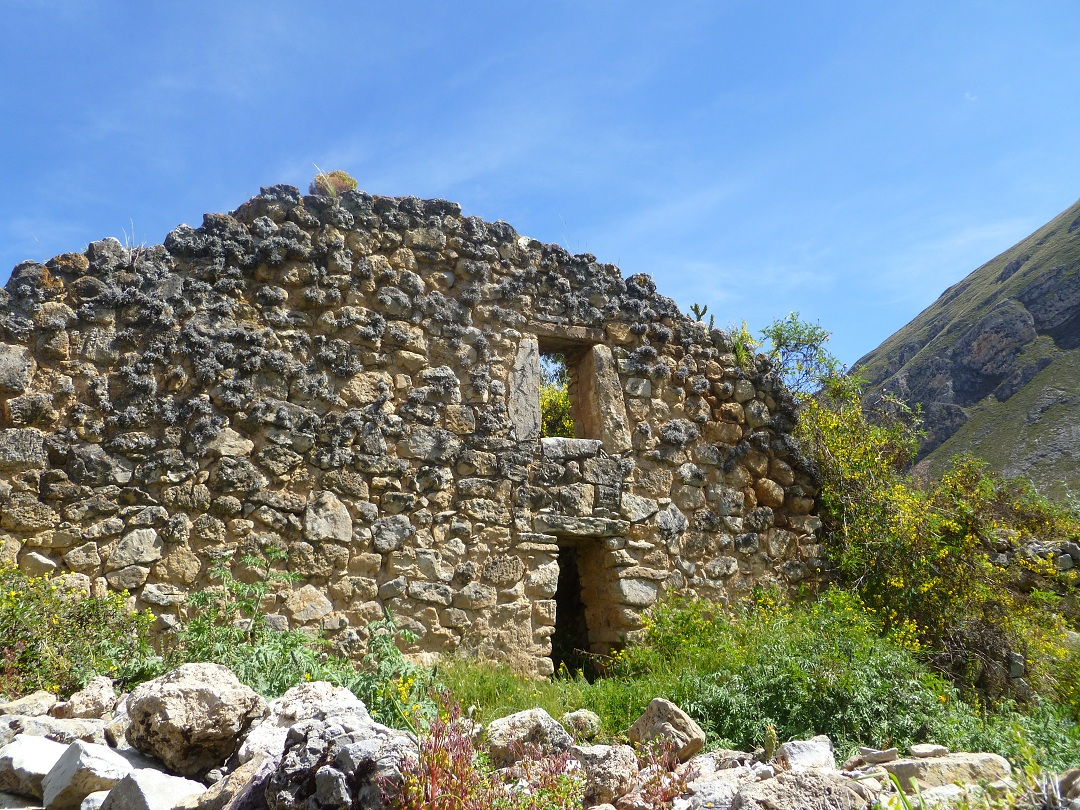
- Ruins at Tarmatambo

- Location within Peru
- 11°28′35″S 75°41′11″W
- Location: Peru
- Region: Junín Region

Tarmatambo or Tarmatampu (possibly from Tarma an ethnic group, Quechua tampu inn) is an archaeological site in the Junín Region in Peru. It is located in the Tarma Province, Tarma District, in the community of the same name. The site was declared a National Cultural Heritage by Resolución Directoral Nacional No. 040/INC on January 29, 2002.
