= Llumpa District =

Coordinates: 8.917°S 77.367°W

Llumpa
- District
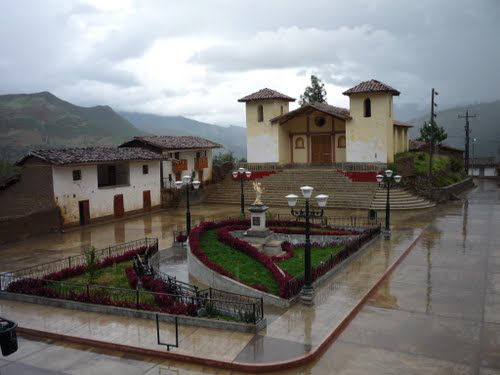
- Llumpa
- Interactive map of Llumpa
- Country: Peru
- Region: Ancash
- Province: Mariscal Luzuriaga
- Founded: October 28, 1889
- Capital: Llumpa

Area
  - Total: 143.27 km^{2} (55.32 sq mi)
- Elevation: 3,200 m (10,500 ft)

Population (2005 census)
  - Total: 6,149
  - Density: 42.92/km^{2} (111.2/sq mi)
- Time zone: UTC-5 (PET)
- UBIGEO: 021306

Llumpa District is one of eight districts of the Mariscal Luzuriaga Province in Peru. This district was created by Law, dated at October 28, 1889, president of Perou: Andrés A. Cáceres

== Ethnic groups ==
The people in the district are mainly indigenous citizens of Quechua descent. Quechua is the language which the majority of the population (95.92%) learnt to speak in childhood, 3.12% of the residents started speaking using the Spanish language (2007 Peru Census).

== See also ==
- Ancash Quechua

== See also ==
- Pukarahu
