= Kuntur Punta =

Mountain in Peru

- Location within Peru

Highest point
- Elevation: 4,400 m (14,400 ft)
- Coordinates: 11°04′54″S 75°46′02″W

Geography
- Location: Peru, Junín Region

Kuntur Punta (Quechua kuntur condor, Ancash Quechua punta peak; ridge, "condor peak (or ridge)", also spelled Cóndor Punta) is a mountain in the Andes of Peru which reaches a height of approximately 4,400 m (14,400 ft). It is located in the Junín Region, Tarma Province, Cajas District.
