= Pukara Punta =

Mountain in Peru

- Location within Peru

Highest point
- Elevation: 4,400 m (14,400 ft)
- Coordinates: 11°13′20″S 75°49′57″W

Geography
- Location: Peru, Junín Region

Pukara Punta (Quechua pukara fortress, punta peak; ridge, "fortress peak (or ridge)", also spelled Pucará Punta) is a mountain in the Andes of Peru which reaches a height of approximately 4,400 m (14,400 ft). It lies in the Junín Region, Tarma Province, on the border of the districts of Palcamayo and Cajas.
