= Sisurcana polychondra =

Scientific classification
- Kingdom: Animalia
- Phylum: Arthropoda
- Clade: Pancrustacea
- Class: Insecta
- Order: Lepidoptera
- Family: Tortricidae
- Genus: Sisurcana
- Species: S. polychondra

Binomial name
- Sisurcana polychondra Razowski & Becker, 2004

Species of moth

Sisurcana polychondra is a species of moth of the family Tortricidae. It is found in Ecuador (Morona Santiago Province and Napo Province).
