= Sisurcana aluminias =

Scientific classification
- Kingdom: Animalia
- Phylum: Arthropoda
- Class: Insecta
- Order: Lepidoptera
- Family: Tortricidae
- Genus: Sisurcana
- Species: S. aluminias

Binomial name
- Sisurcana aluminias (Meyrick, 1912)

Synonyms
- Capua aluminias Meyrick, 1912

Species of moth

Sisurcana aluminias is a species of moth of the family Tortricidae. It is found in Colombia and Ecuador in the provinces of Cotopaxi and Carchi.
