= Putaqa Wayi =

Mountain in Peru

- Location within Peru

Highest point
- Elevation: 4,400 m (14,400 ft)
- Coordinates: 11°04′31″S 75°42′35″W

Geography
- Location: Peru, Junín Region

Putaqa Wayi (Quechua putaqa Rumex peruanus, Ancash Quechua wayi house, "putaqa house", also spelled Putajahuay) is a mountain in the Andes of Peru reaching the height of approximately 4,400 m (14,400 ft). It is located in the Junín Region, Tarma Province, Cajas District.
