= Kuntur Sinqa (Junín) =

Mountain in Peru

- Location within Peru

Highest point
- Elevation: 4,000 m (13,000 ft)
- Coordinates: 11°26′56″S 75°49′42″W

Geography
- Location: Peru, Junín Region

Kuntur Sinqa (Quechua kuntur condor, sinqa nose, "condor nose", also spelled Cóndorsencca) is a mountain in the Andes of Peru which reaches a height of approximately 4,000 m (13,000 ft). It lies in the Junín Region, Tarma Province, Tarma District.
