= Sisurcana llaviucana =

Scientific classification
- Kingdom: Animalia
- Phylum: Arthropoda
- Class: Insecta
- Order: Lepidoptera
- Family: Tortricidae
- Genus: Sisurcana
- Species: S. llaviucana

Binomial name
- Sisurcana llaviucana Razowski & Pelz, 2007

Species of moth

Sisurcana llaviucana is a species of moth of the family Tortricidae. It is found in Ecuador (Azuay Province and Loja Province).
