= Pucaraju (Lucma) =

Mountain in Peru

- Location within Peru

Highest point
- Elevation: 5,025 m (16,486 ft)
- Coordinates: 8°55′49″S 77°32′39″W

Geography
- Location: Ancash, Peru
- Parent range: Cordillera Blanca

Climbing
- First ascent: 1-1955 via W. slopes, S. peak, traverse long summit ridge: N.W. ridge-1973.

Pucaraju or Pukaraju (possibly from Quechua puka red, rahu snow, ice, mountain with snow, "red snow-covered mountain") is a mountain in the Cordillera Blanca in the Andes of Peru, about 5,025 metres (16,486 ft) high. It is situated in the Ancash Region, Mariscal Luzuriaga Province, Lucma District, in the Pomabamba Province, Llumpa District, and in the Yungay Province, Yanama District. Pucaraju lies southeast of Taulliraju and west of the lakes named Wiqruqucha and Orgoncocha.

The IGN-Peru map and the UGEL map of Yungay show the name of the mountain as "Pacaraju".
