= Rumi Pukyu =

Mountain in Peru

- Location within Peru

Highest point
- Elevation: 4,200 m (13,800 ft)
- Coordinates: 11°19′04″S 75°39′13″W

Geography
- Location: Peru, Junín Region

Rumi Pukyu (Quechua rumi stone, pukyu spring, well, "stone spring (or well)", also spelled Rumipuquio) is a mountain in the Andes of Peru which reaches a height of approximately 4,200 m (13,800 ft). It lies in the Junín Region, Tarma Province, on the border of the districts of Acobamba and Huasahuasi. Rumi Pukyu lies on the left bank of the Pallqamayu, north of the village of Acobamba.
