= Sisurcana citrochyta =

Scientific classification
- Domain: Eukaryota
- Kingdom: Animalia
- Phylum: Arthropoda
- Class: Insecta
- Order: Lepidoptera
- Family: Tortricidae
- Genus: Sisurcana
- Species: S. citrochyta

Binomial name
- Sisurcana citrochyta (Meyrick, 1926)

Synonyms
- Philedone citrochyta Meyrick, 1926

Species of moth

Sisurcana citrochyta is a species of moth of the family Tortricidae. It is found in Ecuador (Pastaza, Morona-Santiago, Tungurahua, and Napo Provinces).
