= Sisurcana umbellifera =

Scientific classification
- Kingdom: Animalia
- Phylum: Arthropoda
- Class: Insecta
- Order: Lepidoptera
- Family: Tortricidae
- Genus: Sisurcana
- Species: S. umbellifera

Binomial name
- Sisurcana umbellifera (Meyrick, 1926)

Synonyms
- Eulia umbellifera Meyrick, 1926

Species of moth

Sisurcana umbellifera is a species of moth of the family Tortricidae. It is found in Colombia and Ecuador.
