= Sisurcana leprana =

Scientific classification
- Domain: Eukaryota
- Kingdom: Animalia
- Phylum: Arthropoda
- Class: Insecta
- Order: Lepidoptera
- Family: Tortricidae
- Genus: Sisurcana
- Species: S. leprana

Binomial name
- Sisurcana leprana (C. Felder & Rogenhofer, 1875)

Synonyms
- Heterognomon leprana Felder & Rogenhofer, 1875

Species of moth

Sisurcana leprana is a species of moth of the family Tortricidae. It is known Colombia (Bogota – its type locality) and Peru; it is probably more widespread.
