= Sisurcana pascoana =

Scientific classification
- Kingdom: Animalia
- Phylum: Arthropoda
- Class: Insecta
- Order: Lepidoptera
- Family: Tortricidae
- Genus: Sisurcana
- Species: S. pascoana

Binomial name
- Sisurcana pascoana Razowski & Wojtusiak, 2010

Species of moth

Sisurcana pascoana is a species of moth of the family Tortricidae. It is known from the Yanachaga–Chemillén National Park in the Pasco Region, Peru. The type series was collected at 2,400–2,420 m (7,870–7,940 ft) above sea level.

The wingspan is about 22 mm in males.

== Etymology ==
The specific name refers to the Pasco Region where the species is known from.
