= Musga District =

Coordinates: 8.85266°S 77.35375°W

Musga
- District
- Interactive map of Musga
- Country: Peru
- Region: Ancash
- Province: Mariscal Luzuriaga
- Founded: May 12, 1962
- Capital: Musga

Government
  - Mayor: Manuel Teodosio Soto Evangelista

Area
  - Total: 39.72 km^{2} (15.34 sq mi)
- Elevation: 2,970 m (9,740 ft)

Population (2005 census)
  - Total: 1,148
  - Density: 28.90/km^{2} (74.86/sq mi)
- Time zone: UTC-5 (PET)
- UBIGEO: 021308

Musga District is one of eight districts of the Mariscal Luzuriaga Province in Peru.

== Ethnic groups ==
The people in the district are mainly indigenous citizens of Quechua descent. Quechua is the language which the majority of the population (83.45%) learnt to speak in childhood, 15.87% of the residents started speaking using the Spanish language (2007 Peru Census).

== See also ==
- Ancash Quechua
