= Yana Urqu (Junín) =

Mountain in Peru

- Location within Peru

Highest point
- Elevation: 4,200 m (13,800 ft)
- Coordinates: 11°19′04″S 75°38′27″W

Geography
- Location: Peru, Junín Region

Yana Urqu (Quechua yana black, urqu mountain, "black mountain", also spelled Yanaorgo) is a mountain in the Andes of Peru which reaches a height of approximately 4,200 m (13,800 ft). It lies in the Junín Region, Tarma Province, Acobamba District, northeast of Acobamba.
