= Palcamayo District =

Coordinates: 11.2941°S 75.7794°W

Palcamayo P'allqamayu
- District
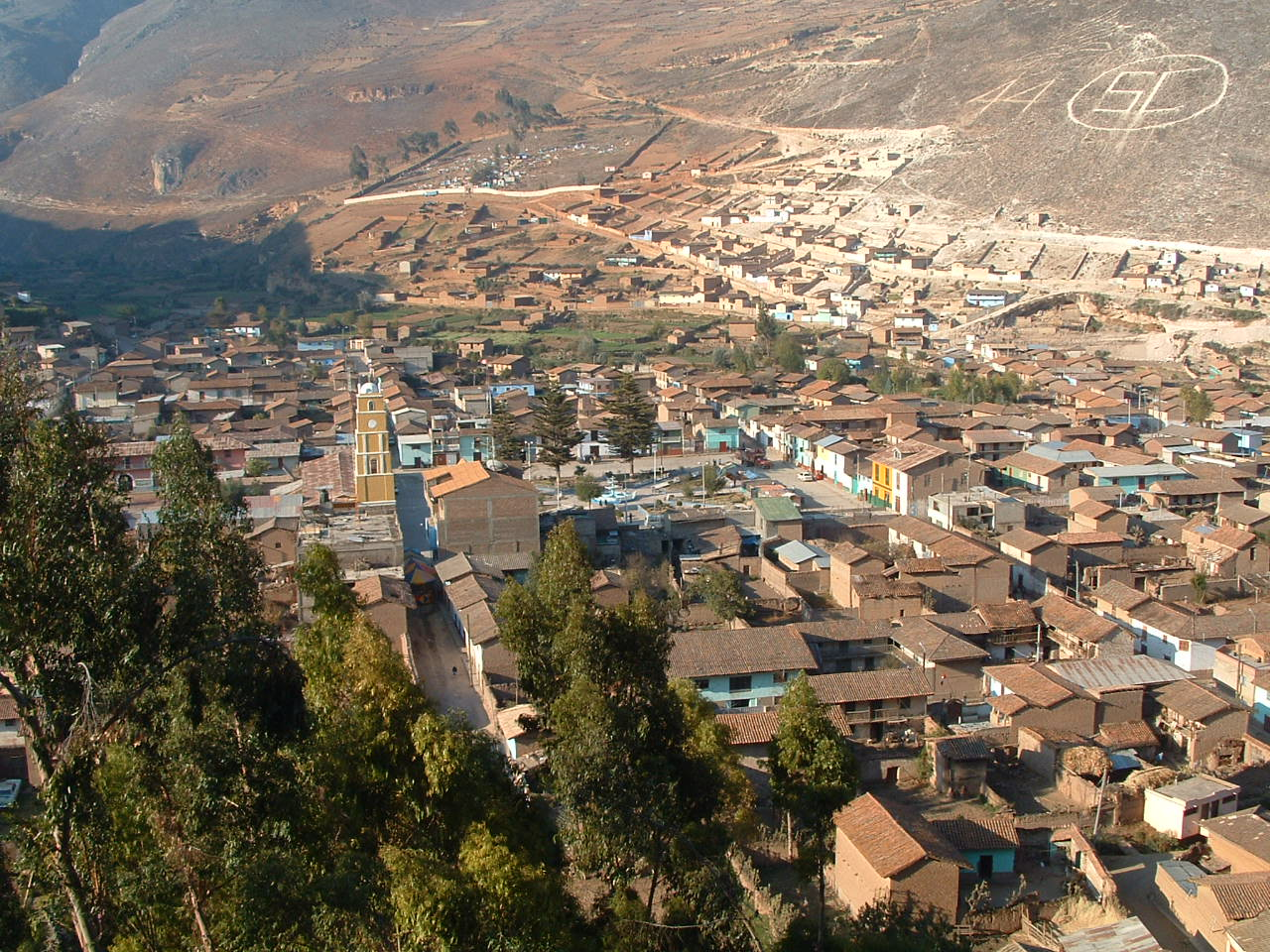
- Interactive map of Palcamayo
- Country: Peru
- Region: Junín
- Province: Tarma
- Founded: January 2, 1857
- Capital: Palcamayo

Government
  - Mayor: Jairo Carhuas

Area
  - Total: 169.24 km^{2} (65.34 sq mi)
- Elevation: 3,339 m (10,955 ft)

Population (2005 census)
  - Total: 5,350
  - Density: 31.6/km^{2} (81.9/sq mi)
- Time zone: UTC-5 (PET)
- UBIGEO: 120707

Palcamayo District is one of nine districts of the province Tarma in Peru.

== See also ==
- Pukara Punta
