= Waskhaqucha (Cajas) =

Lake in Tarma Province, Peru

- Location within Peru
- Location: Peru; Junín Region
- Coordinates: 11°08′33″S 75°49′18″W
- Max. length: 1.87 km (1.16 mi)
- Max. width: 0.43 km (0.27 mi)
- Surface elevation: 4,312 m (14,147 ft)

Waskhaqucha (Quechua waskha (also waska) rope, qucha lake, also spelled Huascacocha) or Wask'aqucha (Quechua wask'a rectangle) is a lake in Peru located in the Junín Region, Tarma Province, San Pedro de Cajas District. It is situated at a height of about 4,312 metres (14,147 ft), about 1.87 km long and 0.43 km at its widest point. Waskhaqucha lies southeast of Chinchayqucha and northeast of a smaller lake named Pukaqucha, north of the village of Patakancha.
