= San Luis, Ancash =

Coordinates: 9°05′27″S 77°19′38″W

San Luis
- Town
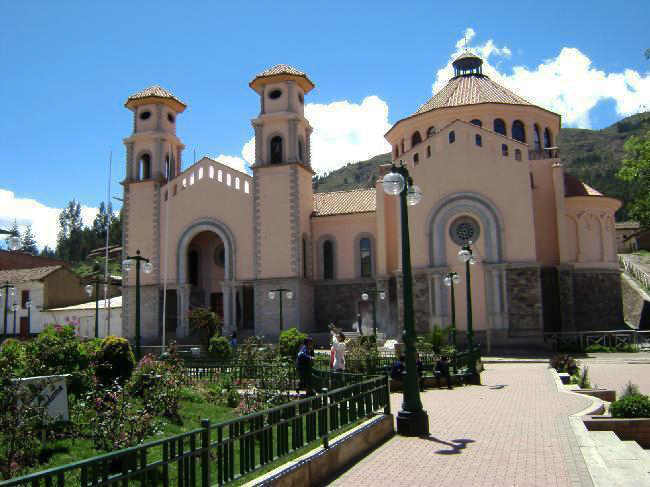
- Church of San Luis
- Interactive map of San Luis
- Country: Peru
- Region: Ancash
- Province: Carlos Fermín Fitzcarrald
- District: San Luis

Government
  - Mayor: Wilder Carlos Fitzcarrald Bravo
- Elevation: 3,131 m (10,272 ft)

San Luis is a town in central Peru. It serves as the capital of the province of Carlos Fermín Fitzcarrald in the Ancash region.
