= Mariscal Luzuriaga province =

Coordinates: 8°52′59″S 77°21′00″W

Mariscal Luzuriaga
- Province
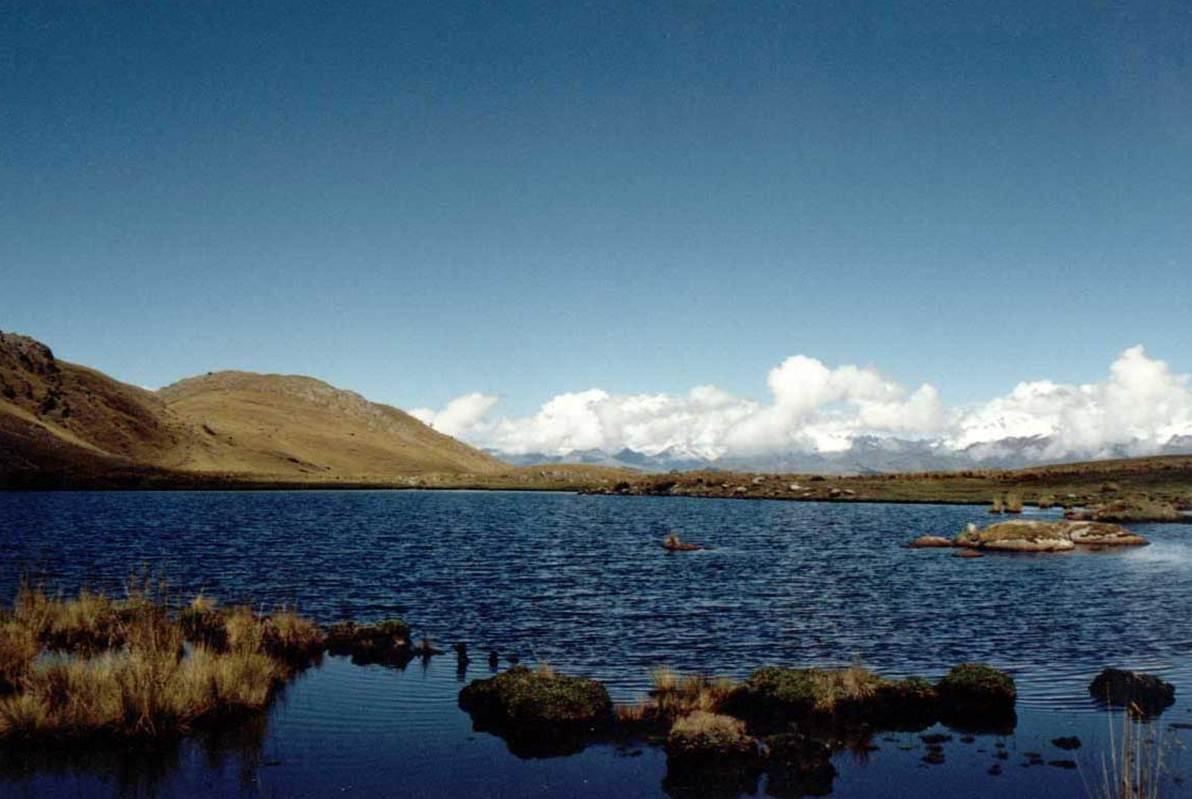
- Looking west across a lake near Jarhuajara to the Cordillera Blanca

- Flag Coat of arms

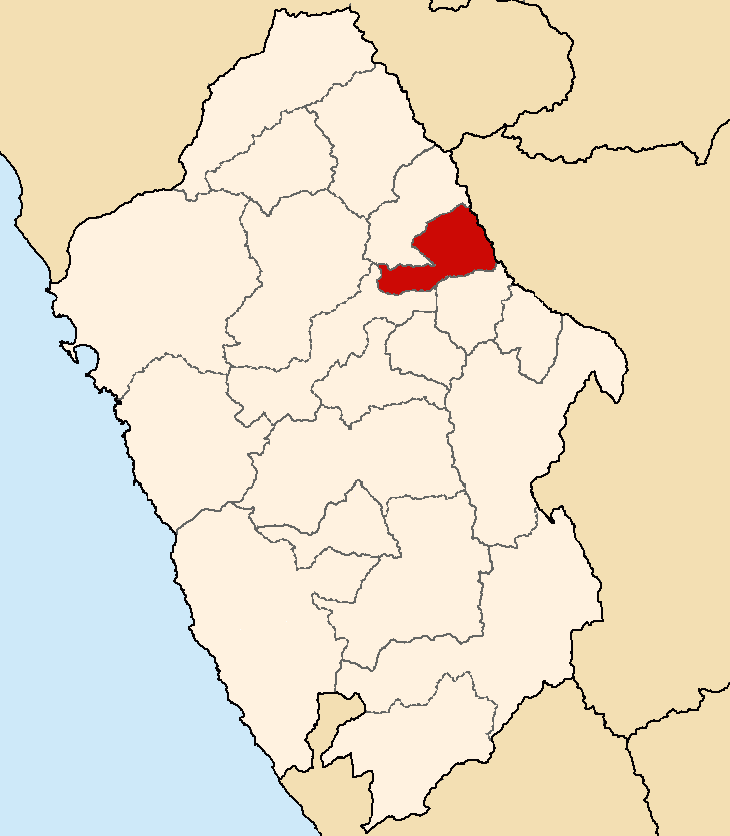
- Location of Mariscal Luzuriaga in the Ancash Region
- Country: Peru
- Region: Ancash
- Capital: Piscobamba

Government
  - Mayor: Enrique Ponte Ayala

Area
  - Total: 731 km^{2} (282 sq mi)

Population
  - Total: 20,284
  - Density: 27.7/km^{2} (71.9/sq mi)

Mariscal Luzuriaga (Spanish: mariscal, 'marshal') is one of 20 provinces of the Ancash Region in Peru. It was created by law 12541 on 12 January 1956, and named after the Peruvian marshal and Argentine general Toribio de Luzuriaga.

Since the Inca roads crossed its territory up to the Ecuador, where its capital Piscobamba is located now, there was a strategic tambo during the Inca's time. Pisqu Pampa means "bird plain" in Quechua. This place has a special attraction due to four mythical hills: Kampanayuq, Aswaq, Amañico and Wankash. Bloody battles were performed here by the armies of the Inca Tupac Yupanqui and the conchucos, piscopampas and huaras. See Garcilaso: "Comentarios reales" .

== Geography ==
One of the highest peaks of the province is Tuqtupampa at approximately 5,240 m (17,190 ft). Other mountains are listed below:

- Allqu Maqasqa
- Anta Hirka
- Ch'aki Qucha
- Milla Hirka
- Muru Qucha
- Puka Hirka
- Pukarahu
- Uchu Hirka
- Ullukuyuq
- Uqsha Hirka
- Tawlli
- Usnu
- Wachaq Wari
- Yana Mach'ay

== Political division ==
Mariscal Luzuriaga is divided into eight districts, which are:

- Casca
- Eleazar Guzman Barron
- Fidel Olivas Escudero
- Llama
- Llumpa
- Lucma
- Musga
- Piscobamba

== Ethnic groups ==
The people in the province are mainly indigenous citizens of Quechua descent. Quechua is the language which the majority of the population (90.95%) learnt to speak in childhood, 8.51% of the residents started speaking using the Spanish language (2007 Peru Census).

== 50th Anniversary ==
In 2006, this province arrived at the 50th anniversary of its creation, by Law No. 12541, dated at January 12, 1956; president of Peru, general Manuel A. Odría. For those date edit, por celebrate the 50 years of provincial life, the book "Libro de Oro Luzuriaguino", with participation of a pool of authors.

== See also ==
- Qanchisqucha
- Urqunqucha
- Wiqruqucha
