= Tarma District =

Tarma
- District
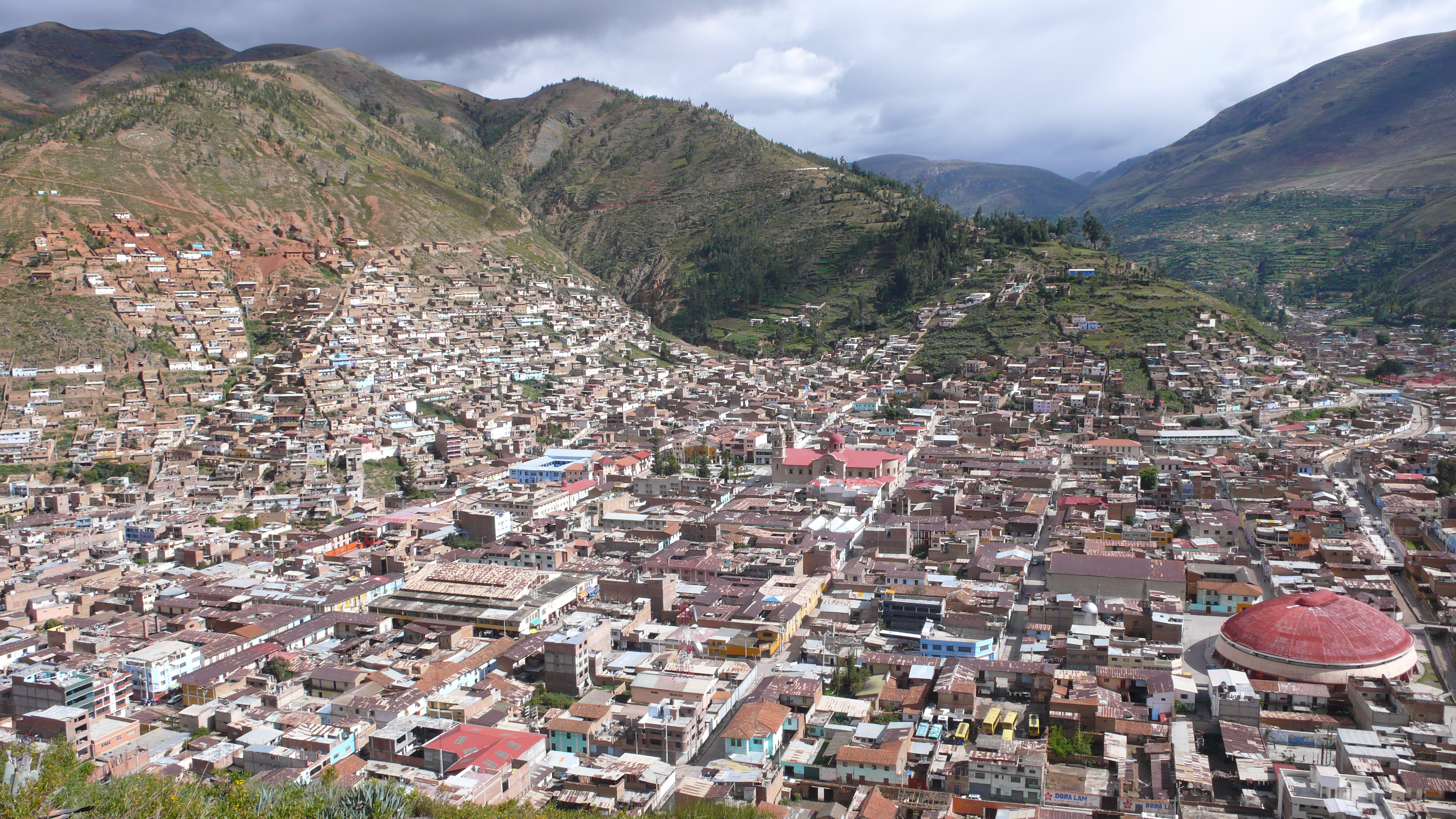
- Tarma
- Interactive map of Tarma
- Country: Peru
- Region: Junín
- Province: Tarma
- Capital: Tarma

Government
  - Mayor: Fathy Jiménez

Area
  - Total: 459.95 km^{2} (177.59 sq mi)
- Elevation: 3,053 m (10,016 ft)

Population (2017)
  - Total: 47,775
  - Density: 103.87/km^{2} (269.02/sq mi)
- Time zone: UTC-5 (PET)
- UBIGEO: 120701
- Website: munitarma.gob.pe

Tarma District is one of nine districts of the province Tarma in Peru.

The archaeological site Tarmatampu is situated in the district.

== Geography ==
Some of the highest mountains of the district are listed below:

- Antamarka
- Hirkan Kancha
- Kunkan
- Kuntur Sinqa
- Kuntur Wayin
- Misapata
- Pirwa Pirwa
- P'unchawmarka
- Sarawisa
- Uchku Mach'ay
- Ukru Kancha
- Wank'a Wank'a
- Warmi Sinqa
- Yuraq Kancha
- Yuraq Marka

== Climate ==
Climate data for Tarma, elevation 3,025 m (9,925 ft), (1991–2020)
Month	Jan	Feb	Mar	Apr	May	Jun	Jul	Aug	Sep	Oct	Nov	Dec	Year
Mean daily maximum °C (°F)	20.3 (68.5)	20.1 (68.2)	20.4 (68.7)	21.0 (69.8)	21.3 (70.3)	20.9 (69.6)	20.5 (68.9)	20.5 (68.9)	20.7 (69.3)	20.8 (69.4)	21.2 (70.2)	20.5 (68.9)	20.7 (69.2)
Mean daily minimum °C (°F)	6.9 (44.4)	6.9 (44.4)	6.9 (44.4)	6.3 (43.3)	5.1 (41.2)	3.8 (38.8)	3.5 (38.3)	4.1 (39.4)	5.7 (42.3)	6.5 (43.7)	6.6 (43.9)	6.9 (44.4)	5.8 (42.4)
Average precipitation mm (inches)	55.3 (2.18)	62.8 (2.47)	59.9 (2.36)	28.5 (1.12)	11.0 (0.43)	4.7 (0.19)	5.9 (0.23)	6.3 (0.25)	12.7 (0.50)	32.1 (1.26)	29.4 (1.16)	55.4 (2.18)	364 (14.33)
Source: National Meteorology and Hydrology Service of Peru

== Images ==
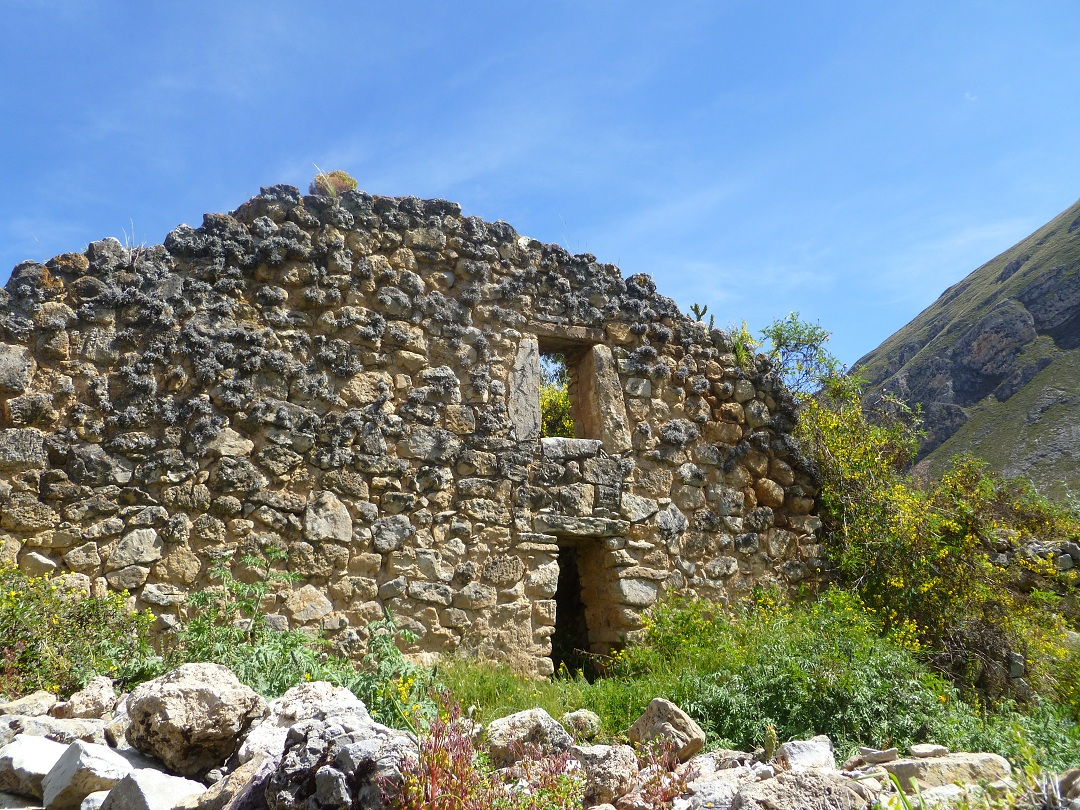
Tarmatampu
