= Maray Qalla =

Archaeological site in Peru

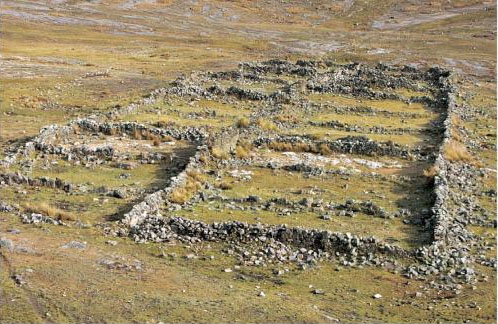
- Maray Qalla
- Interactive map of Maray Qalla
- 9°04′43″S 77°14′23″W
- Cultures: Inca
- Location: Peru, Ancash Region

Maray Qalla (Quechua maran, maray batan or grindstone, maray to tear down, to knock down, qalla carved stone, cobblestone; circular spindle disk; cheek, also spelled Maraycalla, Maraycalle) is an archaeological site in Peru. It is situated in the Ancash Region, Carlos Fermín Fitzcarrald Province. Maray Qalla lies at a section of the Qhapaq Ñan, the Inca road system.
