= San Luis District, Carlos Fermín Fitzcarrald =

Coordinates: 9°04′59″S 77°21′00″W

San Luis District
- District
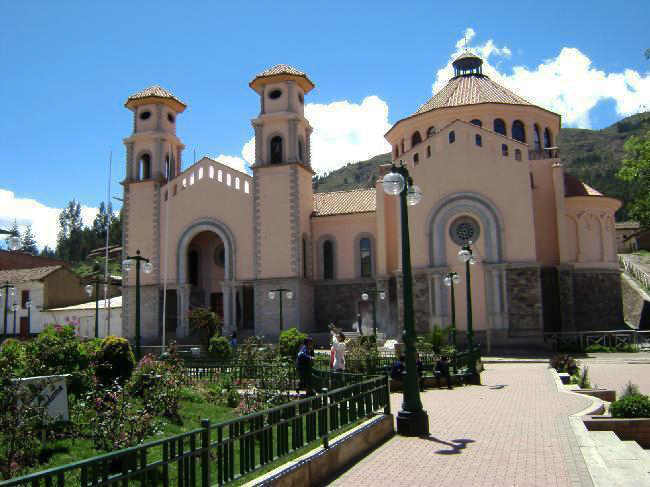
- Church of San Luis
- Interactive map of San Luis District
- Country: Peru
- Region: Ancash
- Province: Carlos Fermín Fitzcarrald
- Capital: San Luis

Government
  - Mayor: Wilder Carlos Fitzcarrald Bravo

Area
  - Total: 256.45 km^{2} (99.02 sq mi)
- Elevation: 3,131 m (10,272 ft)

Population (2005 census)
  - Total: 11,887
  - Density: 46.352/km^{2} (120.05/sq mi)
- Time zone: UTC-5 (PET)
- UBIGEO: 020701

San Luis District is one of three districts of the province Carlos Fermín Fitzcarrald in Peru.

== Ethnic groups ==
The people in the district are mainly indigenous citizens of Quechua descent. Quechua is the language which the majority of the population (88.73%) learnt to speak in childhood, 10.87 % of the residents started speaking using the Spanish language (2007 Peru Census).

== See also ==
- Wachuqucha
