= Yanamayo =

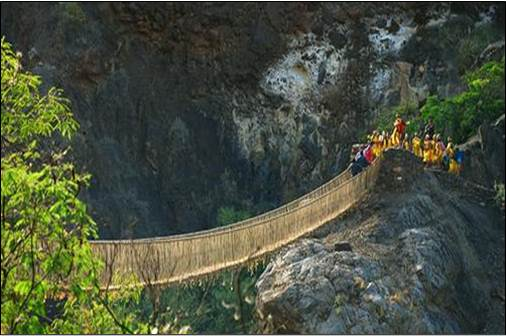
- Suspension bridge of Pucayacu across the river Yanamayo which connects the districts Llama and Yauya
- Etymology: Quechua

Location
- Country: Peru
- Region: Ancash Region, Huánuco Region

Physical characteristics
- Mouth: Marañón River

Basin features
- Tributaries
  - left: Pomapampa, Pampachara
  - right: Tinkuq, San Nicolás

Yanamayo (possibly from Quechua yana black, mayu river, "black river") is a river in the Ancash Region in Peru. It flows along the border between the provinces Carlos Fermín Fitzcarrald and Mariscal Luzuriaga and empties into the Marañón River as a left tributary. The confluence is on the border of the districts Eleazar Guzman Barron, San Nicolás and Canchabamba.

== See also ==
- Huachucocha
