= Waskhaqucha (Huasahuasi, Huacuas) =

Lake in Peru

- Location within Peru
- Location: Peru; Junín Region
- Coordinates: 11°09′38″S 75°37′15″W
- Max. length: 0.89 km (0.55 mi)
- Max. width: 0.35 km (0.22 mi)
- Surface elevation: 3,847 m (12,621 ft)

Waskhaqucha (Quechua waskha (also waska) rope, qucha lake, hispanicized spelling Huascacocha) or Wask'aqucha (Quechua wask'a rectangle) is a lake in Peru located in the Junín Region, Tarma Province, Huasahuasi District. It is situated at a height of about 3,847 metres (12,621 ft), about 0.89 km long and 0.35 km at its widest point. Waskhaqucha lies north of the Huasahuasi, near the village Huacuas, north east of it.
