= Piscobamba District =

Coordinates: 8°52′59″S 77°21′00″W

Piscobamba Pisqupampa
- District
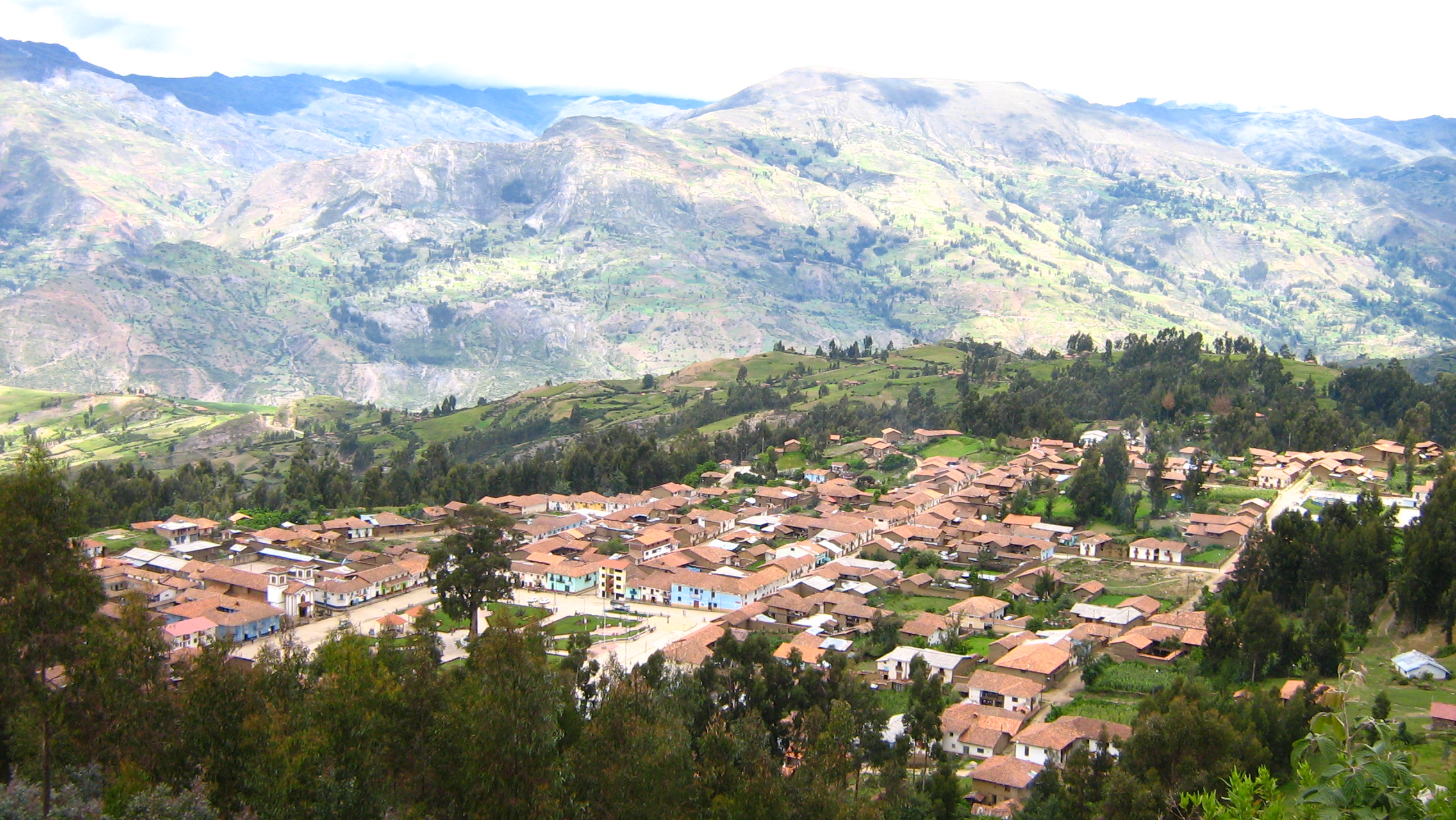
- Interactive map of Piscobamba
- Country: Peru
- Region: Ancash
- Province: Mariscal Luzuriaga
- Capital: Piscobamba

Government
  - Mayor: Policarpio William Alvarez Vega

Area
  - Total: 45.93 km^{2} (17.73 sq mi)
- Elevation: 3,281 m (10,764 ft)

Population (2005 census)
  - Total: 3,631
  - Density: 79.06/km^{2} (204.8/sq mi)
- Time zone: UTC-5 (PET)
- UBIGEO: 021301

Piscobamba District is one of eight districts of the Mariscal Luzuriaga Province in Peru.

== Ethnic groups ==
The people in the district are mainly indigenous citizens of Quechua descent. Quechua is the language which the majority of the population (74.84%) learnt to speak in childhood, 24.93% of the residents started speaking using the Spanish language (2007 Peru Census).

== See also ==
- Ancash Quechua
