= Palca District, Tarma =

Palca P'allqa
- District
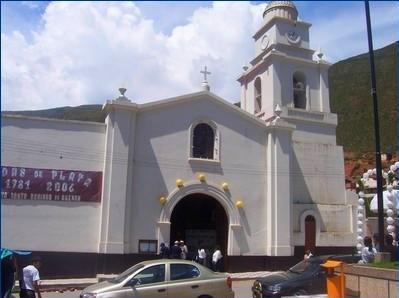
- Church of Palca
- Interactive map of Palca
- Country: Peru
- Region: Junín
- Province: Tarma
- Founded: January 2, 1857
- Capital: Palca

Government
  - Mayor: Wilfredo Mayma

Area
  - Total: 378.08 km^{2} (145.98 sq mi)
- Elevation: 2,739 m (8,986 ft)

Population (2005 census)
  - Total: 7,732
  - Density: 20.45/km^{2} (52.97/sq mi)
- Time zone: UTC-5 (PET)
- UBIGEO: 120706

Palca District is one of nine districts of the province Tarma in Peru.
