= Canchiscocha (Mariscal Luzuriaga) =

Lake in Ancash, Peru

- Location within Peru
- Location: Peru; Ancash Region
- Coordinates: 8°47′26″S 77°19′57″W

Canchiscocha (possibly from Quechua qanchis seven qucha lake, "seven lakes") or Janchiscocha, is a lake in Peru located in the Ancash Region, Mariscal Luzuriaga Province, Fidel Olivas Escudero District. It is situated between the lake Yanacocha in the north and another lake named Yanacocha in the southwest.
