= La Unión District, Tarma =

La Unión
- District
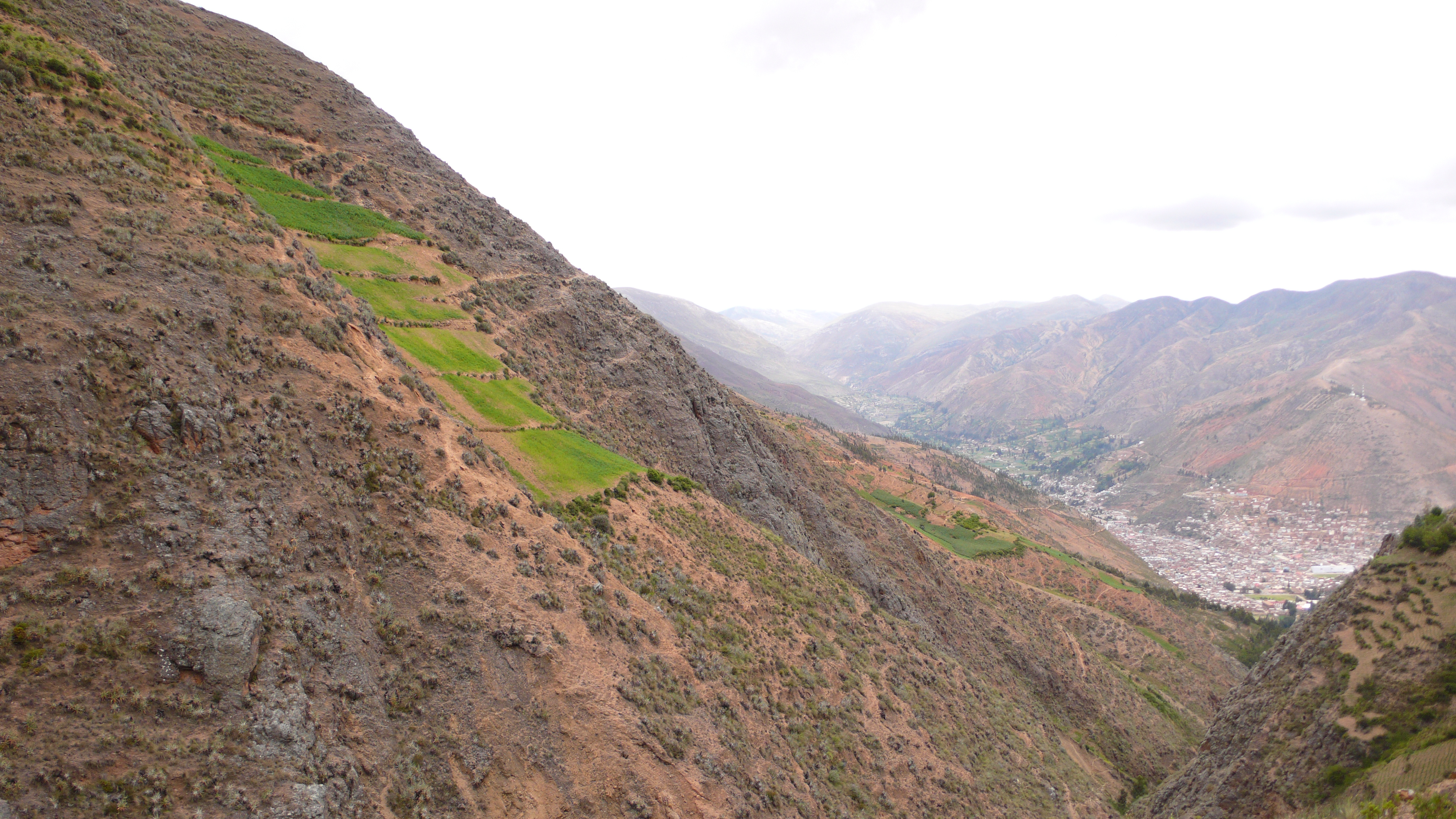
- Interactive map of La Unión
- Country: Peru
- Region: Junín
- Province: Tarma
- Founded: April 30, 1936
- Capital: Leticia

Government
  - Mayor: Pedro López

Area
  - Total: 140.4 km^{2} (54.2 sq mi)
- Elevation: 3,520 m (11,550 ft)

Population (2017)
  - Total: 3,514
  - Density: 25.03/km^{2} (64.82/sq mi)
- Time zone: UTC-5 (PET)
- UBIGEO: 120705

La Unión District is one of nine districts of the province Tarma in Peru. It is bordered on the north by the districts of Palcamayo and San Pedro de Cajas; on the south by the district of Tarma; on the east by the district of Acobamba; and on the west by the Central Railroad of Cerro de Pasco.
