= Piscobamba =

Coordinates: 8°53′S 77°21′W

Piscobamba Pisqupampa
- Town
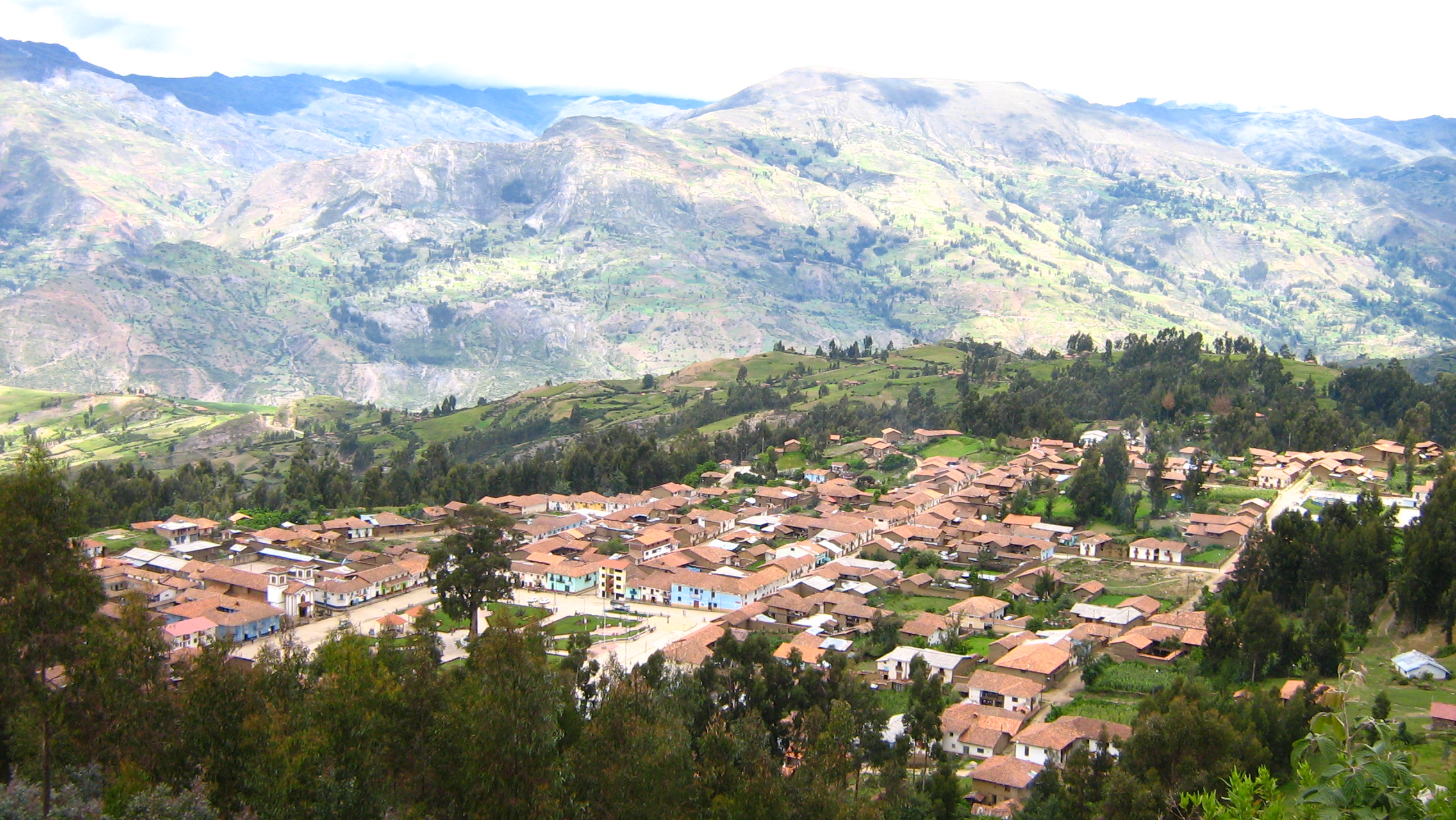
- Interactive map of Piscobamba
- Country: Peru
- Region: Ancash
- Province: Mariscal Luzuriaga
- District: Piscobamba
- Established: 1574

Government
  - Mayor: Roger Asencio Roca
- Elevation: 3,281 m (10,764 ft)

Population
  - Total: 2,252

Piscobamba (from Quechua Pisqupampa, pisqu, p'isqu bird, pampa plain) is a town in central Peru. It is the capital of the Mariscal Luzuriaga Province in the Ancash Region.
