= Qanchisqucha (Huasahuasi) =

Seven lakes in Peru

- Location within Peru
- Location: Peru; Junín Region, Tarma Province
- Coordinates: 11°7′10″S 75°44′30″W

Qanchisqucha (Quechua qanchis seven qucha lake, "seven lakes", hispanicized spellings Canchiscocha) is a group of seven lakes in Peru. They are situated in the Junín Region, Tarma Province, Huasahuasi District.
