= San Pedro de Cajas District =

San Pedro de Cajas
- District
- Coat of arms
- Interactive map of San Pedro de Cajas
- Country: Peru
- Region: Junín
- Province: Tarma
- Founded: November 2, 1932
- Capital: San Pedro de Cajas

Government
  - Mayor: Edson Leon Rojas

Area
  - Total: 537.31 km^{2} (207.46 sq mi)
- Elevation: 4,014 m (13,169 ft)

Population (2017)
  - Total: 3,547
  - Density: 6.601/km^{2} (17.10/sq mi)
- Time zone: UTC-5 (PET)
- UBIGEO: 120708
- Website: munisanpedrodecajas.gob.pe

San Pedro de Cajas District is one of nine districts of the province Tarma in Peru.

== Geography ==
Some of the highest mountains of the district are listed below:

- Hatun Raqra
- Hirkan Kancha
- Iski Pata
- Kampanayuq
- Kuntur Punta
- Machaq Punta
- Pukara Punta
- Putaqa Wayi
- Qanchisqucha
- Quchapata
- Qullqi Hirka
- Rasu Wallqan
- Rinrin Kancha
- Tinya Warkhu
- Wayta Pallana

== See also ==
- Qanchisqucha
- Waskaqucha
