= Qanchisqucha (San Pedro de Cajas) =

Lakes in Peru

- Location within Peru
- Location: Peru; Junín Region, Tarma Province
- Coordinates: 11°6′7.5″S 75°49′30″W

Qanchisqucha (Quechua qanchis seven qucha lake, "seven lakes", Hispanicized spellings Canchiscocha) is a group of seven lakes in Peru located in the Junín Region, Tarma Province, San Pedro de Cajas District. The lakes lie east of the mountain Urqunpunta (Orccompunta), at the foot of the mountain named Qanchisqucha.
