= Casca District =

District of Mariscal Luzuriaga, Peru

Coordinates: 8°52′01″S 77°25′01″W

Casca
- District
- Interactive map of Casca
- Country: Peru
- Region: Ancash
- Province: Mariscal Luzuriaga
- Founded: October 17, 1944
- Capital: Casca

Government
  - Mayor: Yone Walter Valverde Chauca

Area
  - Total: 77.38 km^{2} (29.88 sq mi)
- Elevation: 3,132 m (10,276 ft)

Population (2005 census)
  - Total: 4,278
  - Density: 55.29/km^{2} (143.2/sq mi)
- Time zone: UTC-5 (PET)
- UBIGEO: 021302

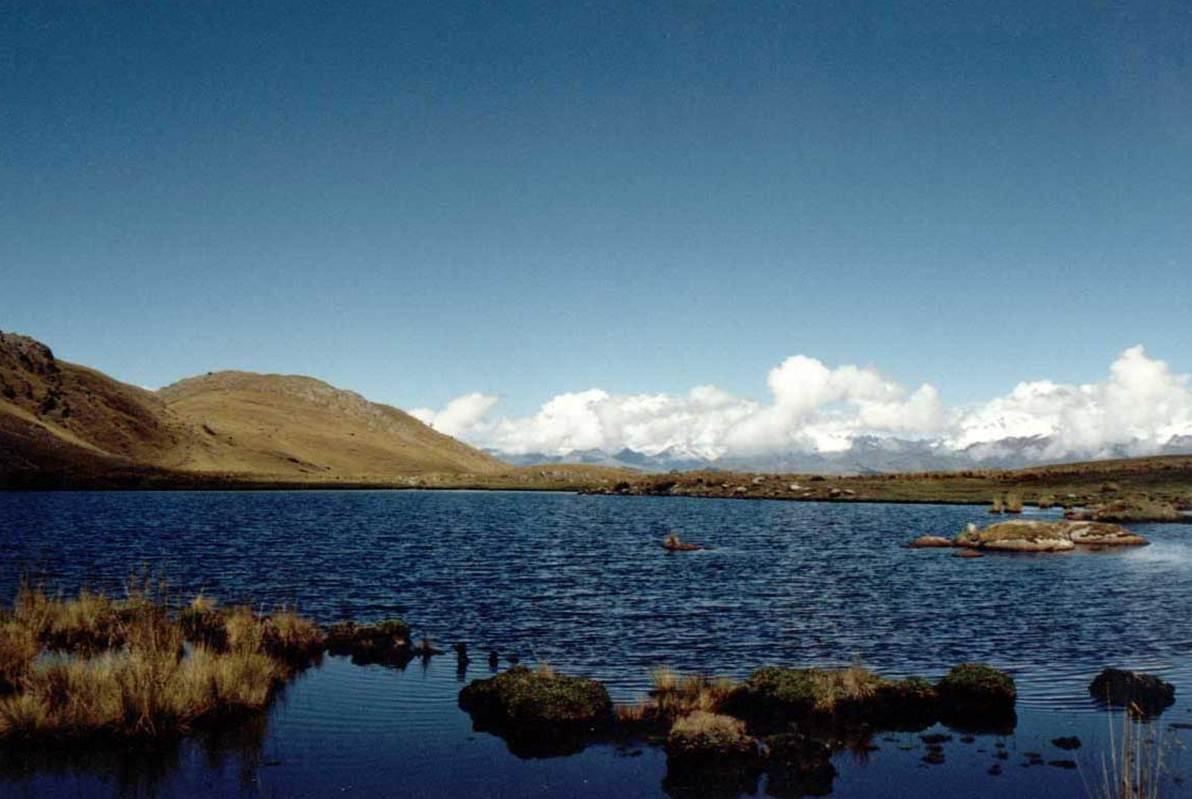
Laguna de Jarhuagjara in Casca, Peru

Casca District is one of eight districts of the Mariscal Luzuriaga Province in Peru.

== Ethnic groups ==
The people in the district are mainly indigenous citizens of Quechua descent. Quechua is the language which the majority of the population (93.09%) learnt to speak in childhood, 6.63% of the residents started speaking using the Spanish language (2007 Peru Census).

== See also ==
- Ancash Quechua
