= Huasahuasi District =

Huasahuasi Wasawasi
- District
- Interactive map of Huasahuasi; Wasawasi
- Country: Peru
- Region: Junín
- Province: Tarma
- Founded: January 02, 1857
- Capital: Huasahuasi

Government
  - Mayor: Germán Capcha

Area
  - Total: 652.15 km^{2} (251.80 sq mi)
- Elevation: 2,751 m (9,026 ft)

Population (2005 census)
  - Total: 13,436
  - Density: 20.603/km^{2} (53.361/sq mi)
- Time zone: UTC-5 (PET)
- UBIGEO: 120704

Huasahuasi District is one of nine districts of the province Tarma in Peru.

Every year, there is the Huasahuasi mtb downhill competition, which cross the village.

== Climate ==
Climate data for Huasahuasi, elevation 2,747 m (9,012 ft), (1991–2020)
Month	Jan	Feb	Mar	Apr	May	Jun	Jul	Aug	Sep	Oct	Nov	Dec	Year
Mean daily maximum °C (°F)	18.4 (65.1)	18.1 (64.6)	18.2 (64.8)	18.8 (65.8)	18.6 (65.5)	18.1 (64.6)	17.7 (63.9)	18.4 (65.1)	18.8 (65.8)	19.1 (66.4)	19.5 (67.1)	18.7 (65.7)	18.5 (65.4)
Mean daily minimum °C (°F)	10.3 (50.5)	10.5 (50.9)	10.3 (50.5)	9.3 (48.7)	7.8 (46.0)	6.4 (43.5)	5.9 (42.6)	6.8 (44.2)	8.4 (47.1)	9.4 (48.9)	9.7 (49.5)	10.3 (50.5)	8.8 (47.7)
Average precipitation mm (inches)	69.5 (2.74)	82.3 (3.24)	81.1 (3.19)	38.4 (1.51)	14.6 (0.57)	8.0 (0.31)	10.5 (0.41)	14.6 (0.57)	22.5 (0.89)	45.0 (1.77)	35.9 (1.41)	65.4 (2.57)	487.8 (19.18)
Source: National Meteorology and Hydrology Service of Peru

== See also ==
- Pampa Hermosa Reserved Zone
- Qanchisqucha
- Rumi Pukyu
- Waskaqucha (Huasahuasi, Huacuas)
- Waskaqucha (Huasahuasi, San Antonio)
