= Palcamayo =

Town in Junín, Peru

Coordinates: 11.2941°S 75.7794°W

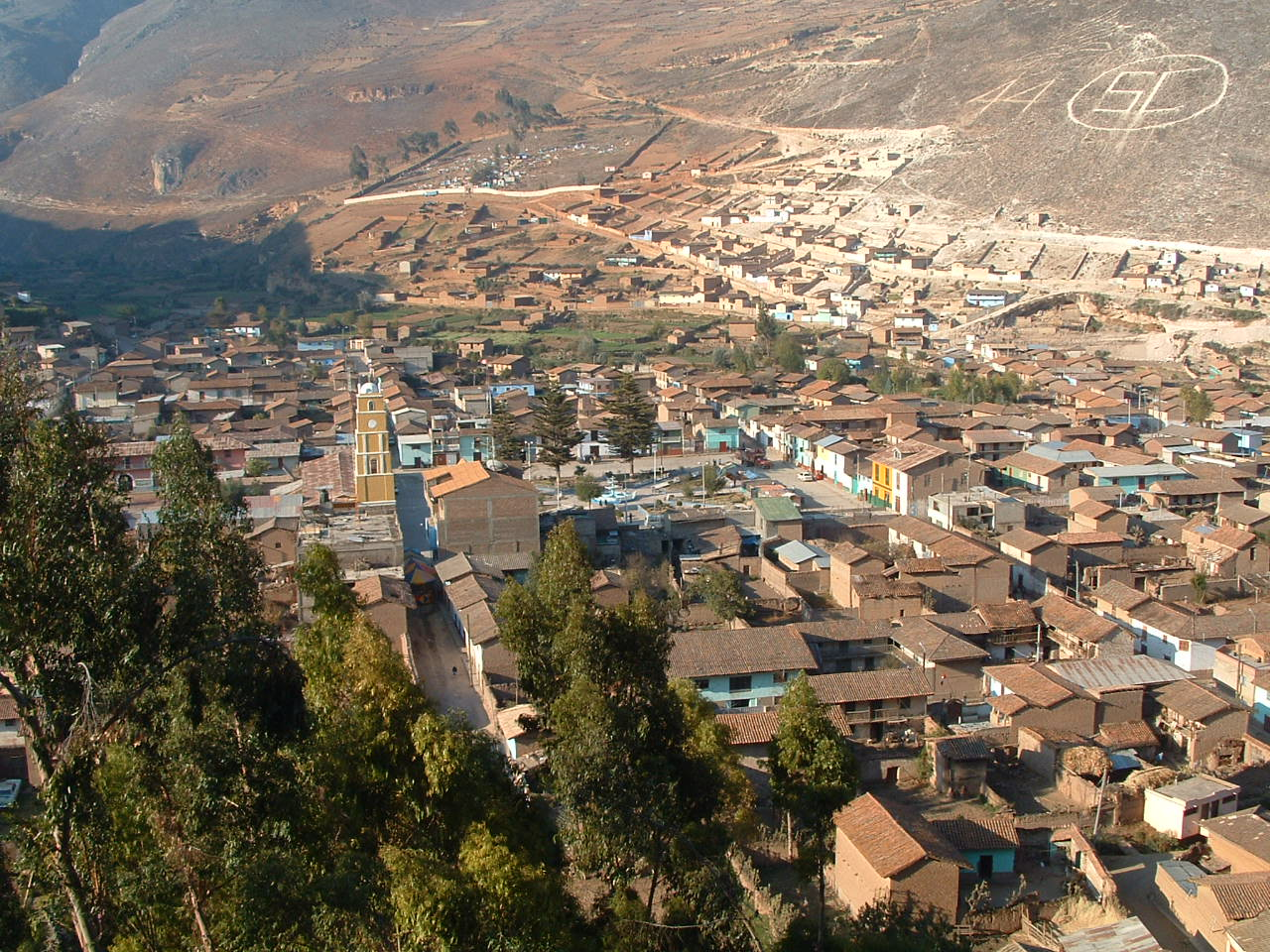
Panoramic view of Palcamayo

Palcamayo is a small town about 30 kilometers from Tarma, a city in Junín Region, Peru. It is a destination for tourists. There are a number of caves near the town. The population is less than 5,350 people, as of the 2005 census.

== Gruta de Guagapo ==
Close to the town, there is a significant cave, Gruta de Guagapo, one of South America's largest caves.
