= Tapo District =

Tapo
- District
- Interactive map of Tapo
- Country: Peru
- Region: Junín
- Province: Tarma
- Founded: January 2, 1857
- Capital: Tapo

Area
  - Total: 151.88 km^{2} (58.64 sq mi)
- Elevation: 3,140 m (10,300 ft)

Population (2017 census)
  - Total: 4,473
  - Density: 29.45/km^{2} (76.28/sq mi)
- Time zone: UTC-5 (PET)
- UBIGEO: 120709
- Website: munitapo.gob.pe

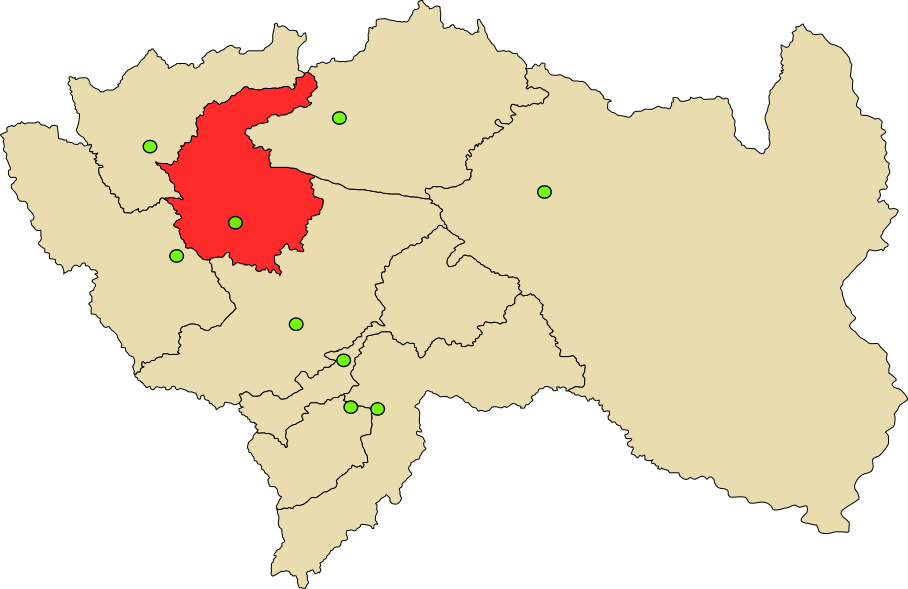
Tapo District in a map of the Province of Tarma in Peru

Tapo District is one of nine districts of the province Tarma in Peru.
