= Pampa Hermosa National Sanctuary =

Protected area in Peru

- IUCN category III (natural monument or feature)
- Location within Peru
- Location: Peru; Junín Region
- Coordinates: 11°02′12″S 75°28′50″W
- Area: 1,154,374 ha (2,852,520 acres)
- Established: 2005
- Governing body: SERNANP

A cedar tree known as “La Abuela” located in Pampa Hermosa National Sanctuary

Pampa Hermosa National Sanctuary (Spanish: Santuario Nacional Pampa Hermosa) is a protected area in Peru located in the region of Junín. It preserves one of the last pristine areas of montane forests in central Peru.

== Geography ==
Pampa Hermosa National Sanctuary is located between the provinces of Tarma and Chanchamayo, in the region of Junin, Peru. The area is mountainous, with an elvational range between 1340 and 3960 m.

== Ecology ==
Pampa Hermosa protects areas of tropical montane rainforests and high elevation grasslands.

=== Flora ===
Plant species found in this protected area include: Cedrela angustifolia, Juglans neotropica, Retrophyllum rospigliosii, Iriartea deltoidea, Weinmannia sp., Escallonia myrtilloides, Pseudolmedia rigida, Alnus acuminata, Prumnopitys montana, Guarea guidonia, Styrax andinus, etc.

=== Fauna ===
Animal species found in this protected area include: the Andean cock-of-the-rock, the Junín red squirrel, the yellow-throated toucan, the spectacled bear, the semicollared hawk, etc.
