= Lucma District, Mariscal Luzuriaga =

Coordinates: 8.917°S 77.417°W

Lucma
- District
- Interactive map of Lucma
- Country: Peru
- Region: Ancash
- Province: Mariscal Luzuriaga
- Founded: May 3, 1960
- Capital: Lucma

Government
  - Mayor: Senon Alejandro Garcia Antonio

Area
  - Total: 77.37 km^{2} (29.87 sq mi)
- Elevation: 3,083 m (10,115 ft)

Population (2005 census)
  - Total: 3,286
  - Density: 42.47/km^{2} (110.0/sq mi)
- Time zone: UTC-5 (PET)
- UBIGEO: 021307

Lucma District is one of eight districts of the Mariscal Luzuriaga Province in Peru.

== Ethnic groups ==
The people in the district are mainly indigenous citizens of Quechua descent. Quechua is the language which the majority of the population (94.19%) learnt to speak in childhood, 5.27% of the residents started speaking using the Spanish language (2007 Peru Census).

== See also ==
- Ancash Quechua
