= Rock-ice avalanche =

Landslide involving rock and ice

Satellite imagery showing the Trishuli River valley in Nepal before and after the August 2026 flood and rock-ice avalanche disaster

Rock-ice avalanche (also called ice-rock avalanche) is a type of landslide involving a mixture of rock and ice. It commonly occurs in high-mountain environments where glaciers, permafrost or other ice masses interact with unstable rock slopes. These avalanches can be highly mobile, travel long distances from their source, and transform during movement into other types of mass flow. They are associated with processes including glacier retreat, permafrost degradation and changing meltwater conditions, while individual failures can be triggered by rainfall, rapid warming, snowmelt, earthquakes and other factors.

Large rock-ice avalanches can produce cascading hazards. During movement, the mixture may fragment, entrain material from the ground and surrounding glaciers, melt ice, and incorporate water. It can potentially transform into a debris avalanche or debris flow. Some events have blocked rivers and formed landslide dams and lakes. These can be followed by outburst floods and further debris-flow transformations. Notable examples include the 2018 Suku River event in southeastern Tibet, the 2021 Chamoli disaster in India, repeated events in the Sedongpu Basin of Tibet, the 2025 Blatten avalanche in Switzerland, and the 2026 Nepal–Tibet rock-ice avalanche and flood disaster.

== Characteristics and mechanics ==
Rock-ice avalanches differ mechanically from predominantly dry rock avalanches because the ice component can melt during movement. Melting transfers material from the solid to the fluid phase and can produce meltwater that contributes to basal lubrication, while interactions between the granular and fluid components can promote internal fluidisation. Two-phase and multiphase models represent rock, ice and liquid as interacting components whose mass, momentum and effective friction can change during an event.

The high mobility of rock-ice avalanches has been attributed to several interacting mechanisms, including reduced friction between particles, sliding over ice-rich basal surfaces, frictional heating and melting, increased pore-water pressure, and fluidisation of the moving mass. Mobility is commonly expressed as runout, the distance travelled from the source area, and depends on the amount and distribution of ice, water content, basal conditions and material entrainment.

Laboratory flume experiments found that increasing the ice content of tested rock-ice mixtures from 0% to 50% increased normal and shear stresses on the sliding surface while decreasing the friction coefficient. The experiments also found that freezing effects reduced particle collisions and energy dissipation, and that the resulting mechanical changes increased the ability of the moving mass to scrape material from the flow path and transport it into a river channel.

Rock and ice particles can also segregate during movement, producing spatial differences in composition and flow behaviour. Numerical modelling indicates that differences in particle properties and contact interactions can produce segregation and changes in flow regime, with the distribution of rock and ice influencing the balance between collisional and frictional stresses.

Thermomechanical models account for frictional heating, melting, phase changes and entrainment because these processes alter the material composition and mechanical state of the moving mass. Such models represent rock, ice, snow and water as interacting phases and can be used to examine changes in flow behaviour during an avalanche.

Seismic recordings can also be used to investigate avalanche dynamics. Analyses of rock-ice avalanches at Iliamna volcano in Alaska and at Aoraki/Mount Cook combined seismic data with numerical modelling and found that the avalanches' momentum, kinetic energy and frictional work rate correlated with features of the seismic signal, with frictional work rate correlating best with amplitude.

== Causes and triggers ==
Rock-ice avalanches develop where unstable rock slopes are associated with glaciers, ice masses, snow or permafrost. Long-term changes in these environments can alter slope stability and the conditions under which failure occurs. Glacier retreat, regional warming, permafrost degradation and changing meltwater conditions have been associated with the development of rock-ice avalanche hazards in high-mountain regions.

Glacier retreat and thinning can alter the mechanical and topographic conditions surrounding unstable slopes, while degradation of permafrost can weaken ice-containing fractures and rock masses. Increased meltwater can also affect fractured rock and the stability of slopes, although the relative importance of these processes varies between locations and events.

Immediate triggers vary between events and include heavy rainfall, rapid warming and snowmelt, freeze–thaw processes and earthquakes. In the 2018 Suku River event, meteorological evidence indicated that rapid warming and short-term heavy rainfall triggered the rock-ice avalanche.

== Flow transformations and hazard cascades ==
A rock-ice avalanche may change from an initially granular or block-rich movement into a debris avalanche and subsequently into a debris flow as fragmentation, entrainment, melting and water incorporation progress. The sequence is not uniform between events and depends on the composition of the avalanche and the availability of water and erodible material along its path.

In the Sedongpu Basin, seismic and remote-sensing analyses identified disaster-chain sequences involving rock-ice avalanche, debris avalanche and debris flow. For the 22 October 2017 event, Wang et al. identified an initial rock-ice avalanche followed by a debris-avalanche stage marked by increased collision and fragmentation, and then by a debris-flow stage associated with erosion of water-rich moraine and meltwater generated by friction between ice and debris.

A rock-ice avalanche entering a river can also block the channel and form a landslide dam, behind which a lake may develop. Subsequent overtopping or breaching can produce an outburst flood, while erosion and deposition of loose sediment downstream can cause the resulting flood to develop into a debris flow or alternate repeatedly between flood and debris-flow behaviour.

The 2018 Suku River event illustrates this type of cascade, in which an avalanche formed a barrier dam before an outburst flood underwent repeated transitions between flood and debris-flow states downstream.

== Notable events ==
=== Suku River, Tibet, 2018 ===
On 2 July 2018, a rock-ice avalanche occurred in the Suku River basin in southeastern Tibet. The approximately 3.6 million m^{3} failure transformed into a mass flow, scoured glacier and moraine material, and blocked the Suku River. The deposited material formed a barrier dam approximately 68 m high; after three days the resulting lake overtopped and breached, producing an outburst flood with a reported peak flow of 195.16 m^{3}/s. The flood subsequently alternated between flood and debris-flow states downstream, damaging dozens of houses and about 150 m of road within approximately 50 km downstream.

=== Sedongpu Basin, Tibet ===
The Sedongpu Basin in Tibet has experienced repeated rock-ice avalanche activity. Wang et al. analysed four disaster-chain events occurring on 22 October 2017, 22 March 2021, 20 September 2023 and 14 May 2024, identifying differences in their seismic signatures and in the subsequent evolution of the avalanche, debris-avalanche and debris-flow stages. The authors noted that the remote and inaccessible setting limits direct observation of these events.

=== Chamoli, India, 2021 ===
More than 200 people died or went missing on 7 February 2021 when about 27 million m^{3} of rock and glacier ice broke away from the north face of Ronti Peak in Uttarakhand, India. The resulting flow raced down the Ronti Gad, Rishiganga and Dhauliganga valleys, moving boulders over 20 m across and cutting into valley walls up to 220 m above the valley floor; two hydropower projects were severely damaged.

Air-blast modelling of the Chamoli event estimated maximum air-blast velocities exceeding 70 m/s and pressures exceeding 20 kPa in parts of the Ronti Gad valley. The study found that impacts with valley bends enhanced the air blast, whereas the later transformation of the avalanche into a debris-enriched flash flood reduced the air-blast effect.

=== Blatten, Switzerland, 2025 ===
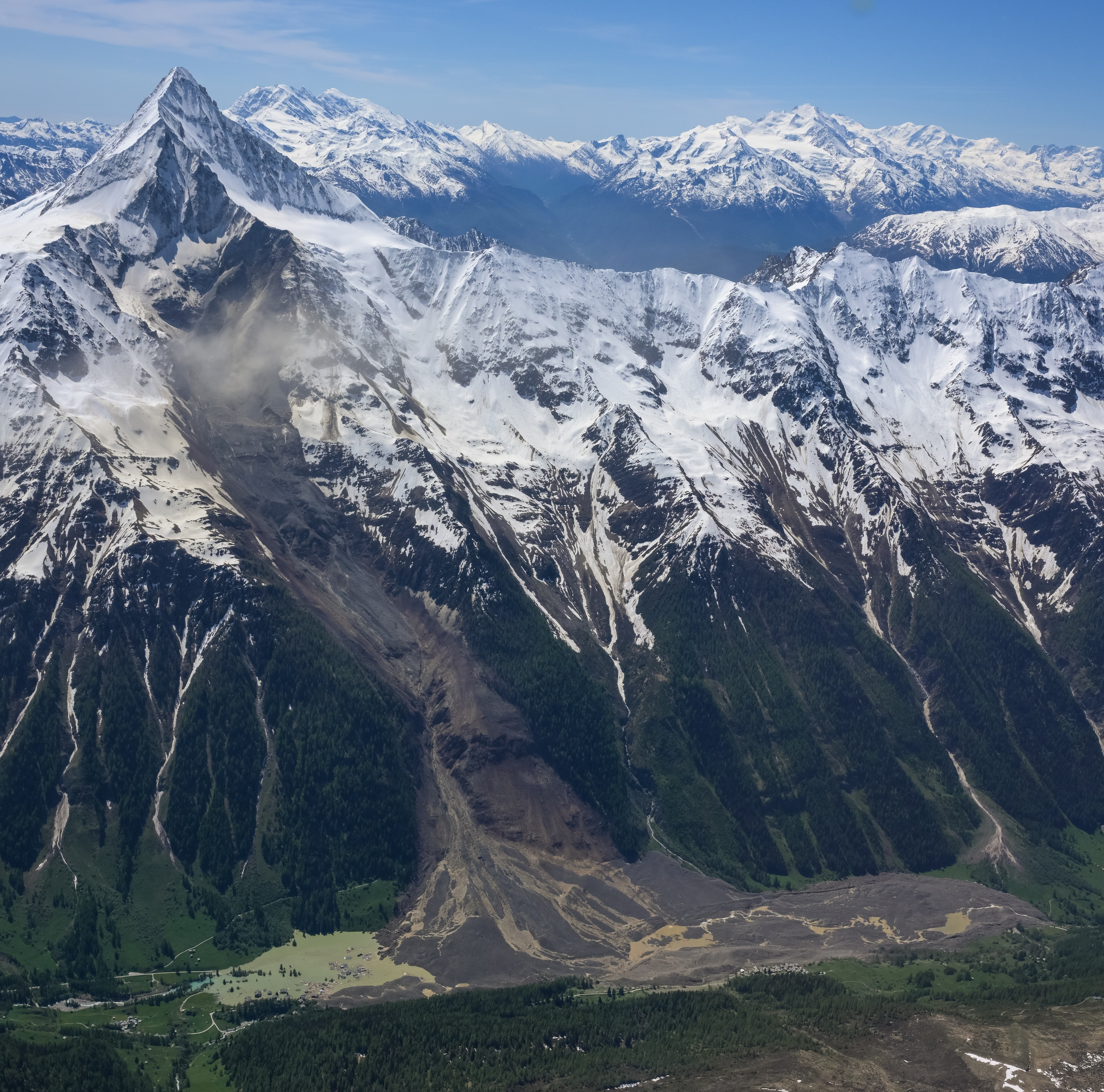
The aftermath of the 2025 Blatten rock-ice avalanche in the Swiss Alps, showing the avalanche deposit and the area inundated by the resulting lake

On 28 May 2025, a large rock-ice avalanche originated from the Birch Glacier in the Swiss Alps and severely affected the village of Blatten. A progressive rock collapse of approximately 5.5 million m^{3} onto the glacier preceded the sudden release of approximately 8.3 million m^{3} of mixed rock and ice debris. The resulting avalanche exceeded 50 m/s, travelled 4.2 km, generated powerful air blasts and formed a barrier lake that inundated houses in Blatten.

=== Rasuwa, Nepal, 2026 ===
On 26 August 2026, a major rock-ice avalanche occurred in the upper Bhotekoshi watershed near the Nepal–China border. The failed mass entrained loose sediment and water as it descended into the Lhende River, developing into a highly mobile debris flow and flood that travelled through the Bhote Koshi and Trishuli river systems for nearly 100 km. The event destroyed or damaged settlements, roads, bridges and hydropower facilities, including infrastructure near the Rasuwagadhi border crossing.

The disaster caused an exceptionally high human toll. By 17 September, Nepal's disaster management authorities reported 1,403 recovered dead and 6,150 people still missing; search and recovery operations were continuing and the figures remained subject to revision.

== See also ==
- Rockslide
- Glacier collapse
