= Glacier collapse =

Type of natural disaster

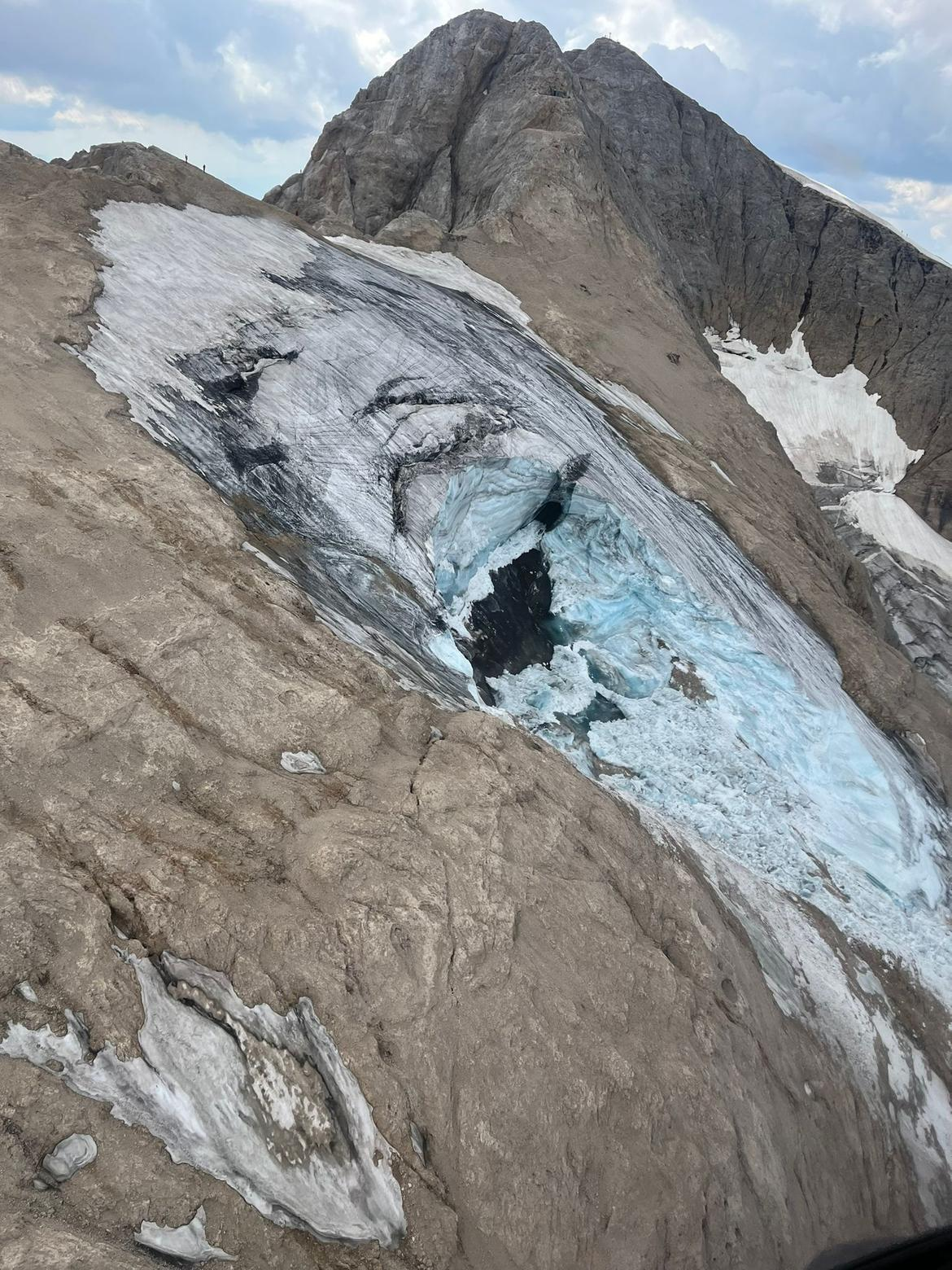
Punta Rocca glacier after the 2022 Marmolada serac collapse

Glacier collapse (also known as glacial collapse or catastrophic glacier detachment) is a variant of a landslide that occurs when a large section of a glacier breaks apart, detaches, and slides rapidly downslope. Unlike a glacial lake outburst flood (GLOF), which is the sudden release of water stored in a glacier-fed lake, or a more general landslide, where the principal failing mass is rock, soil, or debris from a hillslope, a glacier collapse involves the sudden displacement of solid ice and lithic material.

== Mechanism ==
Glacier collapse usually requires a weakened, lubricated glacier bed and a slope angle of approximately 10-20 degrees. Under these conditions, gravity is sufficient to overcome the friction between the ice and the rock bed, leading to the collapse. Additionally, the introduction of meltwater into the glacier's bed reduces the physical contact areas between the ice and the rock bed, contributing to the friction loss. After detaching, the resulting ice mass scours the surrounding rock, picking up rock fragments, basal till and other debris, creating an rock-ice avalanche that can travel extremely long distances despite the low slope angle.

== Geographic distribution ==
Glacial collapses occur in mountainous regions with steep terrain and unstable ice. The Himalayas and the Tibetan Plateau are among the areas at highest risk for glacier collapse due to their extensive glacier networks. Other areas include the European Alps, the Caucasus Mountains and areas of northern Canada and Alaska.

== Hazards and impacts ==
The rapid descent of debris can trigger secondary hazards, especially to populated areas downslope from the collapse, such as flash flooding, debris flows, and tsunamis. In populated areas, flows can cause damage to homes, roads, bridges, and other infrastructure. The rapid nature of the resulting flows also create the risk of death and injuries as the population may not have sufficient time to vacate the flow's path. In addition to the direct danger posed to populated areas by the moving ice and rock, the flows can dam nearby rivers, or create lake displacements if they enter a body of water.

== Examples ==
Some of these events are referred to as avalanches or landslides, but are more accurately described as glacier collapses.

- 1970 Huascarán debris avalanche
- 2002 Kolka–Karmadon rock ice slide
- 2021 Uttarakhand flood
- 2022 Marmolada serac collapse
- 2023 Greenland landslide
- 2025 Blatten glacier collapse
- 2026 Nepal floods

== See also ==
- Rock-ice avalanche
