= 2025 Blatten glacier collapse =

Natural disaster in Switzerland

Coordinates: 46°24′16″N 7°50′10″E

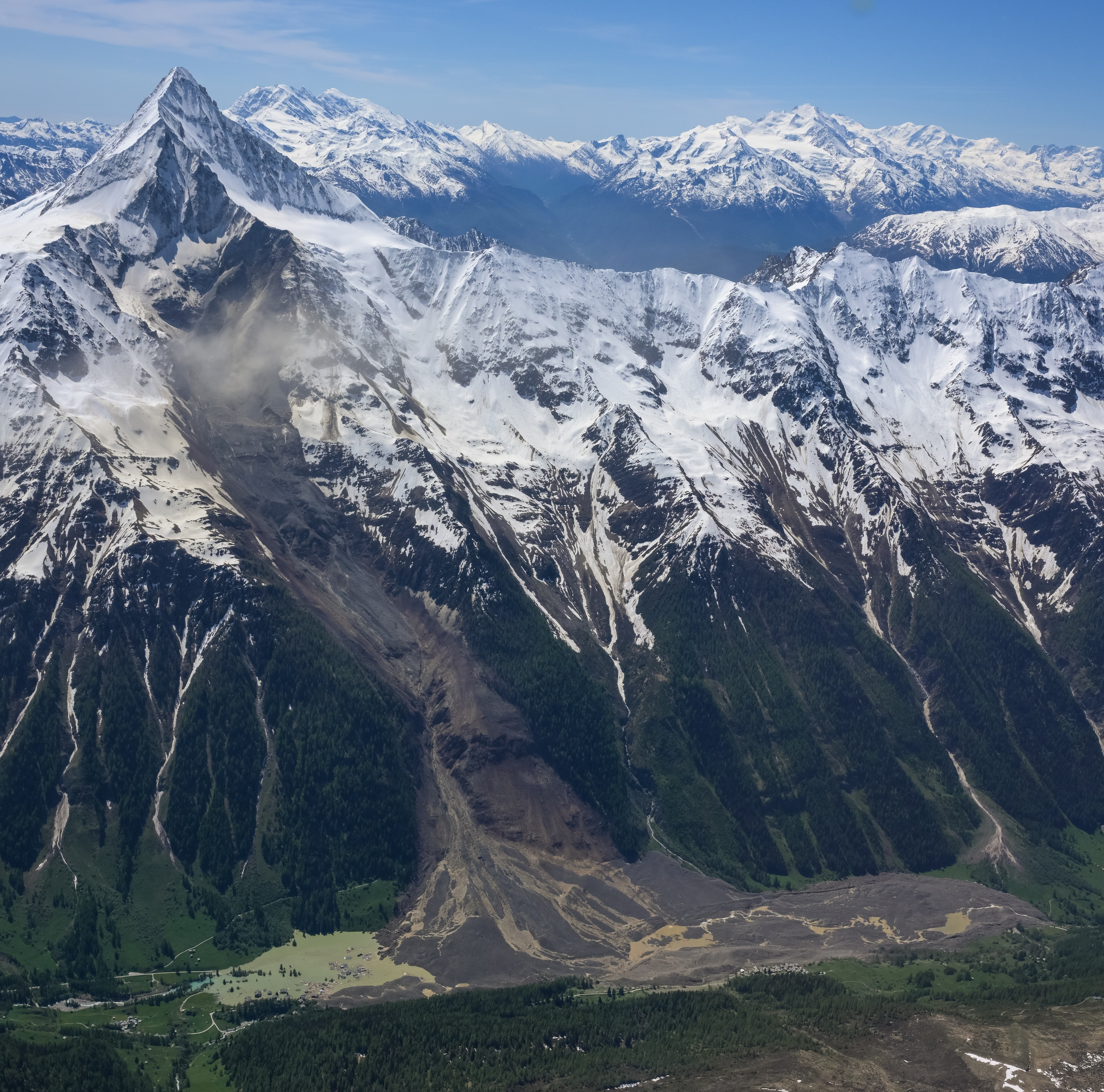
The Lötschental near Blatten on 30 May 2025 after the landslide

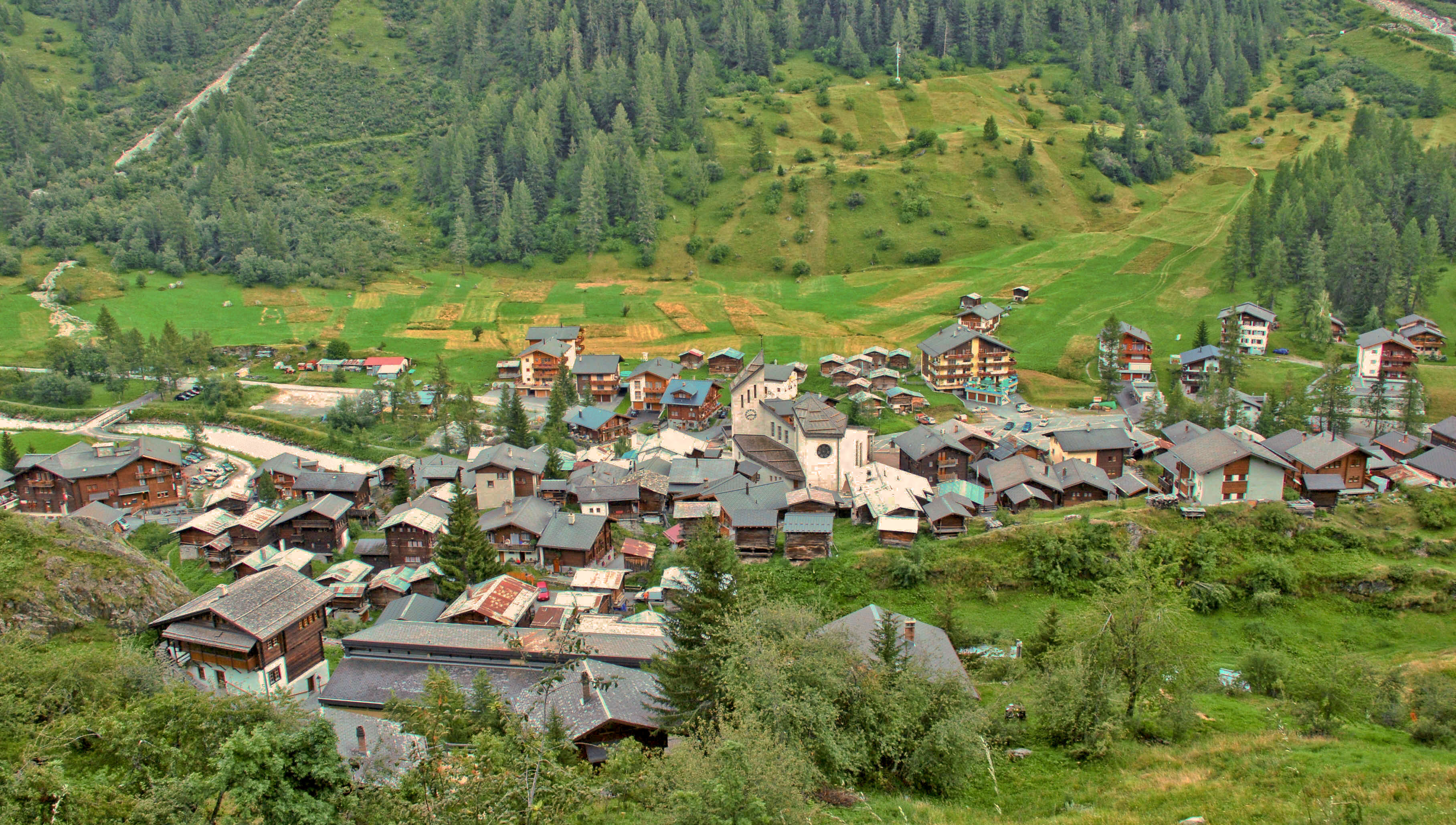
Blatten (2007), view from the northwest. The ice and debris masses originated from the Bergbach, visible top right, and moved far up the opposite slope (from where the photo was taken). Several houses near the bridge visible on the left initially survived the disaster but sank into the rapidly forming lake the following day.

The Blatten Landslide was a natural disaster that occurred on 28 May 2025, devastating the village of Blatten in the Lötschental valley in the Canton of Valais, Switzerland. A glacier collapse in the Bietschhorn region caused a landslide which buried and destroyed large parts of the village. The main village had been evacuated on 19 May 2025. The village was largely destroyed by a debris flow and ice avalanche. A 64-year-old shepherd, who was outside the evacuation zone, died in the disaster. The event was preceded by several rockfalls and landslides from the Bietschhorn area onto the Birch Glacier, which ultimately collapsed under the additional burden of millions of cubic metres of debris.

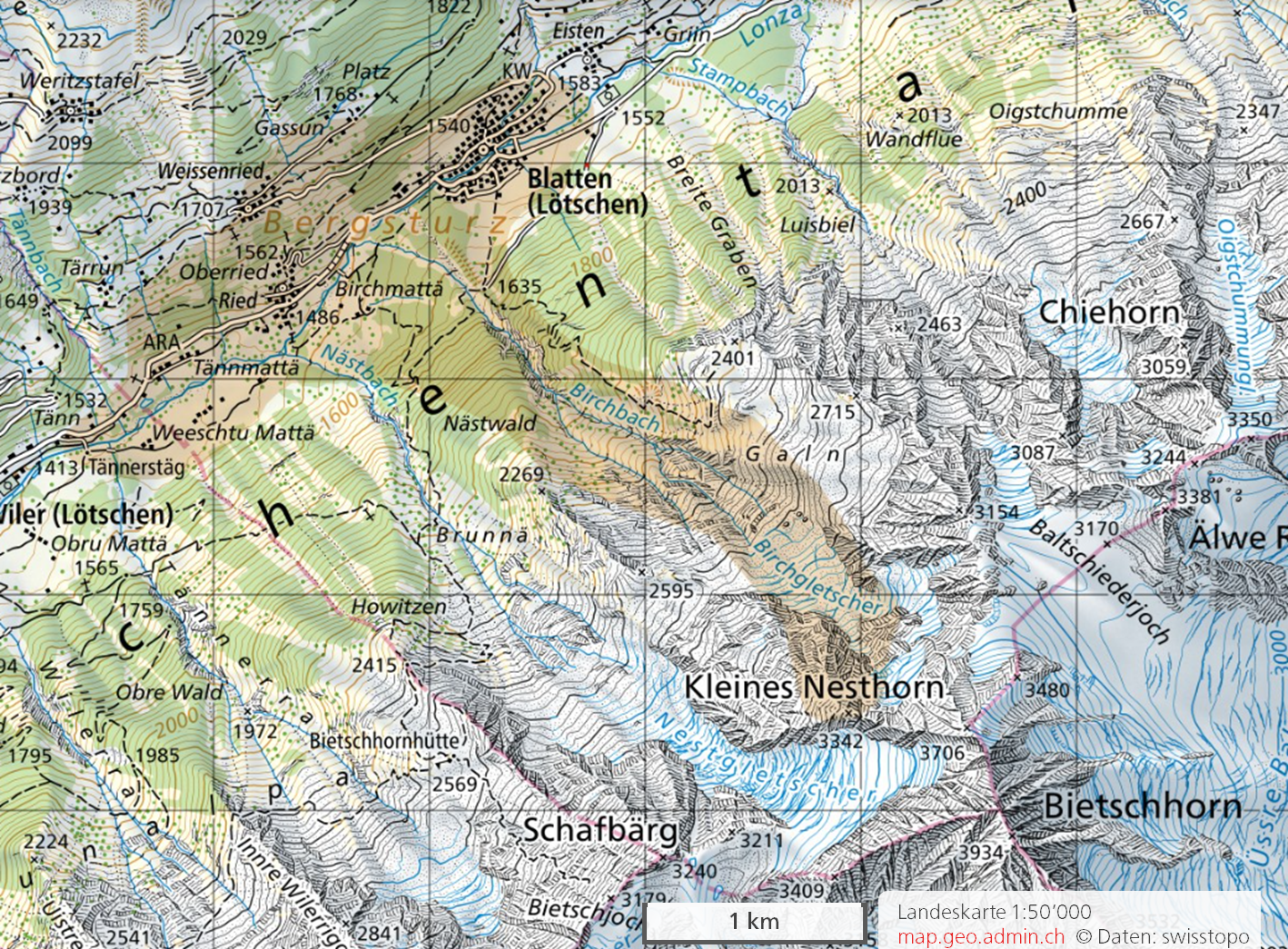
Blatten, southeast of it the Kleines Nesthorn, and the Birchgletscher in between (2023 map)

The failure was preceded by progressive seismic precursors, which were detected through unsupervised machine learning analysis of seismic data.

== Events ==
=== Initial rockfall at Kleines Nesthorn ===
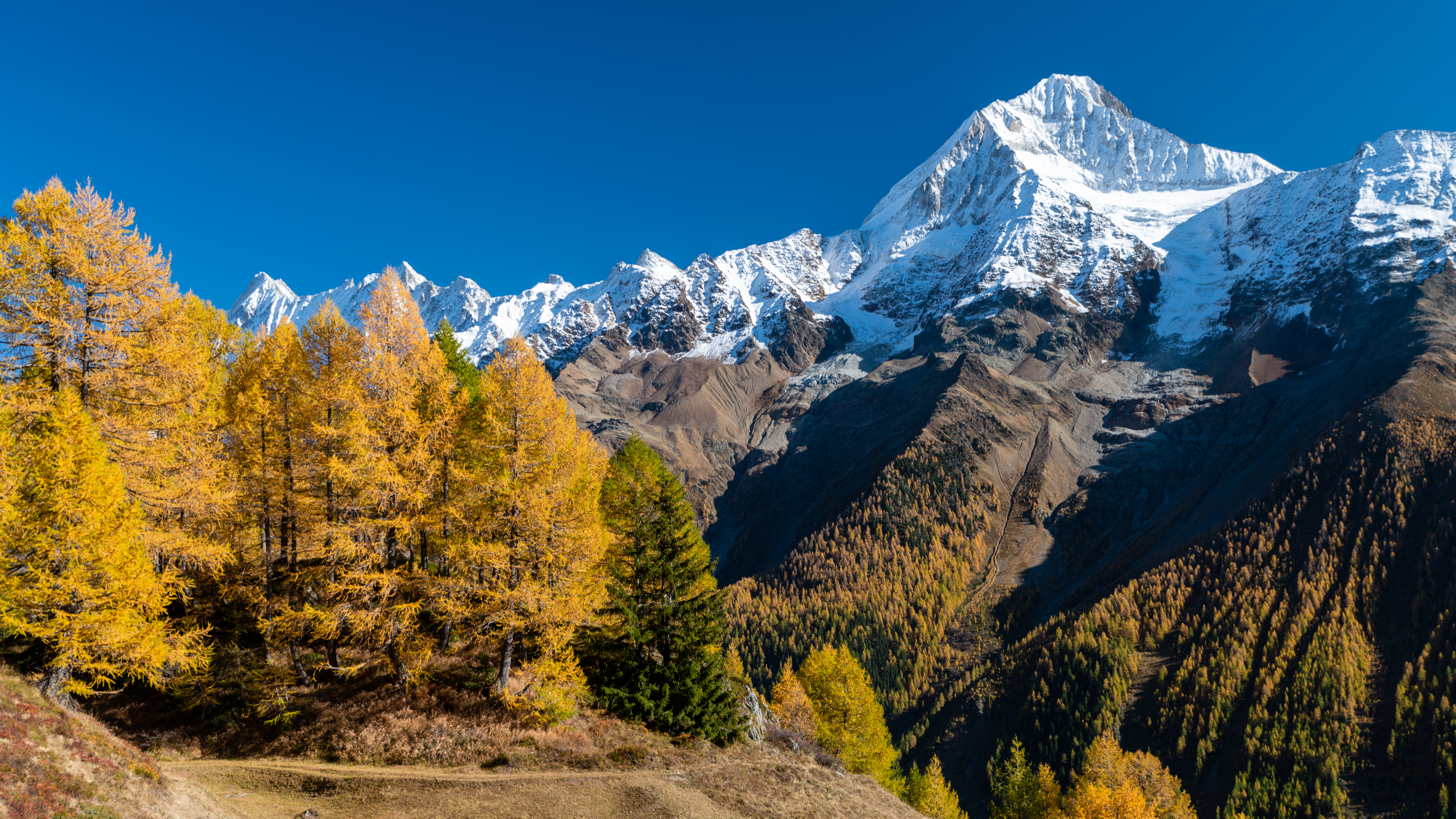
Northwest face of the Bietschhorn seen from Lötschental, with Kleines Nesthorn in front and the Birchgletscher in the center (2019)

Since around 2019, and unlike the general retreat of glaciers since 1850, the lower part of the Birch Glacier, had advanced about 50 metres in the five years prior to the landslide, likely due to accumulation of weathered rock from repeated rockfalls onto the glacier. Following a major icefall on 18 December 1993, the glacier had been placed under observation.

From 14 May 2025, signs of instability were observed on the flank of the Kleines Nesthorn. The peak is about 950 metres (3,120 ft) northwest of the Bietschhorn (3,934 m (12,907 ft)) and lies in a complex geological area of gneiss and amphibolite, subject to erosion and glacier activity. Rockfalls onto the Birch Glacier triggered a debris flow in the valley of the Birchbach, which stopped about 500 metres above the valley floor and the Lonza river. The local councilor responsible for environmental issues, Reto Kalbermatten, compared the volume to that of a smaller avalanche.

The Kleine Nesthorn (elevation before the landslide 3,342 m (10,965 ft)) consists of complex sequences of gneisses and amphibolites. It is located approximately 950 metres northwest of the Bietschhorn (3,934 m (12,907 ft)) and is tectonically sheared from its solid granite.

=== Evacuation ===
Following the debris flow, 92 people were evacuated on 17 May 2025, due to increasing rockfall risks above Blatten.

On 19 May 2025, all approximately 300 residents of the villages of Blatten and Ried were ordered to leave within two hours before noon. At this point, most livestock were also removed from the endangered area. A lame cow named Loni gained media attention as the last to be airlifted out by helicopter on 20 May. The hamlets of Weissenried and Eisten were not affected by the evacuation. The evacuation was triggered by the fact that rock formations at Kleine Nesthorn had moved 17 metres in the previous three days, and a rock collapse could no longer be ruled out. Geologists feared a collapse within hours. Eventually, the northeast flank of the mountain slid onto the Birch Glacier in several phases.

Experts used scenarios and numerical models to provide further action recommendations.

Blatten was not listed as a risk area on the Canton of Valais hazard map before the disaster. A risk area is defined as one that could be affected by natural forces with a probability of at least once in 300 years. A landslide and glacier collapse like the one on 28 May 2025, was considered an event with a significantly lower probability.

=== Glacier movement and further collapses ===
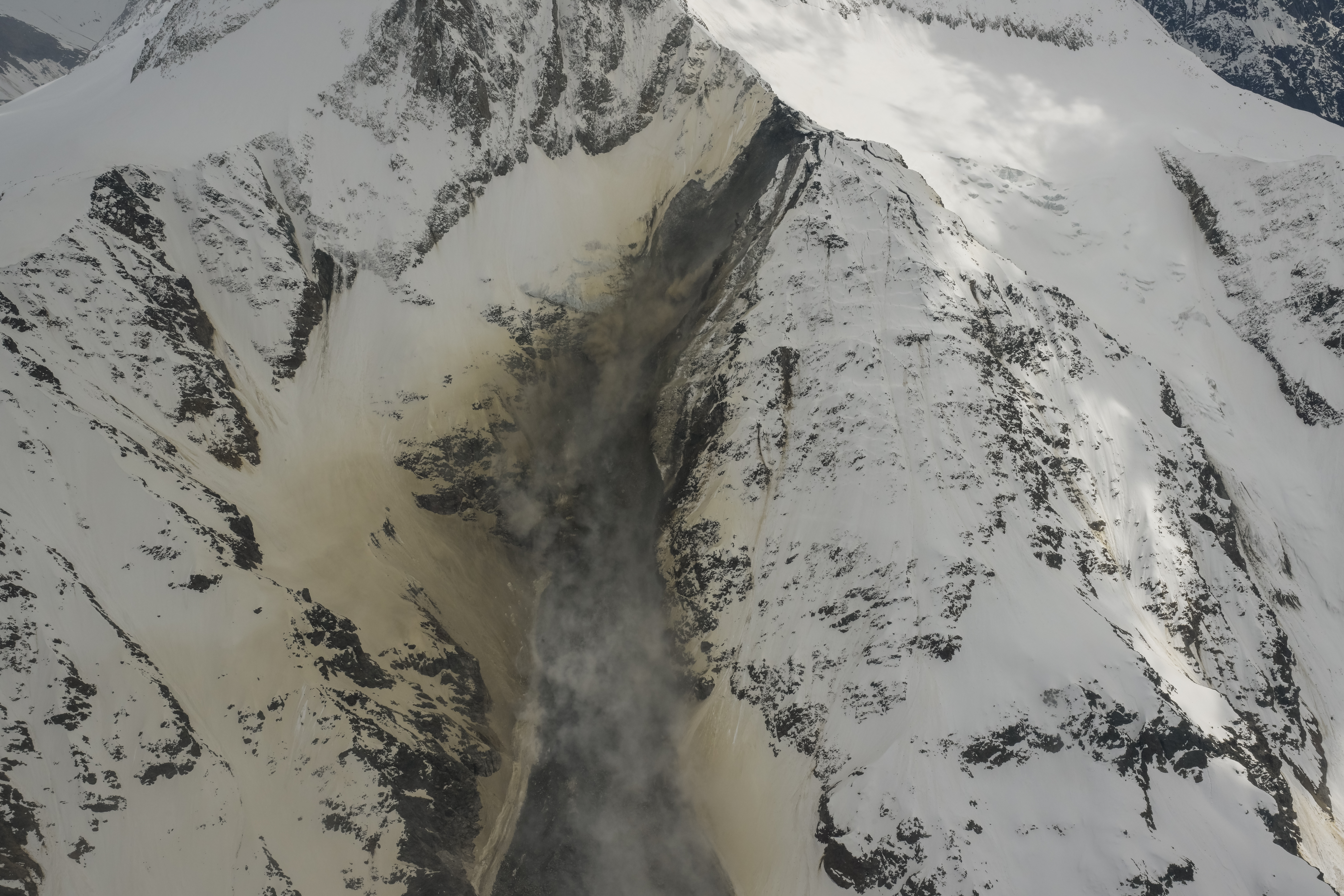
Small rockfall at Kleine Nesthorn on the afternoon of 19 May 2025. In the enlargement, the mountain's disintegration is visible.

Further collapses occurred on 19 May and 20 May, with a total of 1.5 million cubic metres of rock sliding from the northeast flank of Kleine Nesthorn downhill onto the Birch Glacier. The increased pressure caused the glacier's flow speed to rise by 21 May, reaching 0.5 to 0.8 metres per day according to a report on 22 May. Conversely, the melting and movement of the glacier at the lower part of the Nesthorn flank contributed to the instability of the steep slope there.

The Swiss Seismological Service recorded about a dozen rockfalls from 19 May, which, except for the main event on 28 May, produced tremors with an indicative magnitude mostly around 1.4, ranging between 0.3 and 1.6 on the Richter scale. Geologists estimated that up to five million cubic metres of rock could still slide.

By noon on 23 May, the debris accumulation on the Birch Glacier was still far enough from the glacier's edge that no large boulders had fallen over the edge into the valley.

The glacier's flow speed increased to 4 to 4.5 metres per day by 24 May, after an estimated two-thirds of the unstable rock formations had fallen onto the glacier. By the next day, the debris pile reached a height of 81 metres, and the glacier tongue's movement increased rapidly. By 27 May, it reached ten metres per day. Local authorities estimated that about nine million tons of debris (approximately 3.5 million m^{3}) had accumulated on the glacier surface. The additional pressure from this debris enhanced the formation of meltwater, which acted as a sliding layer between the ice and the ground, contributing to the glacier's accelerated slide toward the valley. Since 25 May, smaller parts of the glacier's edge broke off. On 27 May, larger ice collapses occurred but stopped well above the valley floor. On the morning of 28 May, an ice and debris mass reached the Lonza for the first time. Later that day, after filling the Birchbach channel, it overcame a deflection dam that previously directed normal snow avalanches from the Birchbach valley westward. The ice and debris mixture that flowed over the dam stopped above the built-up area, causing only minor damage.

=== Glacier collapse ===
On 28 May, a large part of the Birch Glacier slid under the pressure of the landslide material on the increased meltwater at the glacier's base, plunging over the cirque threshold into the Birchbach gorge. The debris and ice masses buried 130 houses and the church in Blatten, totaling about 90 percent of the village.

Roughly three million cubic metres (3,900,000 cu yd) of rock and large glacier segments fell into the valley. The seismic waves recorded at 3:24 PM were comparable in strength to those of the Bondo landslide in 2017, equivalent to an earthquake of magnitude 3.1 on the Richter scale. Seismic signals were measurable hundreds of kilometres beyond Switzerland's borders.

The volume of rock that fell with the glacier into the valley was estimated at six million cubic metres (7,800,000 cu yd), plus three million cubic metres (3,900,000 cu yd) of Birch Glacier ice, with initial estimates suggesting a total volume of 10 million cubic metres (13,000,000 cu yd).

The downstream hamlets of Ried, Oberried, and Tännmatten were also buried. The hamlet of Weissenried, located 200 metres (660 ft) above the valley floor at 1,707 m (5,600 ft) and not evacuated, was narrowly missed by the debris flow and remained largely intact. The debris flow surged up the northeast slope, stopping just short of the road from Weissenried to Gassun at approximately 1,740 m (5,710 ft). The hamlet of Eisten (1,583 m (5,194 ft)), upstream from Blatten, remained unaffected, situated on a landscape terrace above the maximum water level of the lake formed by the Lonza behind the landslide debris. The debris and ice masses covered the Lötschental valley floor over a length of about 2.5 kilometres (1.6 mi), a width of 50 to 200 metres (160 to 660 ft), and were up to several dozen metres thick, reaching 100 metres (330 ft) in some areas. The debris flow extended downstream into the municipality of Wiler, stopping in the "Tänn" area, 1 km (0.62 mi) above Wiler.

Following the landslide, a 64-year-old shepherd, tending sheep in the "Tännmattä" area, was reported missing. This location was 300 metres (980 ft) outside the evacuated zone but was still buried due to the high water content of the debris and ice avalanche. His body was found on 24 June and positively identified on 26 June. The Valais public prosecutor's office opened an investigation into the circumstances of the shepherd's death. It is believed his approximately 100 sheep perished. Many other animals on buried pastures also perished.

== Aftermath ==
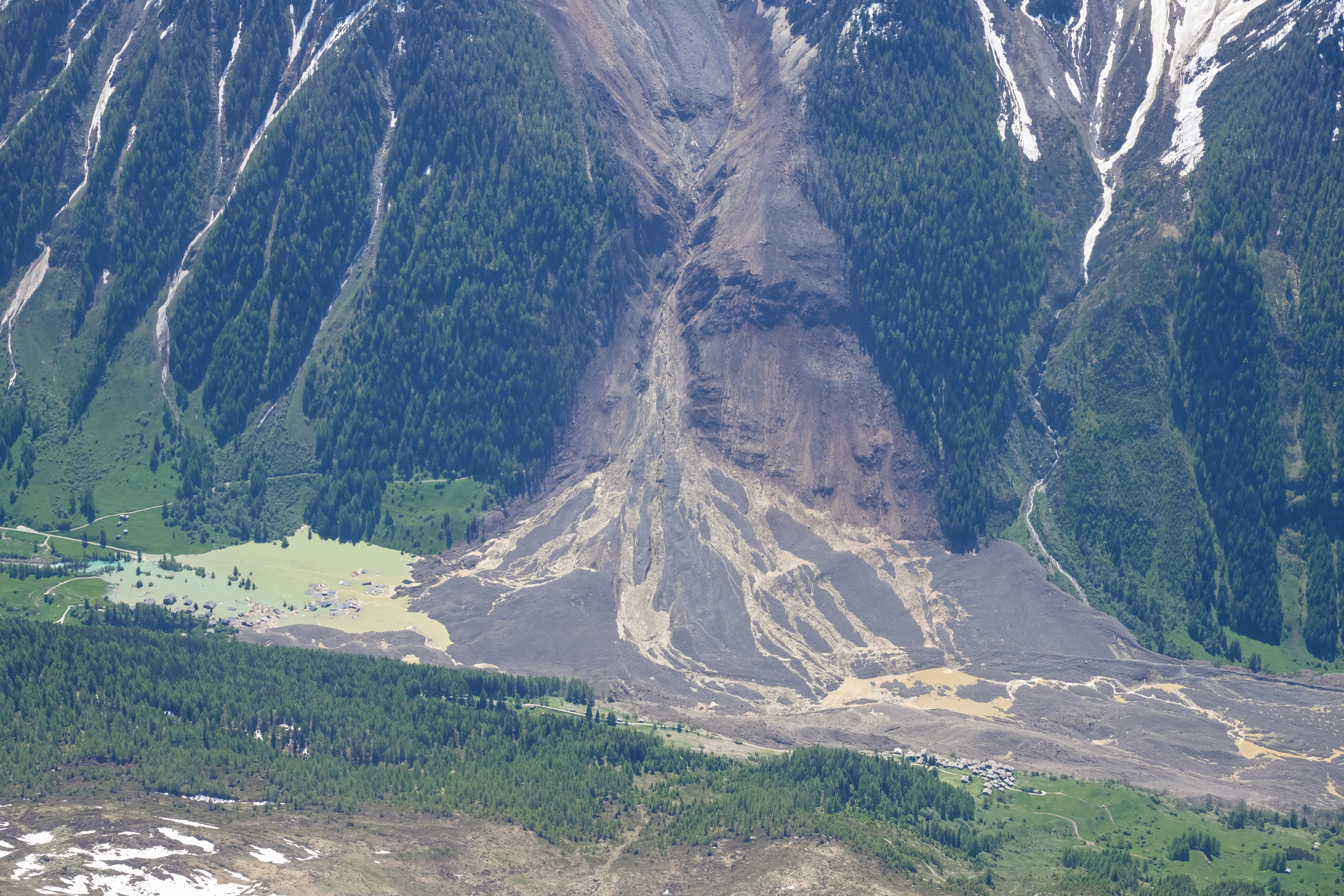
Dammed lake behind the landslide masses (image taken on 30 May 2025, looking southeast)

=== Lonza River blockage ===
Due to the deposits, the Lonza and the village stream Gisentella were dammed, forming a lake in the "Teiffu Mattä" area near Blatten. The resulting damming flooded previously undamaged houses. On 29 May, the lake level rose by about 80 centimetres (31 in) per hour. On 30 May, the lake reached a provisional maximum of one million cubic metres (1,300,000 cu yd), and the water began to carve a path through the deposits, forming small lakes in the lower debris cone. The responsible geologist for the canton described the slow drainage through the debris and ice deposits as a relatively "favourable" development. On the same day, the Lonza flowed over and through the entire length of the debris cone. By 1 June, the water level stabilized.

=== Partial evacuations in Wiler, Kippel, and Ferden ===
On 28 May at around 10:30 PM, residents of Wiler and Kippel within a danger zone along the Lonza were evacuated due to the risk of flooding. The Lonza, dammed over a length of more than two kilometres between Blatten and Wiler, threatened to uncontrollably carve a path through or overflow the debris area. By 1:00 AM on 29 May, affected individuals had to report to the respective command centers, increasing the total number of evacuees to 365. The evacuation in Wiler, Kippel, and Ferden was lifted by 6 June at 12:00 PM.

=== Further developments ===
Video of the debris cone from the Lauchernalp cable car (8 June 2025)

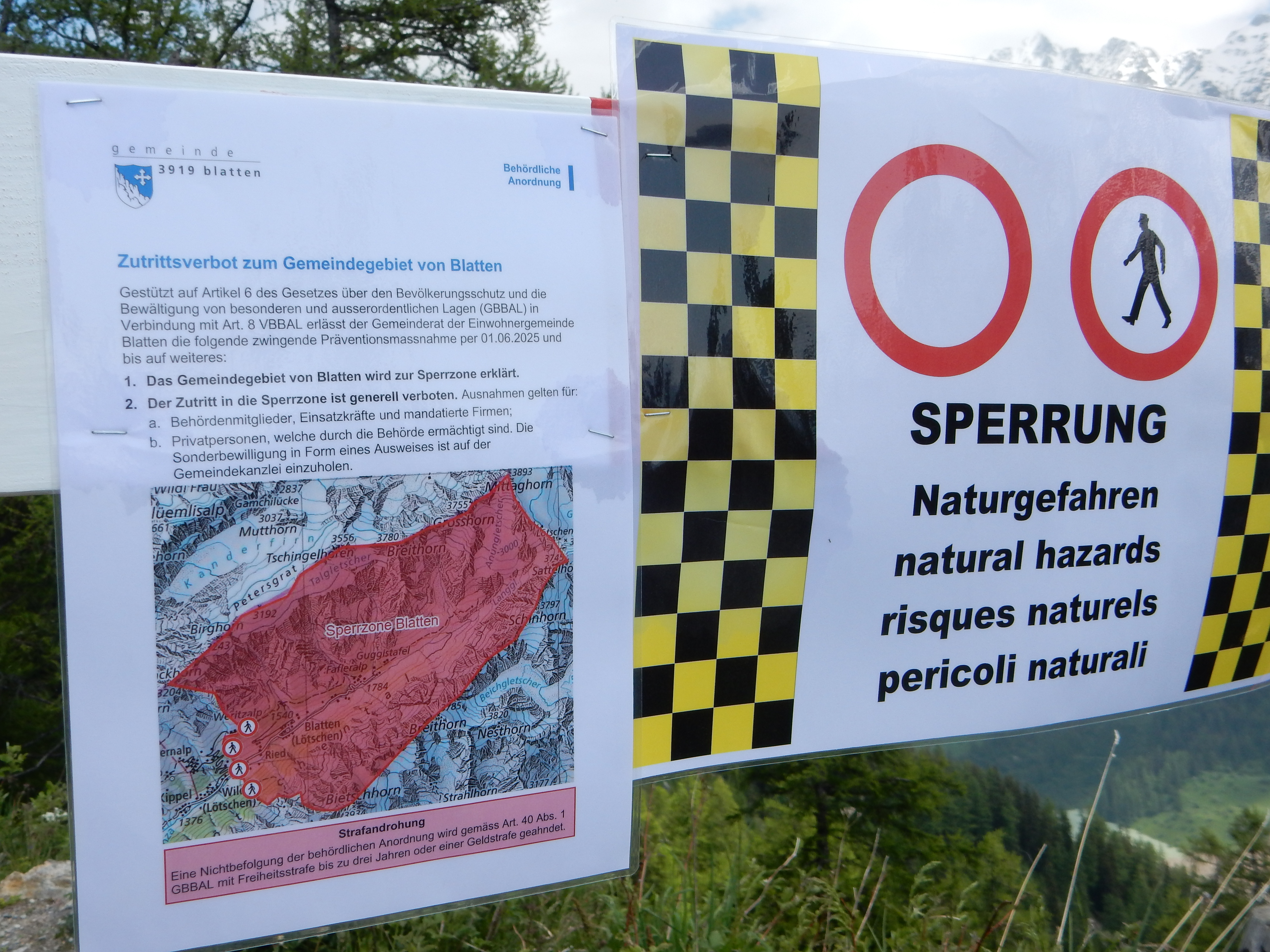
Access restriction for the entire Blatten municipality, as of 8 June 2025

Reconnaissance flights on 29 May showed that several hundred thousand cubic metres of unstable rock remained at Kleine Nesthorn, with further small rockfalls occurring. The debris masses that surged up the opposite slope also risked sliding back into the valley. The deposit mass itself was unstable, halting cleanup efforts. Thus, no attempts could be made to regulate the Lonza's flow through the landslide debris. Heavy equipment provided by the army in the Rhone Valley remained unused.

On 31 May, the debris cone remained so unstable that neither people nor machines could safely operate on it, and cleanup or regulation of the Lonza in the landslide area was postponed. Further slides from both valley sides and rockfalls remained a threat. As the Lonza slowly flowed over the debris cone and the dammed water level dropped by one metre below its maximum on 31 May, the risk of a sudden outburst of dammed water carrying large amounts of debris was temporarily reduced but still considered.

A floating barrier was placed at the Lonza's entry into the debris cone to prevent debris from clogging the channel carved by the river. Uprooted trees were retrieved by helicopter from the Lonza's riverbed to reduce debris during potential flooding. Another environmental issue could arise from spilled heating oil.

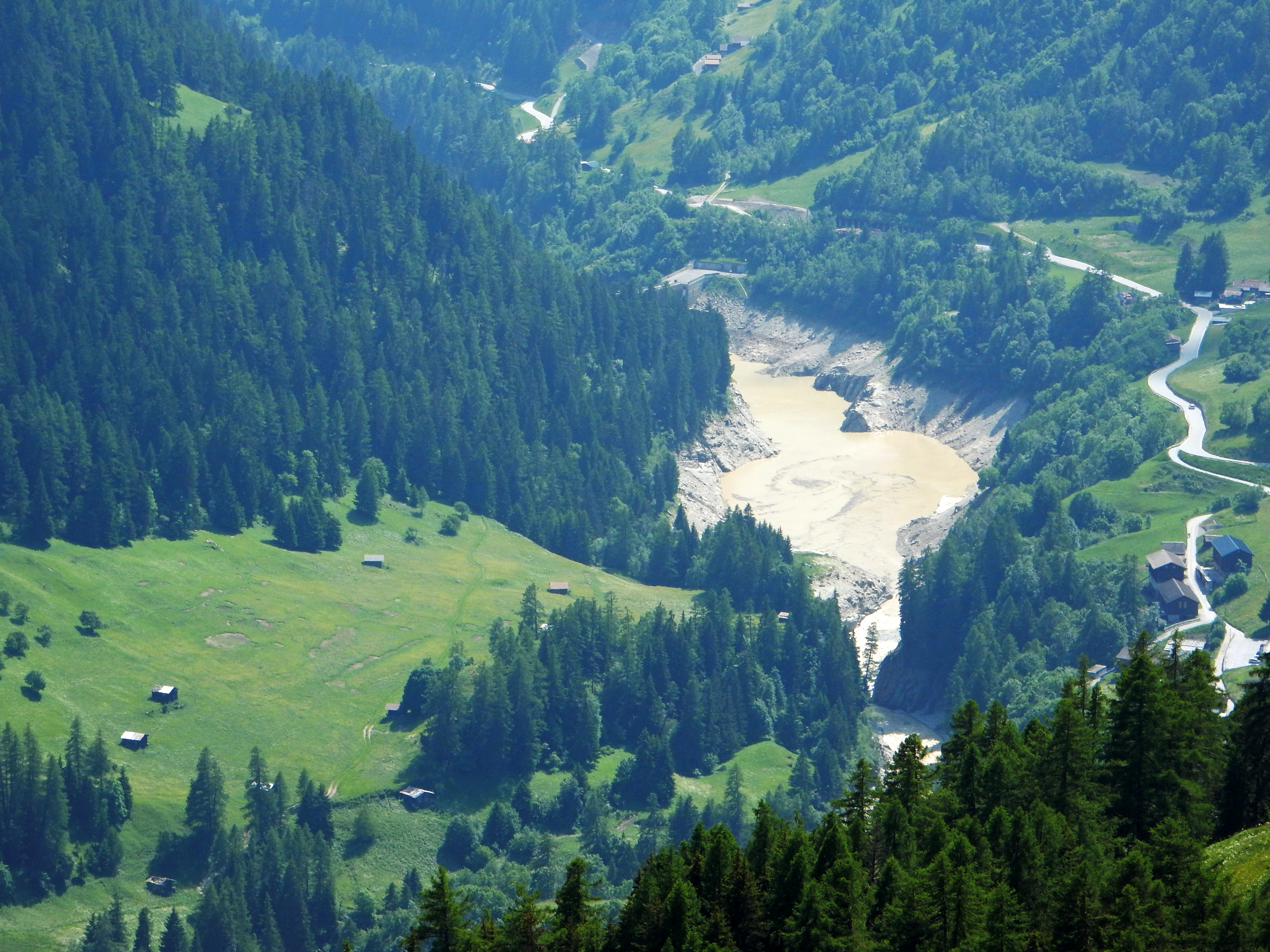
The Stausee Ferden on 8 June 2025

The downstream Stausee Ferden was preemptively drained days before the major landslide to potentially catch dammed and surging water from the landslide deposits. On 30 May, the Lonza was so contaminated with solids that power generation at the Lötschental Power Plant was halted. The Valais State Council instructed the operator to open the gatehouse of the reservoir as needed. The downstream municipalities of Gampel-Bratsch and Steg-Hohtenn prepared for potential evacuation of areas threatened by the Lonza.

Some residents, sheep, and cars in the largely intact hamlets of Weissenried, Eisten, and surrounding alpine areas, including the Fafleralp, were airlifted out on 29 May (Ascension Day), as the landslide had cut them off from the surroundings. On 31 May, the staff of the Fafleralp Hotel was evacuated. On 6 June at 11:00 PM, the road from Goppenstein to Wiler was reopened for all private traffic, making the lower part of the valley accessible again for tourism.

== Damage assessment ==
Satellite imagery timeline of the collapse

In the villages of Blatten, Ried, and Tännmatten, more than a hundred buildings were destroyed, including three hotels, the Blatten parish church, and the Ried chapel. Seven bridges and footbridges over the Lonza were buried under the debris. The cantonal road 24 from Wiler via Blatten to Fafleralp, the road from Blatten to Weissenried, and various village and field roads were covered. With the interruption of the cantonal road, access to the Eisten district and Fafleralp, and thus the Wiler-Fafleralp route of the PostBus line 591, is no longer passable.

Much agricultural land in the municipalities of Blatten and Wiler is covered with debris. This was primarily valuable valley floor grassland, which in the Lötschental is scarce and sought-after compared to the difficult-to-farm hillside areas. The Canton of Valais estimated the loss of agricultural land at 72 hectares in a preliminary assessment. Eight farms lost their buildings. The Lötschental Power Plant likely faces months to years of downtime.

The natural landscape suffered devastating damage. Around a hundred hectares of mountain forest were destroyed, with thousands of uprooted trees mixing with the landslide's ice and rock masses. An extensive grassland above Blatten and Ried, listed in 2010 as the Chruiterre Nature Reserve in the Federal Inventory of Dry Grasslands and Pastures of National Importance for its biodiversity, was completely destroyed. The two-kilometre river landscape along the Lonza between Ried and Wiler, listed since 1992 as the Tännmattu Nature Reserve and a floodplain of national importance, was covered by debris in its upper section from Wiler to the Tännbach confluence. While the lower protected floodplain was indirectly affected by suspended solids in the Lonza, the upper river landscape has been completely altered. The Lonza and its tributaries have been reshaping a new floodplain landscape since the landslide.

The Swiss Insurance Association estimated that damages from the landslide reached 320 million Swiss francs ($393 million).

Location of the debris cone (by users of OpenStreetMap)

== Reconstruction ==
A week after the landslide, construction began on a temporary relief road from Wiler to Weissenried under the regional command's direction. The State Council of the Canton of Valais announced on 4 June 2025, its intention to "release an initial amount of 10 million francs as financial aid for the residents of the Blatten municipality".

The National Council and Council of States, the two chambers of the Federal Assembly of Switzerland, unanimously approved on 20 June 2025, a financial aid package of five million francs proposed by the Federal Council as an urgent federal law. Further federal support was promised.

A working group called "Neues Blatten", established by the Blatten municipality shortly after the disaster, advocates for the village's continuation despite its near-total destruction. Rebuilding at the original site seems unrealistic due to the vast amount of debris and the impossibility of removing and relocating it. It may take years to decades for the ice in the dozens-of-metres-thick deposits to melt, keeping the debris cone permanently unstable as it shifts on the melting ice. Thus, constructing buildings or roads, even temporary ones, on the debris and ice cone is unfeasible. A road to the isolated upper Lötschental would only be viable high on the northwest valley slope. Consideration is being given to building a new settlement in a carefully assessed, hazard-safe location in the Lötschental, such as near the hamlet of Weissenried.

Reconstruction was criticized on two grounds: uncertainty and costs. According to cultural geographer Werner Bätzing, these arguments do not hold. Traditional settlements are typically located in safe areas. A 100 percent safe location is a technocratic idea that does not exist even in cities. The societal benefits would outweigh the costs. In 2006, the ETH book «Die Schweiz, ein städtebauliches Portrait» (Switzerland, an Urban Portrait) suggested abandoning mountain regions except for some tourism centers. According to Bätzing, this would lead to a loss of connection to nature, history, and tradition, applicable to all rural areas in Europe. Traditional culture contains resources for the future.

== Influence of climate change ==
Glaciologist Mylène Jacquemart from ETH Zürich noted that the role of climate change in the landslide remains unclear. Attributing an extreme event to climate change requires that the event would not have occurred, or would have happened 100 or 1,000 years later, without climate change. The relevant question from a risk management perspective is whether such events are demonstrably increasing. However, several climate change factors are detrimental to rock wall stability.

Glaciologist and emeritus professor of physical geography at the University of Zurich, co-founder of the Swiss Permafrost Monitoring Network PERMOS on permos.ch and the European project Permafrost and Climate in Europe (PACE) Wilfried Haeberli, emphasized that asking about climate change in this landslide is the wrong question. Multiple factors, such as topography, climate, and rock, are always involved. The key is to observe the frequency over time: "Between 1900 and 1980, four landslides were recorded, roughly one every twenty years. Between 1980 and 2000, there were four more, one every five years. Since 2000, eight have occurred, including Blatten, averaging about one every three years". The only correlating variable for this increase is climate warming and the associated permafrost decline in mountains. He predicts annual landslides in Switzerland. He vividly explained permafrost's role with a sandcastle analogy: "Every child knows you can't build sandcastles in a sandbox if the sand is frozen".

Geomorphologist Jan Blöthe from the University of Freiburg argued that rockfall movements from weathering are a normal process. According to Tyrolean state geologist Thomas Figl, rockfalls typically have multiple causes, including geological phenomena and, at higher altitudes, permafrost thawing, which causes rock to lose its "glue" and become unstable. The Neue Zürcher Zeitung noted that large events exceeding one million cubic metres are rare, making statistical correlations difficult, so scientists hesitate to pinpoint a cause.

Permafrost expert Christophe Lambiel from the University of Lausanne saw a link between the Birch Glacier's accelerated movement and climate change. The 500-metre-high rock wall above the Birch Glacier lies in the permafrost zone. Climate warming destabilizes the rock, and the resulting debris loads the glacier, accelerating it on the steep slope. The already fast-flowing Birch Glacier was further accelerated by the rock load and ultimately collapsed. He knows of no comparable landslide in the Alps.

According to Jan Beutel, professor of alpine cryosphere at the University of Innsbruck, extreme events occur in the context of climate change but are not always directly caused by it. Mountains become unstable and collapse due to changes in material configuration and geometry. North-facing slopes like Kleine Nesthorn's are permafrost regions. Snow provides thermal insulation, but as more precipitation falls as rain, water penetrates deeper into the rock, destabilizing it further.

The WSL Institute for Snow and Avalanche Research conducted experimental measurement campaigns in 2025 to determine the water content in sediments or landslide material using drones or ground radar, as water content, unlike purely geometric movement measurements, cannot be assessed via satellite monitoring.

== Similar events ==
- Kolka–Karmadon rock ice slide in 2002 (Russia)
- 1970 Huascarán debris avalanche in 1970 (Peru)
