= Landslide =

Natural hazard involving ground movement

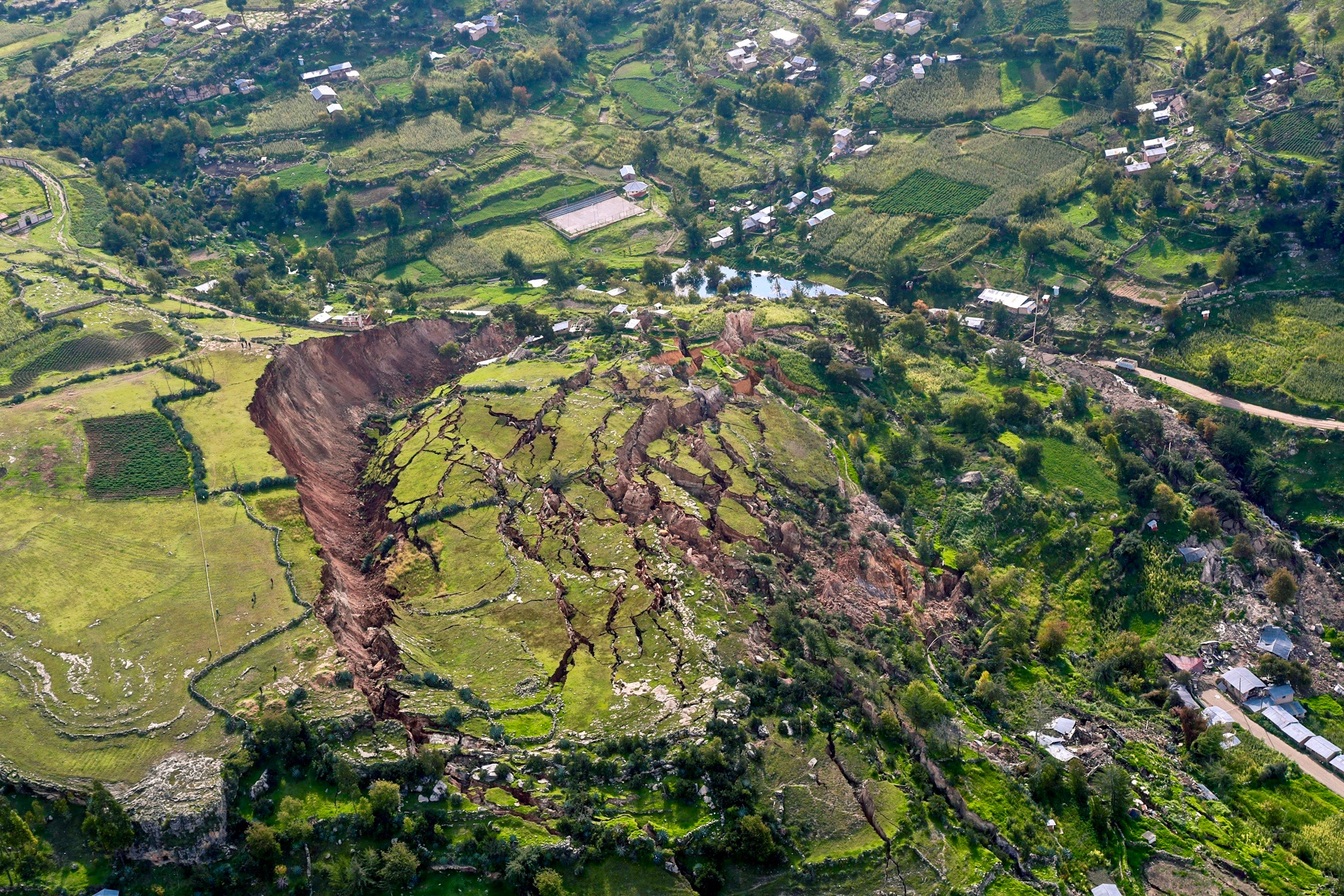
A landslide near Cusco, Peru, in 2018

A NASA model has been developed to look at how potential landslide activity is changing around the world.

Animation of a landslide in San Mateo County, California in the United States

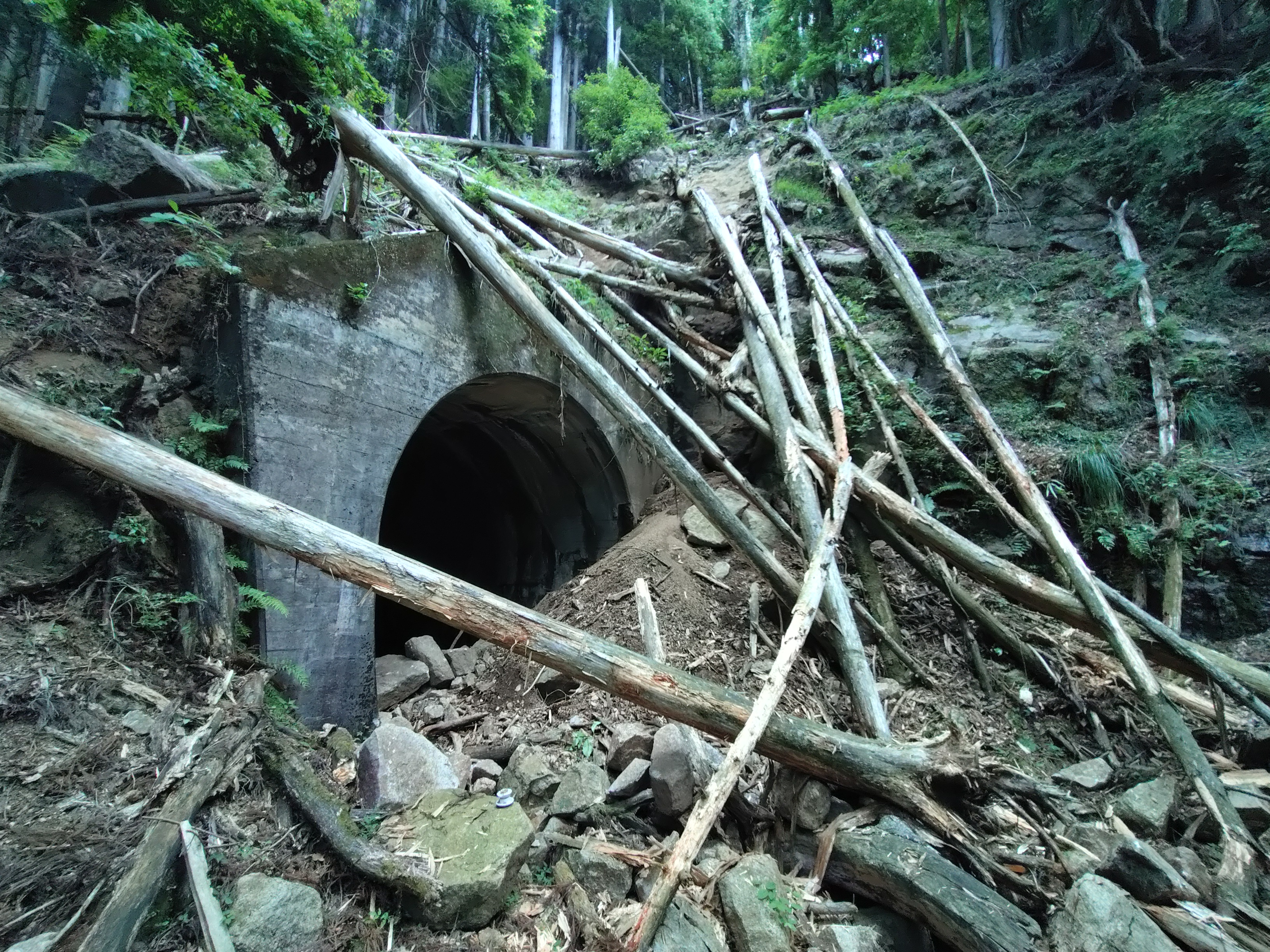
abandoned railway tunnel,Taguchi Railroad, Japan

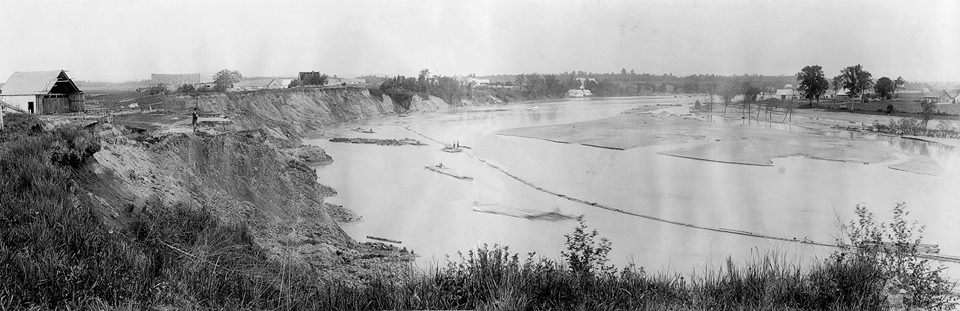
Noire River (Rivière Noire), Saint-Alban landslide 1894, Quebec, Canada

Landslides, also known as landslips, rockslips, rockfalls, mudslides, mudslips or rockslides, are several forms of mass wasting that may include a wide range of ground movements, such as rockfalls, mudflows, shallow or deep-seated slope failures and debris flows. Landslides occur in a variety of environments, characterized by either steep or gentle slope gradients, from mountain ranges to coastal cliffs or even underwater, in which case they are called submarine landslides.

Gravity is the primary driving force for a landslide to occur, but there are other factors affecting slope stability that produce specific conditions that make a slope prone to failure. In many cases, the landslide is triggered by a specific event (such as heavy rainfall, an earthquake, a slope cut to build a road, and many others), although this is not always identifiable.

Landslides are frequently made worse by human development (such as urban sprawl) and resource exploitation (such as mining and deforestation). Land degradation frequently leads to less stabilization of soil by vegetation. Additionally, global warming caused by climate change and other human impact on the environment, can increase the frequency of natural events (such as extreme weather) which trigger landslides. Landslide mitigation describes the policy and practices for reducing the risk of human impacts of landslides, reducing the risk of natural disaster.

== Causes ==
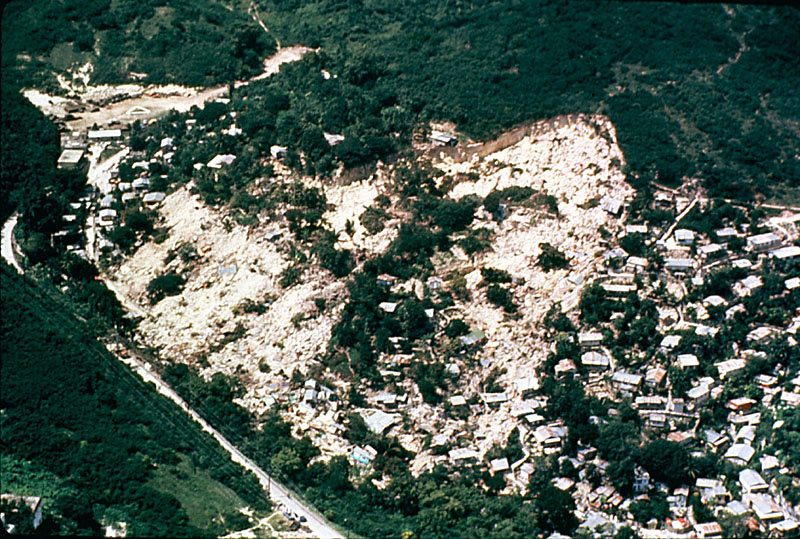
The Mameyes Landslide, in the Mameyes neighborhood of barrio Portugués Urbano in Ponce, Puerto Rico, was caused by extensive accumulation of rains and, according to some sources, lightning. It buried more than 100 homes.

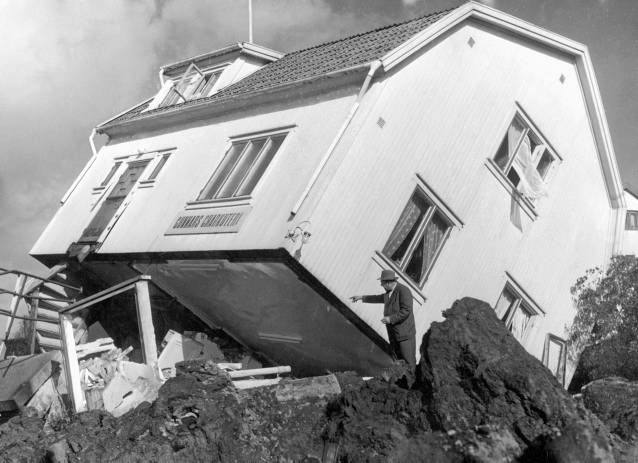
The landslide at Surte in Sweden, 1950. It was a quick clay slide that killed one person.

Landslides occur when the slope (or a portion of it) undergoes some processes that change its condition from stable to unstable. This is essentially due to a decrease in the shear strength of the slope material, an increase in the shear stress borne by the material, or a combination of the two. A change in the stability of a slope can be caused by a number of factors, acting together or alone. Natural causes of landslides include:

- increase in water content (loss of suction) or saturation by rain water infiltration, snow melting, or glaciers melting;
- rising of groundwater and increase of pore water pressure (e.g. due to aquifer recharge in rainy seasons, or by rain water infiltration);
- increase of hydrostatic pressure in cracks and fractures;
- loss or absence of vertical vegetative structure, soil nutrients, and soil structure (e.g. after a wildfire);
- erosion of the top of a slope by rivers or sea waves;
- physical and chemical weathering (e.g. by repeated freezing and thawing, heating and cooling, salt leaking in the groundwater or mineral dissolution);
- ground shaking caused by earthquakes, which can destabilize the slope directly (e.g., by inducing soil liquefaction) or weaken the material and cause movement that will eventually produce a landslide;
- volcanic eruptions;
- changes in pore fluid composition;
- changes in temperature (seasonal or induced by climate change).

Landslides are aggravated by human activities, such as:

- deforestation, cultivation and construction;
- vibrations from machinery or traffic;
- blasting and mining;
- earthwork (e.g. by altering the shape of a slope, or imposing new loads);
- in shallow soils, the removal of deep-rooted vegetation that binds colluvium to bedrock;
- agricultural or forestry activities (logging), and urbanization, which change the amount of water infiltrating the soil.
- temporal variation in land use and land cover (LULC): it includes the human abandonment of farming areas, e.g. due to the economic and social transformations which occurred in Europe after the Second World War. Land degradation and extreme rainfall can increase the frequency of erosion and landslide phenomena.

== Types ==
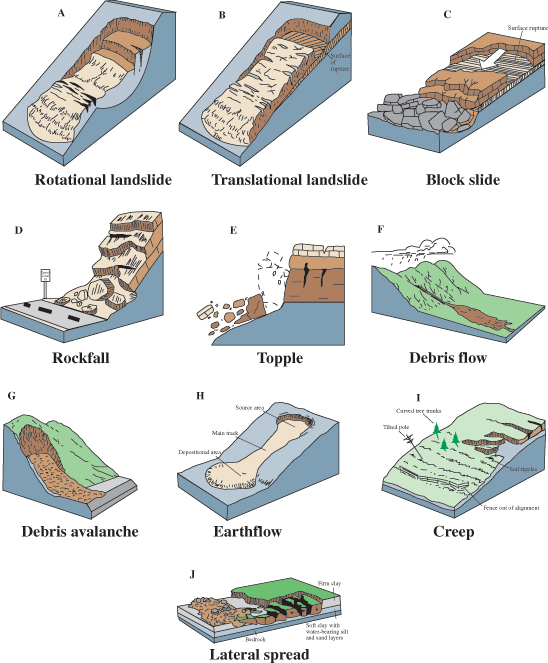
Types of landslide

=== Hungr-Leroueil-Picarelli classification ===
In traditional usage, the term landslide has at one time or another been used to cover almost all forms of mass movement of rocks and regolith at the Earth's surface. In 1978, geologist David Varnes noted this imprecise usage and proposed a new, much tighter scheme for the classification of mass movements and subsidence processes. This scheme was later modified by Cruden and Varnes in 1996, and refined by Hutchinson (1988), Hungr et al. (2001), and finally by Hungr, Leroueil and Picarelli (2014). The classification resulting from the latest update is provided below.

Type of movement	Rock	Soil
Fall	Rock/ice fall	Boulder/debris/silt fall
Topple	Rock block topple	Gravel/sand/silt topple
Topple	Rock flexural topple	Gravel/sand/silt topple
Slide	Rock rotational slide	Clay/silt rotational slide
Slide	Rock planar slide	Clay/silt planar slide
Slide	Rock wedge slide	Gravel/sand/debris slide
Slide	Rock compound slide	Clay/silt compound slide
Slide	Rock irregular slide	Clay/silt compound slide
Spread	Rock slope spread	Sand/silt liquefaction spread
Spread	Rock slope spread	Sensitive clay spread
Flow	Rock/ice avalanche	Sand/silt/debris dry flow
Flow	Rock/ice avalanche	Sand/silt/debris flowslide
Flow	Rock/ice avalanche	Sensitive clay flowslide
Flow	Rock/ice avalanche	Debris flow
Flow	Rock/ice avalanche	Mud flow
Flow	Rock/ice avalanche	Debris flood
Flow	Rock/ice avalanche	Debris avalanche
Flow	Rock/ice avalanche	Earthflow
Flow	Rock/ice avalanche	Peat flow
Slope deformation	Mountain slope deformation	Soil slope deformation
Slope deformation	Rock slope deformation	Soil creep
Slope deformation	Rock slope deformation	Solifluction
Note: the words in italics are placeholders. Use only one.

Under this classification, six types of movement are recognized. Each type can be seen both in rock and in soil. A fall is a movement of isolated blocks or chunks of soil in free-fall. The term topple refers to blocks coming away by rotation from a vertical face. A slide is the movement of a body of material that generally remains intact while moving over one or several inclined surfaces or thin layers of material (also called shear zones) in which large deformations are concentrated. Slides are also sub-classified by the form of the surface(s) or shear zone(s) on which movement happens. The planes may be broadly parallel to the surface ("planar slides") or spoon-shaped ("rotational slides"). Slides can occur catastrophically, but movement on the surface can also be gradual and progressive. Spreads are a form of subsidence, in which a layer of material cracks, opens up, and expands laterally. Flows are the movement of fluidised material, which can be both dry or rich in water (such as in mud flows). Flows can move imperceptibly for years, or accelerate rapidly and cause disasters. Slope deformations are slow, distributed movements that can affect entire mountain slopes or portions of it. Some landslides are complex in the sense that they feature different movement types in different portions of the moving body, or they evolve from one movement type to another over time. For example, a landslide can initiate as a rock fall or topple and then, as the blocks disintegrate upon the impact, transform into a debris slide or flow. An avalanching effect can also be present, in which the moving mass entrains additional material along its path.

==== Flows ====
Slope material that becomes saturated with water may produce a debris flow or mud flow. However, also dry debris can exhibit flow-like movement. Flowing debris or mud may pick up trees, houses and cars, and block bridges and rivers causing flooding along its path. This phenomenon is particularly hazardous in alpine areas, where narrow gorges and steep valleys are conducive of faster flows. Debris and mud flows may initiate on the slopes or result from the fluidization of landslide material as it gains speed or incorporates further debris and water along its path. River blockages as the flow reaches a main stream can generate temporary dams. As the impoundments fail, a domino effect may be created, with a remarkable growth in the volume of the flowing mass, and in its destructive power.

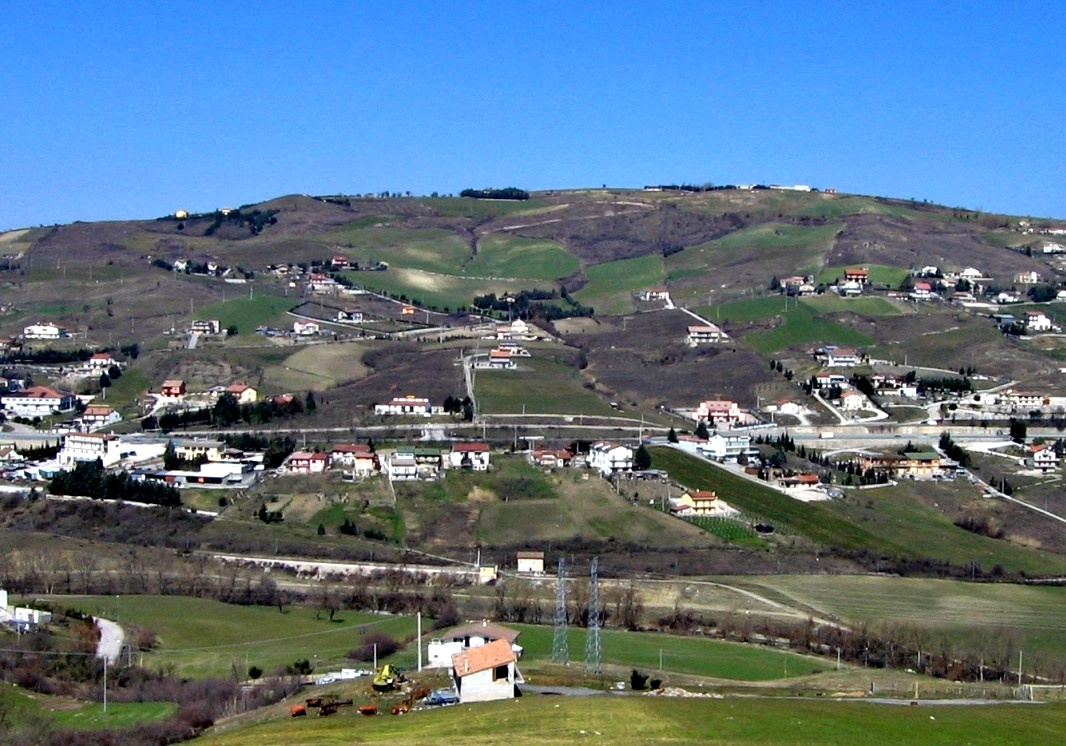
The Costa della Gaveta earthflow in Potenza, Italy. Even though it moves at a rate of just a few millimeters per year and is hardly visible, this landslide causes progressive damage to the national road, the national highway, a flyover, and several houses that are built on it.

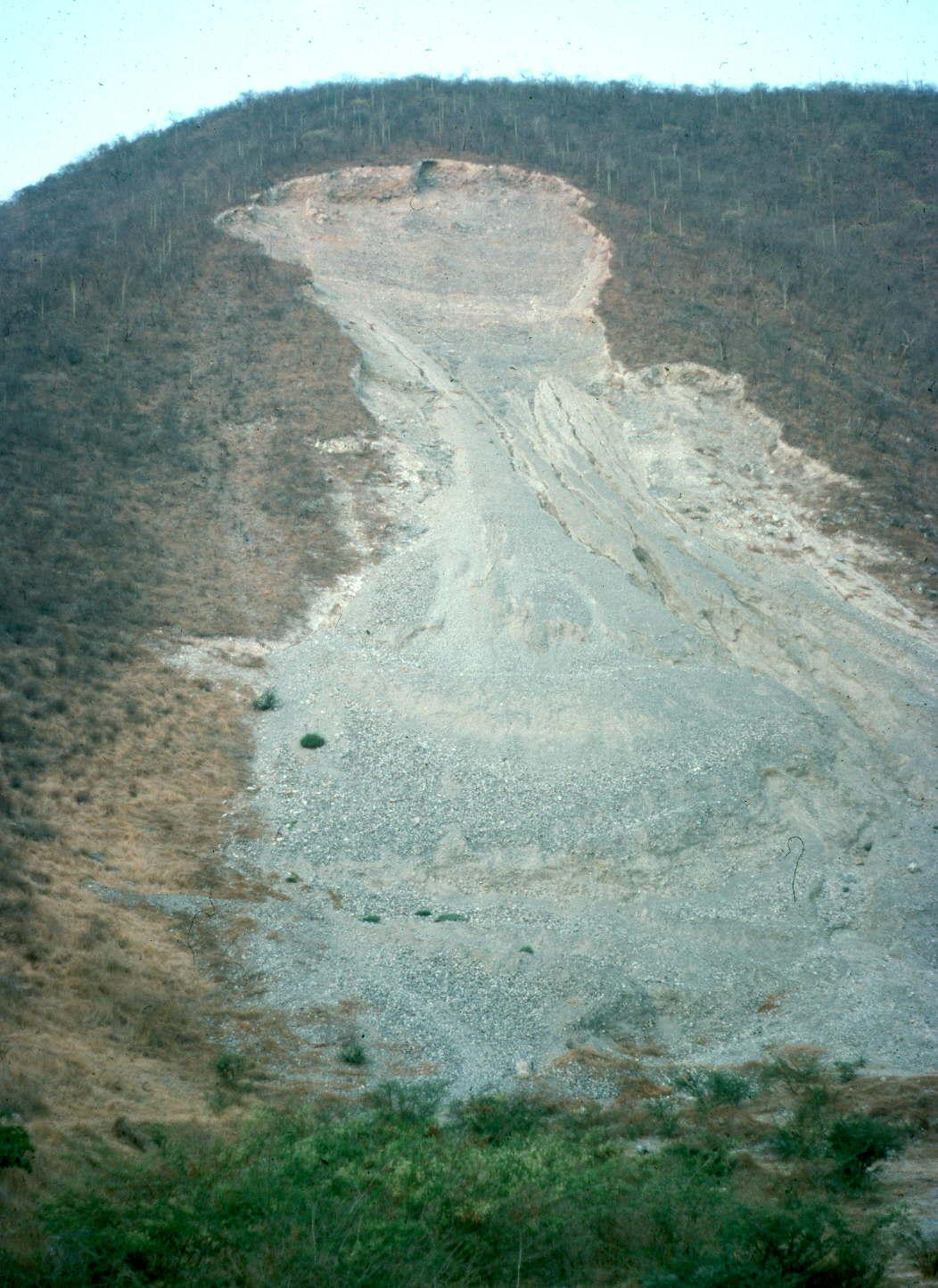
A rock slide in Guerrero, Mexico

An earthflow is the downslope movement of mostly fine-grained material. Earthflows can move at speeds within a very wide range, from as low as 1 mm/yr to many km/h. Though these are a lot like mudflows, overall they are more slow-moving and are covered with solid material carried along by the flow from within. Clay, fine sand and silt, and fine-grained, pyroclastic material are all susceptible to earthflows. These flows are usually controlled by the pore water pressures within the mass, which should be high enough to produce a low shearing resistance. On the slopes, some earthflow may be recognized by their elongated shape, with one or more lobes at their toes. As these lobes spread out, drainage of the mass increases and the margins dry out, lowering the overall velocity of the flow. This process also causes the flow to thicken. Earthflows occur more often during periods of high precipitation, which saturates the ground and builds up water pressures. However, earthflows that keep advancing also during dry seasons are not uncommon. Fissures may develop during the movement of clayey materials, which facilitate the intrusion of water into the moving mass and produce faster responses to precipitation.

A rock avalanche, sometimes referred to as sturzstrom, is a large and fast-moving landslide of the flow type. It is rarer than other types of landslides but it is often very destructive. It exhibits typically a long runout, flowing very far over a low-angle, flat, or even slightly uphill terrain. The mechanisms favoring the long runout can be different, but they typically result in the weakening of the sliding mass as the speed increases. The causes of this weakening are not completely understood. Especially for the largest landslides, it may involve the very quick heating of the shear zone due to friction, which may even cause the water that is present to vaporize and build up a large pressure, producing a sort of hovercraft effect. In some cases, the very high temperature may even cause some of the minerals to melt. During the movement, the rock in the shear zone may also be finely ground, producing a nanometer-size mineral powder that may act as a lubricant, reducing the resistance to motion and promoting larger speeds and longer runouts. The weakening mechanisms in large rock avalanches are similar to those occurring in seismic faults.

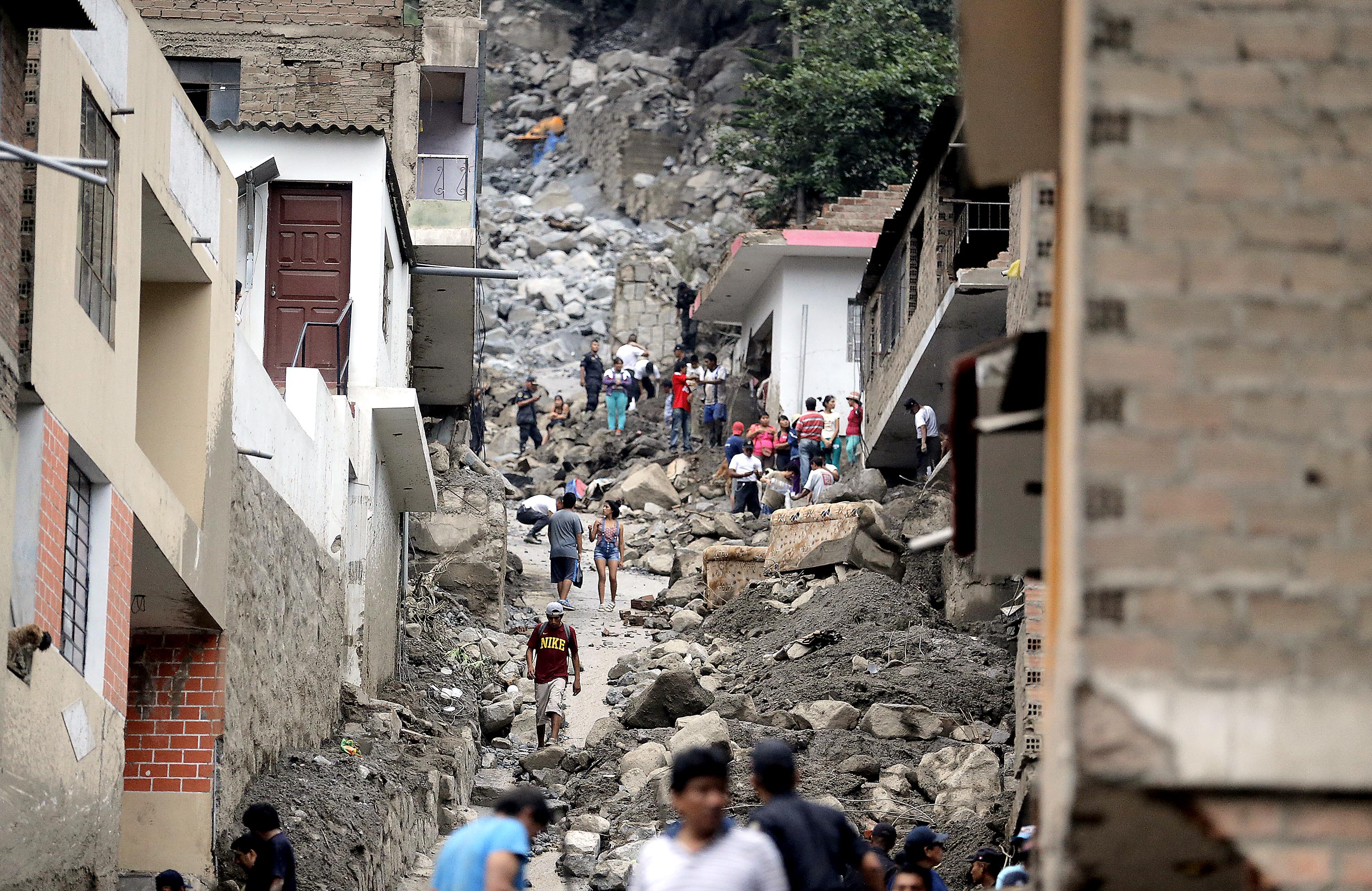
Landslide in Peru after flash flooding in 2013.

==== Slides ====
Slides can occur in any rock or soil material and are characterized by the movement of a mass over a planar or curvilinear surface or shear zone.

A debris slide is a type of slide characterized by the chaotic movement of material mixed with water and/or ice. It is usually triggered by the saturation of thickly vegetated slopes which results in an incoherent mixture of broken timber, smaller vegetation and other debris. Debris flows and avalanches differ from debris slides because their movement is fluid-like and generally much more rapid. This is usually a result of lower shear resistances and steeper slopes. Typically, debris slides start with the detachment of large rock fragments high on the slopes, which break apart as they descend.

Clay and silt slides are usually slow but can experience episodic acceleration in response to heavy rainfall or rapid snowmelt. They are often seen on gentle slopes and move over planar surfaces, such as over the underlying bedrock. Failure surfaces can also form within the clay or silt layer itself, and they usually have concave shapes, resulting in rotational slides.

=== Shallow and deep-seated landslides ===
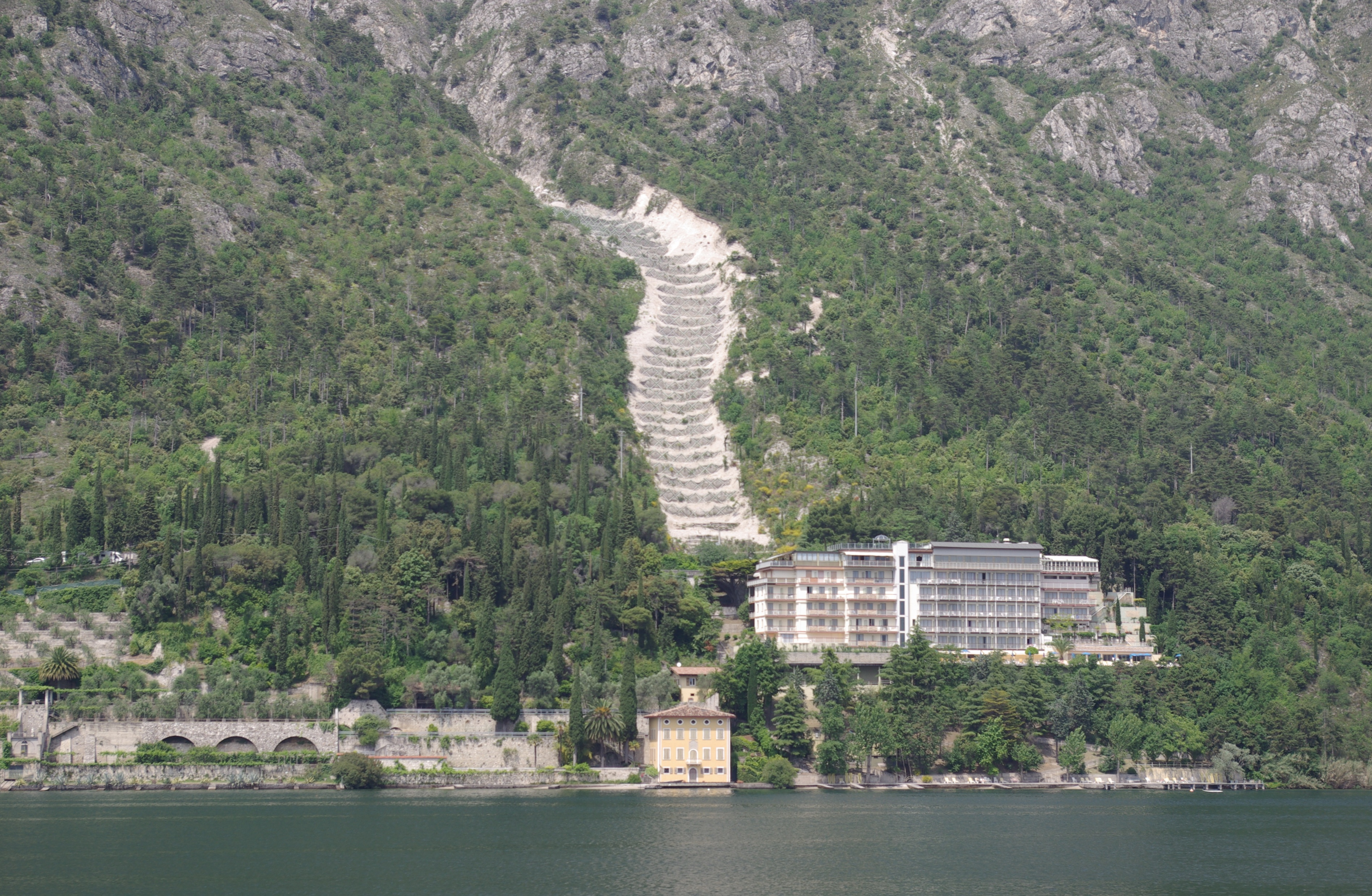
Hotel Panorama at Lake Garda. Part of a hill of Devonian shale was removed to make the road, forming a dip-slope. The upper block detached along a bedding plane and is sliding down the hill, forming a jumbled pile of rock at the toe of the slide.

Slope failure mechanisms often contain large uncertainties and could be significantly affected by heterogeneity of soil properties. A landslide in which the sliding surface is located within the soil mantle or weathered bedrock (typically to a depth from few decimeters to some meters) is called a shallow landslide. Debris slides and debris flows are usually shallow. Shallow landslides can often happen in areas that have slopes with high permeable soils on top of low permeable soils. The low permeable soil traps the water in the shallower soil generating high water pressures. As the top soil is filled with water, it can become unstable and slide downslope.

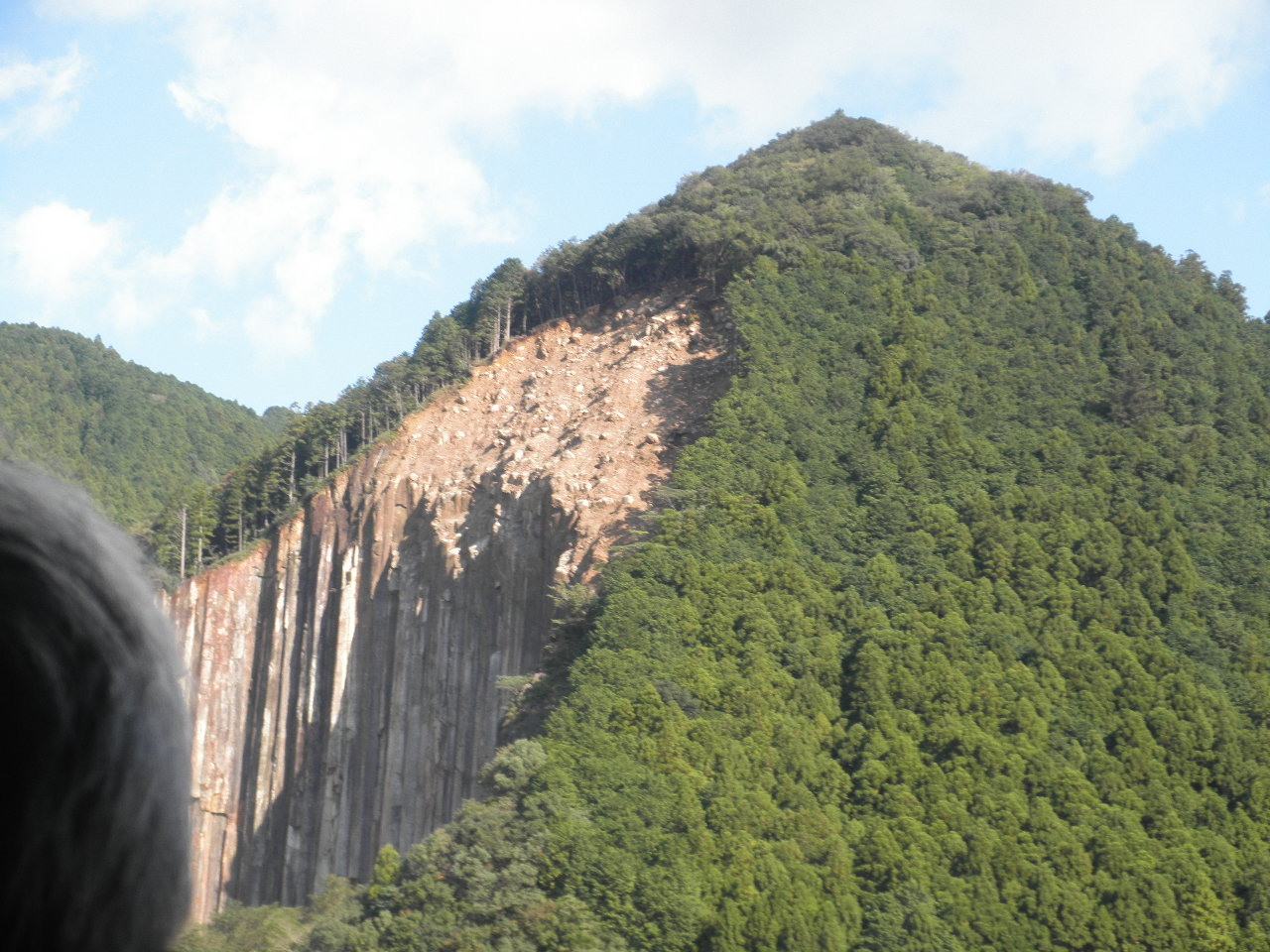
Deep-seated landslide on a mountain in Sehara, Kihō, Japan caused by torrential rain of Tropical Storm Talas

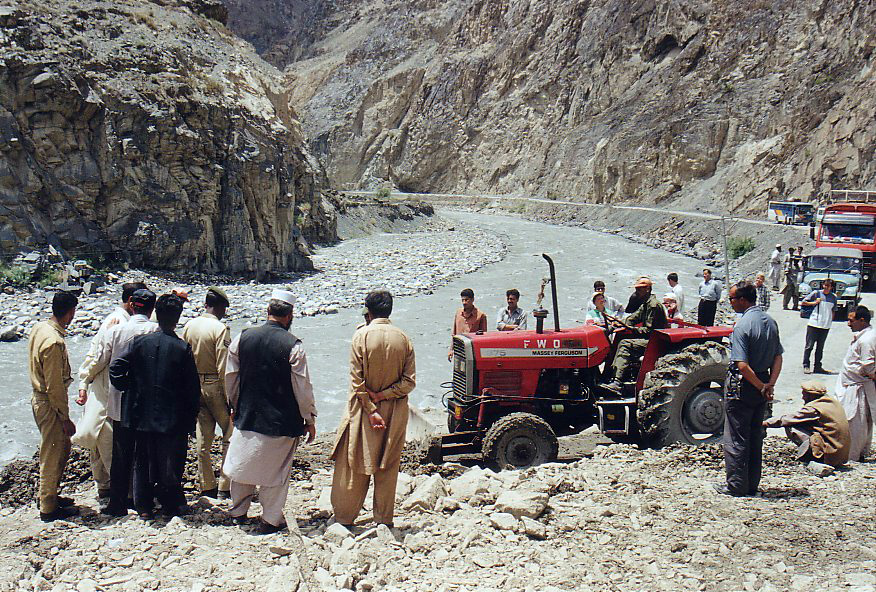
Landslide of soil and regolith in Pakistan

Deep-seated landslides are those in which the sliding surface is mostly deeply located, for instance well below the maximum rooting depth of trees. They usually involve deep regolith, weathered rock, and/or bedrock and include large slope failures associated with translational, rotational, or complex movements. They tend to form along a plane of weakness such as a fault or bedding plane. They can be visually identified by concave scarps at the top and steep areas at the toe. Deep-seated landslides also shape landscapes over geological timescales and produce sediment that strongly alters the course of fluvial streams.

== Related phenomena ==
- An avalanche, similar in mechanism to a landslide, involves a large amount of ice, snow and rock falling quickly down the side of a mountain.
- A glacier collapse is similar in mechanism to a landslide, but the primary flow material is solid ice that has detached from a glacier. It is distinct from an avalanche in that glacier collapses occur at much more gradual slope angles, typically 10-20 degrees.
- A pyroclastic flow is caused by a collapsing cloud of hot ash, gas and rocks from a volcanic explosion that moves rapidly down an erupting volcano.
- Extreme precipitation and flow can cause gully formation in flatter environments not susceptible to landslides.

=== Resulting tsunamis ===
Landslides that occur undersea, or have impact into water e.g. significant rockfall or volcanic collapse into the sea, can generate tsunamis. Massive landslides can also generate megatsunamis, which are usually hundreds of meters high. In 1958, one such tsunami occurred in Lituya Bay in Alaska, and another was triggered in Tracy Arm in Alaska in 2025.

== Landslide prediction mapping ==
Landslide hazard analysis and mapping can provide useful information for catastrophic loss reduction, and assist in the development of guidelines for sustainable land-use planning. The analysis is used to identify the factors that are related to landslides, estimate the relative contribution of factors causing slope failures, establish a relation between the factors and landslides, and to predict the landslide hazard in the future based on such a relationship. The factors that have been used for landslide hazard analysis can usually be grouped into geomorphology, geology, land use/land cover, and hydrogeology. Since many factors are considered for landslide hazard mapping, geographic information system (GIS) is an appropriate tool because it has functions of collection, storage, manipulation, display, and analysis of large amounts of spatially referenced data which can be handled fast and effectively. Cardenas reported evidence on the exhaustive use of GIS in conjunction of uncertainty modelling tools for landslide mapping. Remote sensing techniques are also highly employed for landslide hazard assessment and analysis. Before and after aerial photographs and satellite imagery are used to gather landslide characteristics, like distribution and classification, and factors like slope, lithology, and land use/land cover to be used to help predict future events. Before and after imagery also helps to reveal how the landscape changed after an event, what may have triggered the landslide, and shows the process of regeneration and recovery.

Using satellite imagery in combination with GIS and on-the-ground studies, it is possible to generate maps of likely occurrences of future landslides. Such maps should show the locations of previous events as well as clearly indicate the probable locations of future events. In general, to predict landslides, one must assume that their occurrence is determined by certain geologic factors, and that future landslides will occur under the same conditions as past events. Therefore, it is necessary to establish a relationship between the geomorphologic conditions in which the past events took place and the expected future conditions.

Natural disasters are a dramatic example of people living in conflict with the environment. Early predictions and warnings are essential for the reduction of property damage and loss of life. Because landslides occur frequently and can represent some of the most destructive forces on earth, it is imperative to have a good understanding as to what causes them and how people can either help prevent them from occurring or simply avoid them when they do occur. Sustainable land management and development is also an essential key to reducing the negative impacts felt by landslides.

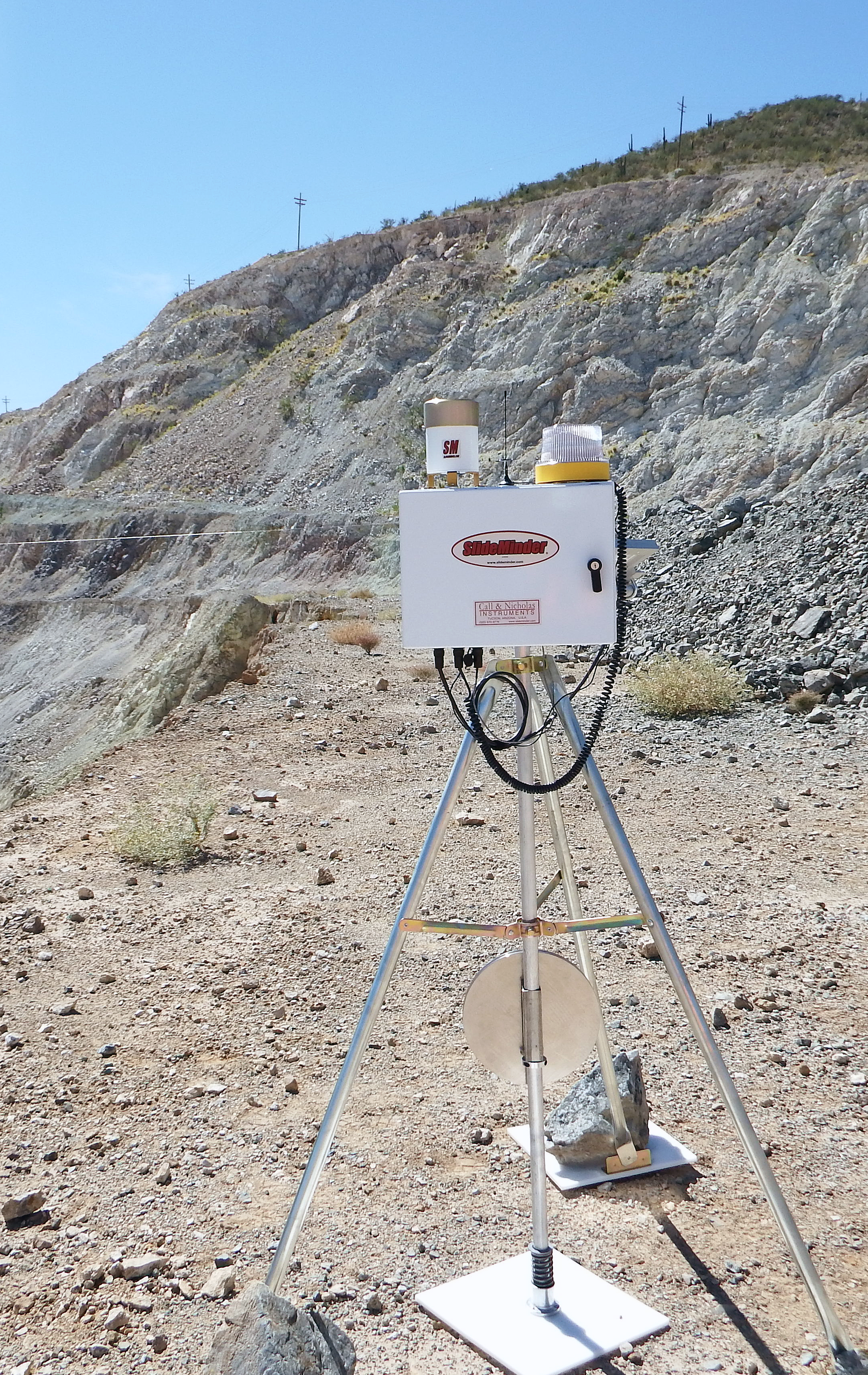
A Wireline extensometer monitoring slope displacement and transmitting data remotely via radio or Wi-Fi. In situ or strategically deployed extensometers may be used to provide early warning of a potential landslide.

GIS offers a superior method for landslide analysis because it allows one to capture, store, manipulate, analyze, and display large amounts of data quickly and effectively. Because so many variables are involved, it is important to be able to overlay the many layers of data to develop a full and accurate portrayal of what is taking place on the Earth's surface. Researchers need to know which variables are the most important factors that trigger landslides in any given location. Using GIS, extremely detailed maps can be generated to show past events and likely future events which have the potential to save lives, property, and money.

Since the '90s, GIS have been also successfully used in conjunction to decision support systems, to show on a map real-time risk evaluations based on monitoring data gathered in the area of the Val Pola disaster (Italy).

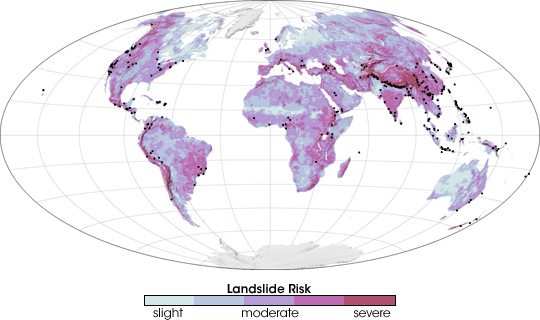
Global landslide risks

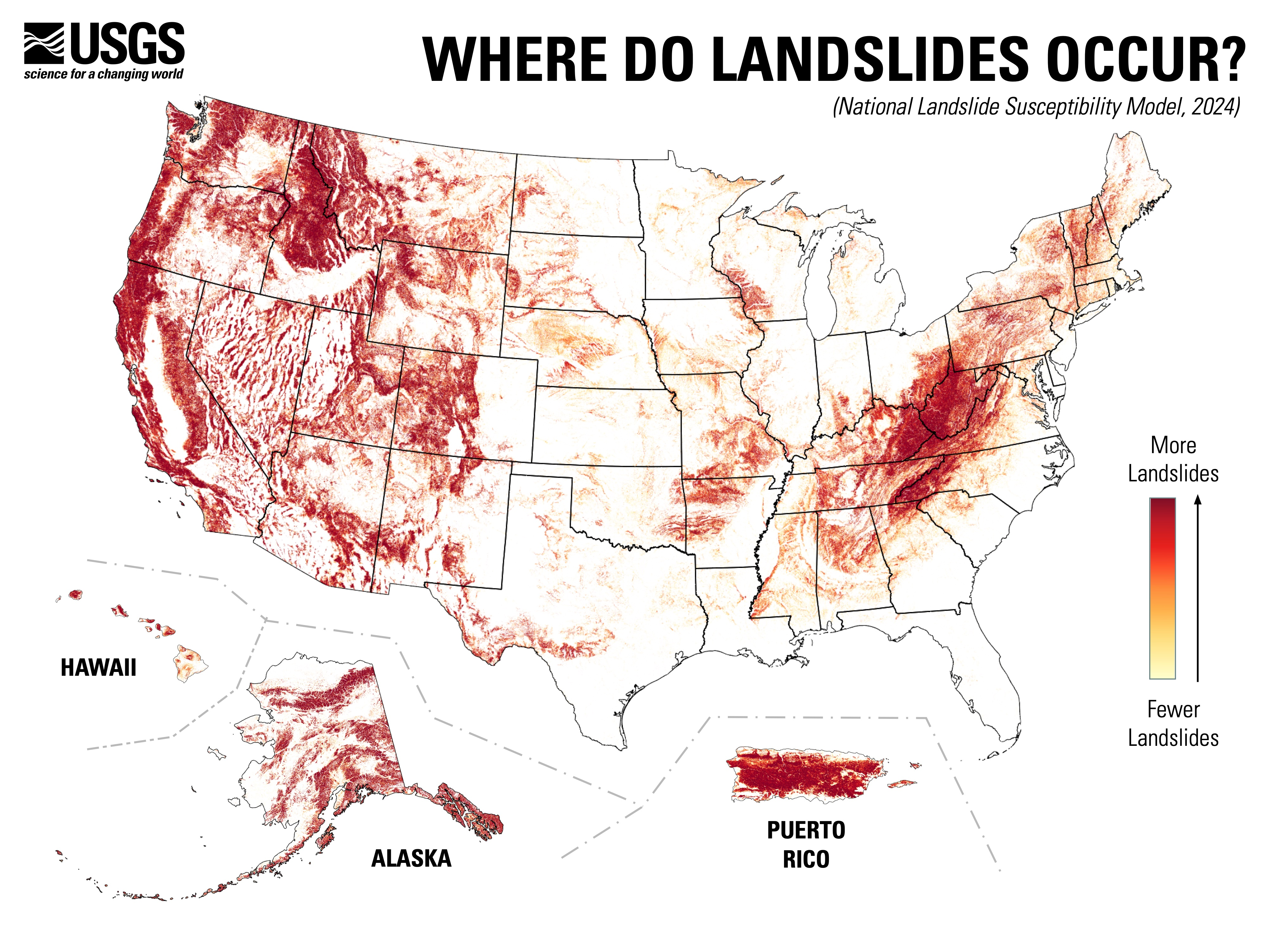
2024 United States landslide risk map

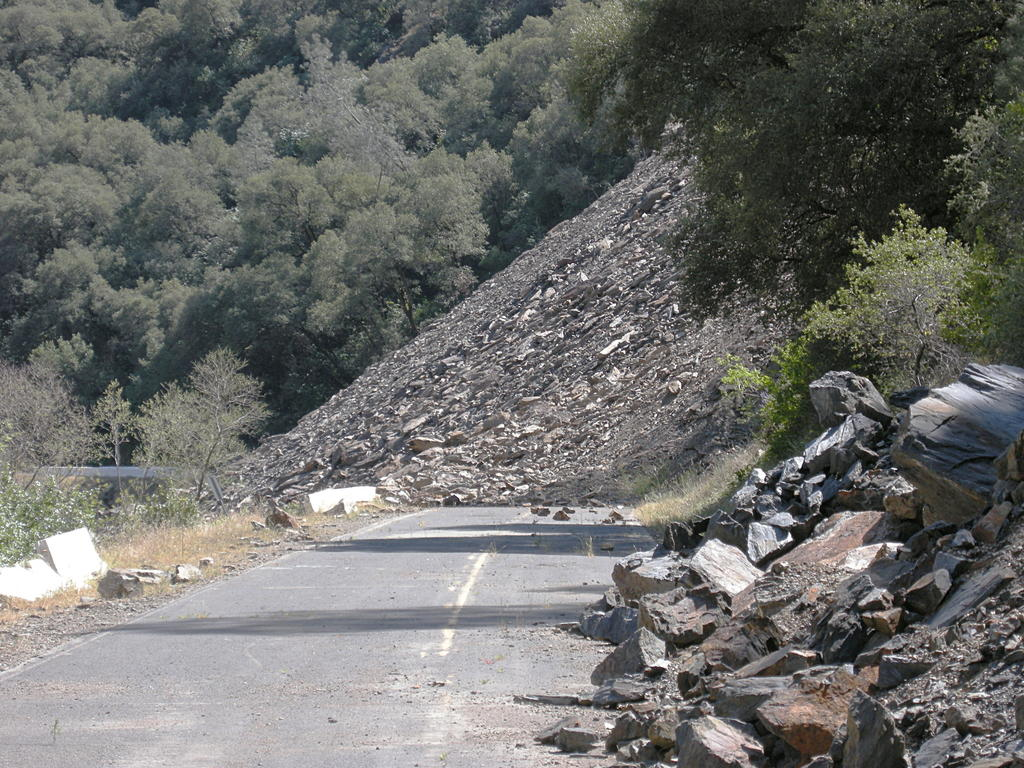
Ferguson Slide on California State Route 140 in June 2006

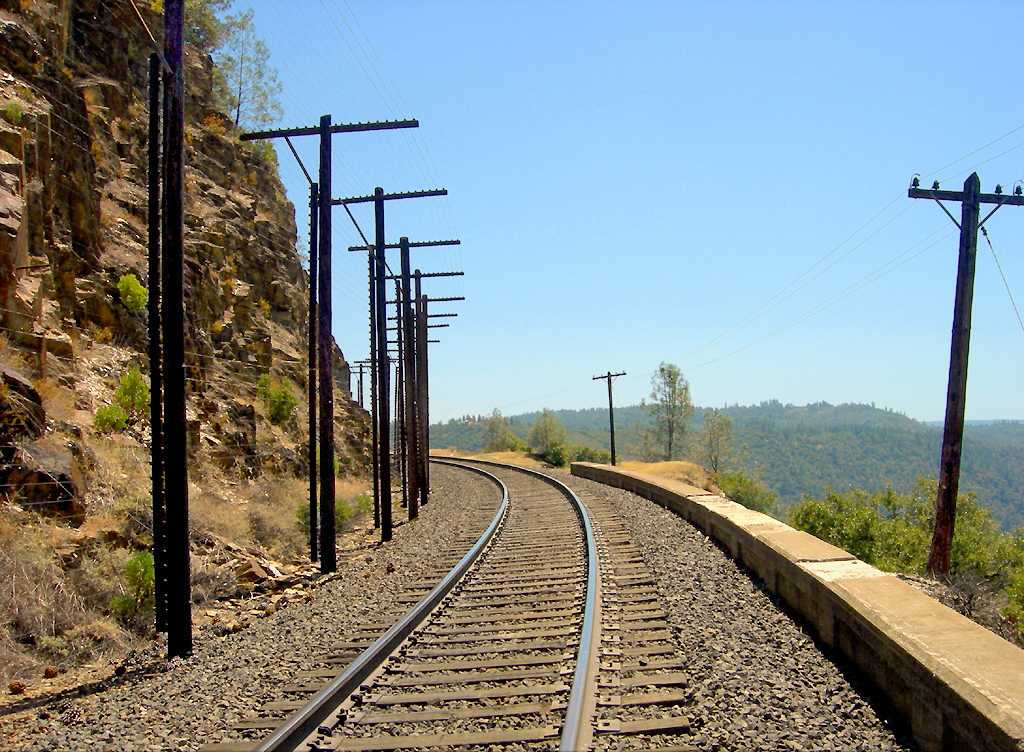
Trackside rock slide detector on the UPRR Sierra grade near Colfax, CA

== Prehistoric landslides ==
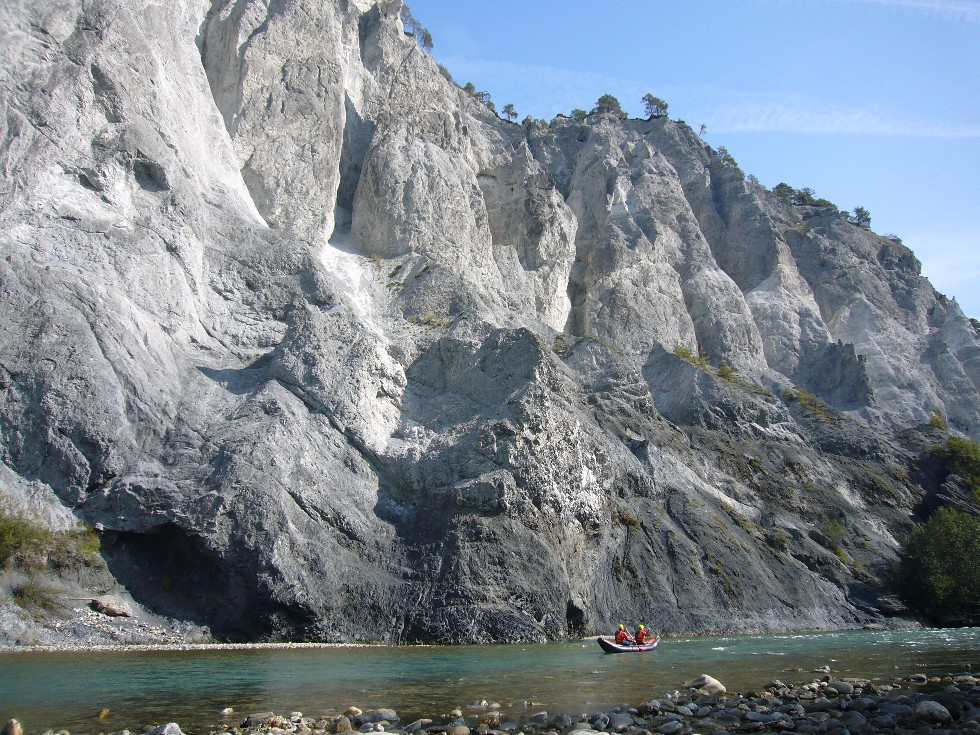
Rhine cutting through Flims Rockslide debris, Switzerland

The Aussera landslide, of Late Pleistocene age, Têt valley, Pyrénées-Orientales, France. The RD 66 main road runs around the foot of the landslide. This section of the valley is still prone to serious slope instability, with the road being blocked from time to time.

- Storegga Slide, some 8,000 years ago off the western coast of Norway. Caused massive tsunamis in Doggerland and other areas connected to the North Sea. A total volume of 3,500 km^{3} (840 cu mi) debris was involved; comparable to a 34 m (112 ft) thick area the size of Iceland. The submarine landslide is thought to be among the largest in history.
- Landslide which moved Heart Mountain to its current location, the largest continental landslide discovered so far. In the 48 million years since the slide occurred, erosion has removed most of the portion of the slide.
- Flims Rockslide, about 12 km^{3} (2.9 mi^{3}), Switzerland, some 10,000 years ago in post-glacial Pleistocene/Holocene, the largest so far described in the Alps and on dry land that can be easily identified in a modestly eroded state.
- The landslide around 200 BC which formed Lake Waikaremoana on the North Island of New Zealand, where a large block of the Ngamoko Range slid and dammed a gorge of Waikaretaheke River, forming a natural reservoir up to 256 metres (840 ft) deep.
- Cheekye Fan, British Columbia, Canada, about 25 km^{2} (9.7 mi^{2}), Late Pleistocene in age.
- The Manang-Braga rock avalanche/debris flow may have formed Marsyangdi Valley in the Annapurna Region, Nepal, during an interstadial period belonging to the last glacial period. Over 15 km^{3} (3.6 cu mi) of material are estimated to have been moved in the single event, making it one of the largest continental landslides. The debris source may have been a former 8,400 m peak north-east of Annapurna (leaving Khangsar Kang, 7,485 m) that collapsed, covering an area of about 96 km², with an original volume of even 21 km³.
- Tsergo Ri landslide, a massive slope failure 60 km (37 mi) north of Kathmandu, Nepal, involving an estimated 10 to 15 km^{3} (2.4 to 3.6 cu mi). Prior to this landslide the mountain may have been the world's 15th mountain above 8,000 m (26,247 ft).

== Historical landslides ==
- The 1806 Goldau landslide on 2 September 1806
- The Cap Diamant Québec rockslide on 19 September 1889
- Frank Slide, Turtle Mountain, Alberta, Canada, on 29 April 1903
- Khait landslide, Khait, Tajikistan, Soviet Union, on 10 July 1949
- A magnitude 7.5 earthquake in Yellowstone Park (17 August 1959) caused a landslide that blocked the Madison River, and created Quake Lake.
- Monte Toc landslide (260 million cubic metres; 9.2 billion cubic feet) falling into the Vajont Dam basin in Italy, causing a megatsunami and about 2000 deaths, on 9 October 1963
- Hope Slide landslide (46 million cubic metres; 1.6 billion cubic feet) near Hope, British Columbia on 9 January 1965.
- The 1966 Aberfan disaster
- Tuve landslide in Gothenburg, Sweden on 30 November 1977.
- The 1979 Abbotsford landslip, Dunedin, New Zealand on 8 August 1979.
- The eruption of Mount St. Helens(18 May 1980) caused an enormous landslide when the top 1,300 feet of the volcano gave way after a magnitude 5.1 earthquake, largest landslide in recorded history, accompanying eruption killed 57 people.
- Val Pola landslide during Valtellina disaster (1987) Italy
- Thredbo landslide, Australia on 30 July 1997, destroyed hostel.
- Vargas mudslides, due to heavy rains in Vargas State, Venezuela, in December, 1999, causing tens of thousands of deaths.
- 2005 La Conchita landslide in Ventura, California causing 10 deaths.
- 2006 Southern Leyte mudslide in Saint Bernard, Southern Leyte, causing 1,126 deaths and buried the village of Guinsaugon.
- 2007 Chittagong mudslide, in Chittagong, Bangladesh, on 11 June 2007.
- 2008 Cairo landslide on 6 September 2008.
- The 2009 Peloritani Mountains disaster caused 37 deaths, on October 1.
- The 2010 Uganda landslide caused over 100 deaths following heavy rain in Bududa region.
- Zhouqu county mudslide in Gansu, China on 8 August 2010.
- Devil's Slide, an ongoing landslide in San Mateo County, California
- 2011 Rio de Janeiro landslide in Rio de Janeiro, Brazil on 11 January 2011, causing 610 deaths.
- 2014 Pune landslide, in Pune, India.
- 2014 Oso mudslide, in Oso, Washington
- 2017 Mocoa landslide, in Mocoa, Colombia
- 2022 Ischia landslide
- 2024 Gofa landslides, in Gofa, Ethiopia
- 2024 Wayanad landslides, in Wayanad, Kerala, India
- 2025, in Blatten (Lötschen), Switzerland
- 2025 Tarasin landslide, Sudan

== Extraterrestrial landslides ==
Evidence of past landslides has been detected on many bodies in the Solar System, but since most observations are made by probes that only observe for a limited time and most bodies in the Solar System appear to be geologically inactive not many landslides are known to have happened in recent times. Both Venus and Mars have been subject to long-term mapping by orbiting satellites, and examples of landslides have been observed on both planets.

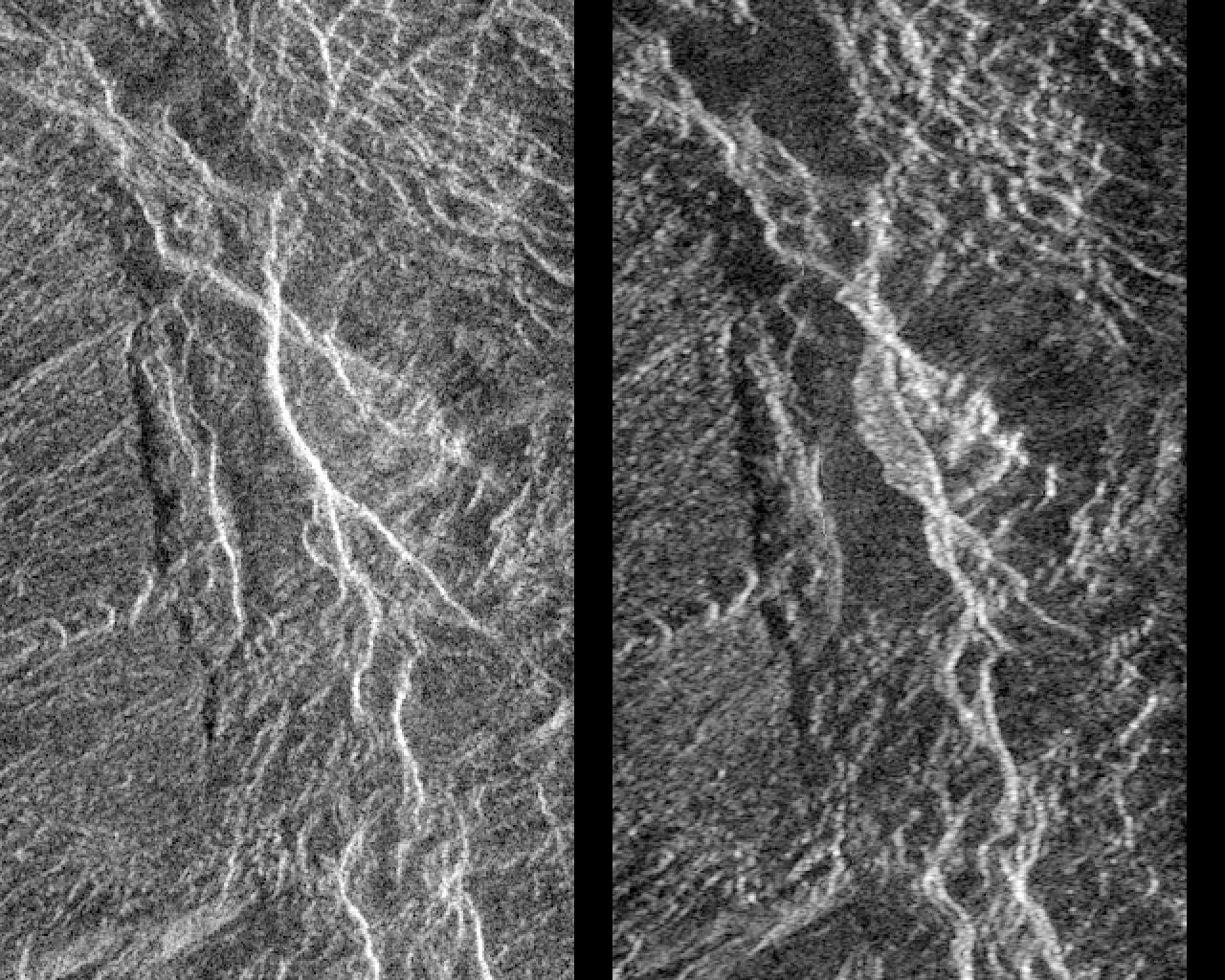
Before and after radar images of a landslide on Venus. In the center of the image on the right, the new landslide, a bright, flow-like area, can be seen extending to the left of a bright fracture. 1990 image.

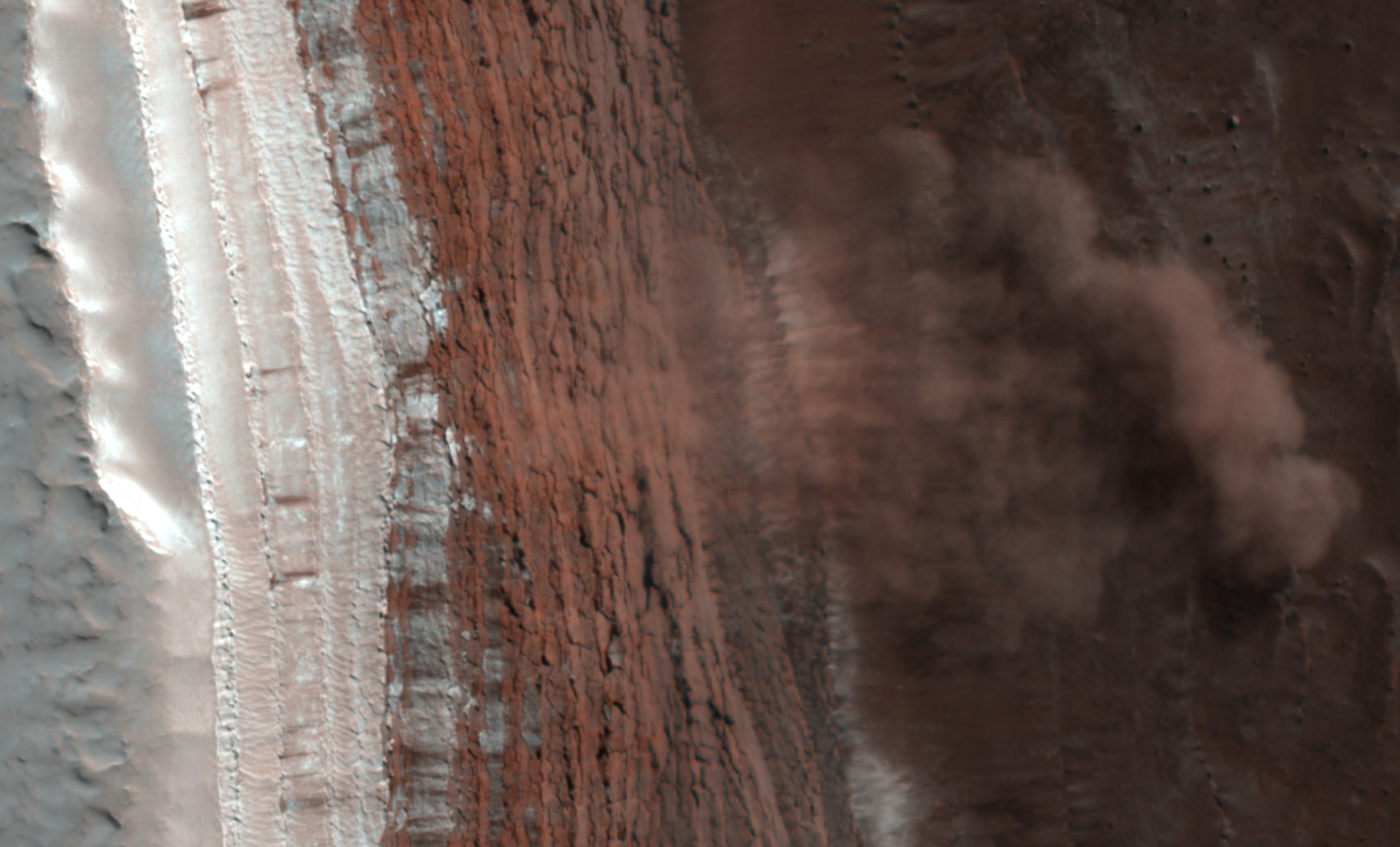
Landslide in progress on Mars, 2008-02-19

== Landslide mitigation ==
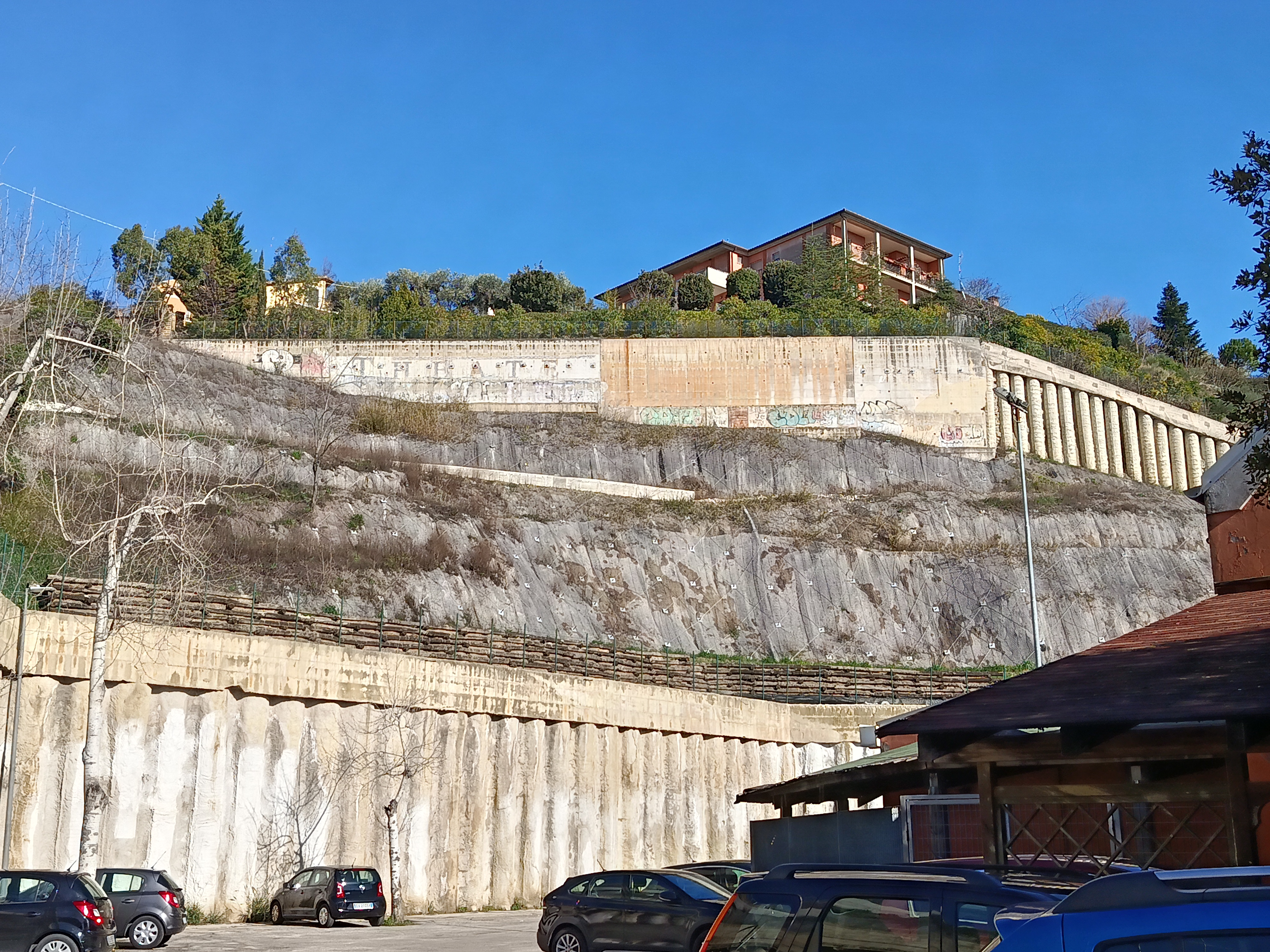
Two retaining walls and other soil slope stabilization methods in Chieti, Italy.

Landslide mitigation refers to human construction activities on slopes undertaken with the goal of lessening the effect of landslides. Landslides can be triggered by many, sometimes concomitant causes. In addition to shallow erosion or reduction of shear strength caused by seasonal rainfall, landslides may be triggered by anthropic activities, such as adding excessive weight above the slope or digging at either the mid-slope or foot of the slope.

Often, individual phenomena join to generate instability over time, which often does not allow a reconstruction of the evolution of a particular landslide. Therefore, landslide hazard mitigation measures are not generally classified according to the phenomenon that might cause a landslide. Instead, they are classified by the sort of slope stabilization method used:

- Geometric methods, in which the geometry of the hillside is changed (in general the slope);
- Hydrogeological methods, in which an attempt is made to lower the groundwater level or to reduce the water content of the material
- Chemical and mechanical methods, in which attempts are made to increase the shear strength of the unstable mass or to introduce active external forces (e.g. anchors, rock or ground nailing) or passive (e.g. structural wells, piles or reinforced ground) to counteract the destabilizing forces.

Each of these methods varies somewhat with the type of material that makes up the slope.

== Landslide monitoring ==
The monitoring of landslides is essential for estimating the dangerous situations, making it possible to issue alerts on time, to avoid loses of lives and property, and to have proper planning and reducing measures in place. Currently, there exist different type of techniques aimed to monitor landslides:

=== Remote sensing techniques ===
- InSAR (Interferometric Synthetic Aperture Radar): This remote sensing technique measures ground displacement over time with high precision. It is ideal for large-scale monitoring.
- LiDAR (Light Detection and Ranging): Provides detailed 3D models of terrain to detect changes over time by comparison of different point clouds acquired over time.
- Optical satellite imagery: Useful for identifying surface changes, geomorphological features (e.g. cracks and scarps) and mapping landslide-prone areas.
- UAVs (Unmanned Aerial Vehicles): This technique captures high-resolution images and topographic data in inaccessible areas.
- Thermal imaging: Thermal images enable to detects temperature variations that may indicate water movement or stress in the slope.

=== Ground-based techniques ===
- GPS (Global Positioning System): Tracks ground movements at specific points over time using a constellation of satellites orbiting around the Earth.
- Topographic surveys: Measures displacements of marked targets on a slope.
- Ground-based radar (GB-SAR): Continuously monitors surface deformation using a SAR sensor and detects movement in real-time. It follows the same principle than InSAR.

=== Geotechnical instrumentation ===
- Piezometers: Monitors groundwater levels and pore water pressure, which are critical triggers for landslides.
- Load cells: Measures stress changes in retaining structures or anchors.
- Tiltmeters: Detects small angular changes in the slope surface or retaining walls.
- Extensometers: Measures displacement along cracks or tension zones.
- Inclinometers: Detects subsurface movements by monitoring changes in the inclination of a borehole.

=== Seismic techniques ===
•Geophones and accelerometers: Detect seismic vibrations or movements that might indicate slope instability.

== Climate-change impact on landslides ==
Climate-change impact on temperature, both average rainfall and rainfall extremes, and evapotranspiration may affect landslide distribution, frequency and intensity. However, this impact shows strong variability in different areas. Therefore, the effects of climate change on landslides need to be studied on a regional scale. Climate change can have both positive and negative impacts on landslides. Temperature rise may increase evapotranspiration, leading to a reduction in soil moisture and stimulate vegetation growth, also due to a CO_{2} increase in the atmosphere. Both effects may reduce landslides in some conditions. On the other side, temperature rise causes an increase of landslides due to

- the acceleration of snowmelt and an increase of rain on snow during spring, leading to strong infiltration events.
- Permafrost degradation that reduces the cohesion of soils and rock masses due to the loss of interstitial ice. This mainly occurs at high elevation.
- Glacier retreat that has the dual effect of relieving mountain slopes and increasing their steepness.

Since the average precipitation is expected to decrease or increase regionally, rainfall induced landslides may change accordingly, due to changes in infiltration, groundwater levels and river bank erosion. Weather extremes are expected to increase due to climate change including heavy precipitation. This yields negative effects on landslides due to focused infiltration in soil and rock and an increase of runoff events, which may trigger debris flows.

== See also ==
- Avalanche
- California landslides
- Deformation monitoring
- Earthquake engineering
- Glacier collapse
- Geotechnical engineering
- Huayco
- Landslide dam
- Natural disaster
- Railway slide fence
- Rockslide
- Rock-ice avalanche
- Sector collapse
- Slump (geology)
- Urban search and rescue
- Washaway
