= Stausee Ferden =

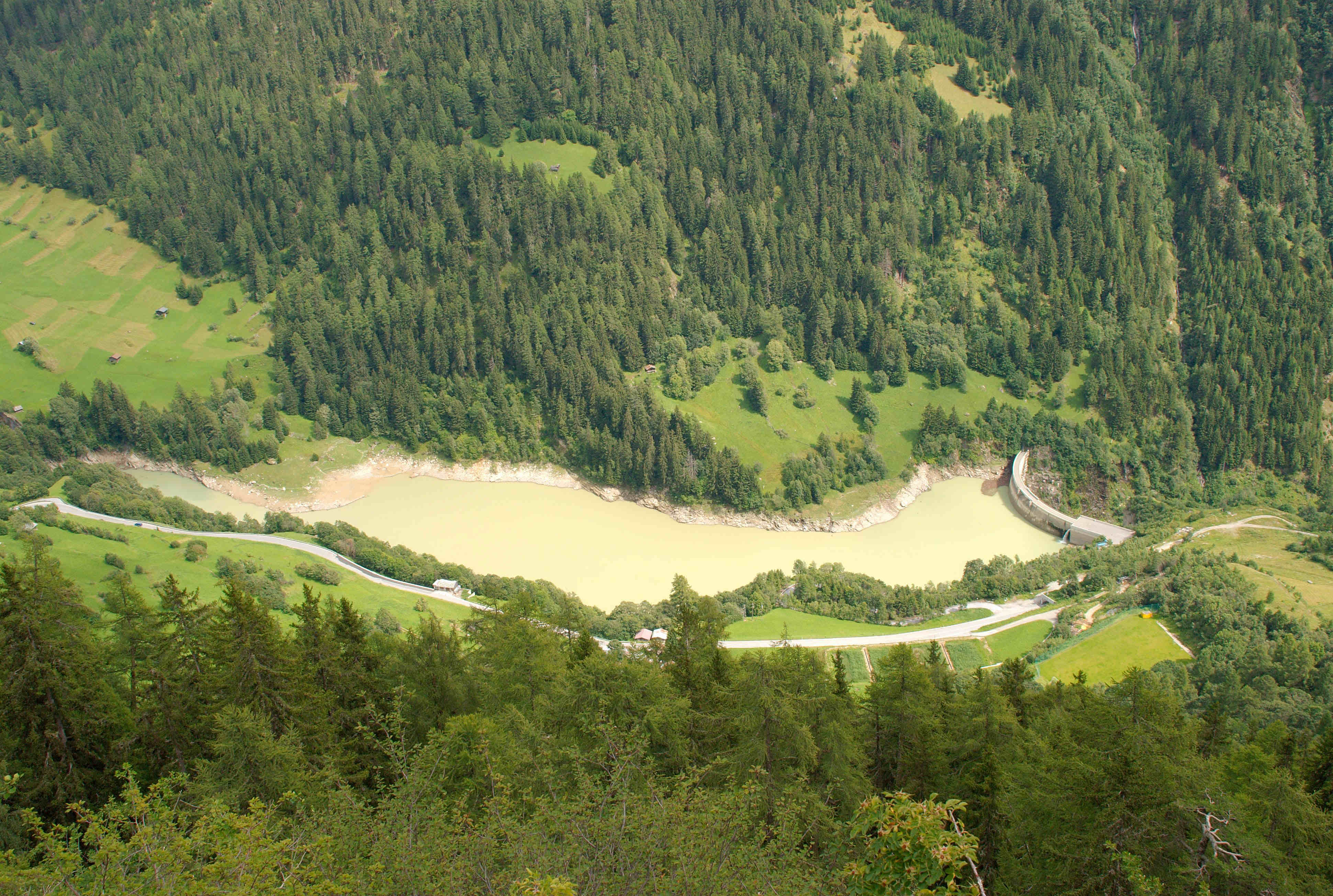

- Location within Canton of Valais Location within Switzerland Location within Alps
- Interactive map of Stausee Ferden
- Location: Ferden, Valais
- Coordinates: 46°23′16″N 7°45′26″E
- Type: reservoir
- Primary inflows: Lonza
- Primary outflows: Lonza
- Catchment area: 139.2 km^{2} (53.7 sq mi)
- Basin countries: Switzerland
- Surface area: 10.6 ha (26 acres)
- Water volume: 1.89 million cubic metres (1,530 acre⋅ft)
- Residence time: 36 hours
- Surface elevation: 1,311 m (4,301 ft)

Stausee Ferden ("Ferden reservoir") is a reservoir on the Lonza river at Ferden, Valais, Switzerland. Its surface area is 10.6 ha (26 acres). Its construction was completed in 9 June 1976.

The lake has the shortest lake retention time in the world.

== See also ==
- List of mountain lakes of Switzerland
