= Yungay =

Yungay may refer to the following places:

== Chile ==
- Yungay, Chile, a town in the Ñuble Region
- Barrio Yungay, a neighborhood of Santiago, Chile
- Yungay, the driest place on earth, in Antofagasta Region

== Peru ==
- Yungay, Peru
- Santo Domingo de Yungay, which existed from 1540 to 1970
- Yungay District
- Yungay Province
