= Santo Domingo de Yungay =

Former town in Peru

Yungay Santo Domingo de Yungay
- Town
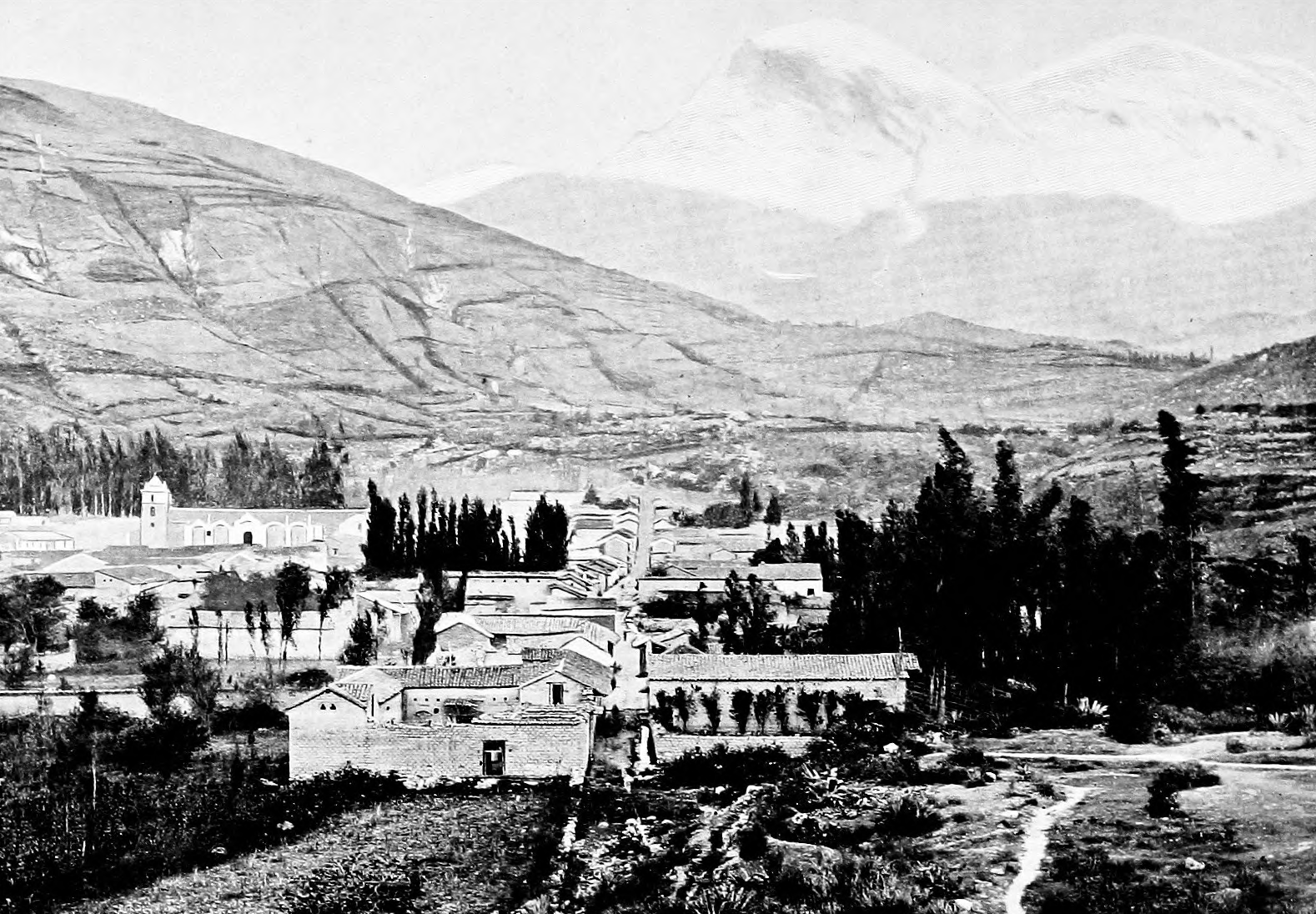
- The town in 1907

- Seal
- Nicknames: Señorial, Noble y Heroica Villa de Yungay (1540), Benemérita Ciudad de Yungay (1840), Yungay hermosura (1875)
- Interactive map of Yungay
- Coordinates: 9°8′20″S 77°44′40″W
- Country: Peru
- Region: Ancash
- Province: Yungay
- District: Yungay
- Founded: August 4, 1540
- Destroyed: May 31, 1970
- Founder: Domingo de Santo Tomás

Government
  - Mayor: Graciela Ángeles (1970)

Population (1970)
  - Total: 20,000
- Demonym(s): Yungaíno, a
- Time zone: UTC-5 (PET)

Yungay, currently known as Yungay Viejo (Spanish for "Old Yungay") and founded in 1540 as Santo Domingo de Yungay, was a town in Peru that served as the seat of the province of the same name in the Department of Ancash. Located 2,400 m.a.s.l., it was destroyed by a landslide that originated at the nearby Huascarán mountain due to the 1970 Ancash earthquake. Five thousand people disappeared during the event, with some 300 people surviving due to taking refuge in the local cemetery.

== History ==
=== Spanish era ===
Yungay Valley was explored by Europeans for the first time by the Spanish conquistadors in 1533 during reconnaissance expeditions from Cajamarca commanded by Hernando de Soto and Miguel de Estete. Dominican Order members founded the town and the convent of Santo Domingo de Yungay on August 4, 1540. At the initiative of Father Domingo de Santo Tomás, the jurisdiction was elevated to the category of Vicariate in 1579.

On January 6, 1730, a violent earthquake caused an avalanche from Huandoy mountain towards a glacial lagoon, which produced an alluvium that destroyed the town of Áncash, located upstream of the river of the same name, four kilometres north of the current city of Yungay. On that day, the population celebrated the Epiphany and the birthday of their mayor. One thousand five hundred people disappeared.

=== Republican era ===
During the Viceroyalty and the Republic, Yungay developed alongside Huaraz. Its inhabitants enjoyed a wealthy lifestyle as many families owned enormous areas of agricultural estates and exploited mines in the high Andean areas.

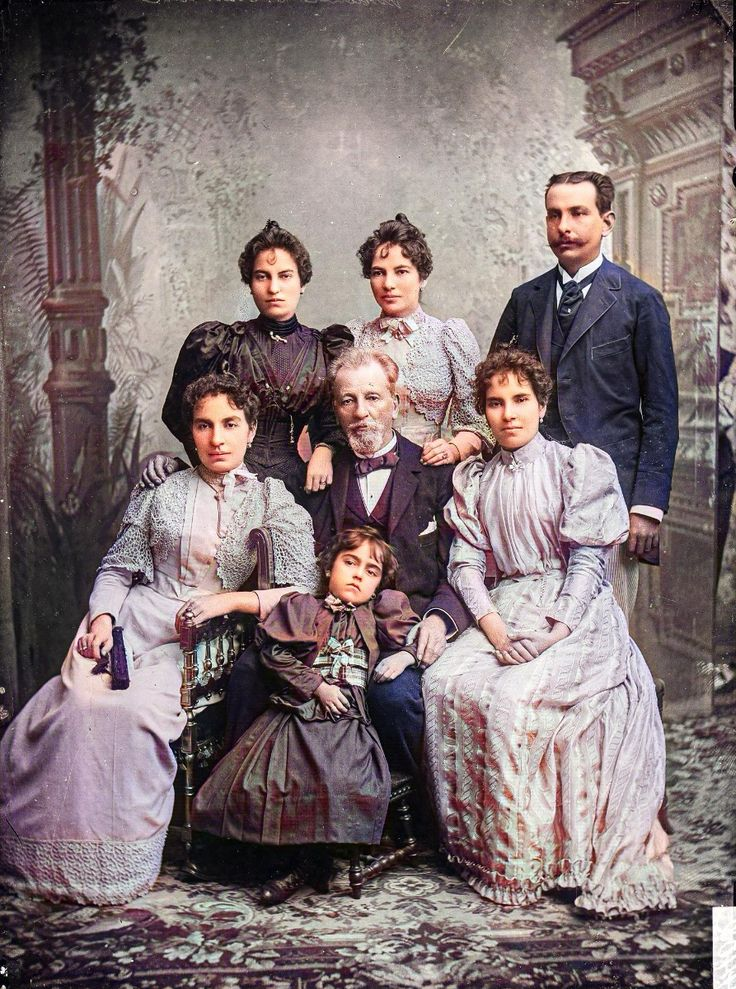
Vinatea Family: Yungay landowners of the republican era.

On January 20, 1839, the Battle of Yungay took place in which the Peru–Bolivian Confederation was dissolved with the victory of the Chilean-Peruvian Army. It was called Villa Ancachs in honour of the battle. However, this name conferred by Agustín Gamarra and which would later be designated to the department, did not catch on with the local population.

In 1885, rebel Indians under the guidance of Pedro Pablo Atusparía besieged Yungay, during the indigenous rebellion of Huaraz. After a local resistance that claimed the lives of hundreds of residents, the mayor was forced to surrender on behalf of the town. In honor of this event, the city's public charity erected an obelisk in memory of the city's defenders in 1920.

The conversion into a province took place on October 28, 1904, with Law 006, after half a century of efforts. Up until its disappearance in 1970, the city had approximately 5,000 inhabitants. It was the second most developed city in the department after Huaraz.

On 11 January 1962 an avalanche from Huascarán destroyed Ranrahirca and eight other villages in which an estimated 4,000 were killed, however, Yungay was spared.

=== Disappearance ===
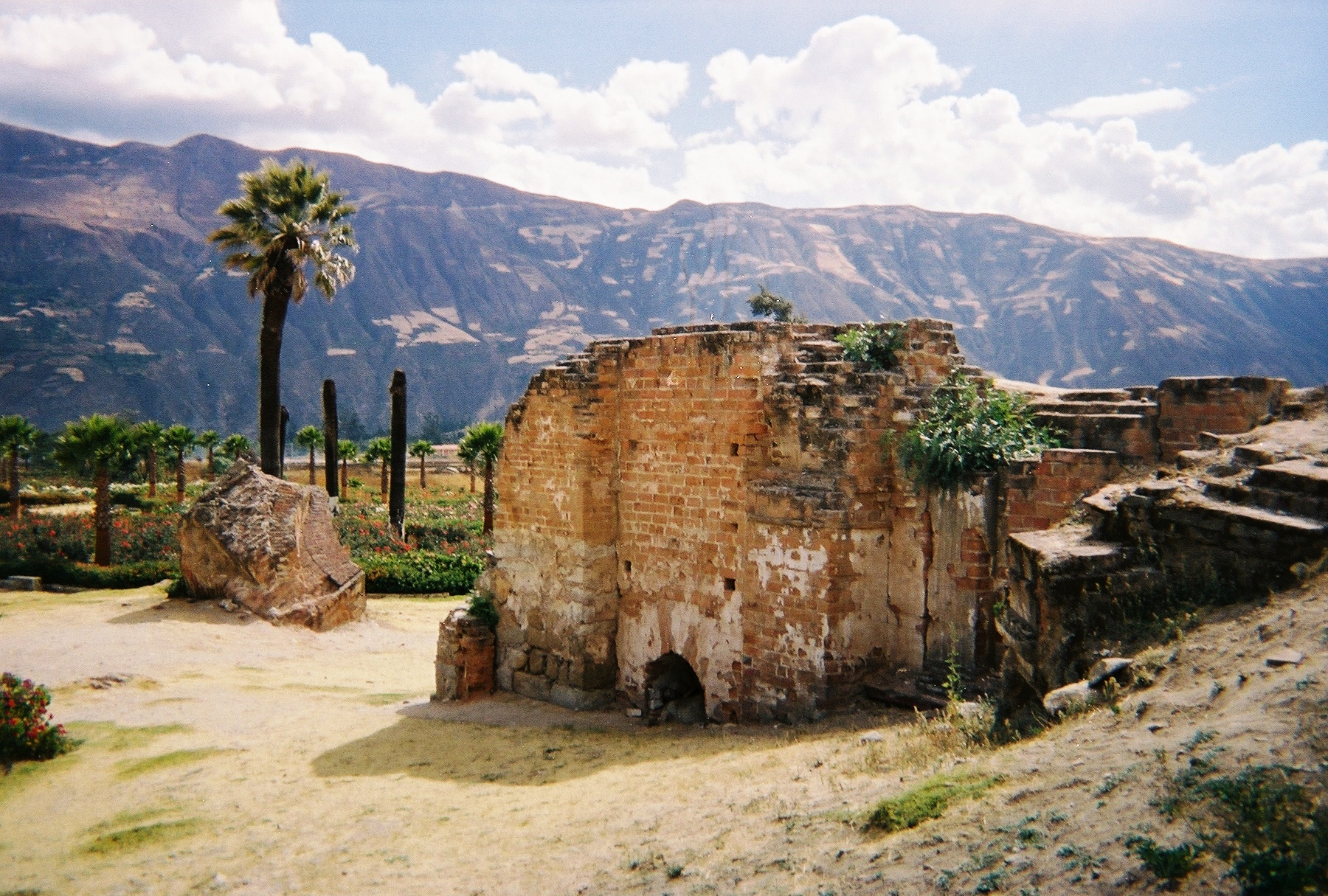
The remnants of Yungay's town church after the landslide

In 1962, two American scientists, David Bernays and Charles Sawyer, had reported seeing a massive vertical slab of rock being undermined by a glacier on mount Huascarán Norte, which threatened to fall and cause the obliteration of Yungay. According to Sawyer, when this was reported in the Expreso newspaper (27 September 1962), the government ordered them to retract or face prison, and they fled the country. Citizens were forcibly prevented from speaking of an impending disaster. Eight years later, the prediction came true.

On 31 May 1970, the Ancash earthquake caused a substantial part of the north side of a mountain, Nevado Huascarán, to collapse and an unstable mass of glacial ice about 800 meters across at the top of Nevado Huascarán to fall. This caused a debris avalanche, burying the town of Yungay and killing 20,000 people, with only 400 people survivors. More than 50 million cubic meters of debris slid approximately 15 kilometers downhill at an angle of about 14 degrees. Speeds between 340 mph to 620 mph were achieved. Most of the survivors were in the cemetery and stadium at the time of the earthquake, as these zones were the highest in town.

The Peruvian government has forbidden excavation in the area where the old town of Yungay is buried, declaring it a national cemetery. The current town was rebuilt 2 km (1 mi) north of the destroyed city.

After its destruction, its surviving inhabitants moved into temporary tents until 1971, when construction of new wooden and brick houses began and eventually developed into a new town with the same name.

== See also ==
- Yungay, Peru
- 1970 Ancash earthquake
