= Battle of Yungay =

1839 battle in western Peru which ended the War of the Confederation

- Part of the War of the Confederation
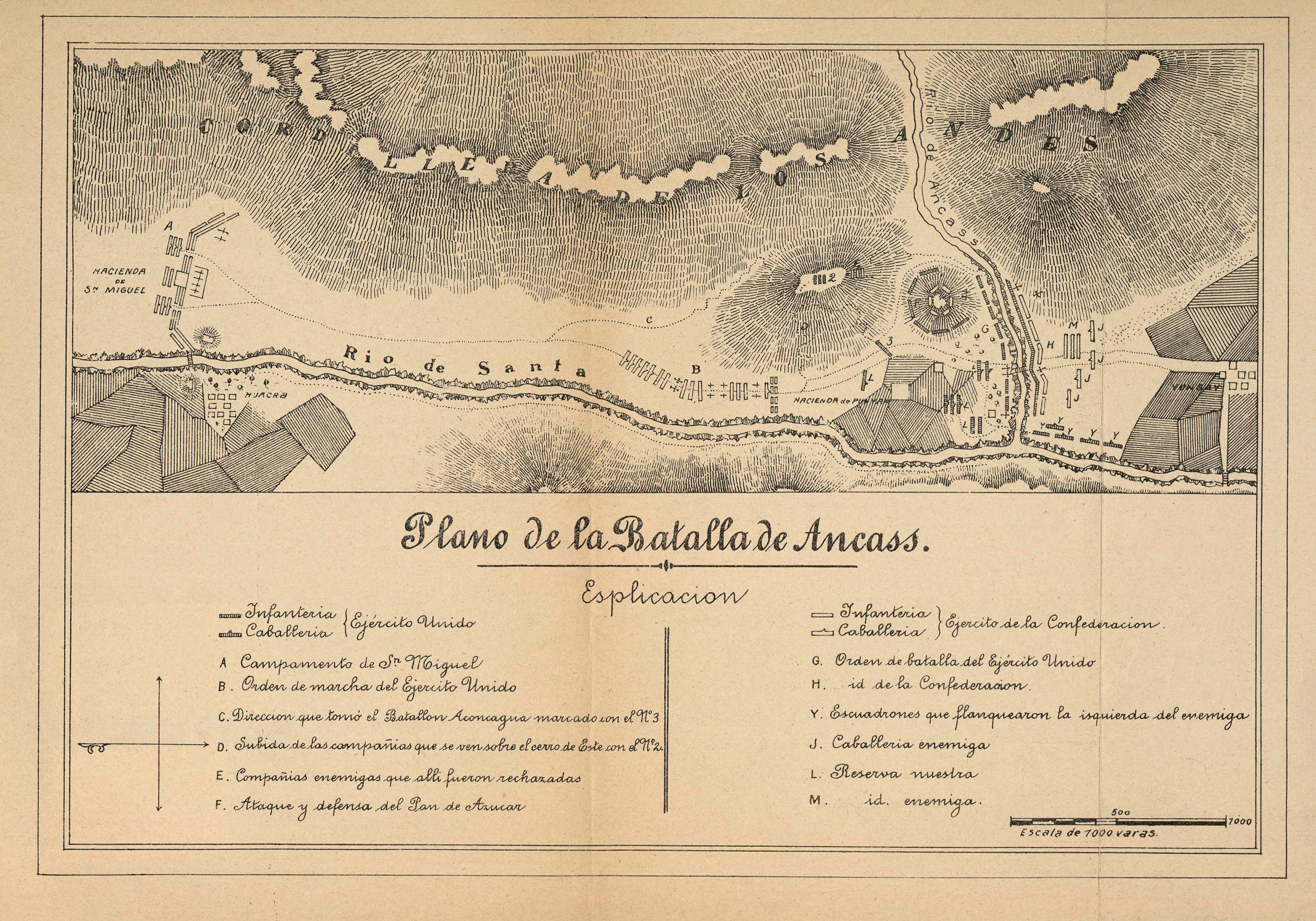
- Planning map for the Battle of Yungay
| Date | January 20, 1839 |
| Location | Yungay, Huaylas, Peru |
| Result | Chilean–Peruvian restorationist víctory; Dissolution of the Peru–Bolivian Confederation |

Belligerents
| United Restoration: Chile; Gamarra government | Peru–Bolivian Confederation |

Commanders and leaders
| Manuel Bulnes | A. de Santa Cruz |

Strength
| 5,400 men | 6,000 men |

Casualties and losses
| 800 killed | 3,800 casualties |

The Battle of Yungay (or Yungai) was the final battle of the War of the Confederation, fought on January 20, 1839, near Yungay, Peru. The United Restoration Army, led by Chilean General Manuel Bulnes, consisting mainly of Chileans and 600 North Peruvian dissidents, attacked the Peru-Bolivian Confederation forces led by Andrés de Santa Cruz in northern Peru, 200 kilometers (120 mi) north of Lima.

After six hours of fighting, the Restorers destroyed the Confederate Army, bringing the War of the Confederation to its end. Santa Cruz exiled himself in Guayaquil, Ecuador. The new Peruvian government paid its debt with Chile from the liberation expedition from a decade ago, and gave awards to Chilean and Peruvian officials. Peruvian officers who served under the Confederation, including Guillermo Miller, Mariano Necochea, Luis José Orbegoso, and Domingo Nieto, were banned from the Peruvian Army.

== Prologue ==
Chile declared war on the Peru Bolivian Confederacy on 1837, and sent an expedition to Peru under Admiral Manuel Blanco Encalada. Santa Cruz avoided an engagement, and skillfully surrounded Blanco Encalada at Paucarpata. Blanco Encalada was forced to sign a treaty on November 17. By this pact, Chile agreed to resume commercial trade and the Confederation would recognize and pay the Chilean efforts in the Peruvian independence war.

The Chilean Congress and the public opinion considered the outcome of the expedition humiliating and rejected the treaty. Also, it was believed that Santa Cruz was behind the assassination of Diego Portales. All this invigorated an anti-confederacy sentiment, and the Chileans organized a second expedition. This time, the command was given to General Manuel Bulnes. The expedition had 5,400 Chileans and 600 expatriate Peruvians under General Agustin Gamarra. Andres de Santa Cruz, responded immediately reinstating the hostilities.

The second Chilean campaign had far more success than the first one. Bulnes defeated General Orbegoso at Portada de Guias on August 21, 1838, and entered into Lima. Also, the Chilean Fleet secured sea domination in the Battle of Casma. Despite the victory, Bulnes left the city by November, and marched to Huacho in the North Peruvian territory, forced by local animosity, lack of supplies and diseases. Also, news had arrived indicating that Santa Cruz was closing in with an outnumbering army. Afterwards, Santa Cruz entered into Lima under popular ovation, then proceeded to follow Bulnes.

Both armies engaged at Buin, on January 6, 1839, in the confluence of Buin and Santa rivers, with indecisive results. Bulnes continued marching north and Santa Cruz resumed the persecution seeking to deliver a final blow to cement Confederation's dominance in the region.

Santa Cruz occupied Yungay, trying to cut Bulnes' supply lines and strangle the Restorers. His intention wasn't to obliterate the Restorer Army, but rather to force Bulnes to surrender to a superior Confederate force. Bulnes had other plans however, realizing that returning empty-handed was not an option after Blanco Encalada's failure.

Both armies had about 6,000 men, although the numbers favored slightly the Confederates. The Chilean expedition, on the other hand, suffered the decimation of some battalions by plagues during Lima occupation. Comparably equipped, the main difference was in the preparation of the troops, the knowledge of the terrain, and the obvious differences between invaders and defenders.

== Contenders ==
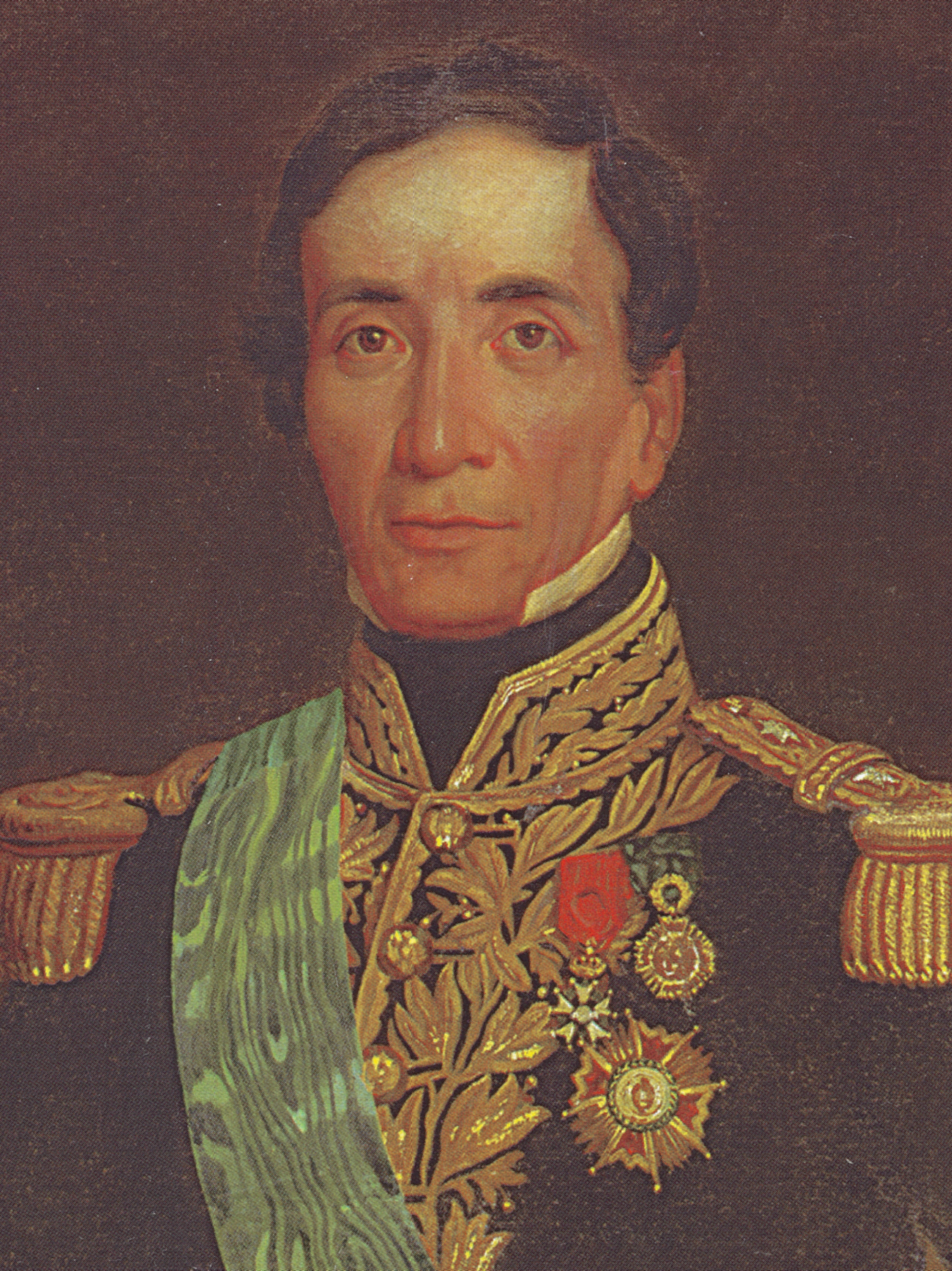
Marshall Andrés de Santa Cruz

=== Opposing Forces ===
==== Confederate Army ====
The Confederate Army was made up of veterans of internal battles from both Peru and Bolivia. It was generally supported by the population of Peru and possessed strong supply lines thanks to the site of the battle. Its commanding officer, General Andrés de Santa Cruz; was regarded as a resourceful tactician and a capable leader. His army had about 6,000 men divided into three divisions, adding up nine infantry battalions and two cavalry regiments.

==== Chilean Army ====
The Restorer Army had the experience of Gen. Manuel Bulnes. On the other hand, it was not popular with the locals and was hampered due to disease, bad morale, and some less experienced units. This army of 5,400 soldiers was conformed by nine infantry battalions and three cavalry regiments grouped into four divisions.

=== Preliminary moves ===
Both armies marched under the rain and set themselves up near Tarar, and subsequently marched on towards San Miguel. Santa Cruz, after stopping in Tarhuaz, then occupied the town of Yungay on 13 January.

On the night of 19 January, Santa Cruz sent Colonel Rodriguez Margariños to observe the Chilean positions. He also ordered the Bolivian Colonel Anselmo Quiroz, with 600 soldiers, to take up positions on the Pan de Azúcar Hill, while Colonel Fructuoso de la Peña advanced towards the Punyán Hill with another 200 soldiers.

At dawn on 20 January, Gen Bulnes marched with his four divisions to Yungay, whilst Santa Cruz deployed his army along the Ancash River, with Herrera's division on the right flank. The artillery was set up in the middle and, behind it, the cavalry, led by General Perez de Urdinea. Finally, Moran's division was stationed on the left flank.

=== Battlefield ===
Both forces were separated by a short valley formed by the Santa River and the mountains, with the Punyán, Ancash and Pan de Azúcar hills at the far end of this site. Behind these heights lay the deep Ancash Valley, followed by the Confederate trenches.

== The battle ==
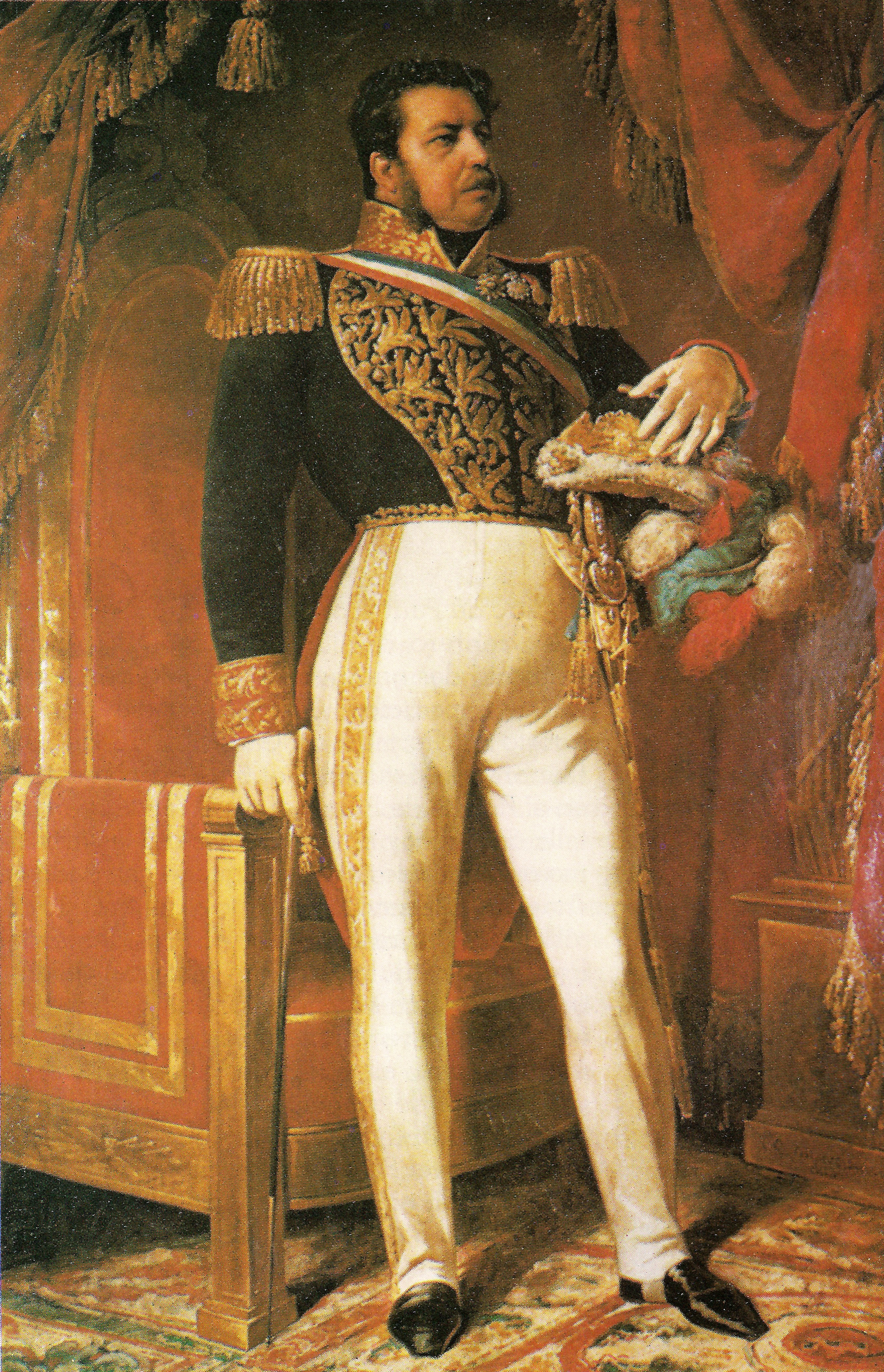
General Manuel Bulnes Prieto, commander of the Chilean Expeditionary Force and the Restorer Army.

=== Confrontation on the Punyán and Pan de Azúcar hills ===
Bulnes decided to attack the Confederates at Punyán Hill first. Under Elespuru, Silva's Aconcagua Battalion was dispatched to clear out the hill. Silva succeeded and forced out de la Peña's, but Elespuru was mortally wounded. After them, Bulnes sent the Portales, Valdivia and Huaylas battalions.

At 9 am, a column of 400 soldiers under Jerónimo Valenzuela and formed by companies from the Carampangue, Santiago, Valparaíso and Cazadores de Perú battalions, was sent to the Pan de Azúcar Hill to assail Col. Quiroz' position. The Restorers began the slowly climbing of the hill slope under heavy fire.

The Restorer columns sustained severe losses. Valenzuela and all the officers were killed. The Carampangue's company alone was led in the end by Sergeant Candelaria Perez. The rest of the companies were severely decimated too. Nevertheless, the Restorers finally reached the summit and bayoneted the Confederates out of Pan de Azúcar Hill. All of the defenders were killed, including Quiroz himself. The Valparaíso Battalion Sergeant Jose Alegría raised the Chilean flag on the Pan de Azúcar Hill summit.

=== Maneuvers on the Ancash Glen ===
Marshall Santa Cruz sent Col. Deheza's battalion to reinforce Quiroz at Punyán Hill, marching through the Ancash Valley, but en route encountered and engaged with the Colchagua Battalion led by Col. Urriola, forcing the Chileans to respond with a bayonet charge. Bulnes ordered the Portales Battalion to aid Urriola, a maneuver that obliged the Bolivians to pull out of the valley and withdraw to Herrera's positions with the loss our a third of its initial strength.

With the Pan de Azúcar and Punyán hills conquered, Bulnes then planned a frontal attack on Santa Cruz army, which was arranged in a line of trenches on the opposite bank of the Ancash River. So, with the Chilean forces converging on the river bank, the Colchagua and Valdivia battalions were dispatched to engage the Confederate right flank, guarded by Herrera's division, while the Portales, Cazadores de Perú and the Huaylas battalions were ordered to attack Col. Moran's division. The five cannon battery of Col. Marcos Maturana set up on the Punyán heights began to shell and slowly dismantle the Confederate trenches. As the bridge over the Ancash had been destroyed, the Chileans had to go down to the river shore and march across it.

Once Bulnes' troops crossed the river, then the battle covered the entire front line, with the Restorer soldiers out in the open and the Confederates firing at them from their trenches. From this protected position, the Confederates were able to thwart the attack.

At 14:30 hrs, Gen. Pedro Bermúdez led his 3rd of Bolivia Battalion in a bayonet charge on Portales' Battalion and broke its lines. Soon after, the cavalry was sent in to cut off the Chilean retreat while the infantry advance from their protected positions to attack the Restorers troops in the open field.

=== Decisive blow ===
Witnessing the Chilean retreat, Gen. Bulnes crossed the Ancash with a battalion and reinforced Garcia, followed by the Santiago and half of Huaylas Battalion. The Chileans rallied and resumed the attack. A few Confederate battalions managed to get back to their trenches.

Perez de Urdinea's cavalry crossed the river and clashed with Baquedano's Cazadores a Caballo Cavalry Regiment. In fighting so near to the Confederate lines, Baquedano was wounded and was forced to retreat. However, the Chilean cavalry attacked again with full force, obliging Perez de Urdinea to regroup with the Confederate infantry trying to retreat to their trenches. In a massive third charge, Baquedano broke Santa Cruz's left flank and the entire Confederate front collapsed.

With both armies now engaged in the gap between the trenches and the river, the Confederates tried to resist but were surrounded and completely vanquished. The disbanded troops were pursued by the Chilean cavalry and killed. According to Gonzalo Bulnes, 277 Confederates were found dead on the road between Manco and Yungay. Santa Cruz, followed by his generals Riva Agüero, Cerdeña and Miller, left the battlefield around 15:00 hrs.

== Aftermath ==
This was a decisive defeat for the Peru-Bolivian Confederacy. Santa Cruz had around 3,000 dead, including two generals, 9 colonels, 100 officers and 2,500 soldiers, around half of its effective force. The Restorer Army lost one general, 39 officers and 622 soldiers.

The Battle of Yungay brought the Peru-Bolivian Confederacy to an end. The Chilean Expeditionary Force reoccupied Lima on April. On 25 August 1839. General Agustín Gamarra assumed the Presidency of Peru, and officially declared the dissolution of the Confederation and the reunification of Peru. Santa Cruz was exiled, first to Guayaquil, Ecuador, then to Chile and finally to Europe, where he died in Beauvoir, France, on 25 September 1865. He was 72.

Manuel Bulnes returned to Chile. He was elected President of Chile for two consecutive periods, from 1841 to 1851.

The battle and subsequent Chilean victory was commemorated in Chile by the naming of Barrio Yungay, a new neighborhood which was officially proclaimed in Santiago in 1839. Within the neighborhood a monument to the roto chileno, a homage to the common person as many of the troops in the battle were normal citizens, sits in the similarly named Plaza Yungay.

== See also ==
- Yungay

== Sources ==
- (in Spanish) The Birth of the Confederation
- (in Spanish) Chilean Army
- (in Spanish) Basadre, Jorge; La segunda campaña restauradora de Guía a Yungay
- Bulnes, Gonzalo (1878). Historia de la Campaña del Perú en 1838 (in Spanish). Impr. Los Tiempos.
- (in Spanish) Santa Cruz: El Cóndor indio
- Reyno, Manuel; González, Edmundo (1985). Historia del Ejército de Chile, Vol III (in Spanish). Estado Mayor del Ejército de Chile.
