= Candelaria Pérez =

Chilean soldier (1810–1870)

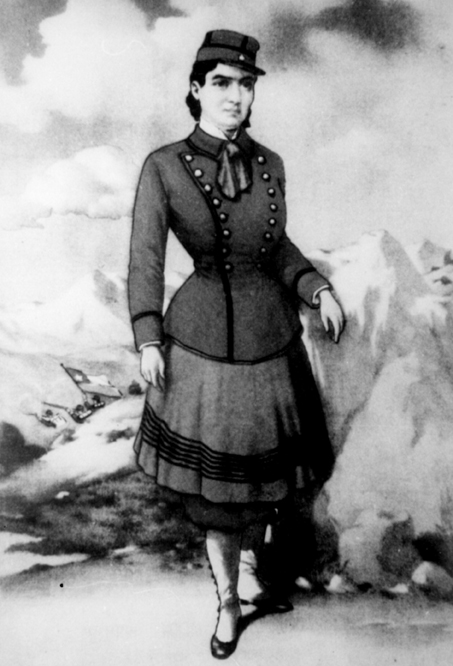
- Born: 1810; Santiago, Viceroyalty of Peru
- Died: 28 March 1870 (aged 59 or 60); Santiago, Chile
- Military career
- Allegiance: Chile
- Branch: Chilean Army
- Service years: 1837–1840
- Rank: Ensign
- Nickname: "La Sargento Candelaria"
- Conflicts: War of the Confederation: Battle of Yungay

Candelaria Pérez (1810 – 28 March 1870) was a Chilean soldier who served in the War of the Confederation (1836–39) against the Peru–Bolivian Confederation. She took up a rifle and fought alongside the troops she served with. She was considered the hero of the Battle of Yungay, during which she led an assault against the entrenched Confederate troops. She was given official recognition and the rank of sergeant after the battle, following her reception by the public as a hero. Thereafter she was publicly known as "Sergeant Candelaria".

Earlier in her life she had been a domestic servant, first in Valparaiso and then in Peru, after which she opened a tavern. When war broke out she closed her tavern and began taking part in Chile's war efforts, acting as a spy, then a suttler, and finally as a combatant.

She was made a commissioned officer before she left the army in 1840, with the rank of Alférez (translated as ensign).
