= Ranrahirca District =

Coordinates: 9°10′01″S 77°43′59″W

Ranrahirca Ranrahirka
- District
- Interactive map of Ranrahirca
- Country: Peru
- Region: Ancash
- Province: Yungay
- Founded: October 15, 1941
- Capital: Ranrahirca

Area
  - Total: 22.89 km^{2} (8.84 sq mi)
- Elevation: 2,475 m (8,120 ft)

Population (2005 census)
  - Total: 3,291
  - Density: 143.8/km^{2} (372.4/sq mi)
- Time zone: UTC-5 (PET)
- UBIGEO: 022006

Ranrahirca District is one of eight districts of the Yungay Province in Peru.

== Ethnic groups ==
The people in the district are mainly indigenous citizens of Quechua descent. Quechua is the language which the majority of the population (52.53%) learnt to speak in childhood, 47.09% of the residents started speaking using the Spanish language (2007 Peru Census).
