= 1970 Huascarán debris avalanche =

Deadliest avalanche in recorded history

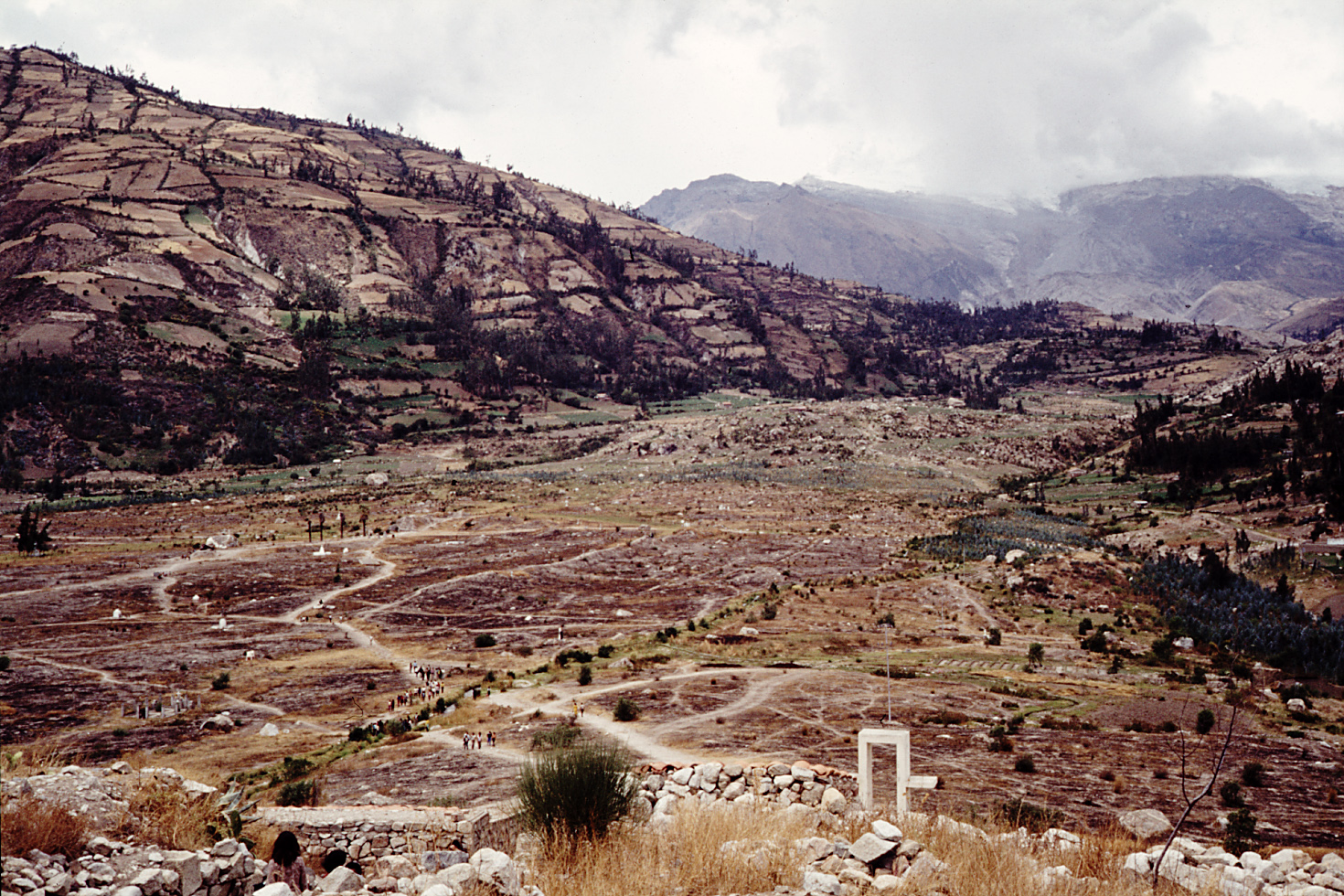
- Yungay Viejo (old Yungay) in 1980, ten years after the disaster
- Date: May 31, 1970
- Location: Yungay, Yungay Province, Áncash Region, Peru
- Type: Debris avalanche / Mudflow / Glacier collapse
- Cause: Ancash earthquake
- Deaths: 30,000
- Missing: Unknown
- Property damage: Most of Yungay, Ranrahirca and several smaller villages destroyed

On 31 May 1970, a debris avalanche and mudflow triggered by the Ancash earthquake destroyed the town of Yungay, Peru and 10 nearby villages, leaving up to 30,000 people dead. It is the deadliest avalanche or glacier-related disaster in history, surpassing the death toll from the previous deadliest avalanche disaster, the avalanches of White Friday on the Italian front of World War I and the third or fourth most deadly landslide-related disaster of the 20th century, after the Haiyuan landslides (China), the Armero tragedy (Colombia) and by some estimates the Khait landslide (Tajikistan).

The north peak of Huascarán from which the avalanche originated had been considered unstable since 1962, when a smaller collapse wiped out several villages of the Callejón de Huaylas valley near Yungay. However, the provincial government made efforts to prevent the news from spreading and urged people not to panic. The 1970 earthquake destabilized a glacier and snowmass which surged rapidly downhill, becoming a mudflow as it accumulated large volumes of loose dirt, rock and surface water. The death toll was made worse due to the earthquake having occurred on a Sunday, as thousands more people had congregated in Yungay for market when the mudflow struck and leveled the city. The slide then entered the Río Santa and caused extensive damage as it flowed all the way downstream to the Pacific Ocean, a distance of 160 kilometres (100 mi), mostly through a narrow canyon.

Following the disaster, the Peruvian government conducted relief efforts and planned to move the provincial capital from Yungay to a safer location at Tingua. Survivors resisted the resettlement proposal and thousands stayed in a camp just north of the destroyed city known as "Yungay Norte", which would eventually become the present-day town of Yungay. The government has forbidden redevelopment or excavation of the original town site, where a memorial has been established to commemorate the dead. Although most of Yungay was completely leveled by the earthquake and mudflow, some remnants, including the ruined cathedral and cemetery, can still be seen in the area.

Although Yungay was located outside of the direct avalanche path, the slide was so large that it overwhelmed the natural geographic barriers protecting the town, whose location had previously been considered safe. The United States Geological Survey stated that "conceivably, such an event may not occur again for thousands of years."

== Background ==
=== Geography and geology ===
Due to its rugged terrain, high elevation and location in an active seismic zone, the Callejón de Huaylas, or upper Río Santa valley has historically been vulnerable to large landslides, mudslides and avalanches. Huascáran, the highest peak of the Peruvian Andes, rises to an elevation of 6,768 m (22,205 ft) to the east of the valley. Río Llanguanuco, a tributary of Río Santa, drains a ravine on the northwest flank of Huascáran and cuts a steep southwesterly path to join the larger river, forming an alluvial fan in a wide valley near its mouth. Due to the availability of fertile soils and surface water, the area had been farmed for hundreds of years and was home to many small villages. The original site of Yungay town was an elevated area northeast of the Río Santa and north-west of the Río Llanguanuco; it was outside of the Llanguanuco valley, with a low ridge (Cerro de Aira) separating the two.

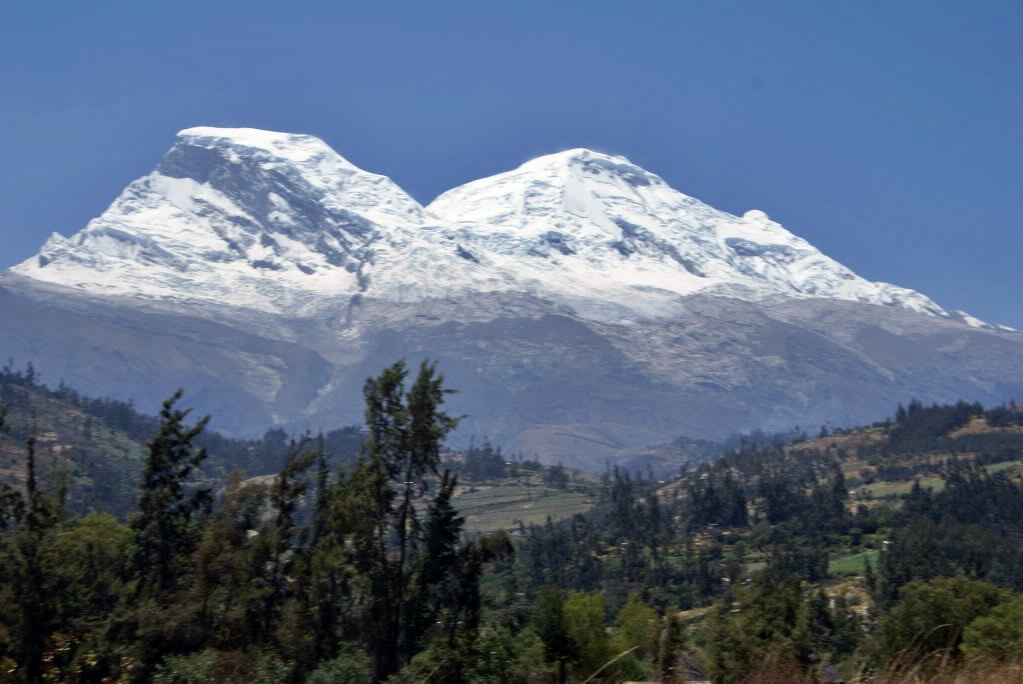
View of Nevado Huascarán from Yungay

Debris-flow deposits of Holocene origin make up the Río Llanganuco alluvial fan and underlie the Río Santa bed for depths of hundreds of metres in places, indicating that such flows have occurred here regularly for thousands of years. Geologic evidence indicates that Yungay itself was "probably built on a flow or avalanche deposit." The name of nearby Ranrahirca village means "pile of thrown stones" in Quechua, suggesting that debris avalanches have been observed in the valley since ancient times. These destructive flows of snow, ice, mud and rock are locally termed huaycos.

The northwest side of Huascarán has been called "one of the most unstable ice-covered areas in the Cordillera Blanca". Among the many glaciers and permanent icefields on Huascarán is "Glacier 511" located below the nearly vertical face of Huascarán's north peak. The glacier fills the head of the very steep Quebrada Armapampa ravine, which eventually flows into Río Llanguanuco. Beneath the snout of Glacier 511 the terrain slopes down at an average pitch of 23 degrees (in some places exceeding 70 degrees), with a total vertical drop of 3,000 m (9,800 ft) before reaching the more gently sloped valleys below, creating ideal conditions for any large falling mass of rock to move unobstructed at high speed.

=== Yungay before the disaster ===
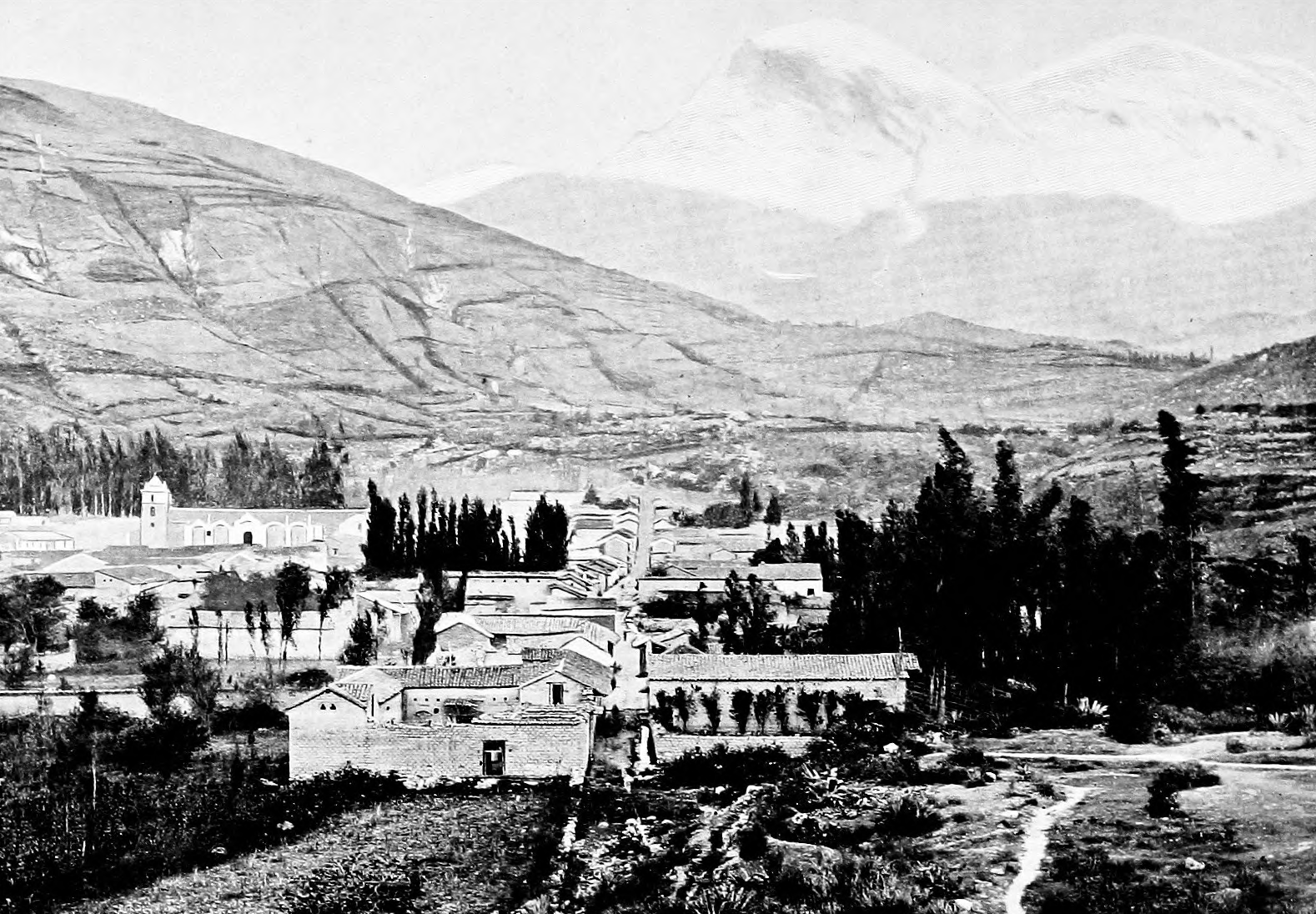
Yungay in 1907, with Huascarán in the background

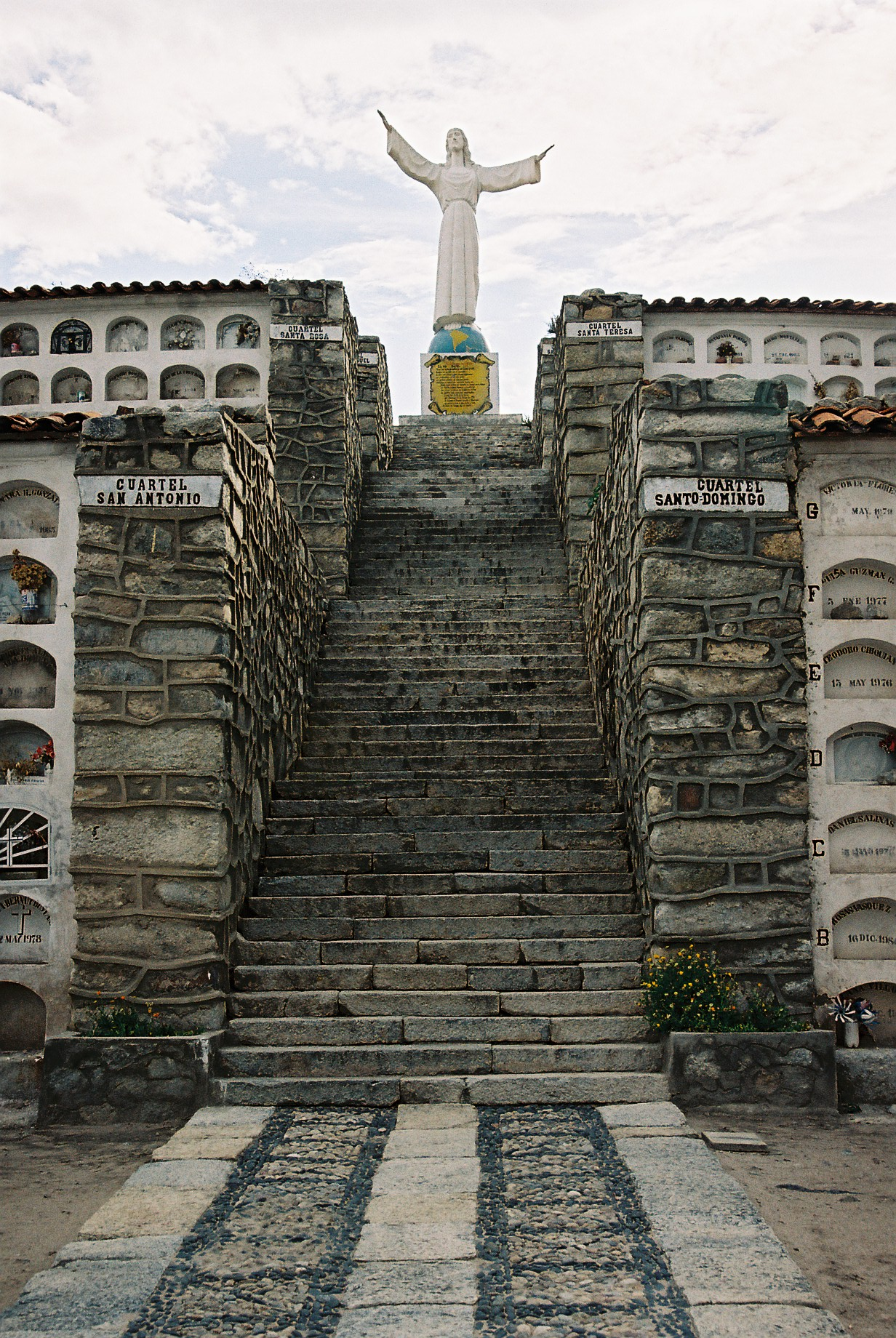
Upper level of the Yungay cemetery and Cristo Redentor statue

In the late 1960s, Yungay's permanent population was around 4,000 or 5,000, which swelled greatly on market and church days when thousands of visitors arrived from the surrounding villages. With the notable exception of the massive stone cathedral at the center of town, the city consisted predominantly of two or three-story adobe and wood structures with heavy tile roofs, dating from the Spanish colonial period. This fragile housing stock, typical of structures elsewhere in the Río Santa valley, was highly vulnerable to seismic activity. Other prominent features of Yungay included the central Plaza de Armas surrounded by palm trees, which hosted events including the fiesta of Santo Domingo, and the elevated cemetery, which was actually built on top of a pre-Inca burial mound which may be as old as 10,000 years.

In the years leading up to 1970, Yungay – sometimes nicknamed "Pearl of the Huaylas Corridor" – had become one of the most popular tourist destinations in Peru due to its picturesque location, architecture, and proximity to Huascarán and the Llanganuco lakes.

Yungay had been struck by disaster before; it was reported to be "almost completely wiped out by an avalanche" in 1872, implying an avalanche at least equal to the magnitude of the 1970 event.

=== 1962 Ranrahirca avalanche ===
On January 10, 1962, part of Glacier 511 collapsed, causing 10 million m^{3} of rock, ice and snow to crash down into Río Llanganuco. The slide destroyed nine villages and killed more than 4,000 people. The entire town of Ranrahirca, which was built on the Llanguanuco fan at the edge of the slide path, was flattened; some 2,900 people died in Ranrahirca alone. Residents had little to no warning, as less than four minutes passed from the beginning of the slide before the flow reached the Río Santa. Everything in the wave's path was destroyed, and corpses were washed as far as the Pacific Ocean, 100 km (62 mi) downstream.

This slide was not caused by an earthquake, nor were seven other large avalanches and debris flows that occurred in the Santa Valley between 1940 and 1970. Rather, the glacier had fractured under its own weight. Due to the steep slope of the underlying rock and lubrication by glacial melt, there was nothing to stop the ice from sliding downhill at high speed. In the wake of this and other glacier-related disasters in the Ashish region, notably glacial lake outburst floods that destroyed parts of Huaraz in the preceding two decades, the national government had tried to push forward "hazard zoning" which would limit development in flood and avalanche zones. However, these efforts were largely unsuccessful due to resistance by locals, who feared the economic and cultural disruption that would result from forced relocation.

=== Post-1962 observations and controversy ===
In September 1962, the Massachusetts Institute of Technology sponsored a glaciological expedition to assess the aftermath of the Ranrahirca slide. American climbers David Bernays and Charles Sawyer observed, in the aftermath of this slide, "a massive vertical slab of rock being undermined by Glacier 511" posing the threat of a much larger collapse. The overhanging cliff was as much as 1,000 m (3,300 ft) high in places and the rock was described as being "pervasively fractured." Although the risk to Yungay was remote, the town could be threatened if a "sufficiently large avalanche" were to spill over the ridge to its east. The Americans' findings were reported on September 27, 1962, in the El Expreso newspaper, under the headline "Dantesque Avalanche Threatens Yungay."

The mountaineers and scientists... [provided] a dramatic revelation that a gigantic avalanche three times larger than that of Ranrahirca threatens to dislodge, putting in danger Yungay, Mancos and the proposed site where they plan to rebuild the devastated Ranrahirca... It is hoped that authorities take preventative measures to save the lives of the flourishing Callejón de Huaylas populations.

Local authorities ordered this information to be retracted, and discouraged citizens from speaking about the threat, in order to prevent panic: "Anyone who spoke in favor of the Americans' conclusions would be charged under the Penal Code for disrupting public tranquility." The director of the regional Lakes Commission, Miguel Eliás Pizarro, was asked to "provide an expert analysis." Pizarro "dismissed the American mountaineers' statements as outlandish, hurried and uninformed" and stated that Yungay was in no danger, being well out of the path of the 1962 slide. Bernays and Sawyer were reportedly threatened with arrest, and they soon fled the country. Prior to that, Bernays had attended a public meeting in Huaraz where he called the Expreso coverage "exaggerated", though he did not deny the possibility that a large enough avalanche could affect Yungay.

This same glacier would be the origin of the much larger collapse that destroyed Yungay eight years later.

== Earthquake and landslide ==
At 3:23 PM on Sunday, May 31, 1970, the Ancash earthquake (also known as the Great Peruvian earthquake) struck off the coast of Peru with a moment magnitude of 7.9. The shaking dislodged a slab of rock about 800 m (2,600 ft) wide from the western face of Huascarán's north peak, at an elevation of roughly 5,600 to 6,200 m (18,400 to 20,300 ft). The rockfall occurred almost immediately after the shaking began, with witnesses comparing the sound to a gunshot or explosion. The fall triggered an "enormous dark cloud of dust" which rapidly blocked the view from below.

The rock fell some 600 m (2,000 ft) vertically before landing on Glacier 511 and sliding nearly 3 km (1.9 mi) down its surface, accumulating a large volume of firn snow as it went. The initial ice-rock avalanche volume was at least 25 million m^{3} (33 million yd^{3}), and grew rapidly in size as it fell down the steep Llanganuco valley, picking up large volumes of dirt, loose glacial moraine, water and uprooted trees. With area soils saturated near the end of the rainy season, and the large amount of snow and ice scraped off the glacier surface, the avalanche quickly liquefied into a fluid, fast-moving mudflow.

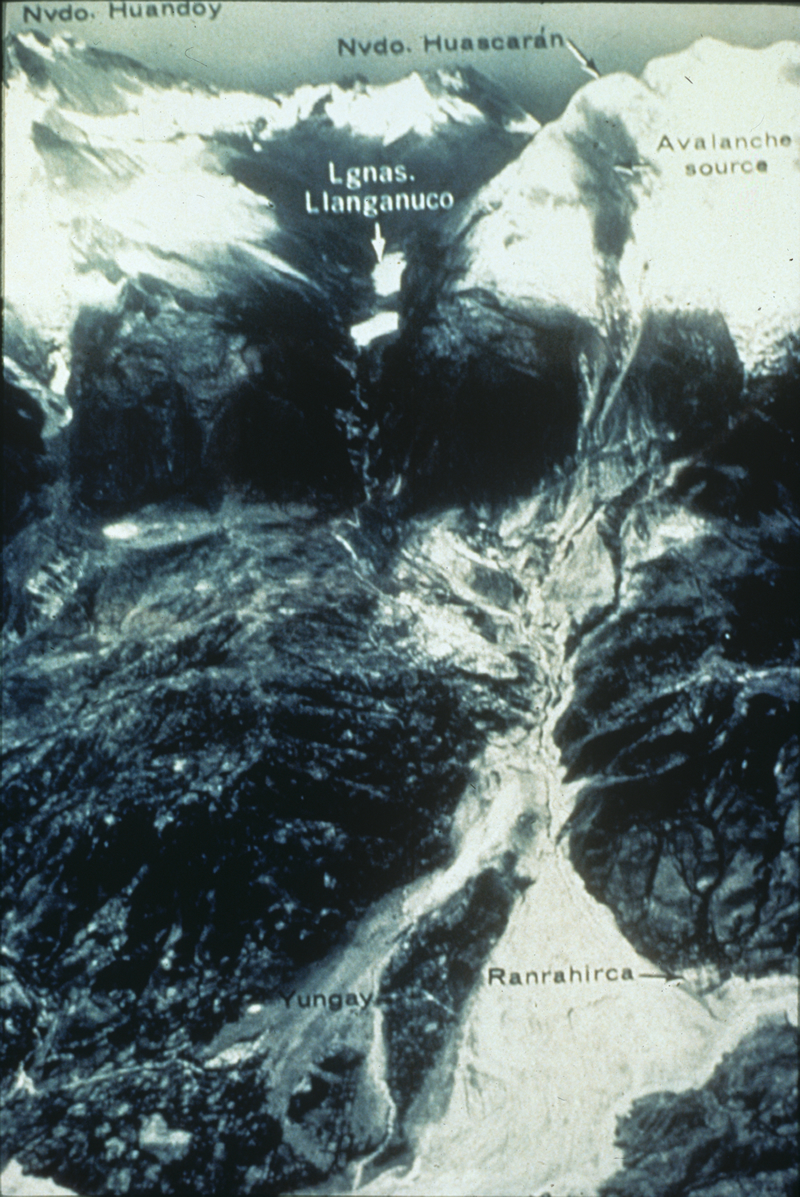
Aerial view of the damage, showing the origin point on Huascarán and debris fans in the valley below

The maximum volume of mudflow was as much as 50-100 million m^{3} (130 million yd^{3}), and it reached speeds of up to 435 km/h (270 mph). Some debris projectiles launched ahead of the main flow may have exceeded 1,100 km/h (680 mph). According to a U.S. Geological Survey report published the same year, the mudflow may have achieved its unusually high speed due to "air-cushioned flow", a mixture of snow, ice and entrapped air that allowed the bulk of the material to essentially float over the ground. The initial acceleration of the mass down the low-friction glacial surface was also a major factor, catapulting the material downhill at a much higher speed than if it had slid over bare rock or earth.

=== Destruction of Yungay ===
In Yungay, people rushed outside after the earthquake hit; many flocked to churches to shelter and pray. Most buildings in the city were damaged or destroyed by the earthquake, though initial casualties were low compared to the mudflow that followed. The mudflow struck Yungay, 13 km (8.1 mi) from the avalanche origin, an estimated 1 minute, 42 seconds after the earthquake began. Although the nearly 200 m (660 ft) hill of Cerro de Aira stood between Yungay and the Llanganuco valley, the mudflow struck the ridge at a high enough speed – some 170 km/h (110 mph) – that part of it leapt over the crest, first destroying the villages of Shillkop, Aira and Ongo before descending upon Yungay.

A large air blast preceded the debris flow, followed by a rain of boulders and large debris before the main, semi-liquid wave struck. The wind blast was "strong enough to throw people to the ground and in some places to topple trees." Giant rocks "bounced and rolled" towards Yungay, leaving huge craters in the ground and flattening buildings that had not been already destroyed by the earthquake. The mudflow itself was described by survivors as "rolling", "wavelike" or "a rolling confused motion." Due to the speed of the flow, there was no time to evacuate. Practically every man-made structure in Yungay except a few on the outskirts were destroyed, and thousands of people were killed instantly. Survivor Mateo Casaverde described the scene:

We heard a deep noise, different from the earthquake, but not so much so. It was coming from Huascarán and we saw between the mountain and Yungay a giant cloud of dust. The quake had caused an avalanche. Part of Huascarán was falling... You could see a giant wave of gray mud, about 60 metres (200 ft) high, about to hit the left hand side of the city. This wave was certainly not dust... The sky went dark. We looked around. Yungay and its many thousands of inhabitants had disappeared.

=== Effects elsewhere ===
The majority of the mudflow headed straight down Río Llanganuco, which formed the most direct path for the slide. The villages of Incayoc and Huashau, closest to the base of Huascarán, were struck first. A group of 14 Czechoslovak climbers on their way up the mountain were killed nearby. The entire Llanganuco delta area was destroyed, including the rebuilt town of Ranrahirca, where an estimated 1,800 people were killed. "An unknown, but probably large, number of additional casualties were sustained elsewhere in the extensive area covered by the debris lobe." As had occurred in Yungay, huge boulders were thrown hundreds of metres across the valley, destroying everything in their path. The largest single boulder found in the slide, near the site of Ranrahirca, weighed 14,000 tonnes (31,000,000 lb).

The slide dammed the Río Santa, causing it to back up in a 2 km (1.2 mi) long lake. Material traveled as much as 83 m (272 ft) vertically up the opposite bank, destroying part of Matacoto village, before reversing and falling back into the river with a thunderous roar. Survivors described the motion as "like a wave on the shore." Within thirty minutes the landslide dam overflowed, and debris and mud flowed downstream for some 100 km (62 mi) at speeds up to 35 km/h (22 mph), causing damage all along the river banks.

In Caraz, 11 km (6.8 mi) downstream of Yungay, the airport and much of the surrounding farmland were flooded, and a highway bridge at Choquechaca was destroyed. The dam of the Cañon del Pato hydroelectric plant was also destroyed, although the power station itself was unharmed. At Huallanca below Cañon del Pato, the river reportedly dried up for an hour after the earthquake, due to its temporary blockage upstream, then abruptly rose 20 m (66 ft) from its bed. After the water receded "dozens of corpses, and vehicles and other manmade materials" were found deposited in the flood zone. Large sections of railroad and highway between Huallanca and Chimbote were either buried or washed away, cutting off access to the region.

It reportedly took eight or nine days for the river to cut completely through the debris dam and restore its original course.

== Casualties and losses ==
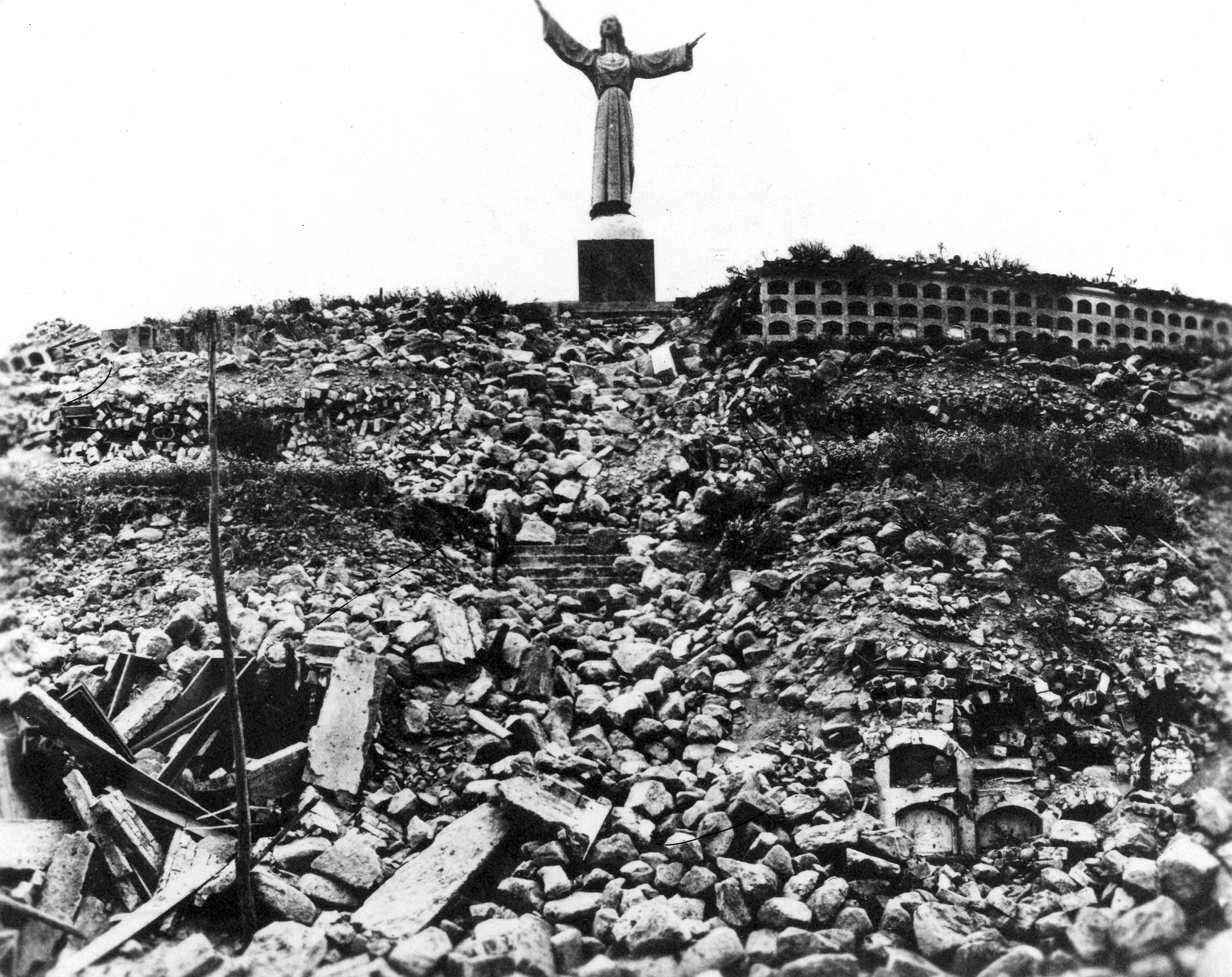
Statue of Christ at Cemetery Hill overlooking Yungay after the avalanche, many people sought refuge here

The number of deaths from the 1970 avalanche has been difficult to quantify; due to the sheer size of the devastated area and the depth to which the towns were buried, thousands of missing bodies were never found. Furthermore, the casualties in Yungay were greatly increased due to the disaster having occurred on Sunday – market day – when many people had come in from the countryside. Most estimates range between a total of 15,000 and 18,000 killed in Yungay and the surrounding villages, although some sources cite a death toll as high as 22,000 or 25,000.

Only about 400 people survived in Yungay proper, 300 of which were children, who had been attending a circus in the local stadium; reportedly a clown led them to higher ground just in time before the mudflow struck. Ninety-two people also survived by climbing an artificial hill at the town cemetery. These were the only structures in town that remained intact, along with "a statue of Jesus Christ with his arms outstretched, standing tall above the rubble" which remains today as a memorial to the dead. A photograph of four palm trees that once surrounded Yungay's main plaza, half buried in the mudflow but still standing, became symbolic of the disaster.

The debris covered a total area of 1,500 hectares (3,700 acres) and reached depths of up to 20 m (66 ft) in the Ranrahirca area; in places the flow spread as wide as 4.3 km (2.7 mi). Yungay town was buried under about 5 metres (16 ft) of debris. Much of the mud that initially buried the city drained away within a few days of the disaster, leaving a plain of larger rocks which remains today in much the same state.

== Aftermath ==
=== Relief efforts ===
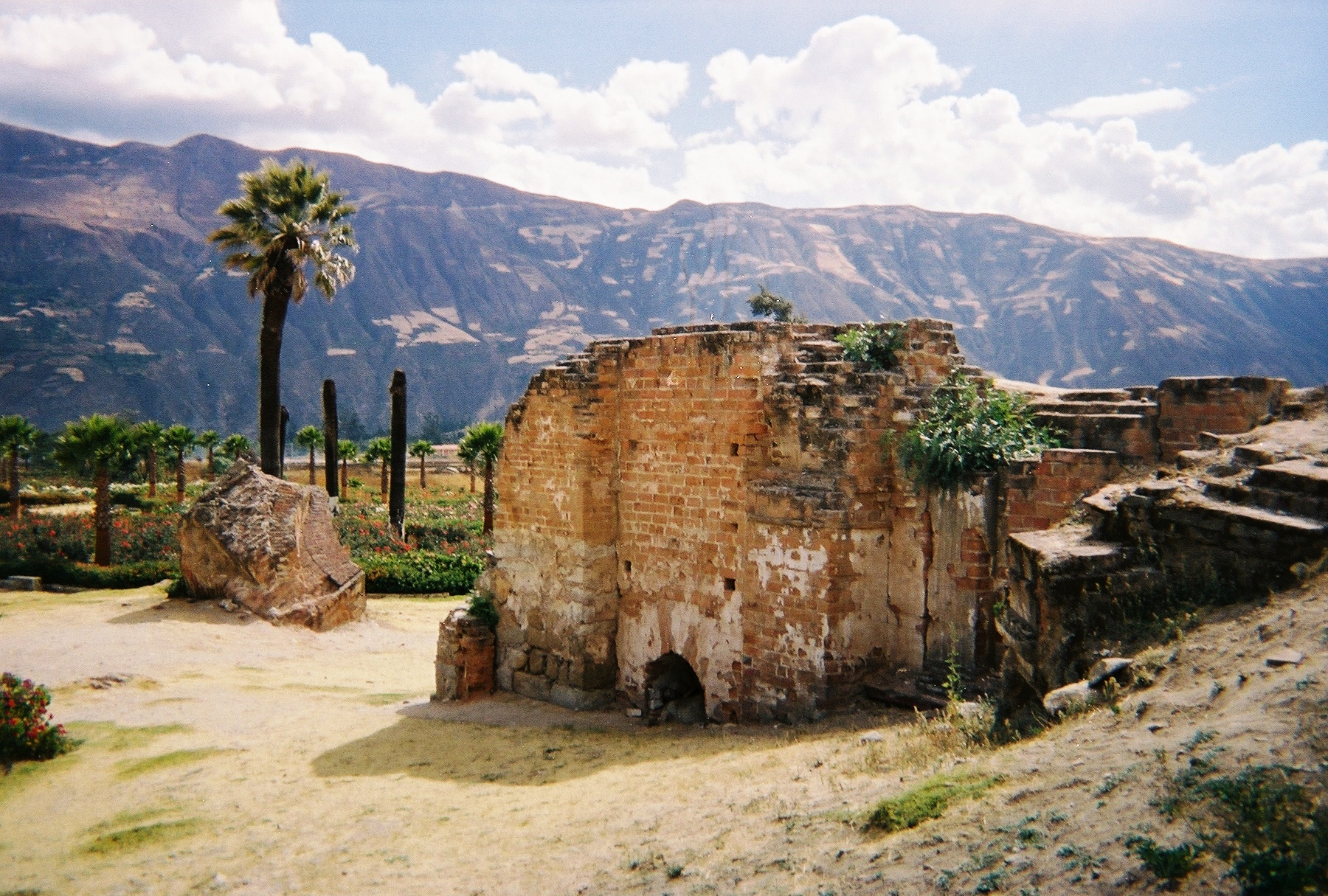
Ruins of the Yungay cathedral

Due to Yungay's cultural and economic importance as the capital of Yungay Province, many survivors not only from Yungay but the surrounding villages resisted government efforts to resettle them elsewhere. Within a year of the disaster, some 2,000 survivors had clustered in the refugee camp known as "Yungay Norte", only a few hundred metres north of the destroyed city. Although this location was much safer from landslides than old Yungay, it was geographically constrained – "aid personnel speculated that if the capital of the province were relocated there, it would soon outgrow the safe area and spill over into dangerous zones."

The national government created the Comisión de Reconstrucción y Rehabilitación de la Zona Afectada (CRYRZA) agency to oversee aid and reconstruction efforts in the areas affected by the Ancash earthquake. Soon after the disaster, authorities supervised repair of Yungay's irrigation systems which had been destroyed by the mudflow. However, the year's agricultural output still fell far short of normal. Relief efforts were hindered by the damage to roads and bridges in rough terrain; "it took two or three days for supplies to reach the upper Santa valley by road from Lima airport."

There was controversy over the distribution of aid, as urban dwellers felt they were not receiving enough compared to indigenous peasants. President Juan Velasco Alvarado saw the disaster as "a unique opportunity" to carry out his populist agenda, which aimed to erase socioeconomic divides in rural provinces such as Yungay. "For the urban elite accustomed to advantages over the indigenous population, equality was an insidious proposition." Yet for rural inhabitants, "it was a unique opportunity for social mobility in a frontier-like scenario."

=== Reconstruction ===
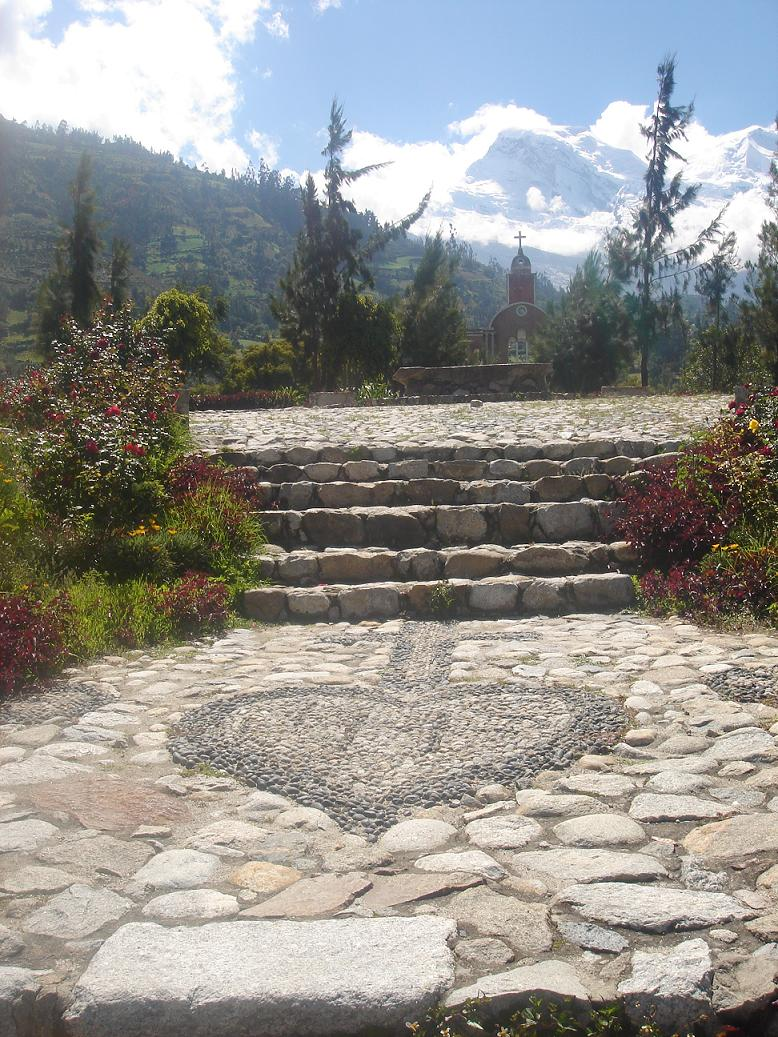
Monument at Yungay Viejo and view of Huascarán

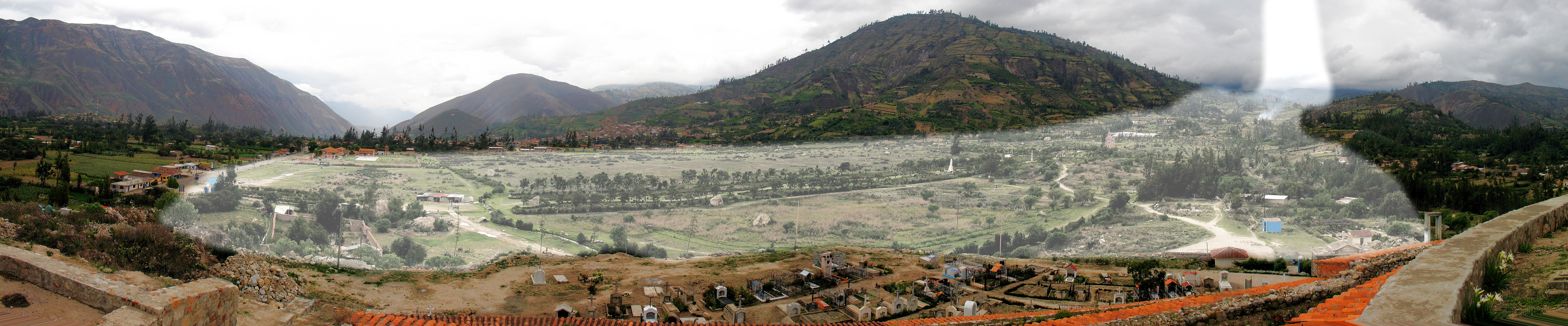
Yungay Viejo (2500 m) as seen from the cemetery hill. The light shaded area shows the location of the landslide (ice, mud, debris avalanche) on 31.05.1970, caused by an earthquake, in which a part of the western flank of Huascaran Norte broke (6652 m). Yungay Nuevo is behind the shaded area in the center.

In November 1970, authorities announced plans to relocate the provincial capital itself to a place called Tingua, 15 km (9.3 mi) away. This plan was poorly received, being far from the peasant farmers who depended on Yungay markets to sell their products and came to town for religious functions. Such an arrangement would also leave the urban population without nearby sources of food, goods and revenue (from renting of farmland). "The Tingua site for the new capital would have disrupted traditional social, economic and political patterns of interrelationships within the capital as well as between the rural and urban sectors of society. The Yungaino leaders were determined to avoid this disruptive project at all costs."

Ultimately, the national government began the construction of a permanent town at Yungay Norte, with significant international assistance. By 1975, Yungay Norte was simply known as "Yungay", with the site of the destroyed town known as "Yungay Viejo". The new city already had electricity, running water, clinics, schools, a church, and permanent housing. By the early 1990s Yungay had recovered to its pre-avalanche population. The social composition of the town was completely changed, especially since a large number of old Yungay's survivors ended up moving to coastal cities, to be replaced by migrants from rural areas.

The Peruvian government declared the site of Yungay a national cemetery, Campo Santo. Any excavation to recover the dead or search for artifacts is prohibited. A memorial in the shape of the original cathedral facade, a stone altar, and a large memorial garden and obelisk has been built on the site. Some survivors have erected headstones in the locations of their former homes. Visitors can still see a portion of the cathedral wall, the burial mound and statue of Christ, the four palm trees in the central plaza, and the wreckage of a bus.

In the wake of the disaster, the national government greatly increased funding for the mitigation and prevention of glacier-related hazards. May 31 was also declared National Disaster Education and Reflection Day, in honour of the earthquake and avalanche victims.

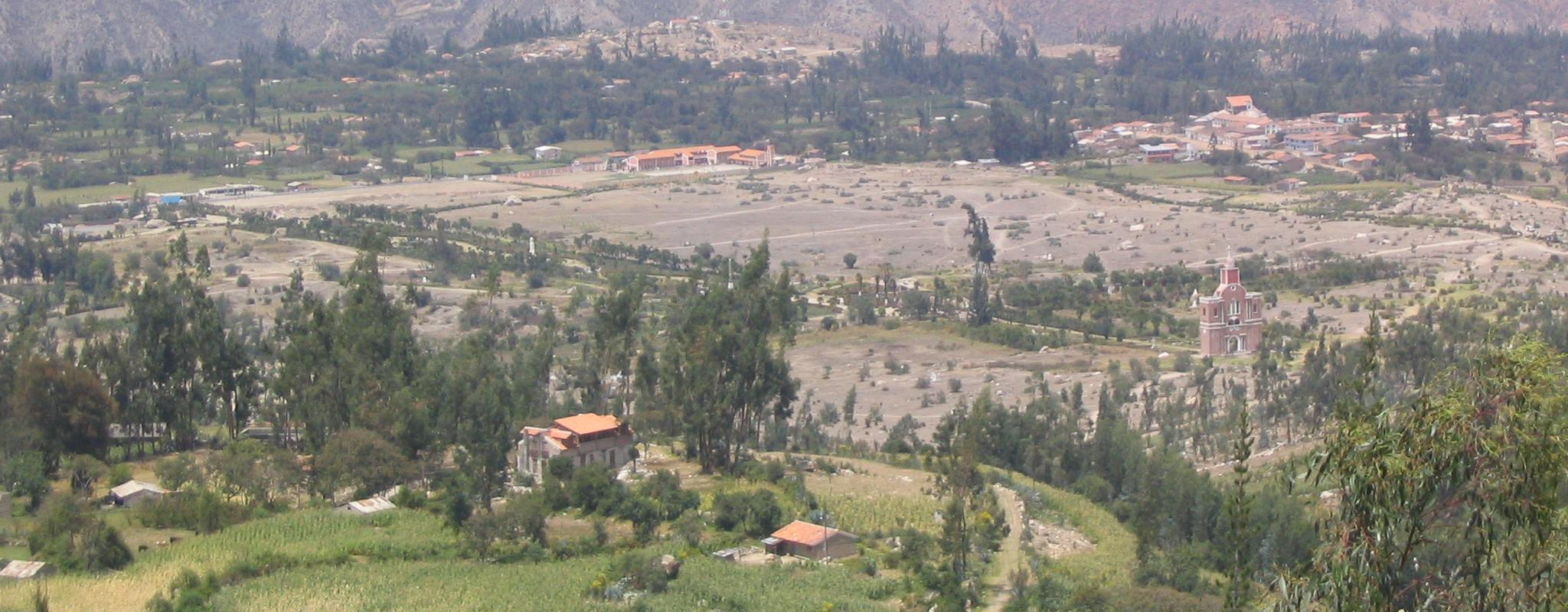
Overview of the old townsite, showing the extent of the memorial

== See also ==
- List of avalanches
- List of avalanches by death toll
- List of landslides
