= 1962 Ranrahirca Landslide =

Coordinates: 9°10′S 77°43′W

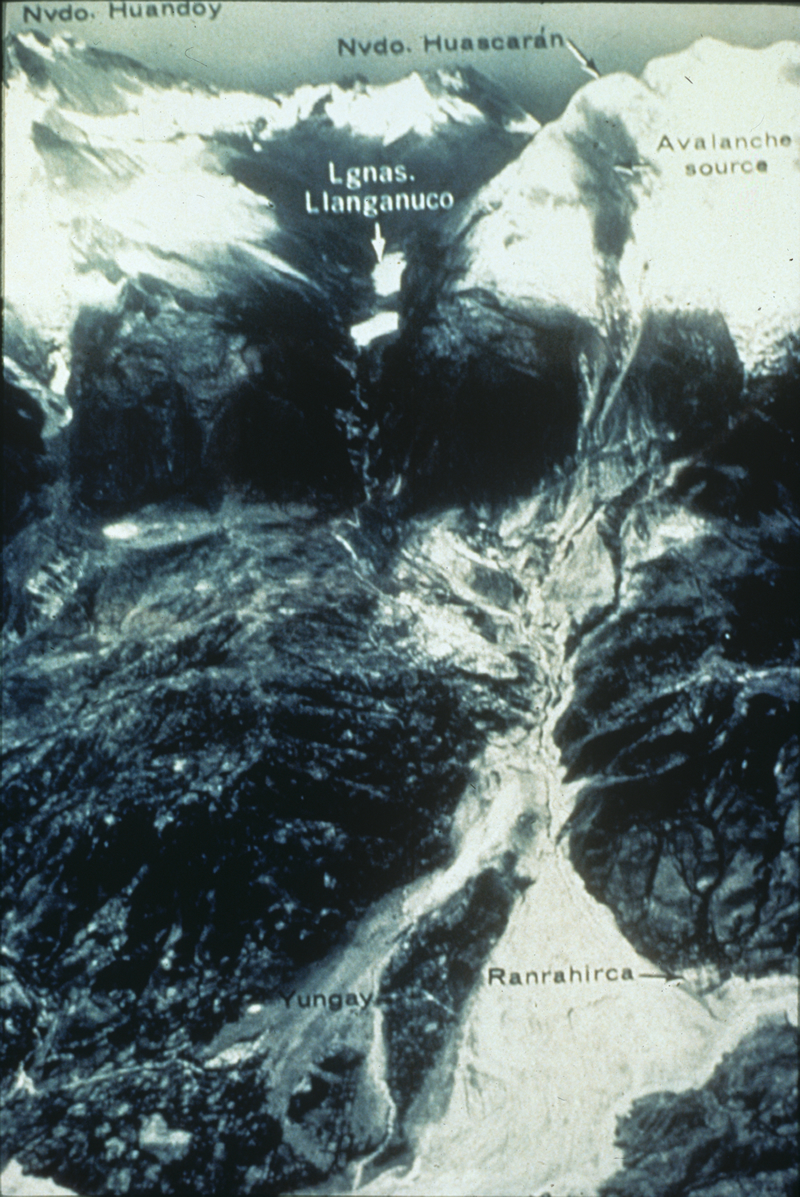
Photograph taken after the 1970 avalanche showing the buried towns of Yungay and Ranrahirca

The 1962 Ranrahirca Landslide was a deadly debris avalanche that affected the Ranrahirca District, alongside the river Santa, near Huascarán, the highest mountain in Peru. Ranrahirca has twice been devastated by massive avalanches of snow, rocks and mud originating on the slopes of Huascarán, triggered by earthquakes on 10 January 1962 and on 31 May 1970. Over two thousand people from the village perished in the 1962 avalanche, along with the inhabitants of seven nearby settlements. In total about 3,500 died in the disaster. About 20,000 people died in the 1970 avalanche set off by the second earthquake (known as the 1970 Ancash earthquake). 400 survived from the second disaster.

== See also ==
- Yungay, Peru
