= Yungay, Peru =

Town in Peru

Yungay Yungay Nuevo
- Town
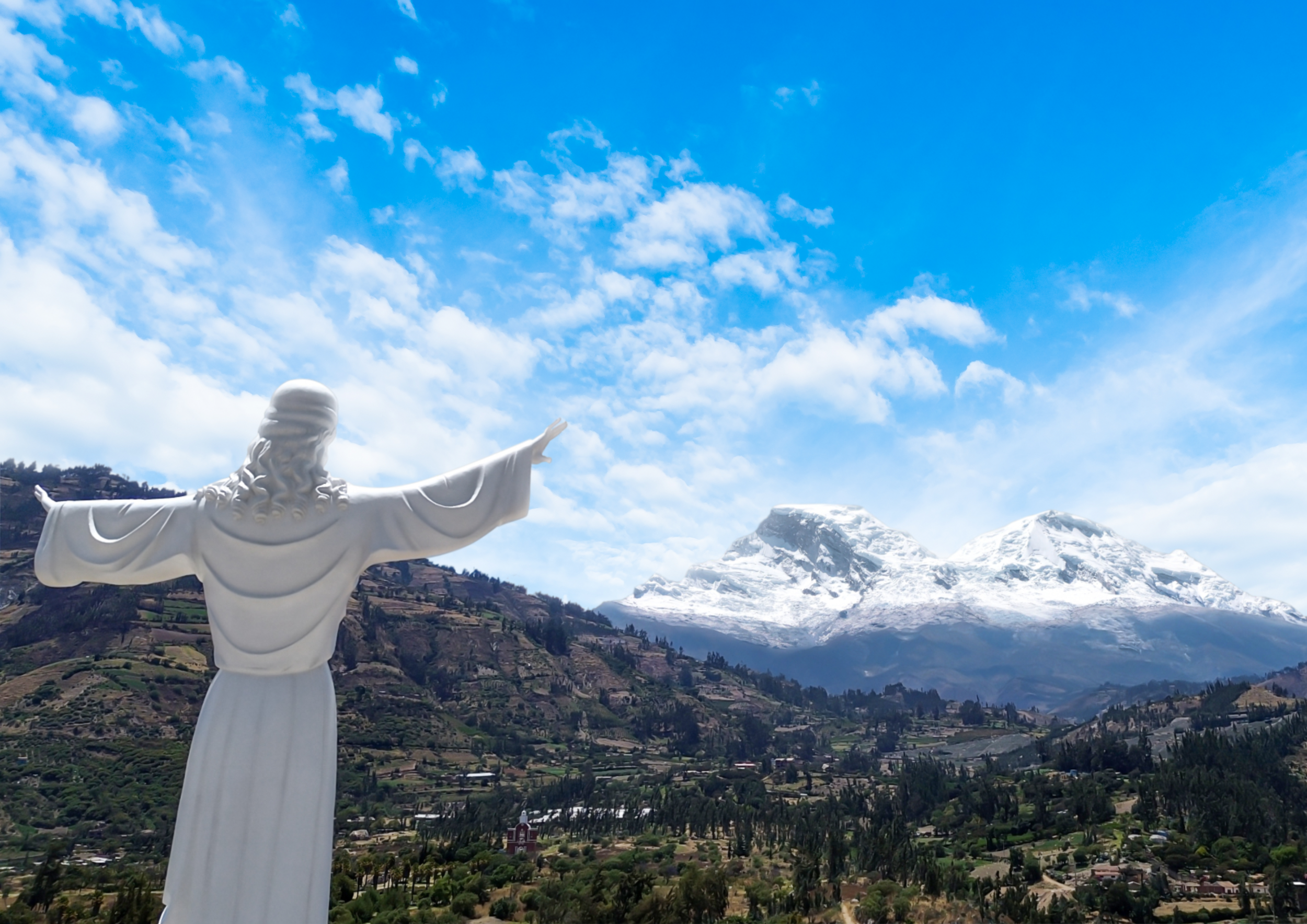
- Cemetery in Yungay

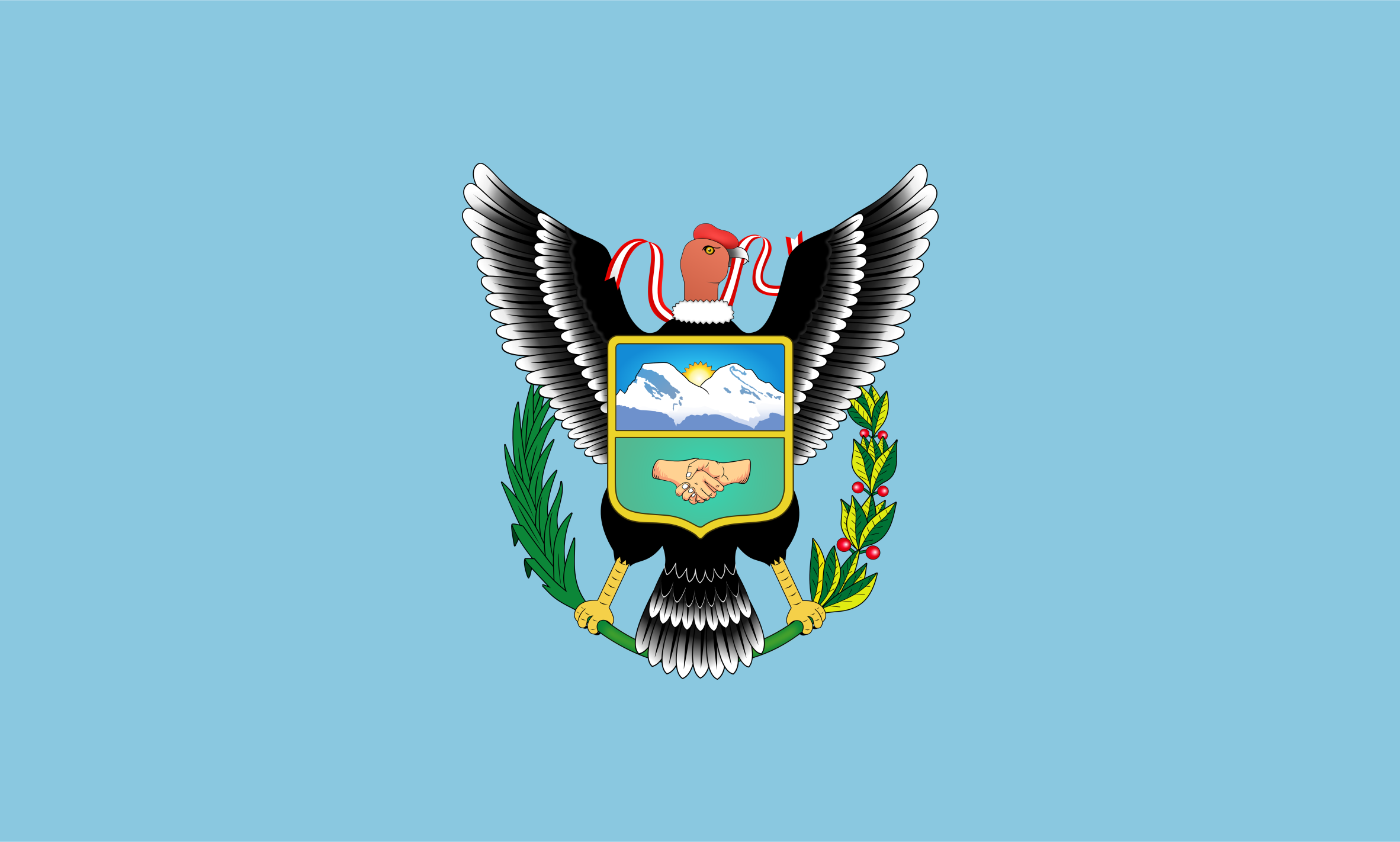
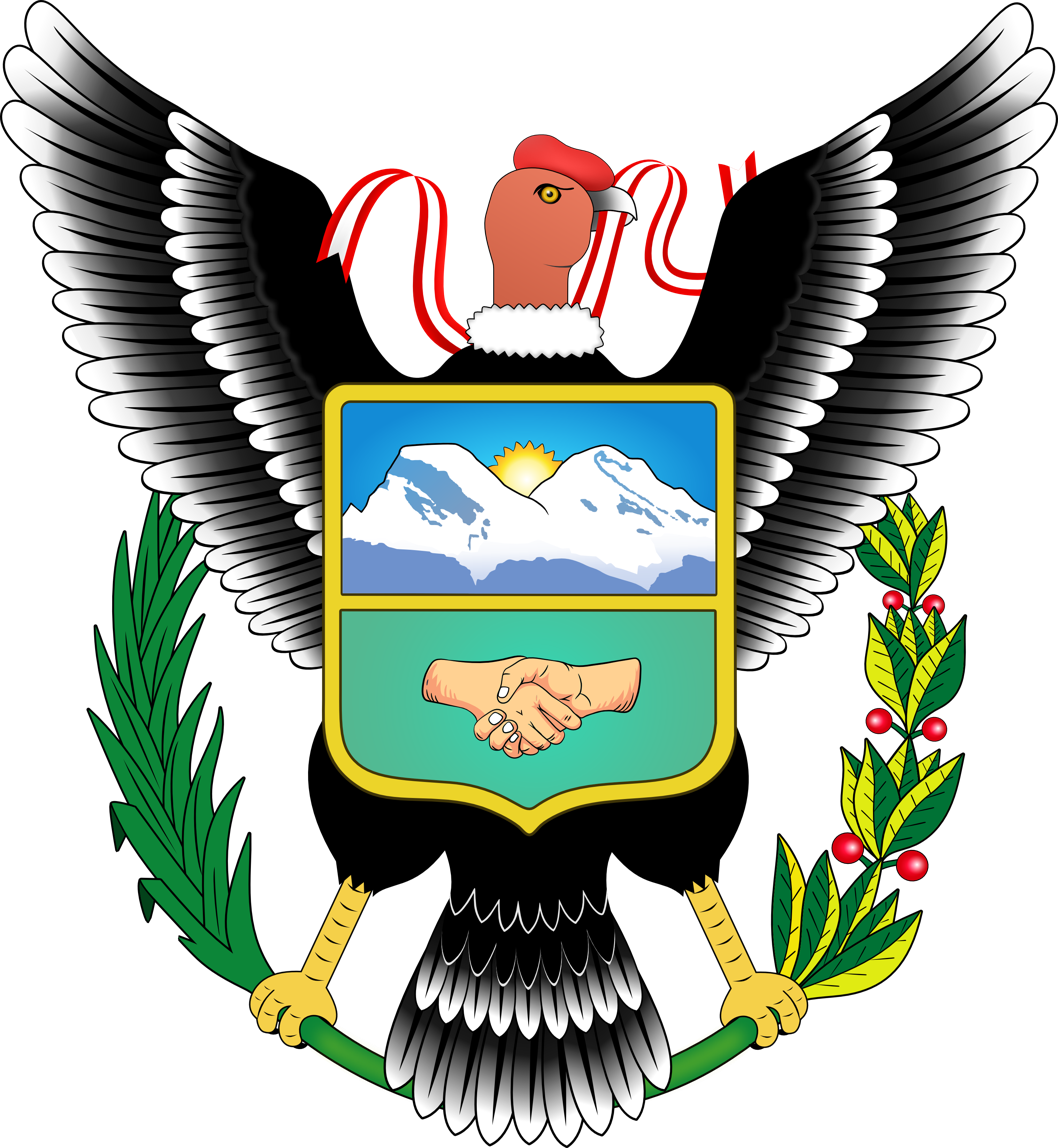
- Flag Seal
- Nickname: Yungay Hermosura
- Location within Peru
- Coordinates: 09°08′22″S 77°44′42″W
- Country: Peru
- Region: Ancash
- Province: Yungay
- District: Yungay
- Founded: 4 August 1540

Government
  - Mayor: José Antonio Romero Jara
- Elevation: 2,458 m (8,064 ft)

Population (2017)
  - Total: 20,070
- Time zone: UTC-5 (PET)
- Climate: BSk

Yungay, also known as Yungay Nuevo (Spanish for "New Yungay"), is a town in the Ancash Region in north central Peru, South America.

== Geography ==
Yungay is located in the Callejón de Huaylas on Río Santa at an elevation of approximately 2,500 meters, 450 km north of Lima, the country's capital. East of the small town are the mountain ridges of snow-covered Cordillera Blanca, with Huascarán, Peru's highest mountain, no more than 15 km east of Yungay.

Yungay is the capital of Yungay Province, as well as the main town in the Yungay District. While the town counts approximately 10,000 inhabitants (2010 projection based on 2007 census data), Yungay Province has a population of 60,000 (2000 estimate). The Province of Yungay occupies part of the Callejón de Huaylas, the Conchucos Valley (Yanama), the coast of Ancash (Quillo) and the Huascarán National Park.

== History ==
The United Restoration Army, a Chilean-Peruvian army during the War of the Confederation, defeated the army of the Peru-Bolivian Confederation during the Battle of Yungay on 20 January 1839, marking the dissolution of the short-lived confederacy.

=== 1962 avalanche ===
On 11 January 1962 an avalanche from Huascarán destroyed Ranrahirca and eight other villages in which an estimated 4,000 were killed. Yungay was saved.

=== Ancash earthquake ===
In 1962, two American scientists, David Bernays and Charles Sawyer, had reported seeing a massive vertical slab of rock being undermined by a glacier on mount Huascarán Norte, which threatened to fall and cause the obliteration of Yungay. According to Sawyer, when this was reported in the Expreso newspaper (27 September 1962), the government ordered them to retract or face prison, and they fled the country. Citizens were forcibly prevented from speaking of an impending disaster. Eight years later, the prediction came true.

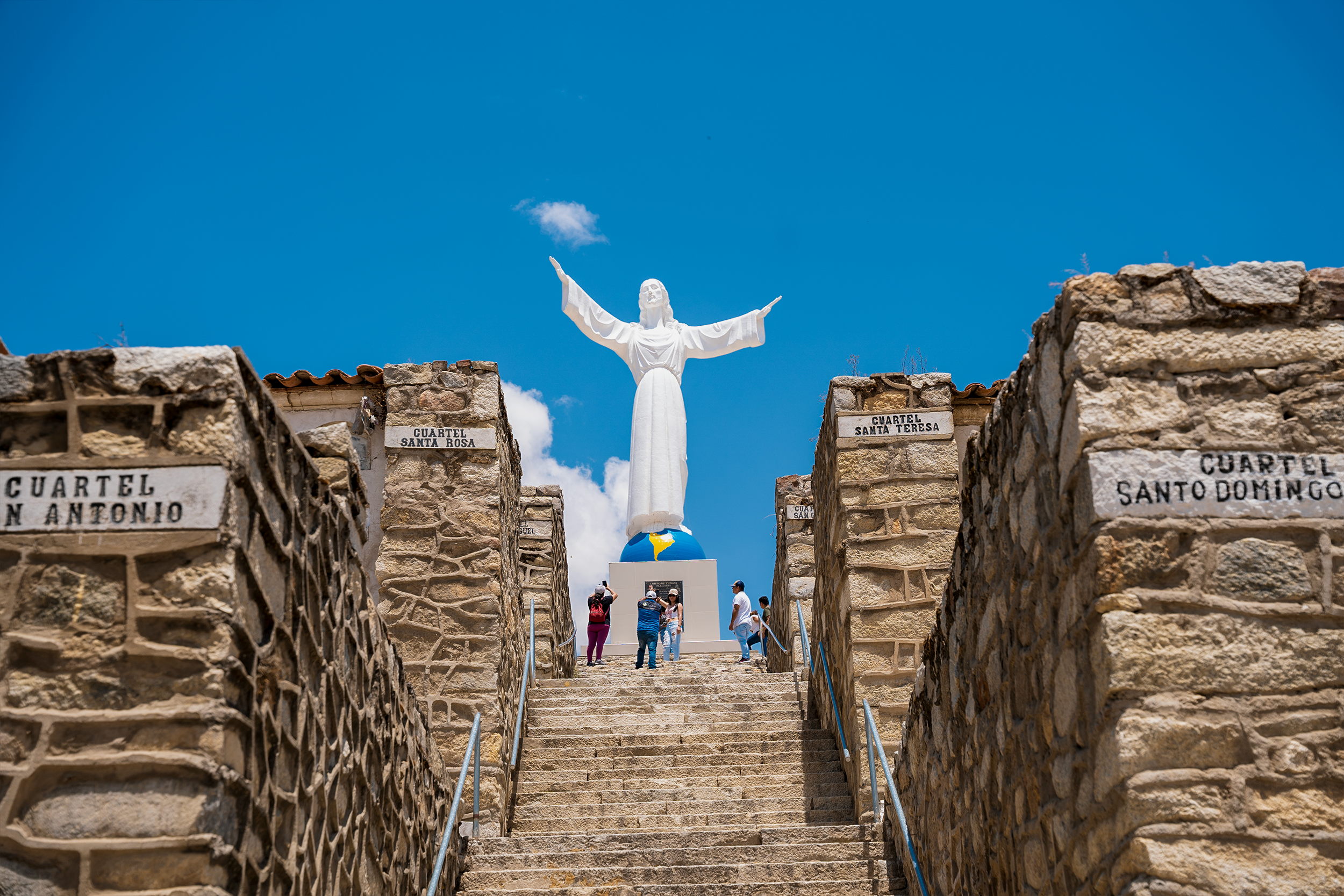
Cemetery in Yungay

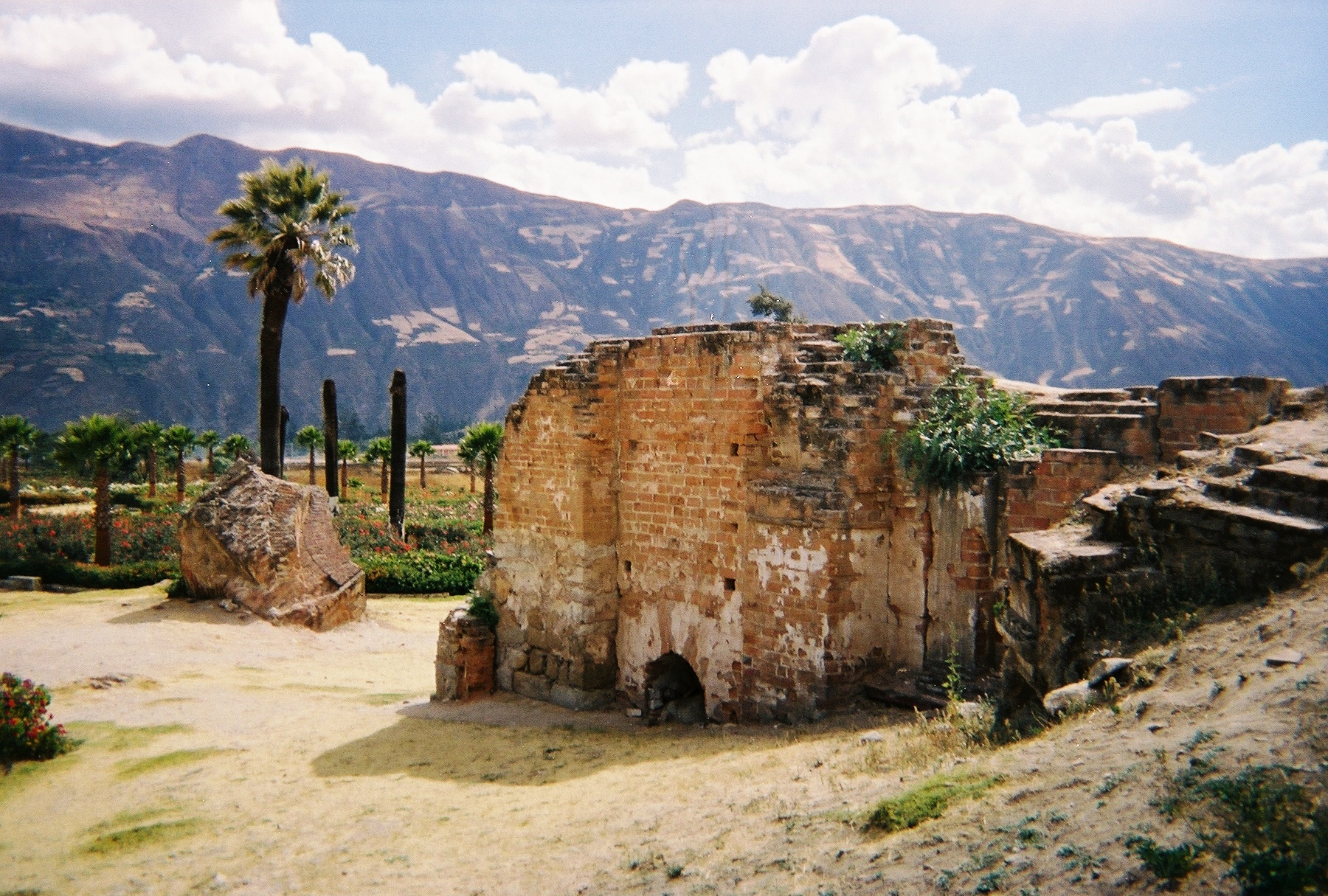
The remnants of Yungay's town church after the landslide

On 31 May 1970, the Ancash earthquake caused a substantial part of the north side of a mountain, Nevado Huascarán, to collapse and an unstable mass of glacial ice about 800 meters across at the top of Nevado Huascarán to fall. This caused a debris avalanche, burying the town of Yungay and killing 20,000 people (400 survived). More than 50 million cubic meters of debris slid approximately 15 kilometers downhill at an angle of about 14 degrees. Speeds between 340 mph to 620 mph (540-1000 km/h) were achieved. Most of the survivors were in the cemetery and stadium at the time of the earthquake, as these zones were the highest in town.

The Peruvian government has forbidden excavation in the area where the old town of Yungay is buried, declaring it a national cemetery. The current town was rebuilt 2 km (1 mi) north of the destroyed city.

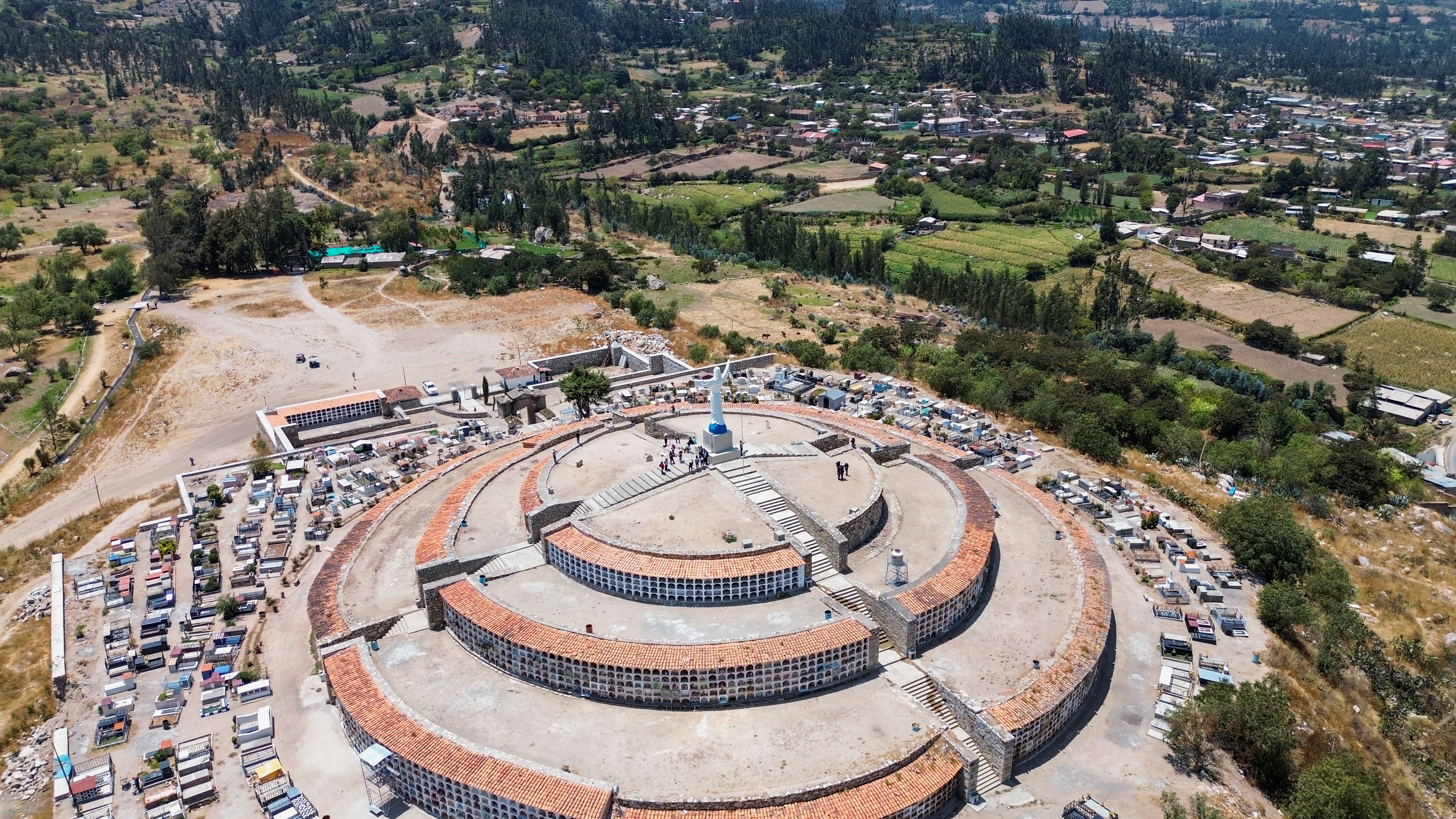
The old cemetery.

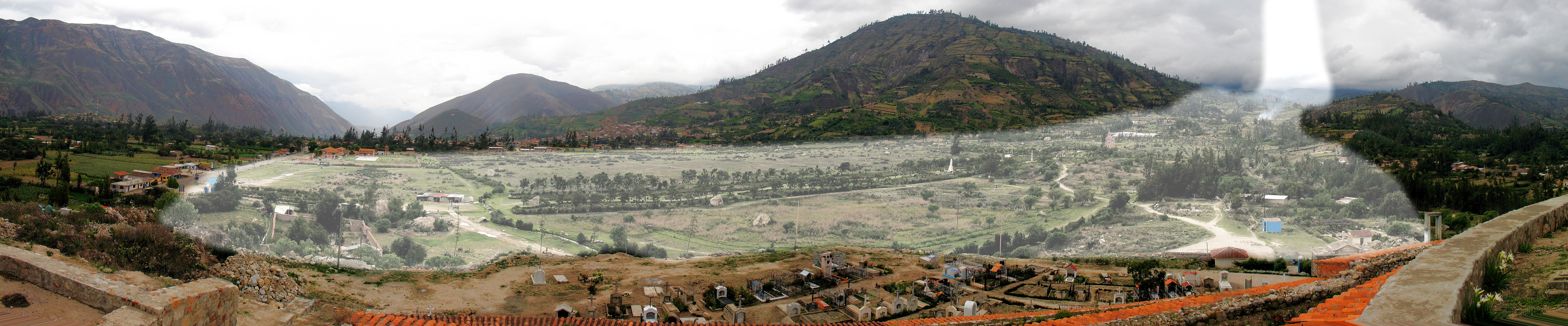
Yungay Viejo (2500 m, 8200 ft) as seen from the cemetery hill. The tinted area shows the location of the landslide caused by an earthquake on 31 May 1970, in which a part of the western flank of Huascaran Norte (6652 m, 21800ft) collapsed. Yungay Nuevo is behind the shaded area in the center.

== Climate ==
Climate data for Yungay, elevation 2,527 m (8,291 ft), (1995–2010)
Month	Jan	Feb	Mar	Apr	May	Jun	Jul	Aug	Sep	Oct	Nov	Dec	Year
Mean daily maximum °C (°F)	24.5 (76.1)	23.9 (75.0)	23.8 (74.8)	23.9 (75.0)	24.7 (76.5)	24.5 (76.1)	25.1 (77.2)	25.3 (77.5)	25.4 (77.7)	25.1 (77.2)	24.3 (75.7)	24.3 (75.7)	24.6 (76.2)
Daily mean °C (°F)	16.1 (61.0)	16.0 (60.8)	15.6 (60.1)	15.5 (59.9)	15.7 (60.3)	14.6 (58.3)	14.9 (58.8)	15.3 (59.5)	16.6 (61.9)	16.7 (62.1)	16.0 (60.8)	16.0 (60.8)	15.8 (60.4)
Mean daily minimum °C (°F)	8.6 (47.5)	9.2 (48.6)	8.9 (48.0)	8.6 (47.5)	8.2 (46.8)	6.4 (43.5)	6.5 (43.7)	6.6 (43.9)	7.5 (45.5)	8.3 (46.9)	8.3 (46.9)	8.4 (47.1)	8.0 (46.3)
Average precipitation mm (inches)	46.1 (1.81)	71.2 (2.80)	82.4 (3.24)	40.6 (1.60)	6.1 (0.24)	1.2 (0.05)	0.2 (0.01)	0.6 (0.02)	7.4 (0.29)	17.4 (0.69)	24.0 (0.94)	26.6 (1.05)	323.8 (12.74)
Source 1: Universidad Nacional Federico Villarreal
Source 2: Institut de recherche pour le développement (precipitation)

== See also ==
- Ancash Region
- Yungay Province
