= Pomabamba (disambiguation) =

Pomabamba (possibly from Quechua puma cougar, puma, pampa a large plain, "cougar plain") can refer to:

- Pomabamba, a town in Peru
- Pomabamba Province, a province in the Ancash Region, Peru
- Pomabamba District, a district in the Pomabamba province, Peru
- Pomabamba, a mountain in Peru
