= Dance in Peru =

Multicultural Peruvian dances

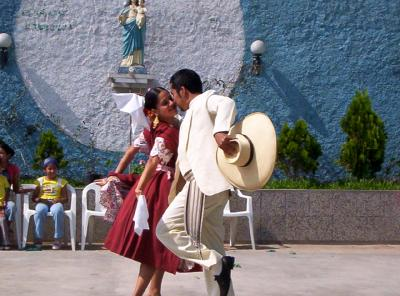
Marinera Norteña, one of the most representative dances in Peru.

Dance in Peru is an art form primarily of native origin. There are also dances that are related to agricultural work, hunting and war. In Peru dancing bears an important cultural significance. Some choreographies show certain Christian influence.

== Types of dances ==
- The most internationally known dance in Peru is the Marinera Norteña. This dance represents a man's courting of a young woman. There are local variants of this dance in the Lima Region and the other regions of the country.
- Ancash is a dance performed in Piscobamba (Ancash Region), on the occasion of the feast of the Virgin of Mercy, on the 25th, 26th and 27 September.
- Apu Inka is a dance which re-enacts the capture of the Inca by the Spanish invaders.
- Ch'unchu is a dance performed at festivals of the Cusco Region.
- Danzantes de Levanto, a typical dance from the Amazonas Region.
- El Vals Criollo (Vals peruano) is a subgenre and musical adaptation of the original European waltz, originated in Peru or also called a genre of Afro-Peruvian Creole music.
- Huaconada (Wanka) is a ritual dance that is represented in the town of Mito, Concepción Province, Junín Region, located in the Central Andes of Peru.
- Qhapaq Qulla is a dance performed at festivals of the Cusco Region.
- Supaypa wasin tusuq (Quechua for "dancer of the devil's house") or Danza de tijeras (Spanish for "dance of scissors") is an indigenous dance native to the region of Ayacucho, no relation to the highlands, with musical framework provided by violin and harp, which later spread to the Huancavelica and Apurímac Regions.
- Tarkada is a dance performed during the carnival festival in the Tacna Region in Peru.
- Tondero, also known as Marinera of Alto Piura, Piura yunga or (Morropón). It predates the zamacueca, and with much gypsy influence in its beat, singing tragic and repetitive guitar tundete, or black African influence in its chorus and rhythm (using an instrument made from a dried gourd) and Andean in its rather shrill tone.
- Wari, a traditional dance of the Ancash Region.
- Waylas/Huaylas (Walyash/Huaylarsh, Quechua pronunciation: [ˈwajlas̠]) is a dance from the Mantaro Valley in the department of Junin, in the central Andean part of Peru. It is a very lively and cheerful dance, characterized by the energy and jumping of the dancers. It is danced by pairs of dancers. It originated in association with the potato harvest.
- Wititi is a native Peruvian folk dance from Tapay district, Province of Caylloma, Arequipa region in southern Peru. This dance has now spread and is danced in the festivities of many villages the Colca Canyon. Witi Witi in Quechua means "making love"
- Zamacueca is music and a dance that originated in the Viceroyalty of Peru in colonial times, taking its roots from African, Spanish, and Andean rhythms.

== Amazonas Region ==
=== La Chumaichada ===
La Chumaichada originated in Chachapoyasis and is known as "the dance of Chachapoyas". No holiday or celebration is complete if it is not danced.

The music is probably of Indian origin, but the choreography has a French origin stemming from "Los Lanceros" (the lancers), a dance introduced in Chachapoyas by the bishop of the diocese at that time, monsignor Emilio Lissón, of French origin. It has been said that he had so much influence that the city became Frenchified during his time.

=== Los Danzantes de Levanto ===
Levanto is a little town about 10 km from Chachapoyas, whose "dancers" form a very well trained showy group of thirteen cholos, guided by a "pifador" (a person who whistles) who plays the antara and a small drum called the tinya simultaneously.

They wear a white shirt of wide and long sleeves, a black vest adorned with red ribbons and black trousers, and a crown of showy peacock feathers. Their presence is important in all the big celebrations of the region.

Other well-known dances performed in diverse localities are:

- The "Conchiperla", in which the man gives a handkerchief to his partner; he must keep a knee on the ground and must drink a glass of liqueur if he fails.
- The "Trapichillo", danced by four couples holding their right hands and turning anticlockwise.
- The "Quinsamana", in which insult compliments are mixed.

=== Carnaval in Amazonas ===
The "carnival music" that is played is euphoric. It is similar to the huayno. Pairs dance forming the pandilla (a kind of dance) around the humishas - trees adorned with quitasueños, small mirrors, ornamental chain stitches and pennants. These trees are filled with gifts, including live animals, which the guests take when the trees are knocked down at the end of the celebration.

The pair who fell the humisha in a Mardi Gras celebration have to make a new humisha the next year.

== See also ==
- Culture of Peru
