= Moseño =

Bolivian wooden flute

- Other names: Mohoseño, Mosenjo, Mosenyo
- Classification: woodwind

The Moseño (also called the Mohoseño, Mosenjo, or Mosenyo) is a Bolivian wooden flute, traditionally made of bamboo. It is characterized by 6 finger holes, an additional 4 tone holes, and a side chamber in which air is blown into to produce sound. It is not as well-known as other South American flutes such as the Quena or Tarka, but it was a very significant part of indigenous South American culture. It is commonly used today during yoga, reiki, certain forms of meditation, and other spiritual procedures, as well as in Andean folk music. There are many different size varieties of this instrument, ranging from soprano to bass.

== Similar instruments ==
- the Quena, an indigenous Andean woodwind instrument
- the Fujara, a Slovak overtone harmonic woodwind
- the Tarka, an Andean soprano flute
- the Pinqillu, a small one-handed Andean flute
