= Yungay District =

Yungay Yunkay
- District
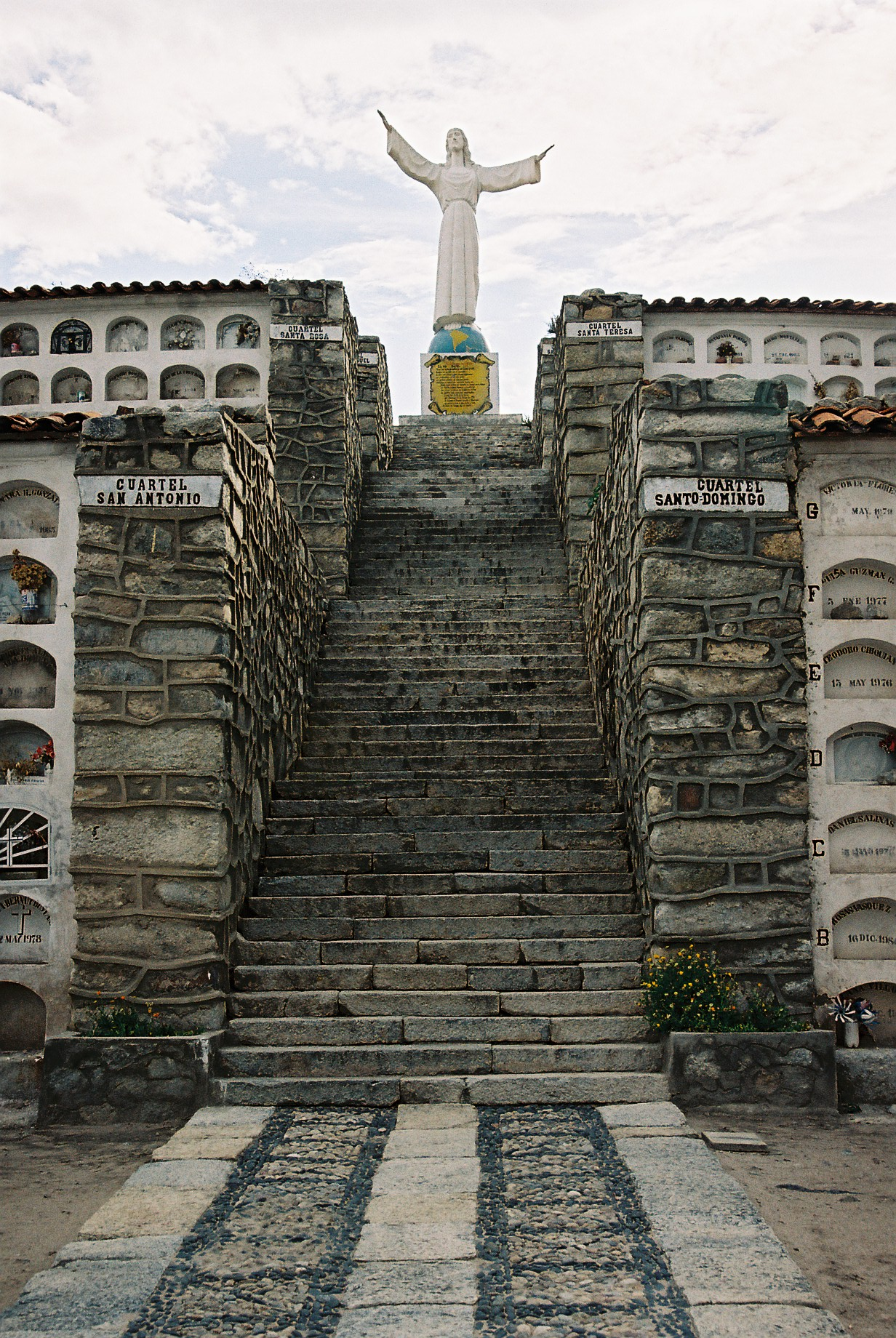
- Yungay cemetery
- Interactive map of Yungay
- Coordinates: 9°8′21.38″S 77°44′43.88″W
- Country: Peru
- Region: Ancash
- Province: Yungay
- Founded: October 28, 1904
- Capital: Yungay

Government
  - Mayor: Fernando Ciro Casio Consolación

Area
  - Total: 276.68 km^{2} (106.83 sq mi)
- Elevation: 2,458 m (8,064 ft)

Population (2017)
  - Total: 20,070
  - Density: 72.54/km^{2} (187.9/sq mi)
- Time zone: UTC-5 (PET)
- UBIGEO: 022001

Yungay district is a district in the Province of Yungay in the Ancash region, Peru. It was created by law on October 28, 1904.

== Geography ==
The Cordillera Blanca traverses the province. Waskaran, the highest elevation of Peru, lies on the border to the Carhuaz Province. Other mountains are listed below:

- Chakrarahu
- Chopicalqui
- Puchkayuq Punta
- Rukutu Punta
- Tullparahu
- Yanaphaqcha
- Yanarahu (or Ruriqucha)
- Yanarahu (Yanama-Yungay)

== History ==
The district was struck and many towns and villages were destroyed by the earthquake and alluvium on May 31, 1970, as can be seen from the Callejón de Huaylas towards the north. Huge amounts of rock and soil completely cover houses, buildings and temples of old towns like Ranrahirca and Yungay. In Yungay alone almost 70 thousand inhabitants died and are covered by the rocks and soil.

== Location ==
9° 8'21.38"S, 77°44'43.88"W Towards the west, at the cemetery at the back of the hill, a big sculpture of Jesus is located. Towards the East, the snow summit of the Huascarán appears. Huascarán was one of the sources of rock and snow that covered the town of Yungay in the 1970 earthquake. Continuing towards the north, in a space defended by the hills against possible new alluviums that might come from the Huascarán mountain, the new city of Yungay has been raised.

In the surroundings, the Pan de Azúcar hill (Sugar loaf hill) raises, where in 1839 the Battle of Yungay took place, next to the stream of the Ancash river. In this place, the Peru-Bolivian Confederation was concluded, after the Bolivian general Santa Cruz's forces were defeated. This battle gave the name of Ancash to this region, which was previously called Huaylas..

The zone of Yungay, that has a moderate climate, is propitious for hunting tarucas, pigeons, vizcachas, and ducks, as well as for the fishing of trout.

In Tingua, a suspension bridge that crosses the Santa river is raised, with a length of 75 m. This bridge and an access road join Tingua with the communities of Shupluy, Cascapara and Ecash.

== Ethnic groups ==
The people in the district are mainly indigenous citizens of Quechua descent. Quechua is the language which the majority of the population (57.02%) learnt to speak in childhood, 42.80% of the residents started speaking using the Spanish language (2007 Peru Census).

== See also ==
- Llankanuku Lakes
