= Yanarrajo =

Mountain in Peru

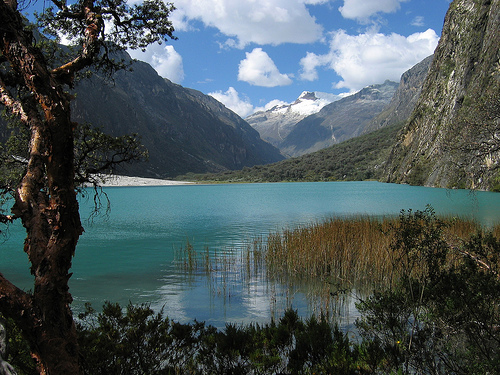
- The Llanganuco Lakes with the snow-covered Yanapaccha in the background and the snowless Yanarrajo on the right

Highest point
- Elevation: 5,055 m (16,585 ft)
- Coordinates: 9°02′14″S 77°35′16″W

Geography
- Location within Peru
- Location: Peru, Ancash Region
- Parent range: Andes, Cordillera Blanca

Yanarrajo (possibly from Quechua yana black, rahu snow, ice, mountain with snow, "black snow peak" is a mountain in the Cordillera Blanca in the Andes of Peru, about 5,055 metres (16,585 ft) high. It is situated in the Ancash Region, Yungay Province, in the districts Yanama and Yungay. Yanarrajo lies in the Huascarán National Park, south-west of Yanapaccha, near the Llanganuco Lakes.
