= Puka Ranra =

Puka Ranra or Pukaranra (Quechua puka red, ranra stony; stony ground, "red, stony ground", Hispanicized spellings Puca Ranra, Pucaranra) may refer to:

- Pukaranra, a mountain on the border of the provinces of Carhuaz and Huaraz, Ancash Region, Peru
- Puka Ranra (Arequipa), a mountain in the Arequipa Region, Peru
- Puka Ranra (Apurímac-Ayacucho), a mountain on the border of the Apurímac Region and the Ayacucho Region, Peru
- Puka Ranra (Yungay), a mountain in the Yungay Province, Ancash Region, Peru
