= Yaynu =

Archeological Site in Peru

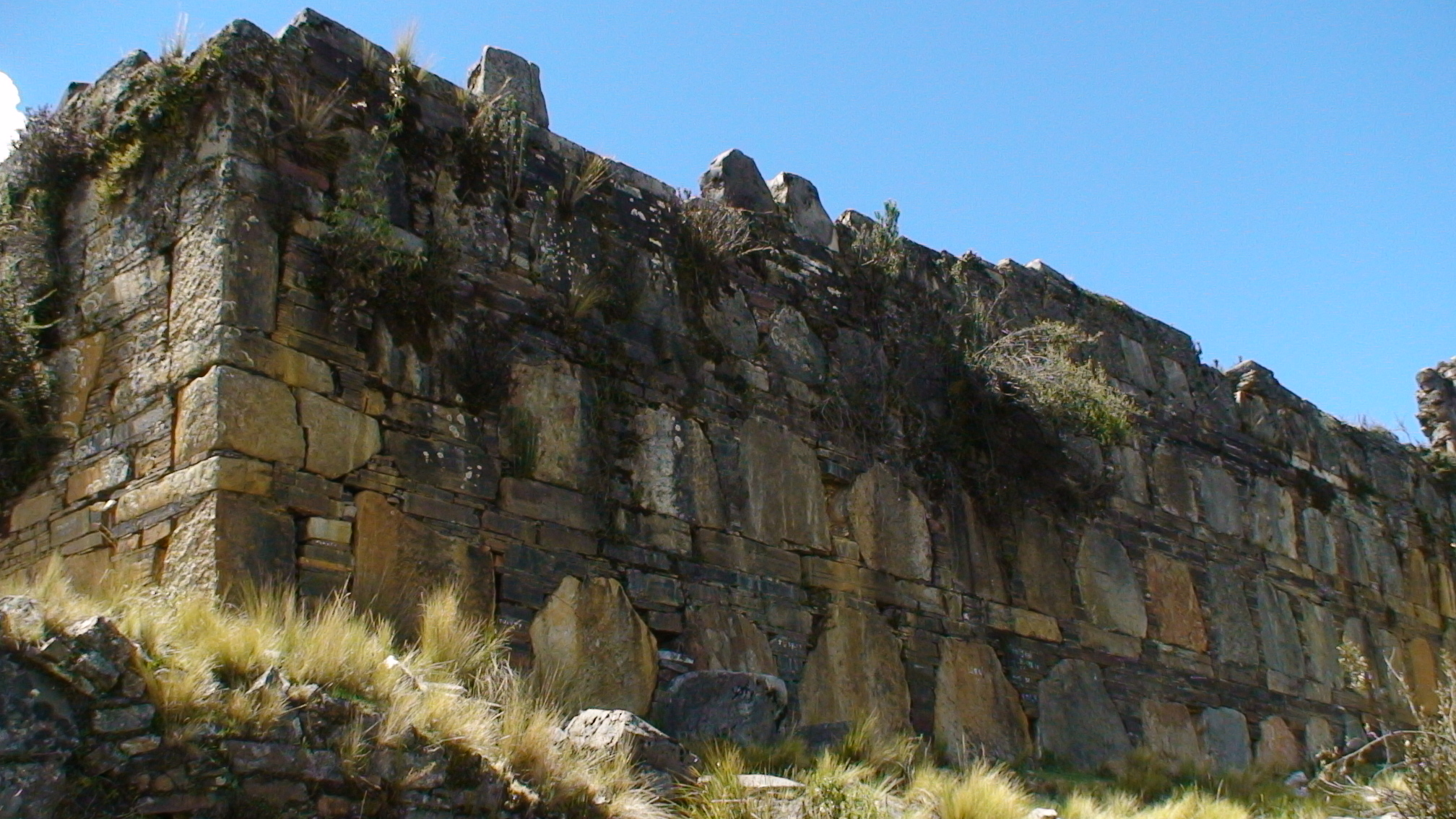
- Stonework at Yaynu
- Interactive map of Yaynu
- 8°53′12″S 77°27′22″W
- Location: Peru, Ancash Region, Pomabamba Province

Site notes
- Height: 4,000 metres (13,123 ft)

Yaynu (Hispanicized spellings Yaino, Yayno) is an archaeological site in Peru. It lies in the Ancash Region, Pomabamba Province, Huayllan District. It is a hilltop settlement that is considered the most important evidence of the so-called Recuay culture in the Ancash Region. The site was declared a National Cultural Heritage by Resolución Directoral Nacional No. 682-INC-2004 on June 17, 2004.

The stone constructions of Yaynu are situated about 17 km south of Pomabamba at a height of more than 4,000 metres (13,123 ft), on the northern slope of Pañahirka (Pañajirca).

Yaynu is the largest known Recuay site and is best described as a fortified hilltop town. The area of the town is about 25 ha at its core. When counting associated defenses, corrals and terracing, the area is over 105 ha.

The central sector is bounded by perimeter walls and long trenches. The buildings are of stone and densely built up.

== History ==
Survey, mapping and sampling excavations show that its primary occupation dates to cal. AD 400–800, by groups of the Recuay tradition. At the centre of a network articulating small nearby farming villages, Yaynu features an impressive series of natural and built defensive strategies. These worked in concert to protect the community from outsiders and keep internal groups physically segregated.

The fortifications are discussed in relation to local political organization and a martial aesthetic in northern Peru during the period. Recuay elite identity and monumentalism arose out of local corporate traditions of hilltop dwelling and defence.
