= Huaconada =

Peruvian dance

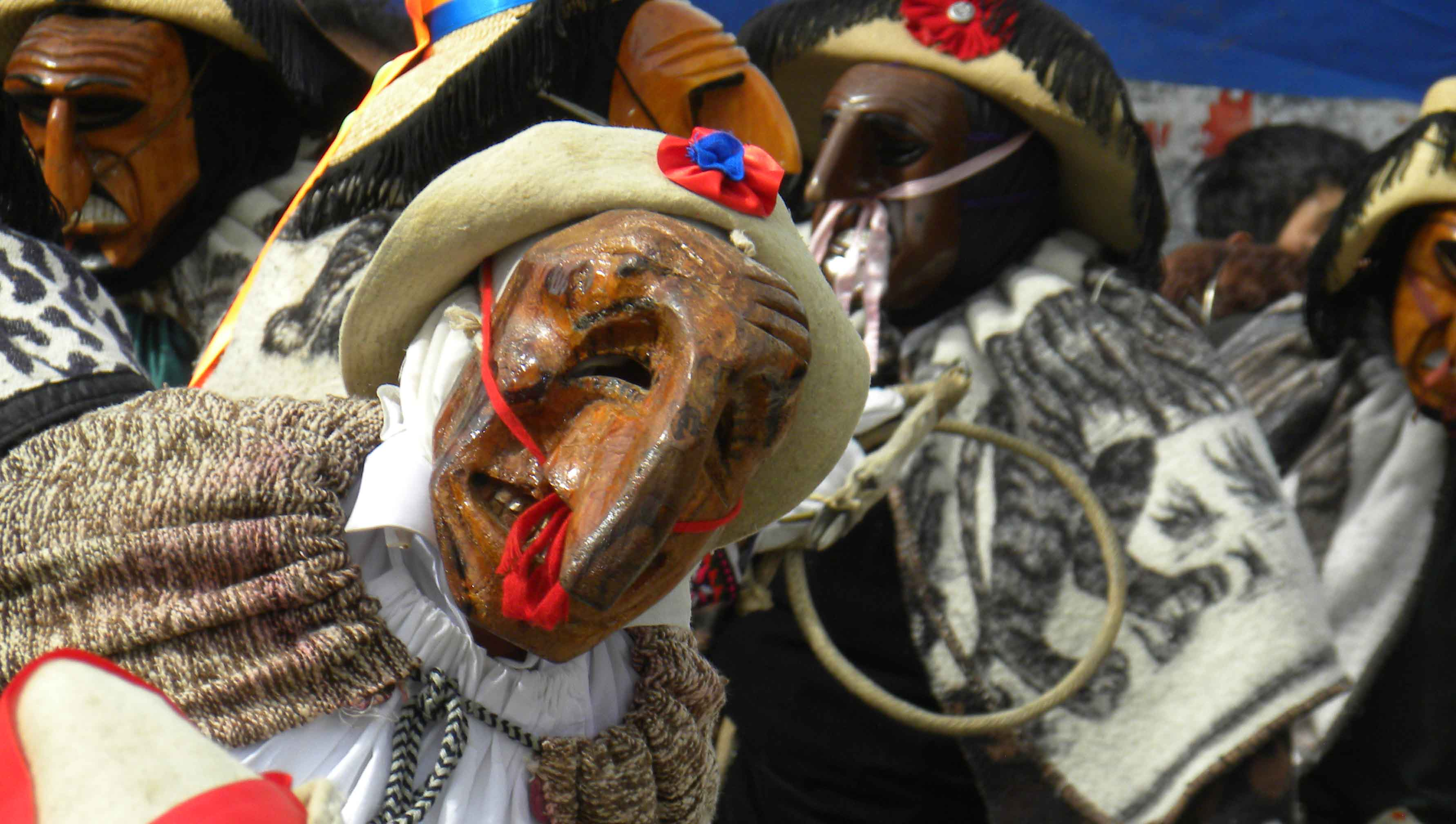
- The Huaconada ritual dance
- Genre: Ritual dance
- Origin: Mito (Concepción), Peru

Huaconada, ritual dance of Mito
- UNESCO Intangible Cultural Heritage
- Country: Peru
- Reference: 00390
- Region: Latin America and the Caribbean

Inscription history
- Inscription: 2010 (5th session)
- List: Representative

Huaconada (Spanish pronunciation: [wakoˈnaða]) is a ritual dance performed in the village of Mito in the province of Concepción in the central Peruvian Andes. It has been inscribed on the Representative List of the Intangible Cultural Heritage of Humanity by UNESCO in 2010.

On the first three days of every January, masked men known as "huacones" perform a choreographed series of dances in the center of the village. There are two types of "huacones": those that wear traditional costumes and finely carved masks "inspiring respect and fear," and those that wear modern costumes, "embodying terror, sadness, or mockery." A small indigenous drum called the "tinya" beats out time to which the dance is performed. The dance is passed from father to son with the accompanying clothing and masks, but only those of good conduct and moral integrity are allowed to perform the dance ritual as "huacones".

== See also ==
- Peruvian dances
