= Pomabamba =

Pomabamba Pumapampa
- Village
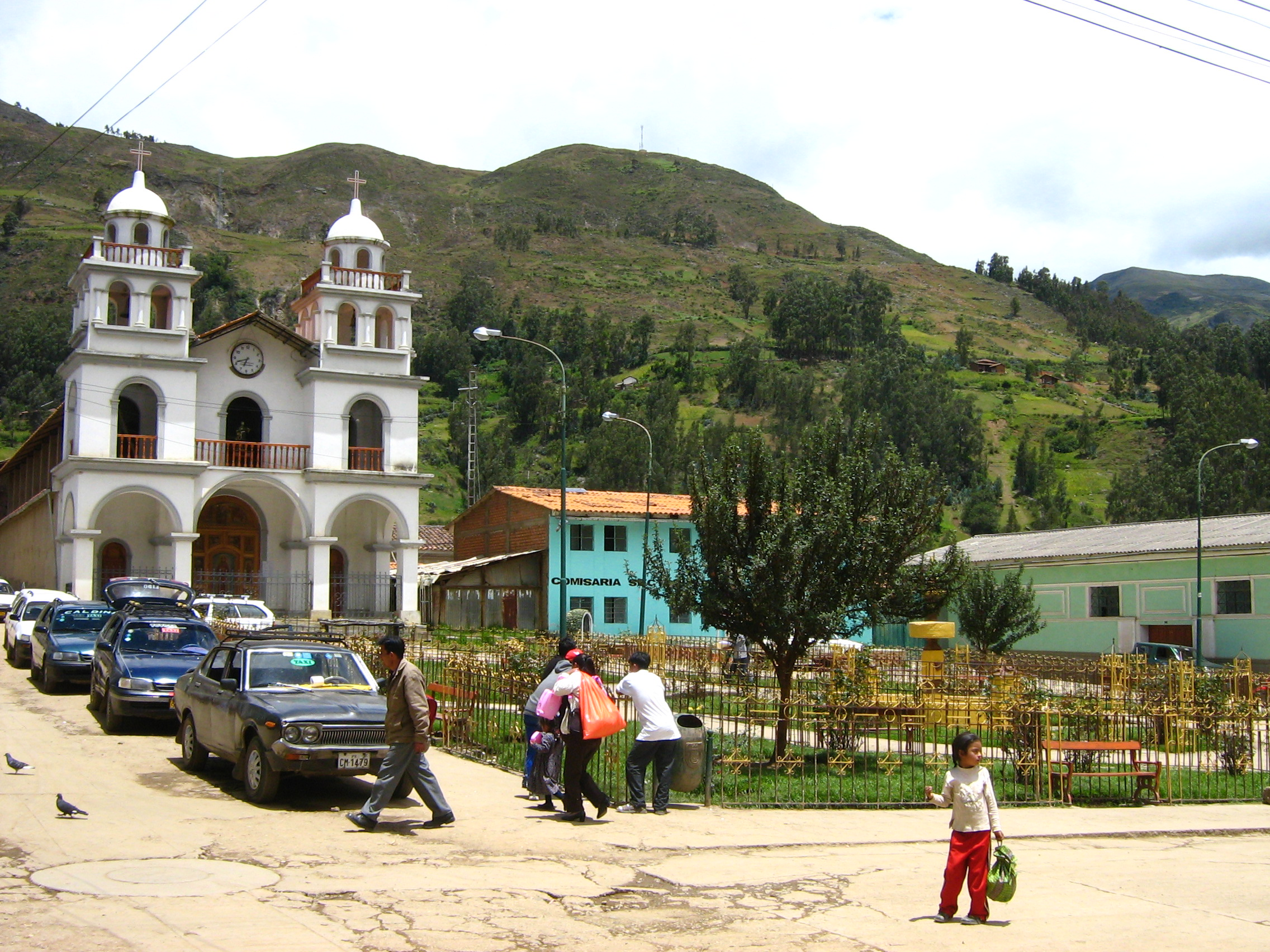
- Pomabamba
- Nickname: City of the Cedars
- Location within Peru
- Coordinates: 8°49′12″S 77°27′38″W
- Country: Peru
- Region: Ancash
- Province: Pomabamba
- District: Pomabamba
- Founded: 1574

Government
  - Mayor: Edgard Alcídes Vía Melgarejo
- Elevation: 2,950 m (9,680 ft)

Population
  - Total: 5,667
- Time zone: UTC-5 (PET)
- Website: munipomabamba.gob.pe

Pomabamba (Quechua Pumapampa, puma cougar, pampa large plain, "cougar plain") is a town in the Pomabamba District of the Pomabamba Province in the Ancash Region of Peru.

== Climate ==
Climate data for Pomabamba, elevation 2,985 m (9,793 ft), (1991–2020)
Month	Jan	Feb	Mar	Apr	May	Jun	Jul	Aug	Sep	Oct	Nov	Dec	Year
Mean daily maximum °C (°F)	21.6 (70.9)	21.3 (70.3)	20.9 (69.6)	21.2 (70.2)	21.9 (71.4)	21.9 (71.4)	22.1 (71.8)	22.5 (72.5)	22.5 (72.5)	22.3 (72.1)	22.7 (72.9)	21.7 (71.1)	21.9 (71.4)
Mean daily minimum °C (°F)	7.3 (45.1)	7.6 (45.7)	7.5 (45.5)	7.4 (45.3)	6.1 (43.0)	4.4 (39.9)	3.9 (39.0)	4.5 (40.1)	5.9 (42.6)	6.8 (44.2)	7.0 (44.6)	7.4 (45.3)	6.3 (43.4)
Average precipitation mm (inches)	140.9 (5.55)	133.2 (5.24)	148.2 (5.83)	102.7 (4.04)	40.0 (1.57)	12.0 (0.47)	6.8 (0.27)	10.5 (0.41)	36.6 (1.44)	99.7 (3.93)	91.6 (3.61)	145.2 (5.72)	967.4 (38.08)
Source: National Meteorology and Hydrology Service of Peru
