= Wari (dance) =

Music genre and type of dance

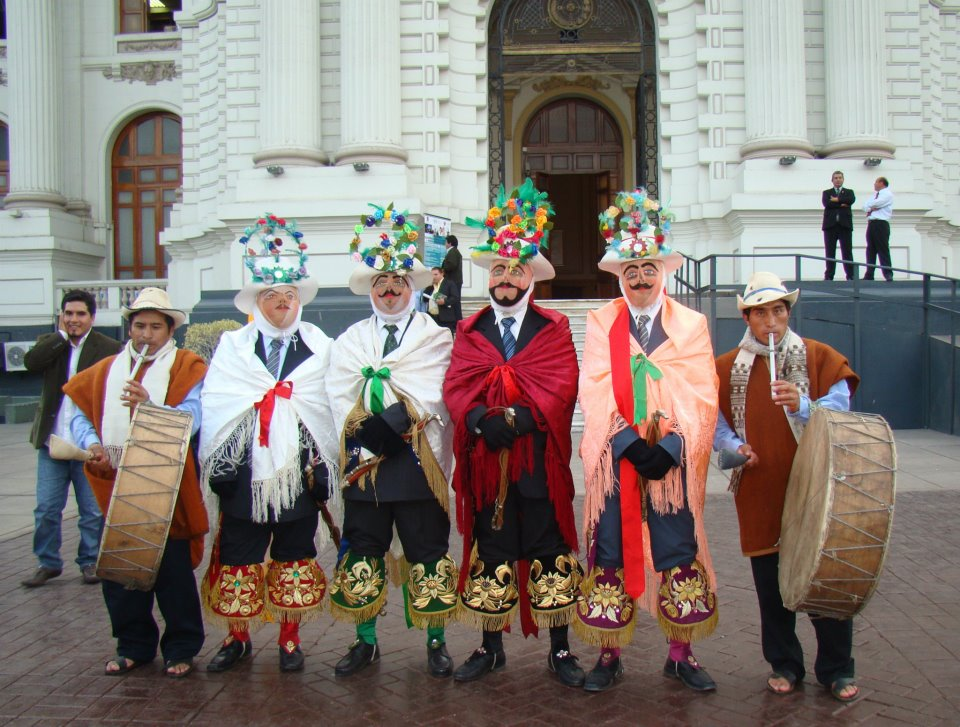
Dancers of the Wari dance and two musicians with their tinyas and pinkuyllus

Wari (hispanicized spelling Huari) is a traditional dance of the Ancash Region in Peru. The dancers are accompanied by musicians who play the tinya and the small pinkuyllu.

== See also ==
- Tinya palla
