= Danza de tijeras =

Dance from the Andes, Peru

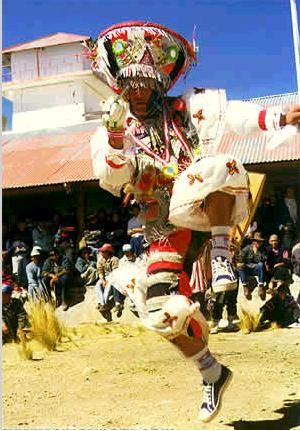
- Scissors dancer
- Genre: Folk dance
- Origin: Chanka people, Peru

Cultural Heritage of Peru
- Official name: Danza de las Tijeras
- Type: Intangible
- Criteria: Music and dances
- Designated: 22 March 2005; 21 years ago
- Legal basis: RDN 363/INC-2005

Siccors dance
- UNESCO Intangible Cultural Heritage
- Country: Peru
- Reference: 00391
- Region: Latin America and the Caribbean

Inscription history
- Inscription: 2010 (5th session)
- List: Representative

The Danza de las tijeras (Spanish pronunciation: [ˈdansa ðe las tiˈxeɾas]; English: scissors dance; Quechua: Supaypa wasin tusuq, also Galas, laijas) is an original dance of Chanka origin from the south of the Andes, in Peru. The dance consists of two or more dancers, followed by their respective orchestras of a violin and a harp. The dancers dance in turns, doing explicit moves and challenging steps, such as dancing with just one foot.

The places where this dance is most influential are: Huancavelica, Ayacucho, Junín, Apurimac, and Lima.

UNESCO designated the Danza de las tijeras intangible cultural heritage in 2010.

The scissors dance can be of different types, for example, the greater or competition dance, the smaller dance or "Qolla alva" which is danced at night; and zapateos, executed in the Christmas festivities. In the competition dance, two dancers (also called "danzaq" or "tusuq") dance by turns challenging each other to overcome the risk of the steps they perform, this competition is known as "Atipanakuy", "Hapinakuy", "Tupanakuy" among others.

== History ==
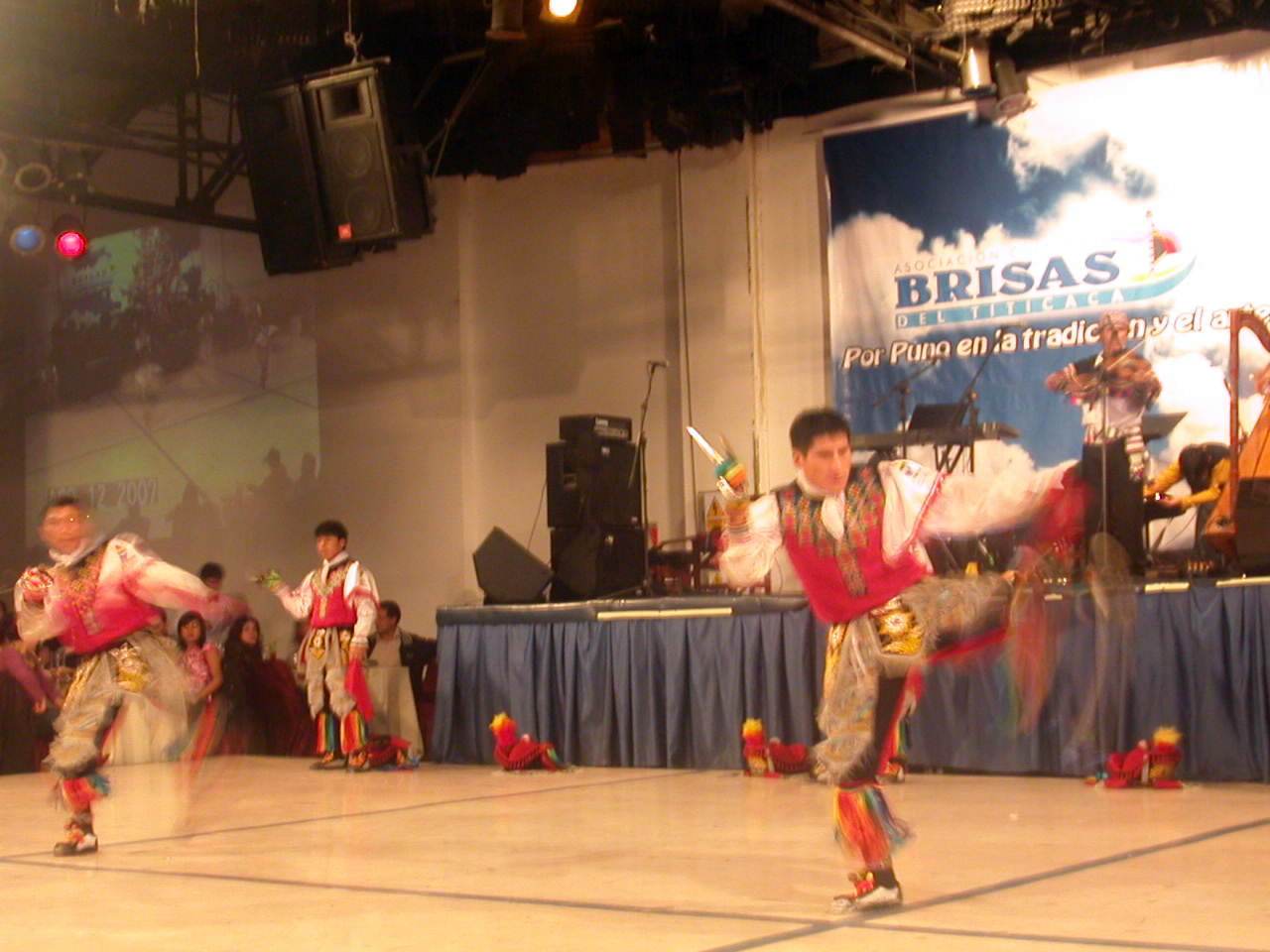
Danzante de tijeras (scissors dancer).

Danzantes de tijeras (scissors dancers) are descendants of the "tusuq laykas", prehispanic priests, fortune tellers, healers and shamans who experienced persecution during the colony. In this colonial period, they began to be known as "supaypa waman" (son of the devil in Quechua) and took refuge in the highest areas. As time passed by, the colonizers accepted they return but conditioning them to dance for the Catholic God and saints. In this way, they started to perform the danza de tijeras in fiestas patronales.

Nowadays, it is a magical-religious and ritual dance that represents, through their choreographies, the spirits of pachamama, yacumama, hanaccpacha, ucupacha, and others.

Peruvian writer José María Arguedas (1911-1969) immortalized danzante de tijeras in several novels, even in the short story La agonía de Rasu Ñiti (1962), the main character is one of them.

== Symbolism ==
The scissor dancers are identified with ritual skill and challenge from the outsider's point of view. Basically, the scissors dance is an impressive manifestation of physical art and skills, but to the Andean man it represents a complex ritual. A series of mysteries stalk around the dancers (the ones who do the ritual) who, in a surge of force and elasticity, test their skills with the gymnastics-like jump at the sound of a harp and a violin, while they cut the air with their scissors.

According to the priests of the colony, its magical side obeys to an assumption pact with the devil, due to surprising moves or tests that they execute in the dance. This tests denominate Atipanacuy.

The central instrument of the dance is the elaborated scissors of two independent metal plates of approximately 25 cm, and when the two plates are fused, they make a shape of blunt-end scissors. The scissors replaced the flat stones used in antiquity due to the similar sound they emit. It is considered a great humiliation if the scissors fall from the dancer's hand while he is dancing.

== See also ==
- Peruvian dances
- Taki Unquy
