= Puchkayuq Punta =

Mountain in Peru

- Location within Peru

Highest point
- Elevation: 4,800 m (15,700 ft)
- Coordinates: 9°05′59″S 77°39′18″W

Geography
- Location: Peru, Ancash Region
- Parent range: Andes, Cordillera Blanca

Puchkayuq Punta (Quechua puchka spindle, -n a suffix, punta peak; ridge, "the peak (or ridge) with a spindle", also spelled Puchcayoc Punta) is a mountain in the Cordillera Blanca in the Andes of Peru which reaches a height of approximately 4,800 m (15,748 ft). It is located in the Ancash Region, Yungay Province, Yungay District, northwest of Huascarán.
