= Yungay province =

Coordinates: 9°08′22″S 77°44′42″W

Yungay
- Province
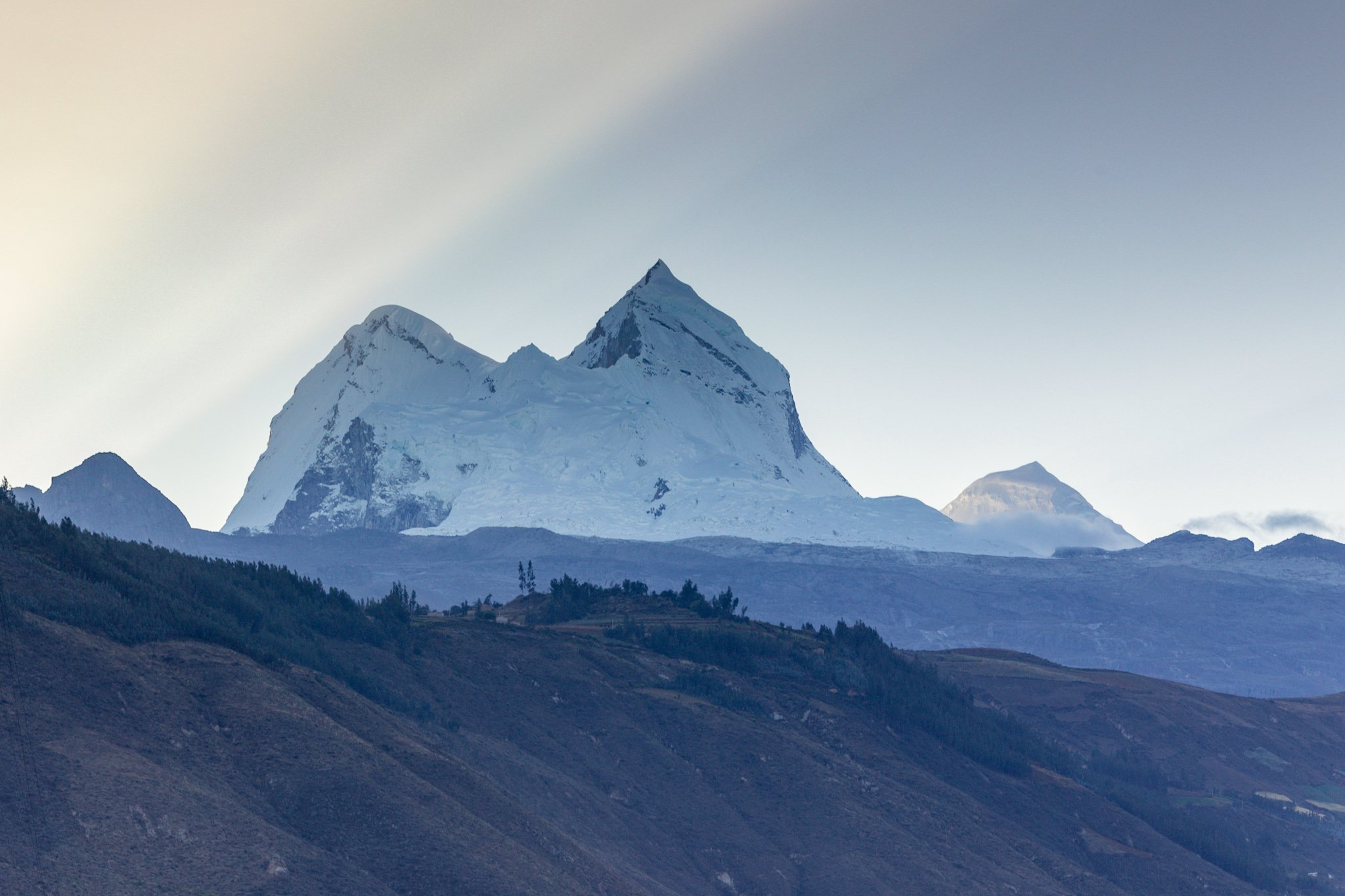
- The mountain Tullparahu as seen from Yungay

- Flag Coat of arms

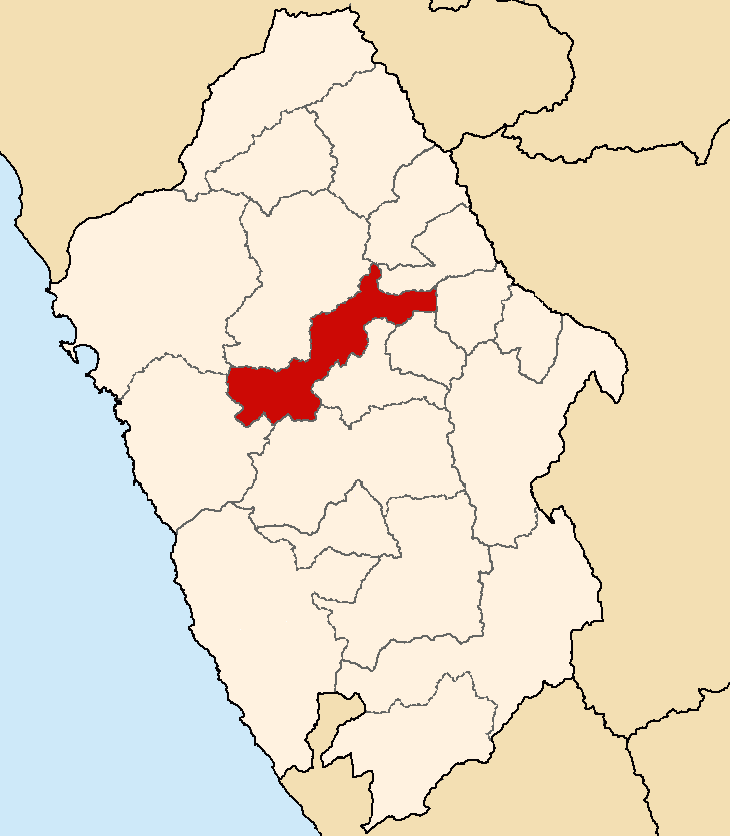
- Location of Yungay in the Ancash Region
- Country: Peru
- Region: Ancash
- Founded: October 28, 1904
- Capital: Yungay

Government
  - Mayor: Fernando Ciro Casio Consolación (2019-2022)

Area
  - Total: 1,361.48 km^{2} (525.67 sq mi)
- Elevation: 2,458 m (8,064 ft)

Population
  - Total: 50,841
  - Density: 37.342/km^{2} (96.717/sq mi)
- UBIGEO: 0220
- Website: www.yungayperu.com.pe

Yungay is one of twenty provinces of the Ancash Region in Peru.

== Geography ==
The Cordillera Blanca and the Cordillera Negra traverse the province. Waskaran, the highest elevation of Peru, lies on the border with the province of Carhuaz. Chakrarahu, Chopicalqui, Tullparahu and Yanarahu (Ruriqucha) belong to the highest peaks of the province. Other mountains are listed below:

- Ankas Pampa
- Chawllawi Punta
- Chunta
- Chunta Punta
- Churiq
- Hatun Kunka
- Hatun Qiqa
- Kima Tullpa
- Kinwa Hirka
- Kuntur Marka
- Kuntur Sinqa
- K'aya Punta
- Marka Hirka
- Misa Pata
- Paka Qutu
- Paqun
- Patuqucha
- Pirámide
- Pisqu
- Puchkayuq Punta
- Puka Hirka
- Puka Qutu
- Puka Waqra
- Puka Ranra
- Pukaqucha
- Pukarahu
- Puma Wayi
- Puma Willka
- Qaqa Rumi Kunka
- Qaqa Rumin
- Qucha Punta
- Qullqa Pampa
- Rukutu Punta
- Simuk'u Mach'ay
- Sintiru
- Tuqtupampa
- Uqa Punta
- Wallpaq Sillu Punta
- Waman Ch'uru
- Wamanripa
- Wamp'u
- Wamp'u Qutu
- Wamra
- Waqra P'unqu
- Warkhu Kunka
- Warkhu Pampa
- Waru Punta
- Waskaran
- Winchus
- Wiras
- Yana Qucha
- Yanaphaqcha
- Yanarahu
- Yura Qutu

== Political division ==
Yungay is divided into eight districts, which are:

- Cascapara
- Mancos
- Matacoto
- Quillo
- Ranrahirca
- Shupluy
- Yanama
- Yungay

== Ethnic groups ==
The people in the province are mainly indigenous citizens of Quechua descent. Quechua is the language which the majority of the population (73.19%) learnt to speak in childhood, 26.48% of the residents started speaking using the Spanish language (2007 Peru Census).

== See also ==
- Kiswar
- Llankanuku Lakes
- Qanchisqucha
