= Rocotopunta =

Mountain in Peru

- Location within Peru

Highest point
- Elevation: 5,400 m (17,700 ft)
- Coordinates: 9°02′17″S 77°41′07″W

Geography
- Location: Peru, Ancash Region
- Parent range: Andes, Cordillera Blanca

Rocotopunta (Quechua rukutu, ruqutu a plant (Capsicum pubescens), punta peak; ridge) is a mountain in the Cordillera Blanca in the Andes of Peru which reaches a height of approximately 5,400 m (17,717 ft). It is located in the Ancash Region, Huaylas Province, Caraz District, and in the Yungay Province, Yungay District. Rocotopunta lies west of Huandoy.
