= Matacoto District =

Coordinates: 9°10′42″S 77°44′57″W

Matacoto
- District
- Interactive map of Matacoto
- Country: Peru
- Region: Ancash
- Province: Yungay
- Founded: November 7, 1955
- Capital: Matacoto

Area
  - Total: 43.65 km^{2} (16.85 sq mi)
- Elevation: 2,500 m (8,200 ft)

Population (2017)
  - Total: 1,343
  - Density: 30.77/km^{2} (79.69/sq mi)
- Time zone: UTC-5 (PET)
- UBIGEO: 022004

Matacoto District is one of eight districts of the Yungay Province in Peru.

== Ethnic groups ==
The people in the district are mainly indigenous citizens of Quechua descent. Quechua is the language which the majority of the population (78.33%) learnt to speak in childhood, with 21.10% of the residents speaking Spanish language (2007 Peru Census).
