= Tinya palla =

Peruvian folk dance

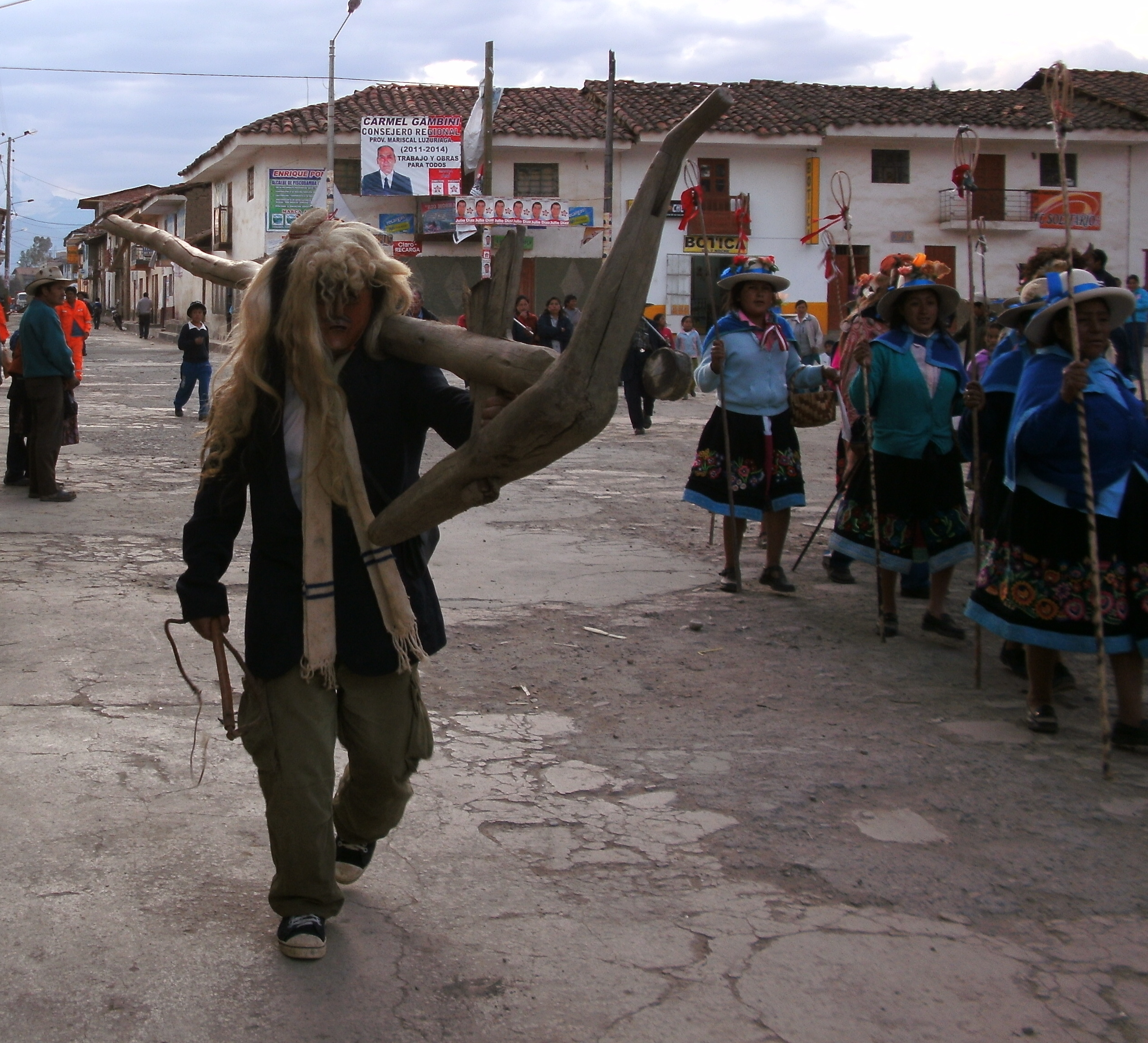
The awki accompanies the pallas.

Tinya palla (Quechua tinya a kind of drum, palla dame, lady, mature woman of the Inca nobility / a Peruvian folk dance with women representing Inca princesses) or wiqru palla (Quechua wiqru twisted, bent) is a traditional dance of the Pomabamba Province in the Ancash Region in Peru. In 2009 the National Institute of Culture declared tinya palla a National Cultural Heritage of Peru by Resolución Directoral Nacional No. 491/INC-2009.

== See also ==
- Wari dance
