= Facio Santillan =

Facio Santillan is an Argentinean flute player, specialising in the Quena. He rose to international fame in 1970 with his recording of the Andes folk anthem, El Condor Pasa, released initially as a single and later as a track on the Flutes of the Andes LP record series on the French label Riviera

The child of a large family, Santillan was born and raised in Santiago del Estero province in Argentina. He began playing the “quena” as a young boy, developing his skills both technically and also in phrasing, tone production and vibrato.

From 1960, he played with the ensemble Los Amigos de Amambay, travelling and performing throughout Argentina and Spanish America. In 1970 he was invited to Paris, France, to record a selection of Andes flute repertoire for Riviera, accompanied by a small ensemble usually consisting of guitar, bass and tambour. El Conder Pasa was released as a single and three albums followed under the French title Sortiléges De La Flûte Des Andes or Flutes of the Andes in English speaking countries. Billboard Magazine issue for 25 July 1970, reported 60,000 copies of the single sold in the first half of that year alone

Santillan was particularly popular in France, West Germany and Sweden during the 1970s. He appeared on the German TV variety shows Die Drehscheibe (1970 and 1971) and Drei mal neun (1971). In 1971 he was also a guest artist at the Internationale Funkausstellung Berlin, sharing the stage with Nancy Wilson, Ivan Rebroff, Ray Charles, Lulu and Henry Mancini.

In 2000, he was awarded by the Government of Santiago del Estero, the Biannual Music Prize "Ricardo Rojas" in recognition of his dedication to Culture.

He later settled in Hamburg, Germany, where he founded a recording studio and currently resides.

== Discography ==
- Flutes of the Andes (Riviera) 1970
- Flutes of the Andes Vol. 2 (Riviera) 1971
- Flutes of the Andes Vol. 3 (Riviera) 1972
- Facio Santillan (Intercord) 1977
