= Pucacocha (Ancash) =

Mountain in Peru

- Location within Peru

Highest point
- Elevation: 4,600 m (15,100 ft)
- Coordinates: 9°19′46″S 77°52′51″W

Geography
- Location: Peru, Ancash Region
- Parent range: Andes, Cordillera Negra

Pucacocha (Quechua puka red, qucha lake, "red lake") is a mountain at a little lake of that name in the Cordillera Negra in the Andes of Peru, about 4,600 m (15,100 ft) high. It is situated in the Ancash Region, Yungay Province, on the border of the districts of Cascapara and Quillo. Pucacocha lies between the Sechin River in the north and the Putaqa River in the south.

The lake named Pucacocha is at the foot of the mountain in the Cascapara District at 9°19′57″S 77°52′40″W.
