= Tuctubamba =

Mountain in Peru

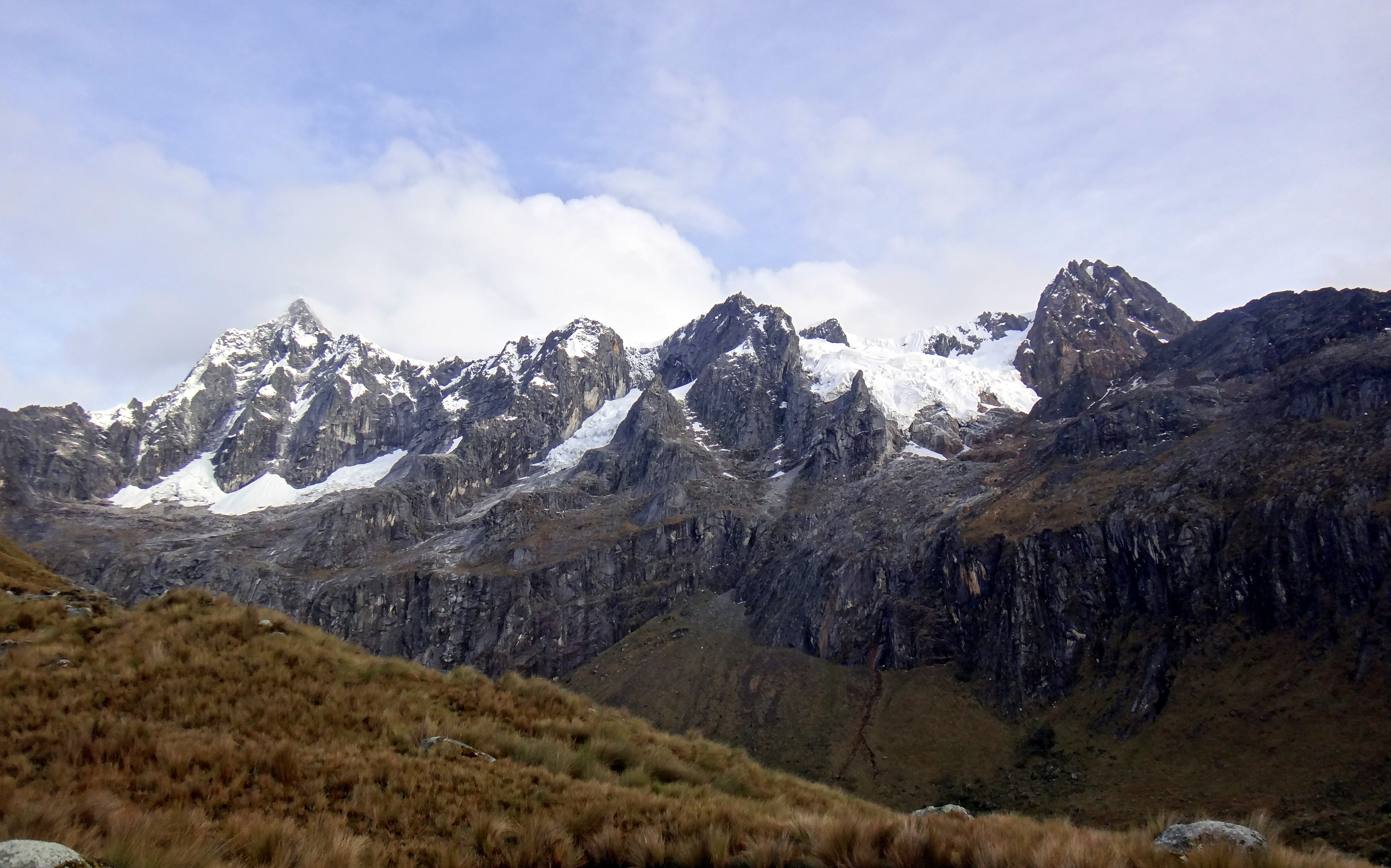
- Tuctubamba as seen from below Punta Unión

Highest point
- Elevation: 5,240 m (17,190 ft)
- Coordinates: 8°54′12″S 77°33′30″W

Geography
- Location within Peru
- Location: Peru, Ancash Region
- Parent range: Andes, Cordillera Blanca

Tuctubamba or Tuqtubamba (possibly from Quechua tuqtu broody hen, pampa a large plain, "broody hen plain") is a 5,240-metre-high (17,192 ft) mountain in the Cordillera Blanca in the Andes of Peru. It is situated in the Ancash Region, at the border of the Mariscal Luzuriaga Province, Lucma District, the Pomabamba Province, Huayllán District, and the Yungay Province, Yanama District. Tuctubamba lies southeast of Taulliraju.

== See also ==
- Sintiru
- Tawlliqucha
- Yuraqmayu
