= Mancos District =

Coordinates: 9°10′59″S 77°43′01″W

Mancos District Distrito de Mancos
- District
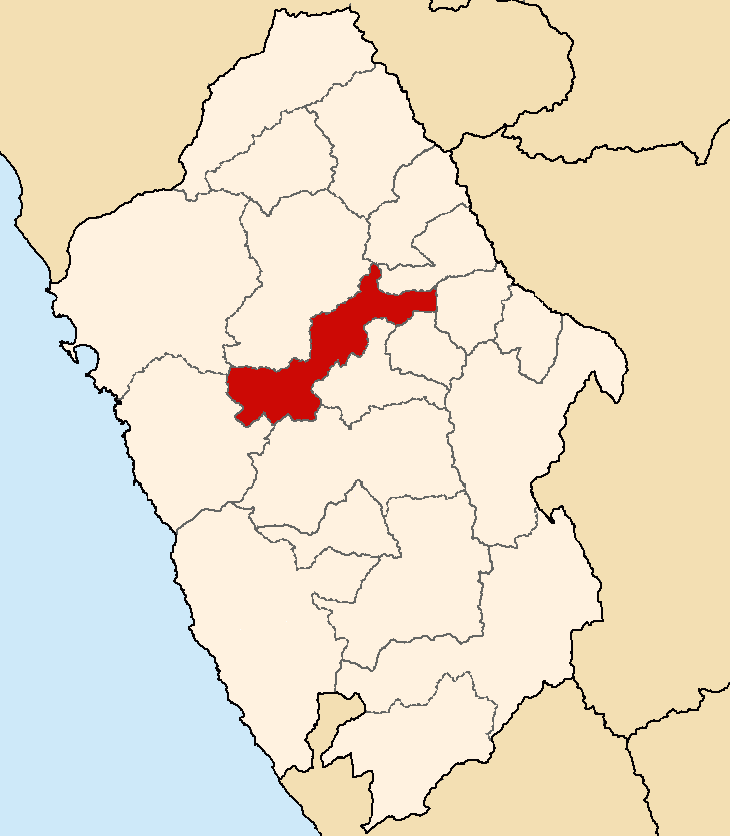
- Mancos District is in the Yungay province
- Interactive map of Mancos District
- Country: Peru
- Region: Ancash
- Province: Yungay
- Founded: 2 January 1857

Area
  - Total: 64.05 km^{2} (24.73 sq mi)
- Elevation: 2,507 m (8,225 ft)

Population (2017)
  - Total: 6,336
  - Density: 98.92/km^{2} (256.2/sq mi)
- Time zone: UTC-5 (PET)
- UBIGEO: 022003
- Website: www.munimancos.gob.pe

Mancos District is one of eight districts of the Yungay Province in Ancash Region, Peru. Mancos is called ``El corazón del Callejón de Huaylas´´ for being located in the centre of Callejón de Huaylas.

== History ==
To be the basis of popular elections, the National Convention of the 2 January 1857 created the District of Mancos as part of the Province of Santa. This creation was rendered ineffective by the same National Convention on 25 July 1857 to establish by law the province of Huaylas.

On 30 January 1871, the Congress of the Republic of Peru divided the District of Yungay to better service for the villages that make up dictating the Law of the creation of the District of Mancos, with rubric of the President José Balta and the congressman Manuel Santa María.

== Geographic location ==
Mancos, is the main district of the Province of Yungay. It is located in the central part of the Callejon de Huaylas, in the right margin of the Rio Santa, snow at the foot of the colossus that is Mount Huascaran dominant eastern side and whose melting born Mancos River crossing from east to west to flow into the Rio Santa. Their location is roughly as follows: 9 ° -36 "S latitude and 77 ° 43 '- 28" longitude west of Greenwich. Its altitude is 2.575 metres above sea level.

== Extension ==
The District Mancos area exceeds 50 square km. Bordered on the north, with Ranrahica district, separated by the stream of Putucauchachin and a road that lows from the village of Cochapampa, on the south by the province of Carhuaz, by means of an imaginary line which is a milestone in a place called Malpaso, on the east the village of Cochapampa and Tumpa belonging to the jurisdiction of Ranrahirca and Yungay respectively, and the stream of Ulta which separates it from Yanama, and on the west the districts of Shupluy and Cascapara on the left bank of the river Santa.

== Temperature ==
Due to its location and orography Mancos enjoys a delicious and excellent climate that provides healthy living to its inhabitants and start to the variety of its agricultural products. Varies according to their different heights between the valley and the mountains. But it is particularly characterised by having a mild and dry weather in the time when the river grows and becoming something relatively hot and a bit humid, in the rainy season, felt in the SE. The cold of the highlands, while in NO, the stifling heat of the proximity of the coast.

== Ethnic groups ==
The people in the district are mainly indigenous citizens of Quechua descent. Quechua is the language which the majority of the population (66.25%) learnt to speak in childhood, 33.57% of the residents started speaking using the Spanish language (2007 Peru Census).
