= Huayllán District =

Coordinates: 8°51′46″S 77°27′16″W

Huayllán Wayllan
- District
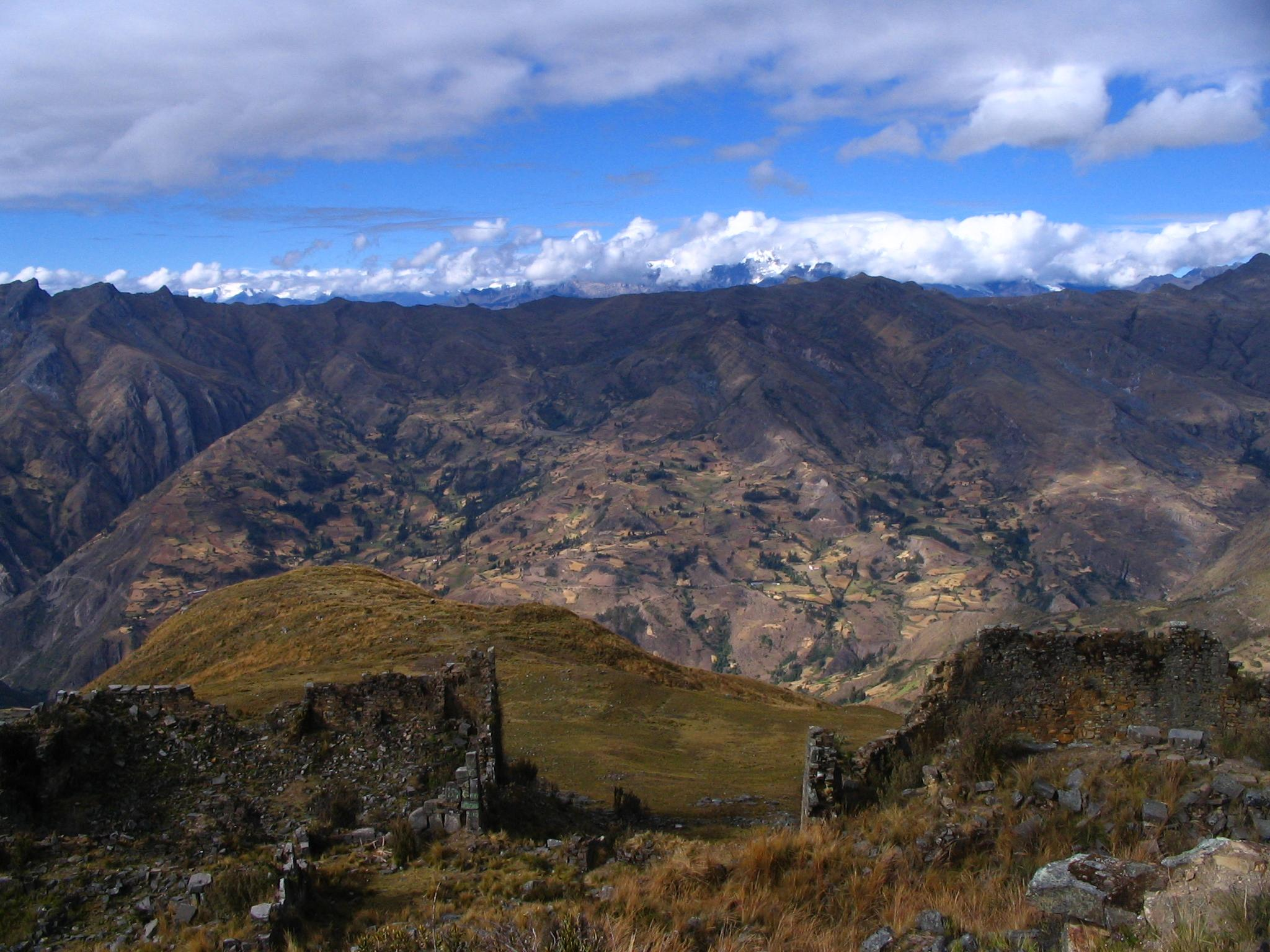
- The archaeological site of Yaynu, Huayllán District

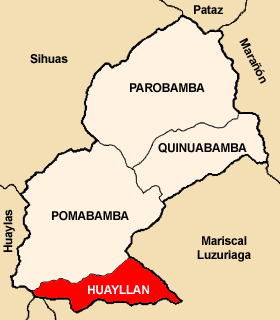
- Location of Huayllán in the Pomabamba province
- Country: Peru
- Region: Ancash
- Province: Pomabamba
- Founded: June 28, 1955
- Capital: Huayllán

Government
  - Mayor: Limas Velveder Miguel Angel

Area
  - Total: 88.97 km^{2} (34.35 sq mi)
- Elevation: 3,000 m (9,800 ft)
- Time zone: UTC-5 (PET)
- UBIGEO: 021602
- Website: munipomabamba.gob.pe

Huayllán District is one of four districts in the Pomabamba Province of the Ancash Region in Peru.

== Ethnic groups ==
The people in the district are mainly indigenous citizens of Quechua descent. Quechua is the language which the majority of the population (89.73%) learnt to speak in childhood, 9.95% of the residents started speaking using the Spanish language (2007 Peru Census).

== See also ==
- Ancash Quechua
- Tuqtupampa
- Yaynu
