= Quillo District =

Coordinates: 9°19′01″S 78°04′59″W

Quillo Q'illu
- District
- Interactive map of Quillo
- Country: Peru
- Region: Ancash
- Province: Yungay
- Founded: January 2, 1857
- Capital: Quillo

Area
  - Total: 373.83 km^{2} (144.34 sq mi)
- Elevation: 1,252 m (4,108 ft)

Population (2017)
  - Total: 11,629
  - Density: 31.108/km^{2} (80.569/sq mi)
- Time zone: UTC-5 (PET)
- UBIGEO: 022005

Quillo (from Quechua Q'illu, meaning "yellow") is one of eight districts of the Yungay Province in Peru.

== Geography ==
One of the highest peaks of the district is Paka Qutu at approximately 4,800 m (15,700 ft). Other mountains are listed below:

- Ch'ampa Hirka Punta
- Hatun Kunka
- Kuntur Sinqa
- Puka Ranra
- Pukaqucha
- Puma Wayi
- Puma Willka
- Punta
- Qaqa Pampa
- Qaqa Rumi Kunka
- Qaqa Rumin
- Wallpaq Sillu Punta
- Wamanripa
- Wamp'u
- Wamp'u Qutu
- Wamra
- Waqra P'unqu
- Warkhu Punta
- Waru Punta
- Waskaran
- Wiñaq
- Wiras

== Ethnic groups ==
The people in the district are mainly indigenous citizens of Quechua descent. Quechua is the language which the majority of the population (96.11%) learnt to speak in childhood, 3.74% of the residents started speaking using the Spanish language (2007 Peru Census).

== See also ==
- Qanchisqucha
