= Parobamba District =

Coordinates: 8°42′00″S 77°22′59″W

Parobamba Parupampa
- District
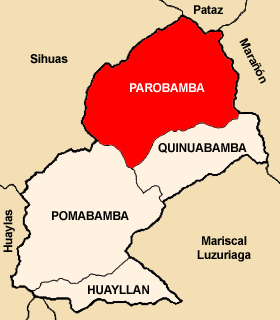
- Location of Parobamba in the Pomabamba province
- Country: Peru
- Region: Ancash
- Province: Pomabamba
- Founded: August 28, 1868
- Capital: Parobamba

Government
  - Mayor: Rolando Sanchez Vidal (2007)

Area
  - Total: 331.1 km^{2} (127.8 sq mi)
- Elevation: 3,185 m (10,449 ft)
- Time zone: UTC-5 (PET)
- UBIGEO: 021603
- Website: munipomabamba.gob.pe

Parobamba District is one of 4 districts in the Pomabamba Province of the Ancash Region in Peru.

== Ethnic groups ==
The people in the district are mainly indigenous citizens of Quechua descent. Quechua is the language which the majority of the population (96.80%) learnt to speak in childhood, 2.91% of the residents started speaking using the Spanish language (2007 Peru Census).

== See also ==
- Ancash Quechua
