= Canchiscocha (Yungay) =

Lake in the Yungay Province in Peru

- Location within Peru
- Location: Peru; Ancash Region
- Coordinates: 9°15′05″S 77°49′12″W

Canchiscocha (possibly from Quechua qanchis seven qucha lake, "seven lakes") is a lake in the Cordillera Negra in the Andes of Peru located in the Ancash Region, Yungay Province, Quillo District. It lies northeast of Puka Ranra.
