= Quena =

Traditional musical instrument

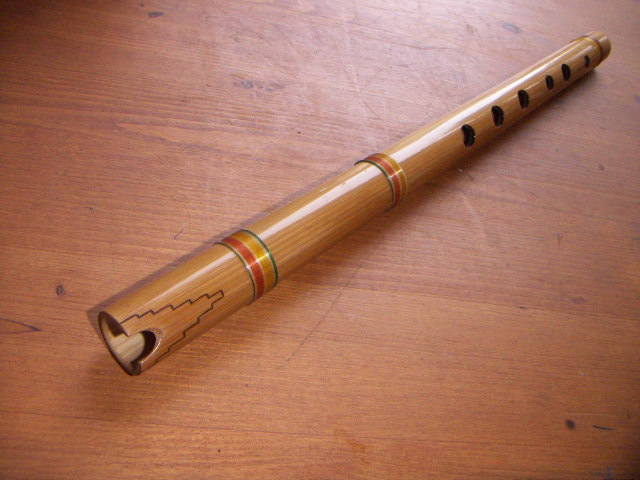
- The quena is a South American wind instrument, mostly used by Andean musicians

Woodwind instrument
- Other names: Quena; Qina
- Classification: Edge-blown aerophone
- Hornbostel–Sachs classification: 421.111.12 (end-blown flute with notched rim)

Playing range
- The typical range of the quena is G_{4} to A_{6}, depending on the instrument and performer.

Related instruments
- Siku; Quenacho; Flute; Recorder

Cultural Heritage of Peru
- Official name: Quena
- Type: Intangible
- Criteria: Music and dances
- Designated: 22 August 2008; 18 years ago
- Legal basis: R.D.N. 1103/INC-2008

The quena (hispanicized spelling of Quechua qina, sometimes also written kena in English) is the traditional flute of the Andes. Traditionally made of cane or wood, it has 6 finger holes and one thumb hole, and is open on both ends or the bottom is half-closed (choked). To produce sound, the player closes the top end of the pipe with the flesh between the chin and lower lip, and blows a stream of air downward, along the axis of the pipe, over an elliptical notch cut into the end. It is normally in the key of G, with G4 being the lowest note. It produces a very "textured" and "dark" timbre because of the length-to-bore ratio of about 16 to 20 (subsequently causing difficulty in the upper register), which is very unlike the tone of the Western concert flute with a length-to-bore ratio of about 38 to 20.

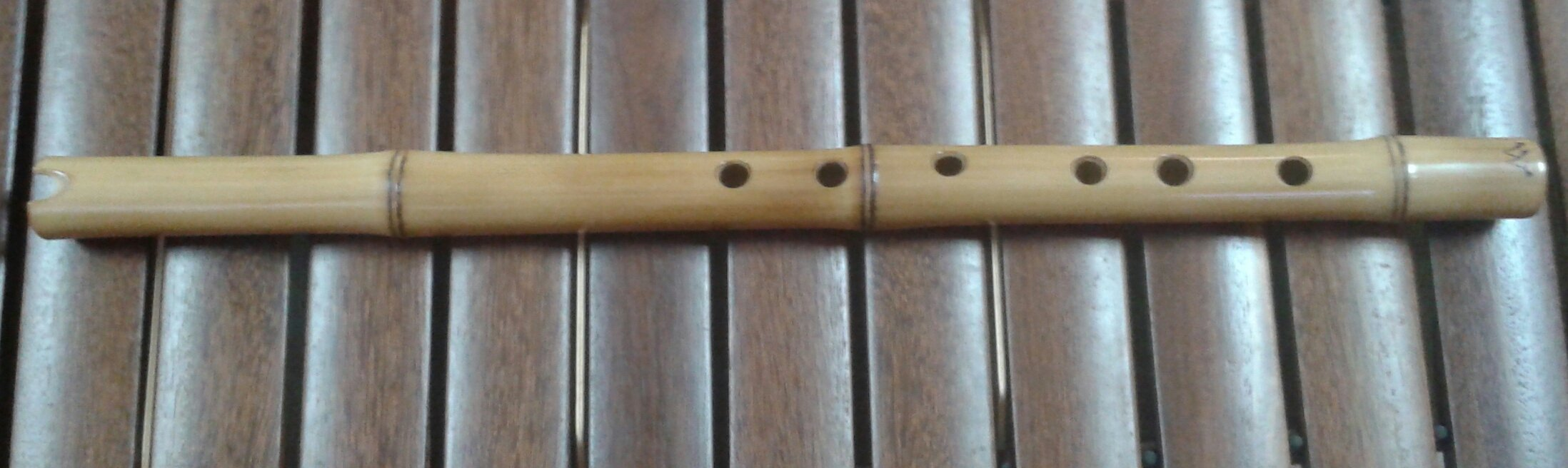
Quenacho made in Argentina

The quenacho (also "kenacho" in English) is a larger, lower-toned version of the quena and made the same way. It is in the key of D, with D4 being the lowest note, a perfect fourth lower than the quena. It produces a very rich timbre because of the length-to-bore ratio of about 25, paradoxically brighter by comparison to the quena.

The quena is mostly used in traditional Andean music. In the 1960s and 1970s the quena was used by several nueva canción musicians. This use was in most cases for particular songs and not as a standard instrument, but some groups such as Illapu and virtuoso player Facio Santillan have used it regularly. In the 1980s and 1990s some post-nueva canción rock groups have also incorporated the quena in some of their songs; notably Soda Stereo in Cuando Pase el Temblor and Los Enanitos Verdes in Lamento Boliviano. The quena is also relatively common in world music.

== Other Andean instruments similar to the quena ==
Other Andean flutes include the following:

- The pinkillu has the same fingering as the quena, and is similar in appearance and operation to a recorder. Unlike the actual quena, it has an air channel or fipple to conduct the air;
- The tarka (or tharqa), which also operates like a recorder but is comparatively shorter and quite angular in shape, requires greater breath, and has a darker, more penetrating sound;
- The moseño (originally mohoseño), is a long, dual-tube bamboo flute with a deep sound. The auxiliary tube acts as an aeroduct.

== See also ==
- Native American flute
- Shakuhachi, a similar Japanese end-blown flute
- Xiao (flute), a similar Chinese end-blown flute
