= Danzantes de Levanto =

Type of dance

Los Danzantes de Levanto is a typical dance from the Amazonas Region, Peru. Levanto is a little town that is approximately 10 km (6.2 mi) from Chachapoyas, whose "dancers" form a showy group of thirteen cholos, very well trained, that are guided by a "pifador" (a person who whistles) that plays the antara and a small drum called tinya simultaneously.

They wear a white shirt of wide and long sleeves, a black vest adorned with red ribbons and black trousers. They also wear a crown of showy peacock's feathers. Their presence is important in all the big celebrations of the region.

Other well-known dances that are performed in diverse localities are:

- the "Conchiperla", in which the man gives a handkerchief to his partner keeping a knee in the ground and if he doesn't do it, a glass of liqueur must be drunk in punishment,
- the "Trapichillo", danced by four couples grabbed by the right hands and turning around from right to left side,
- the "Quinsamana", in which insults and compliments are mixed.
