= Hatun Kunka (Huaylas-Yungay) =

Mountain in Peru

- Location within Peru

Highest point
- Elevation: 4,400 m (14,400 ft)
- Coordinates: 9°14′47″S 77°56′15″W

Geography
- Location: Peru, Ancash Region
- Parent range: Andes, Cordillera Negra

Hatun Kunka (Quechua hatun big, kunka throat, gullet, "big throat (or gullet)", also spelled Jatuncunca) is a mountain in the Cordillera Negra in the Andes of Peru which reaches a height of approximately 4,400 m (14,436 ft). It is located in the Ancash Region, Huaylas Province, Pamparomas District, and in the Yungay Province, Quillo District.
