= Kima Tullpa =

Mountain in Peru

- Location within Peru

Highest point
- Elevation: 4,600 m (15,100 ft)
- Coordinates: 9°21′51″S 77°45′48″W

Geography
- Location: Peru, Ancash Region
- Parent range: Andes, Cordillera Negra

Kima Tullpa (Ancash Quechua kima three (kimsa), Quechua tullpa cook stove, "three cook stoves", also spelled Quimatullpa) is a mountain in the Cordillera Negra in the Andes of Peru which reaches a height of approximately 4,600 m (15,100 ft). It is located in the Ancash Region, Yungay Province, Shupluy District.
