= Quishuar (archaeological site) =

Archaeological site in Peru

Kiswar
- Location: Peru, Ancash Region, Yungay Province

Quishuar (Quechua for Buddleja incana) is an archaeological site in Peru. It is situated in the Ancash Region, Yungay Province, in the south of the Yanama District.
