= Huampo (Huaylas-Yungay) =

Mountain in Peru

- Location within Peru

Highest point
- Elevation: 4,000 m (13,000 ft)
- Coordinates: 9°14′35″S 77°59′56″W

Geography
- Location: Peru, Ancash Region
- Parent range: Andes, Cordillera Negra

Huampo or Wamp'u (Quechua for boat, also spelled Huanpu) is a mountain in the Cordillera Negra in the Andes of Peru which reaches a height of approximately 4,000 m (13,000 ft). It is located in the Ancash Region, Huaylas Province, Pamparomas District, and in the Yungay Province, Quillo District.
