= Yanama District =

Yanama Yanama
- District
- Nickname: Yanama
- Interactive map of Yanama
- Coordinates: 9°01′59″S 77°28′59″W
- Country: Peru
- Region: Ancash
- Province: Yungay
- Founded: August 2, 1920
- Capital: Yanama

Area
  - Total: 279.85 km^{2} (108.05 sq mi)
- Elevation: 3,375 m (11,073 ft)

Population (2005 census)
  - Total: 7,105
  - Density: 25.39/km^{2} (65.76/sq mi)
- Time zone: UTC-5 (PET)
- UBIGEO: 022008

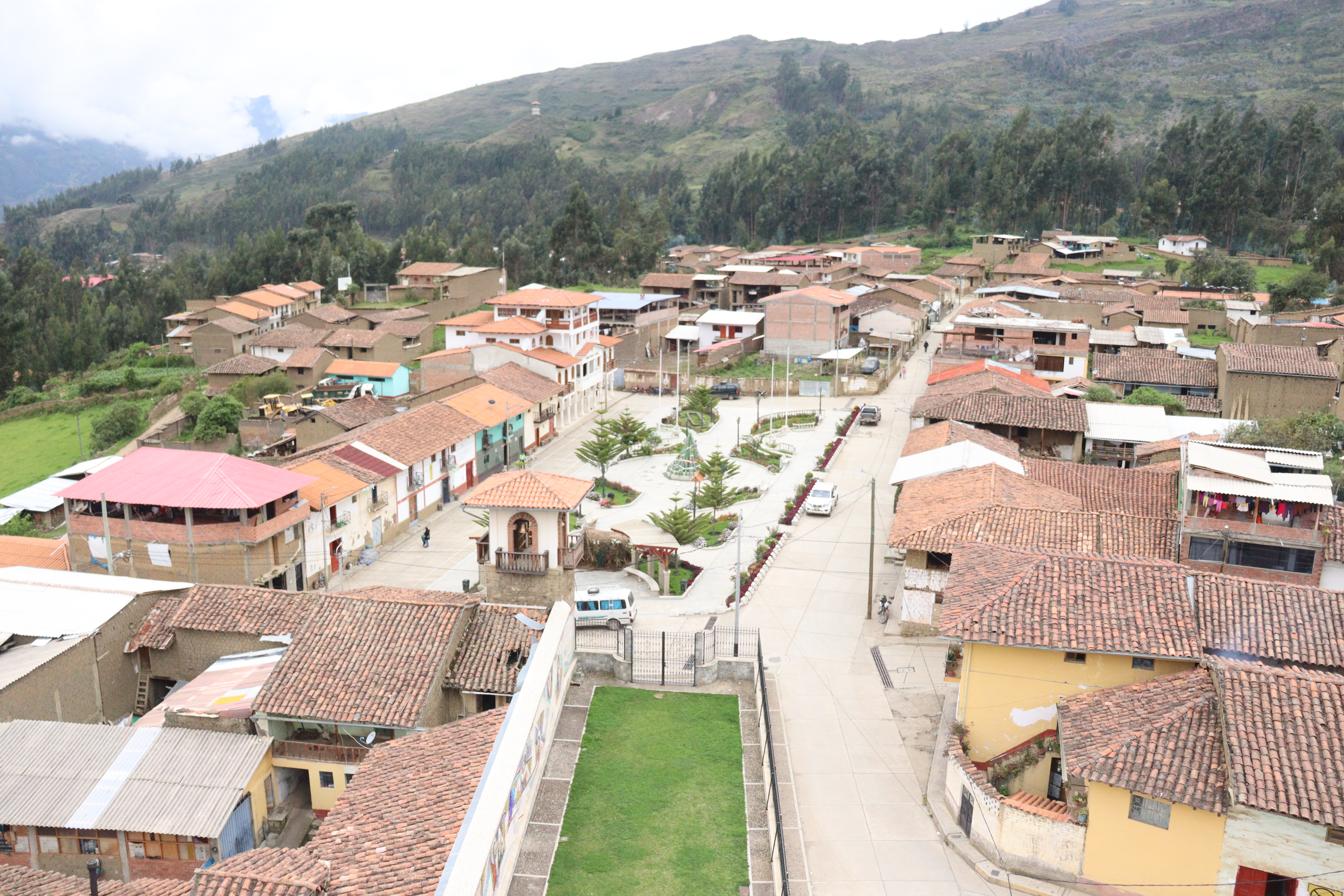
Plaza de armas de Yanama

Yanama District is one of eight districts of the Yungay Province in Peru.

== Ethnic groups ==
The people in the district are mainly indigenous citizens of Quechua descent. The majority (87.35%) learnt to speak the Quechua language in childhood, with 11.36% speaking Spanish (2007 Peru Census).

== See also ==
- Kiswar
- Pirámide
- Pukarahu
- Tuqtupampa
- Yanaphaqcha
- Yanarahu (Ruriqucha)
- Yanarahu (Yanama-Yungay)
