= Quinuabamba District =

Coordinates: 8°43′59″S 77°22′01″W

Quinuabamba Kinwapampa
- District
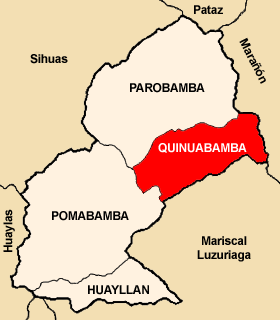
- Location of Quinuabamba in the Pomabamba province
- Country: Peru
- Region: Ancash
- Province: Pomabamba
- Founded: September 26, 1941
- Capital: Quinuabamba

Government
  - Mayor: Pepe Juan Moreno Dominguez (2007)

Area
  - Total: 146.06 km^{2} (56.39 sq mi)
- Elevation: 3,108 m (10,197 ft)
- Time zone: UTC-5 (PET)
- UBIGEO: 021604
- Website: munipomabamba.gob.pe

Quinuabamba District is one of 4 districts in the Pomabamba Province of the Ancash Region in Peru.

== Ethnic groups ==
The people in the district are mainly indigenous citizens of Quechua descent. Quechua is the first language for the majority (96.60%) of the population with Spanish as the next highest (2.91%) (2007 Peru Census).

== See also ==
- Ancash Quechua
