= Wallpaq Sillu Punta =

Mountain in Peru

- Location within Peru

Highest point
- Elevation: 4,600 m (15,100 ft)
- Coordinates: 9°17′32″S 77°49′11″W

Geography
- Location: Peru, Ancash Region
- Parent range: Andes, Cordillera Negra

Wallpaq Sillu Punta (Quechua wallpa hen, -q an obsolete suffix, sillu claw, punta peak; ridge, "chicken claw peak (or ridge)", also spelled Huallpacsillopunta) is a mountain in the Cordillera Negra in the Andes of Peru which reaches a height of approximately 4,600 m (15,100 ft). It is located in the Ancash Region, Yungay Province, on the border of the districts of Cascapara and Quillo.
