= Yanapaccha =

Mountain in Peru

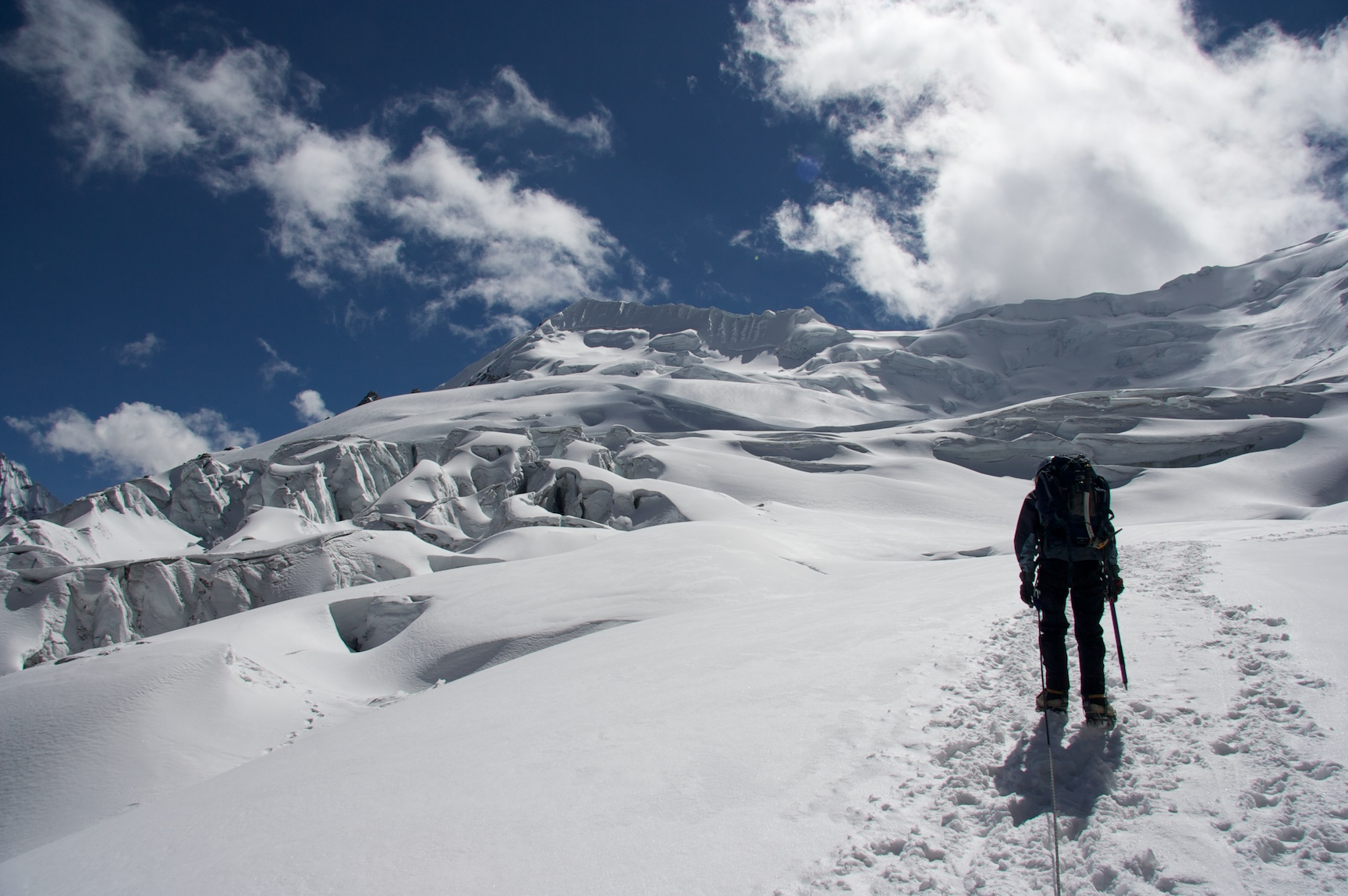

Highest point
- Elevation: 5,460 m (17,910 ft)
- Coordinates: 9°01′35″S 77°34′37″W

Naming
- English translation: black waterfall
- Language of name: Quechua

Geography
- Location within Peru
- Location: Peru, Ancash Region
- Parent range: Andes, Cordillera Blanca

Yanapaccha (possibly from Quechua yana black, phaqcha waterfall, "black waterfall") is a mountain in the Cordillera Blanca in the Andes of Peru, about 5,460 metres (17,913 ft) high. It is situated in the Ancash Region, Yungay Province, in the districts Yanama and Yungay. Yanapaccha lies in the Huascarán National Park, southeast of Chacraraju.
