= Llanganuco Lakes =

Lakes in Peru

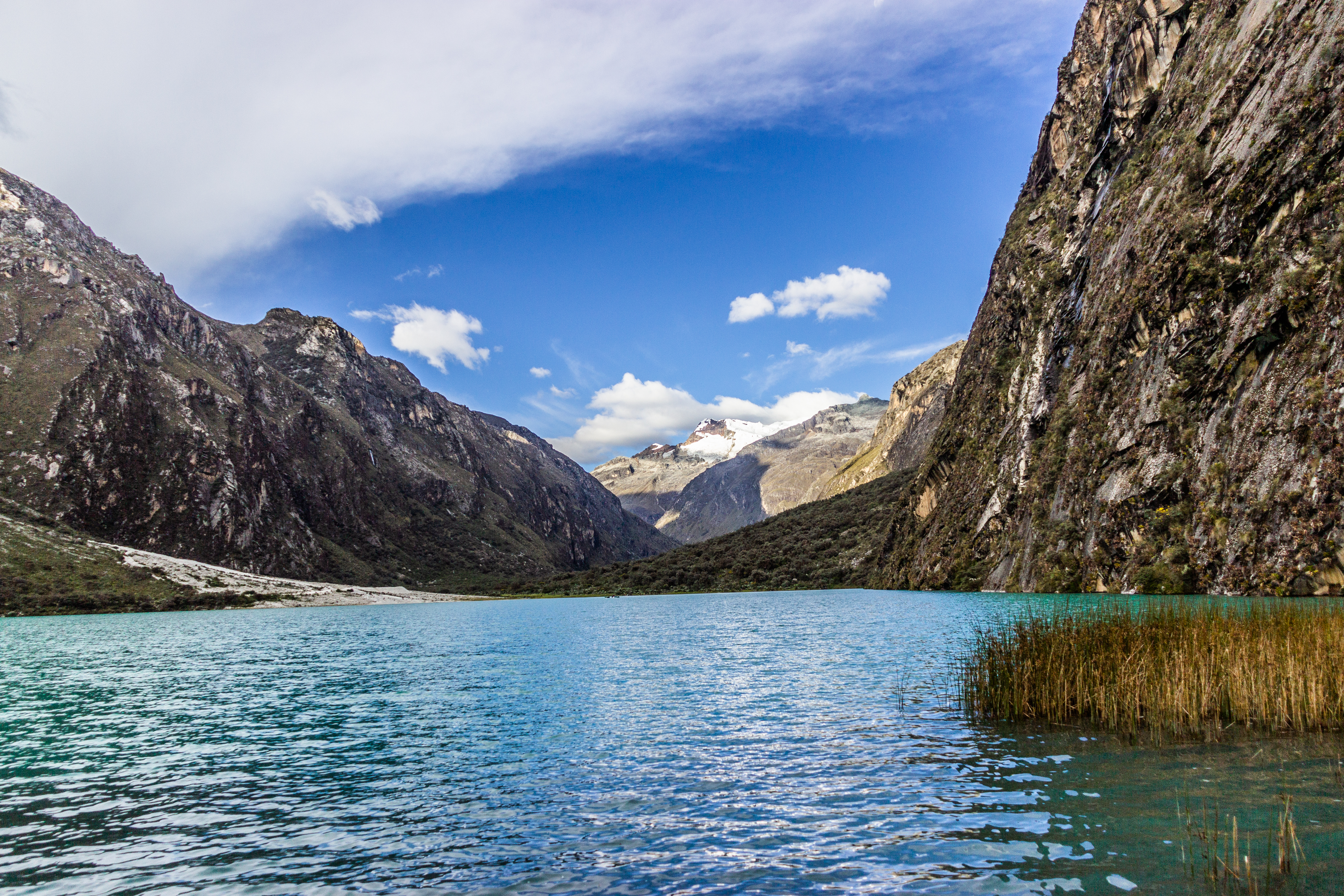
- Heaven's Gate in Laguna de Chinancocha

- Location within Peru Location within South America
- Interactive map of Llanganuco Lakes
- Location: Peru; Ancash Region
- Coordinates: 9°04′03″S 77°38′17″W
- Surface elevation: 3,850 m (12,630 ft)

The Llanganuco Lakes (Llankanuku in Quechua language), Chinancocha and Orconcocha, are situated in the Cordillera Blanca in the Andes of Peru. They are located in Ancash Region, Yungay Province, Yungay District, about 25 km north-east of Yungay. The lakes are part of Huascarán National Park.

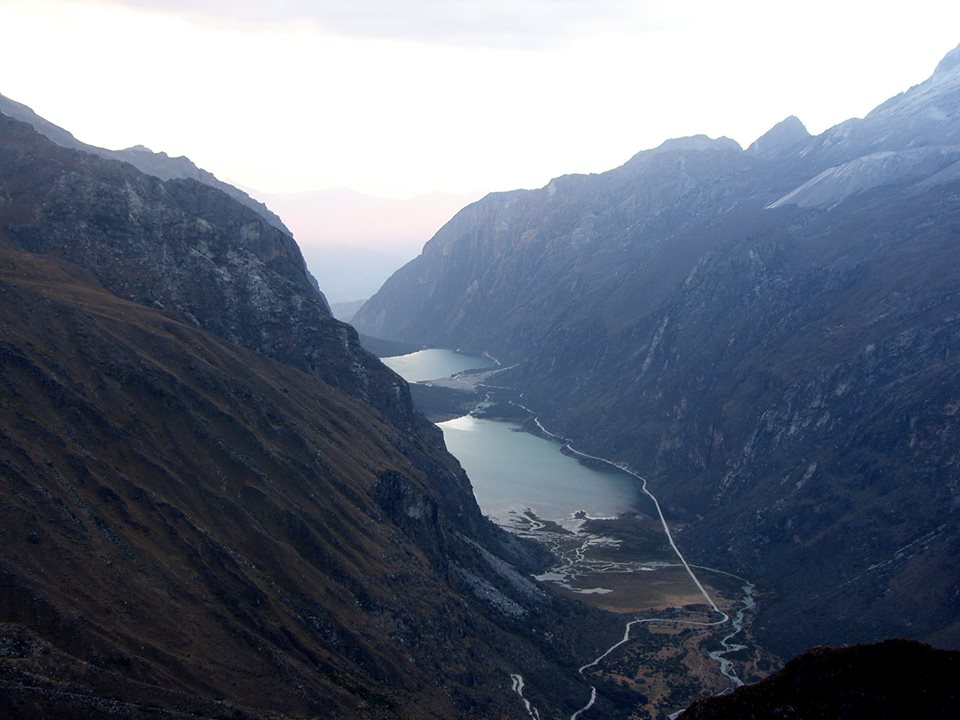
The Llanganuco lakes as seen from a mountaintop east of the lakes. The lake further west is Chinancocha.

== Chinancocha ==
Water flowing from Lake Chinancocha.

Lake Chinancocha, (possibly from Quechua china female, -n a suffix, qucha lake, "female lake") lies at an altitude of 3,850 metres (12,631 ft). It is situated southwest of Lake Orconcocha.

== Orconcocha ==
Lake Orconcocha (possibly from Quechua urqu male / mountain, "male lake") lies about 1 km away from Chinancocha at the end of the Llanganuco valley.

== 1970 Earthquake ==
An extensive earthquake in 1970 caused an avalanche which created a third smaller lake between the two main lakes.
