= Tarka (flute) =

Type of wooden flute of the indigenous Andes

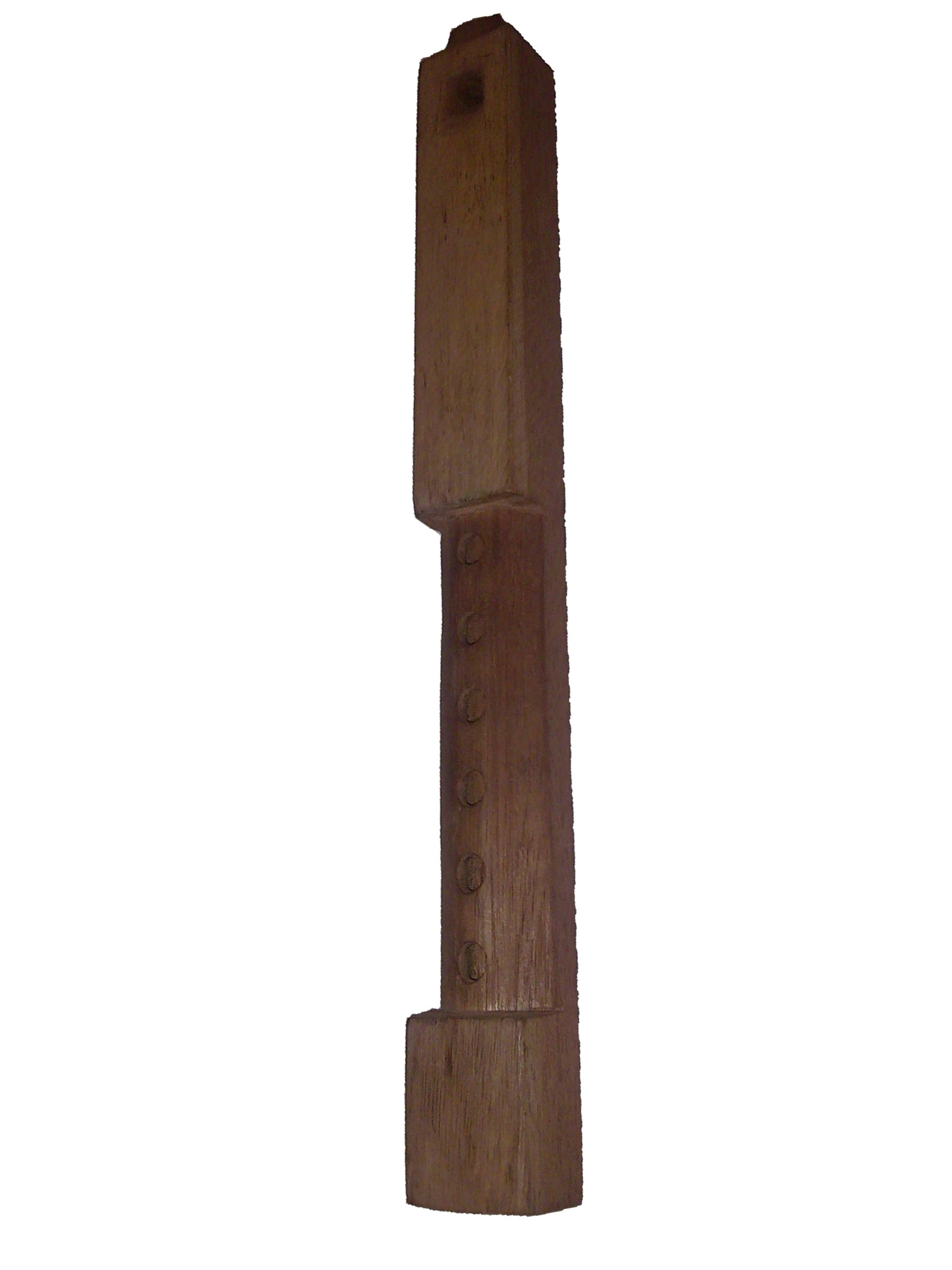
Tarka (flute).

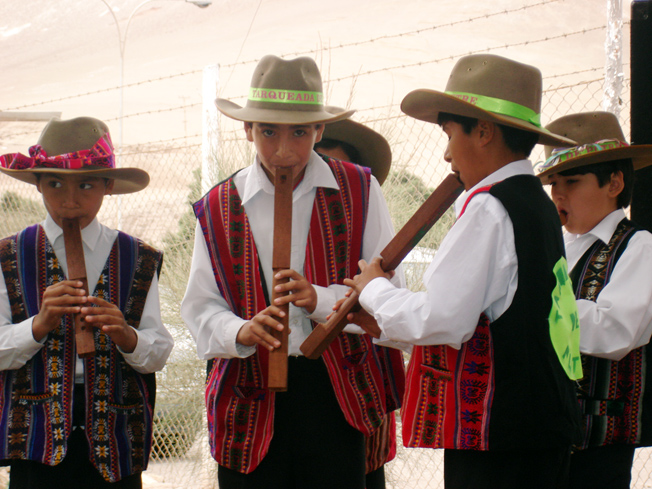
Kids playing the tarka.

The tarka (Quechua, Aymara: tharqa) is an indigenous flute of the Andes. Usually made of wood, it has 6 finger holes, fipple on mouth end and a free hole on distant end.

The tarka is a blockflute, like a recorder, but is comparatively shorter and quite angular in shape, requires greater breath, and has a darker, more penetrating sound.

The tarka has three variants: big, medium (tuned by fifth above) and small (tuned by octave above). Usually all three kinds of tarka are used together in a big ensemble, all playing the same melody on three voices at fixed intervals and accompanied by percussion instruments (tinya, wankar). This traditional genre is called tarqueada.

== See also ==
- Quena
