= Cascapara District =

Coordinates: 9°13′01″S 77°43′01″W

Cascapara
- District
- Coat of arms
- Interactive map of Cascapara
- Country: Peru
- Region: Ancash
- Province: Yungay
- Founded: November 29, 1915
- Capital: Cascapara

Government
  - Mayor: Pablo Cesar Berillo Figueroa (2019–2022)

Area
  - Total: 138.32 km^{2} (53.41 sq mi)
- Elevation: 2,725 m (8,940 ft)

Population (2017)
  - Total: 1,674
  - Density: 12.10/km^{2} (31.34/sq mi)
- Time zone: UTC-5 (PET)
- UBIGEO: 022002
- Website: municascapara.gob.pe

Cascapara District is one of eight districts of the Yungay Province in Peru.

== Ethnic groups ==
The people in the district are mainly indigenous citizens of Quechua descent. Quechua is the language which the majority of the population (87.31%) learnt to speak in childhood, 12.59% of the residents started speaking using the Spanish language (2007 Peru Census).

== See also ==
- Pukaqucha
- Wallpaq Sillu Punta
