= Pomabamba District =

Coordinates: 8°49′59″S 77°28′01″W

Pomabamba
- District
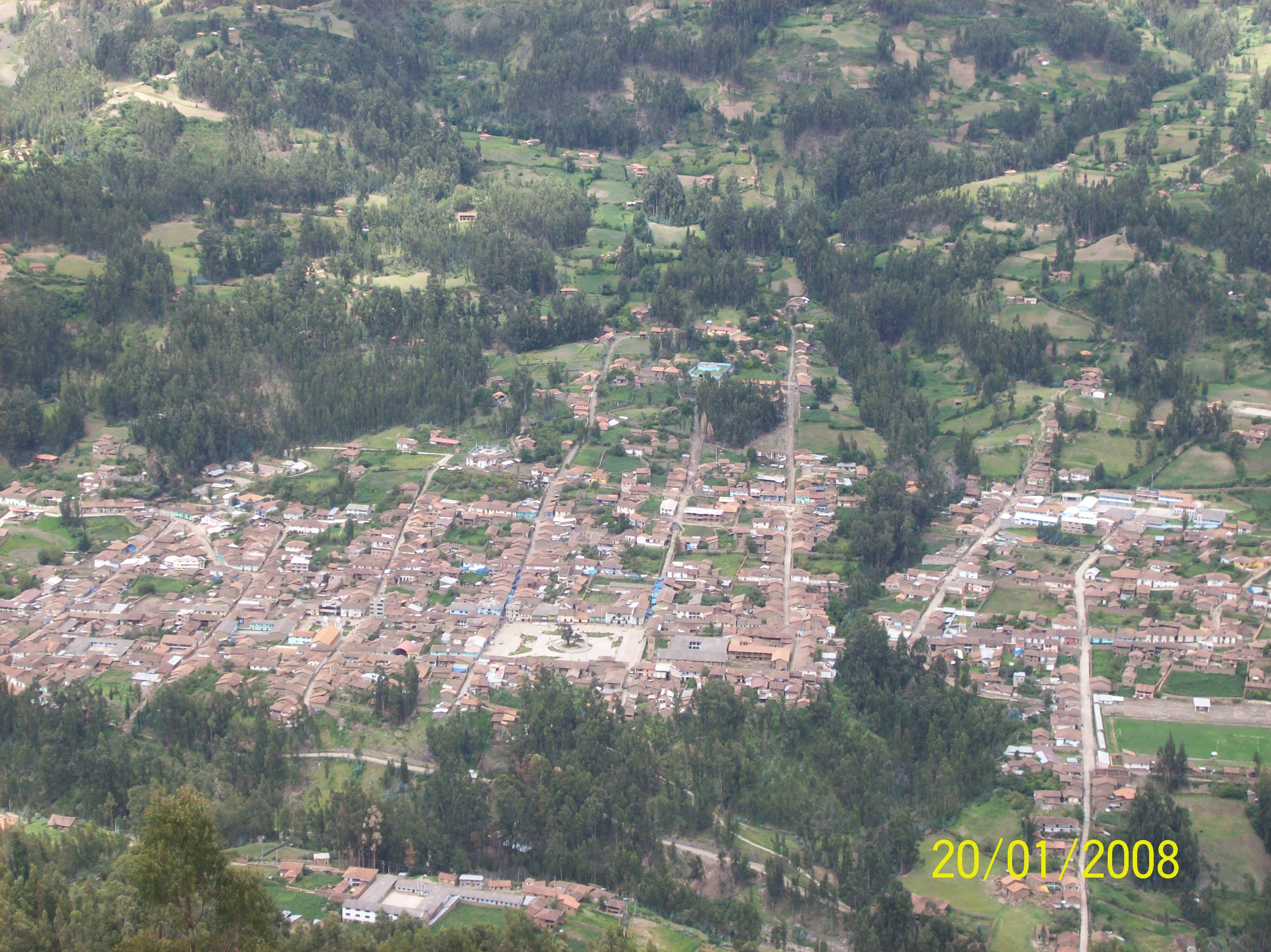
- Pomabamba

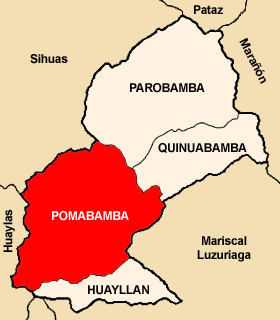
- Location of Pomabamba in the Pomabamba province
- Country: Peru
- Region: Ancash
- Province: Pomabamba
- Founded: February 21, 1861
- Capital: Pumapampa

Government
  - Mayor: Julian Watson Cirilo Diestra (2007)

Area
  - Total: 347.92 km^{2} (134.33 sq mi)
- Elevation: 2,948 m (9,672 ft)

Population (2005 census)
  - Total: 14,780
  - Density: 42.48/km^{2} (110.0/sq mi)
- Time zone: UTC-5 (PET)
- UBIGEO: 021601
- Website: munipomabamba.gob.pe

Pomabamba (Quechua Pumaq pampa, pumaq cougar, pampa large plain, "cougar plain") is the largest of 4 districts in the Pomabamba Province of the Ancash Region in Peru.

== Ethnic groups ==
The people in the district are mainly indigenous citizens of Quechua descent. Quechua is the language which the majority of the population (76.16%) learnt to speak in childhood, 23.62% of the residents started speaking using the Spanish language (2007 Peru Census).

== Climate ==
Climate data for Pomabamba, elevation 2,985 m (9,793 ft), (1991–2020)
Month	Jan	Feb	Mar	Apr	May	Jun	Jul	Aug	Sep	Oct	Nov	Dec	Year
Mean daily maximum °C (°F)	21.6 (70.9)	21.3 (70.3)	20.9 (69.6)	21.2 (70.2)	21.9 (71.4)	21.9 (71.4)	22.1 (71.8)	22.5 (72.5)	22.5 (72.5)	22.3 (72.1)	22.7 (72.9)	21.7 (71.1)	21.9 (71.4)
Mean daily minimum °C (°F)	7.3 (45.1)	7.6 (45.7)	7.5 (45.5)	7.4 (45.3)	6.1 (43.0)	4.4 (39.9)	3.9 (39.0)	4.5 (40.1)	5.9 (42.6)	6.8 (44.2)	7.0 (44.6)	7.4 (45.3)	6.3 (43.4)
Average precipitation mm (inches)	140.9 (5.55)	133.2 (5.24)	148.2 (5.83)	102.7 (4.04)	40.0 (1.57)	12.0 (0.47)	6.8 (0.27)	10.5 (0.41)	36.6 (1.44)	99.7 (3.93)	91.6 (3.61)	145.2 (5.72)	967.4 (38.08)
Source: National Meteorology and Hydrology Service of Peru

== See also ==
- Ancash Quechua

== See also ==
- Pukahirka
- Tawllirahu
- Tinya palla
- Wira Wira
