= Pinkillu =

Flute

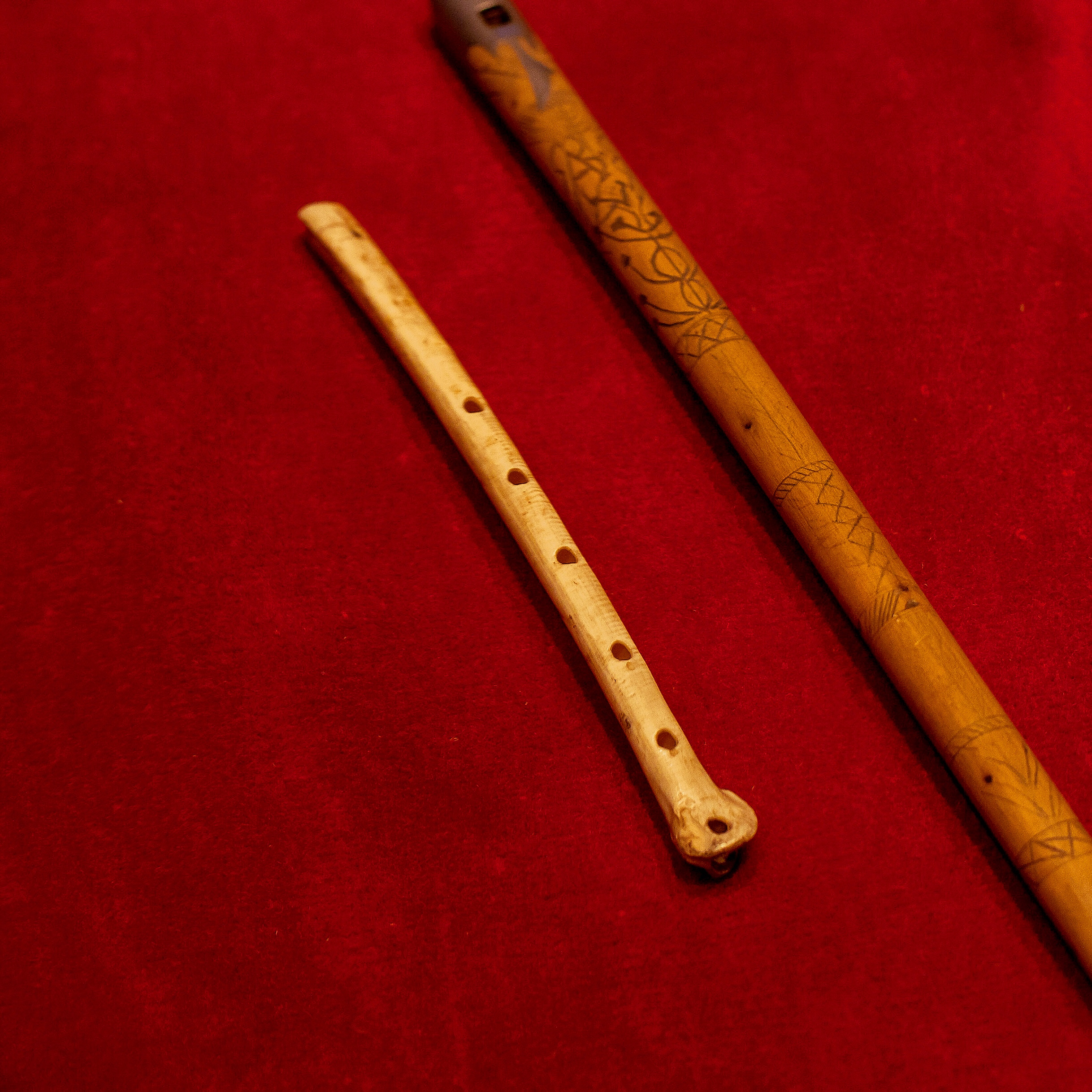
The pinquillo is a wind instrument used in Peruvian culture, especially in the Andes.

A pinkillu, pinkuyllu or pinqullu (Quechua or Aymara, Hispanicized spellings pincollo, pincuyllo, pingullo, pinquillo, also pinkillo, pinkiyo, pinkullo, pinkuyo) is a flute found throughout the Andes, used primarily in Argentina northwest, Bolivia, Chile, Ecuador and Peru. It is usually played with one hand, leaving the other one free to accompany oneself on a drum like the tinya. It is used in a variety of public festivals and other kinds of communal ceremonies.

== Construction and materials ==
The pinkillu can measure in length up to 1 meter 20 cm, and has six finger holes. It is most commonly made out of cane, but can be made out of bamboo, bone, or tree branches as well. In Peru and Bolivia, sheep and llama nerves are used to tie the instrument together. Among the different kinds there are ch'aka pinkillu (bone flute), qina qina pinkillu (cane flute) and tupa pinkillu (made out of thicker tuquru cane).

== Cultural uses and significance ==
The pinkillu has great cultural significance. In the Andes the instrument is played during the early rainy season to celebrate cattle and farming. The pinkillu is often played in pairs or ensembles during the rainy season and at festivals. In Bolivia it is believed that the pinkillu made from cane attracts rainfall. The pinkillu is moistened with alcohol or water before playing, and is associated with fertility.

== See also ==
- Andean music
- Qina
- Tarka (flute)
