= Puka Ranra (Yungay) =

Mountain in Peru

- Location within Peru

Highest point
- Elevation: 4,600 m (15,100 ft)
- Coordinates: 9°15′57″S 77°48′56″W

Geography
- Location: Peru, Ancash Region
- Parent range: Andes, Cordillera Negra

Puka Ranra (Quechua puka red, ranra stony; stony ground, "red, stony ground", also spelled Pucaranra) is a mountain in the Cordillera Negra in the Andes of Peru which reaches a height of approximately 4,600 m (15,100 ft). It is located in the Ancash Region, Yungay Province, Quillo District. Puka Ranra lies southwest of a lake named Qanchisqucha (Quechua for "seven lakes").
