= Shupluy District =

Coordinates: 9°12′00″S 77°40′59″W

Shupluy
- District
- Interactive map of Shupluy
- Country: Peru
- Region: Ancash
- Province: Yungay
- Founded: January 2, 1857
- Capital: Shupluy

Area
  - Total: 162.21 km^{2} (62.63 sq mi)
- Elevation: 2,538 m (8,327 ft)

Population (2005 census)
  - Total: 2,382
  - Density: 14.68/km^{2} (38.03/sq mi)
- Time zone: UTC-5 (PET)
- UBIGEO: 022007

Shupluy District is one of eight districts of the Yungay Province in Peru.

== Ethnic groups ==
The people in the district are mainly indigenous citizens of Quechua descent. Quechua is the language which the majority of the population (86.52%) learnt to speak in childhood, 13.29% of the residents started speaking using the Spanish language (2007 Peru Census).

== See also ==
- Kima Tullpa
- Puka Hirka
