= Pomabamba province =

Coordinates: 8.833°S 77.467°W

Pomabamba Puma Pampa
- Province
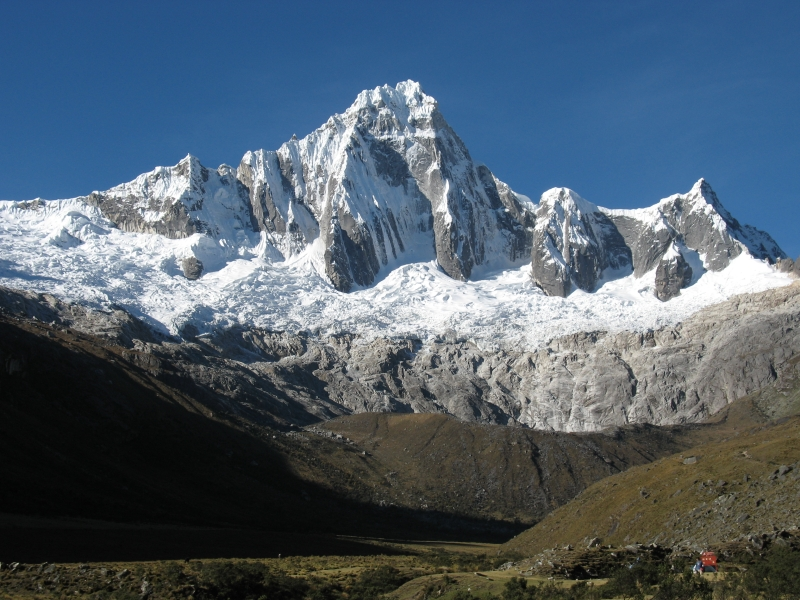
- Tawllirahu

- Coat of arms

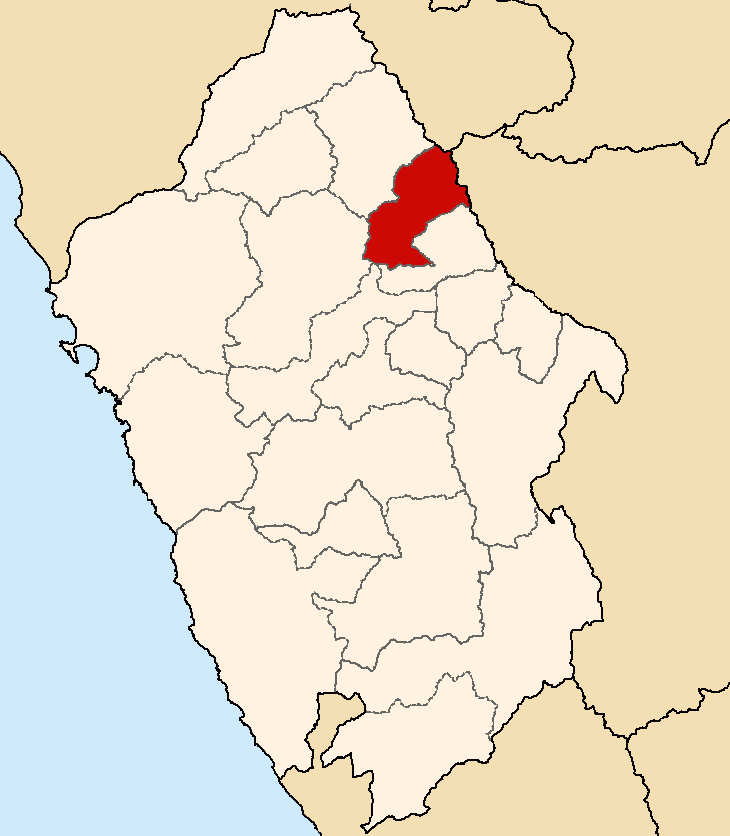
- Location of Pomabamba; Puma Pampa in the Ancash Region
- Country: Peru
- Region: Ancash
- Capital: Pumapampa

Government
  - Mayor: Juan Ponte (2007)

Area
  - Total: 2,973.83 km^{2} (1,148.20 sq mi)

Population (2017)
  - Total: 24,794
  - Density: 8.3374/km^{2} (21.594/sq mi)
- UBIGEO: 0216
- Website: www.munipomabamba.gob.pe

Pomabamba (Quechua Puma Pampa) is one of twenty provinces of the Ancash Region in Peru. It was formerly called Pumapampa (Quechua for "cougar plain") and today it is also known as "The City of Cedars". It is located at the left bank of the Pomabamba river, at 3,063 meters (10,049 ft) above sea level. It was created by law on February 21, 1861.

In this vast region some archaeological sites like Ichik Yaynu, Willka Marka, Runa Marka and the gigantic stone constructions of Yaynu were found with features of the Recuay Culture.

For these ancient copper-colored and fecund places, one of the biggest pre-inca confederations was created, the powerful confederation of conchucos. It was an iron agglomeration of people that presented a hard resistance to the Inca and Spanish armies. During the Republic, Marshal Ramón Castilla visited Pomabamba and fell in love with the Ancash woman from Llumpa, Margarita Mariluz.

== Geography ==
One of the highest peaks of the district is Puka Hirka at approximately 4,400 m (14,400 ft). Other mountains are listed below:

- Hatun Raqra
- Kimsa Hirka
- Kuntur Wasi
- Misa
- Paña Hirka
- Pirilla Hirka
- Puka Hanka
- Puka Qishqi
- Pukarahu
- Puka Yaku Hirka
- Puma Hirka
- Qillqa Qaqa
- Qucha
- Runtu Hirka
- Tawlli
- Tawllirahu
- Tuku Mach'ay
- Tuqtu Pampa
- Usnu Hirka
- Waychaw
- Wira Wira
- Yana Hirka
- Yana Qucha
- Yana Qullpa

== Political division ==
Pomabamba is divided into four districts, which are:

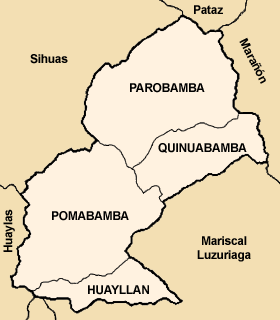
Map of the Pomabamba province showing its districts

- Huayllán
- Parobamba
- Pomabamba
- Quinuabamba

== Ethnic groups ==
The people in the province are mainly indigenous citizens of Quechua descent. Quechua is the language which the majority of the population (84.83%) learnt to speak in childhood, 14.90% of the residents started speaking using the Spanish language (2007 Peru Census).

== See also ==
- Tinya palla
