= Tinya =

Andean percussion instrument

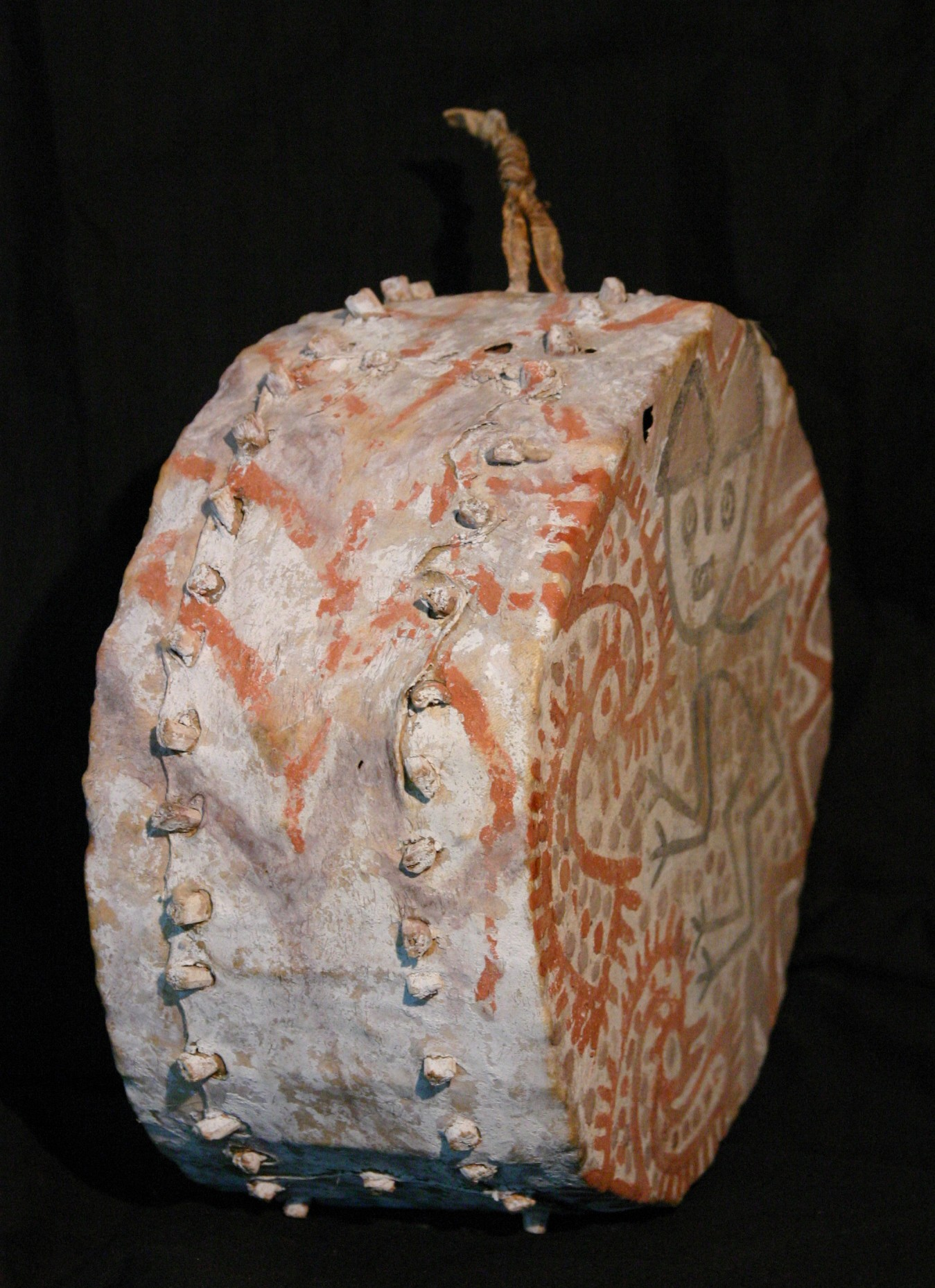
Chancay 1000-1450 AD Lombards Museum

The tinya (Quechua) or kirki (Quechua) is a percussion instrument, a small handmade drum of leather which is used in the traditional music of the Andean region, particularly Peru. The drum dates to the pre-Columbian era, and is used in traditional Peruvian dances, notably in Los Danzantes de Levanto where it is played by one person simultaneously with the antara, a type of panflute; that instrument combination is similar to the worldwide tradition of the pipe and tabor.

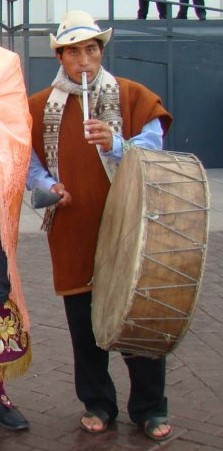
Musician plays Pinkullo flute with one hand and drums a tinya with the other at a Huari Danza in Peru.
