= Peru =

Country in South America

Republic of Peru
República del Perú (Spanish)
(in co-official languages) (Note: In Peru, other languages have been officially recognized as legitimate autochthonous languages, which are co-official alongside Spanish in those areas where they predominate.: Quechua: Piruw Ripuwlika; Aymara: Piruwxa Ripuwlika)
Aymara	Piruwxa Ripuwlika
Quechua	Piruw Ripuwlika
- Flag Coat of arms
- Motto: "Firme y feliz por la unión" (Spanish) "Firm and Happy for the Union"
- Anthem: "Himno Nacional del Perú" (Spanish) "National Anthem of Peru" March: "Marcha de Banderas" (Spanish) "March of Flags"
- National seal Gran Sello del Estado (Spanish); Great Seal of the State

- Location of Peru (dark green)
- Capital and largest city: Lima; 12°2.6′S 77°1.7′W
- Official languages: Spanish
- Co-official languages (Note: In those areas where they predominate.): Quechua; Aymara; Other Indigenous languages
- Ethnic groups (2025): 61.80% Mestizo; 20.74% Native; 17.16% Quechua; 2.00% Aymara; 0.38% Aguaruna; 1.20% other; 8.95% White; 6.04% Black; 0.14% East Asian; 0.08% Nikkei; 0.06% Tusan; 1.94% other; 0.39% no answer
- Religion (2017 (Note: The question about religion included in the 2017 National Census was addressed to people aged 12 and over.)): 94.5% Christianity; 76.0% Catholic; 18.5% other Christian; 5.1% no religion; 0.4% other
- Demonym: Peruvian
- Government: Unitary semi-presidential republic
  - President: Keiko Fujimori
  - First Vice President: Luis Galarreta
  - Second Vice President: Miki Torres
  - Prime Minister: Luis Galarreta
  - President of the Senate: Miki Torres
  - President of the Chamber of Deputies: Óscar Reto
- Legislature: Congress of the Republic
  - Upper house: Senate
  - Lower house: Chamber of Deputies

Independence from Spain
  - Declared: 28 July 1821
  - Consolidated: 9 December 1824
  - Recognized: 14 August 1879

Area
  - Total: 1,285,216 km^{2} (496,225 sq mi) (19th)
  - Water (%): 0.41

Population
  - 2023 estimate: ▲34,352,720 (44th)
  - 2025 census: 34,157,732
  - Density: 23/km^{2} (59.6/sq mi) (198th)
- GDP (PPP): 2026 estimate
  - Total: ▲$703.327 billion (46th)
  - Per capita: ▲$20,238 (99th)
- GDP (nominal): 2026 estimate
  - Total: ▲$399.593 billion (44th)
  - Per capita: ▲$11,498 (86th)
- Gini (2022): ▼40.2 medium inequality
- HDI (2023): ▲0.794 high (79th)
- Currency: Peruvian sol (PEN)
- Time zone: UTC−05:00 (PET)
- Date format: dd/mm/yyyy (CE)
- Calling code: +51
- ISO 3166 code: PE
- Internet TLD: .pe

Peru, (Note: /pəˈruː/ pə-ROO; Spanish: Perú [peˈɾu]; Quechua: Piruw [pɪɾʊw]; Aymara: Piruw [pɪɾʊw]) officially the Republic of Peru, (Note: Spanish: República del Perú) is a country in western South America. It is bordered to the north by Ecuador and Colombia, to the east by Brazil, to the southeast by Bolivia, to the south by Chile, and to the south and west by the Pacific Ocean. Peru is a megadiverse country, with habitats ranging from the arid plains of the Pacific coastal region in the west, to the peaks of the Andes mountains extending from the north to the southeast of the country, to the tropical Amazon basin rainforest in the east with the Amazon River. Peru has a population of over 32 million, and its capital and largest city is Lima. At 1,285,216 km^{2} (496,225 sq mi), Peru is the 19th largest country in the world, and the third largest in South America.

Peruvian territory was home to several cultures during the ancient and medieval periods, and has one of the longest histories of civilization of any country, tracing its heritage back to the 10th millennium BCE Caral–Supe civilization, the earliest civilization in the Americas and considered one of the cradles of civilization. Notable succeeding cultures and civilizations include the Nazca culture, the Moche, Wari and Tiwanaku empires, the Kingdom of Cusco, and the Inca Empire, the largest known state in the pre-Columbian Americas. The Spanish Empire conquered the region in the 16th century and Charles V established a viceroyalty with the official name of the Kingdom of Peru that encompassed most of its South American territories, with its capital in Lima. Higher education started in the Americas with the official establishment of the National University of San Marcos in Lima in 1551.

Peru formally proclaimed independence from Spain in 1821, and following the military campaigns of Bernardo O'Higgins, José de San Martín, and Simón Bolívar, as well as the decisive battle of Ayacucho, it completed its independence in 1824. In the ensuing years, the country first suffered from political instability until a period of relative economic and political stability began due to the exploitation of guano that ended with the War of the Pacific (1879–1884). Throughout the 20th century, Peru grappled with political and social instability, including the internal conflict between the state and guerrilla groups, interspersed with periods of economic growth. Implementation of Plan Verde shifted Peru towards neoliberal economics under the authoritarian rule of Alberto Fujimori and Vladimiro Montesinos in the 1990s, with the former's political ideology of Fujimorism leaving a lasting imprint on the country's governance that continues to the present day. The 2000s marked economic expansion and poverty reduction, but the subsequent decade revealed long-existing sociopolitical vulnerabilities, exacerbated by a political crisis instigated by Congress and the COVID-19 pandemic, precipitating the period of unrest beginning in 2022.

The sovereign state of Peru is a representative democratic republic divided into 25 regions. Its main economic activities include mining, manufacturing, agriculture and fishing, along with other growing sectors such as telecommunications and biotechnology. The country forms part of The Pacific Pumas, a political and economic grouping of countries along Latin America's Pacific coast that share common trends of positive growth, stable macroeconomic foundations, improved governance and an openness to global integration. Peru ranks high in social freedom; it is an active member of the Asia-Pacific Economic Cooperation, the Pacific Alliance, the Comprehensive and Progressive Agreement for Trans-Pacific Partnership and the World Trade Organization; it is regarded as a middle power.

Peru's population includes Mestizos, Amerindians, White people, Afro-descendant people, and Asian people. The main spoken language is Spanish, although a significant number of Peruvians speak Quechuan languages, Aymara, or other Indigenous languages. This mixture of cultural traditions has resulted in a wide diversity of expressions in fields such as art, cuisine, literature, and music. Peru has recently gained international recognition for its vibrant gastronomy, blending Indigenous, Spanish, African, and Asian influences. Lima is now considered a global culinary capital, home to award-winning restaurants like Central and Maido.

== Etymology ==
The name of the country may be derived from Birú, the name of a local ruler who lived near the Bay of San Miguel, Panama City, in the early 16th century. Spanish conquistadors, who arrived in 1522, believed this was the southernmost part of the New World. When Francisco Pizarro invaded the regions farther south, they came to be designated Birú or Perú.

An alternative history is provided by the contemporary writer Inca Garcilaso de la Vega, son of an Inca princess and a conquistador. He said the name Birú belonged to a person who was happened upon by the crew of a ship on an exploratory mission for governor Pedro Arias Dávila and went on to relate more instances of misunderstandings due to the lack of a common language.

The Spanish crown gave the name legal status with the Capitulation of Toledo of 1529, which designated the newly encountered Inca Empire as the province of Peru. In 1561, the rebel Lope de Aguirre declared himself the "Prince" of an independent Peru, which was cut short by his arrest and execution. Under Spanish rule, the country adopted the denomination Viceroyalty of Peru, which became the Peruvian Republic from its independence until 1979, when it adopted its current name of Republic of Peru.

== History ==
=== Prehistory and Pre-Columbian Peru ===
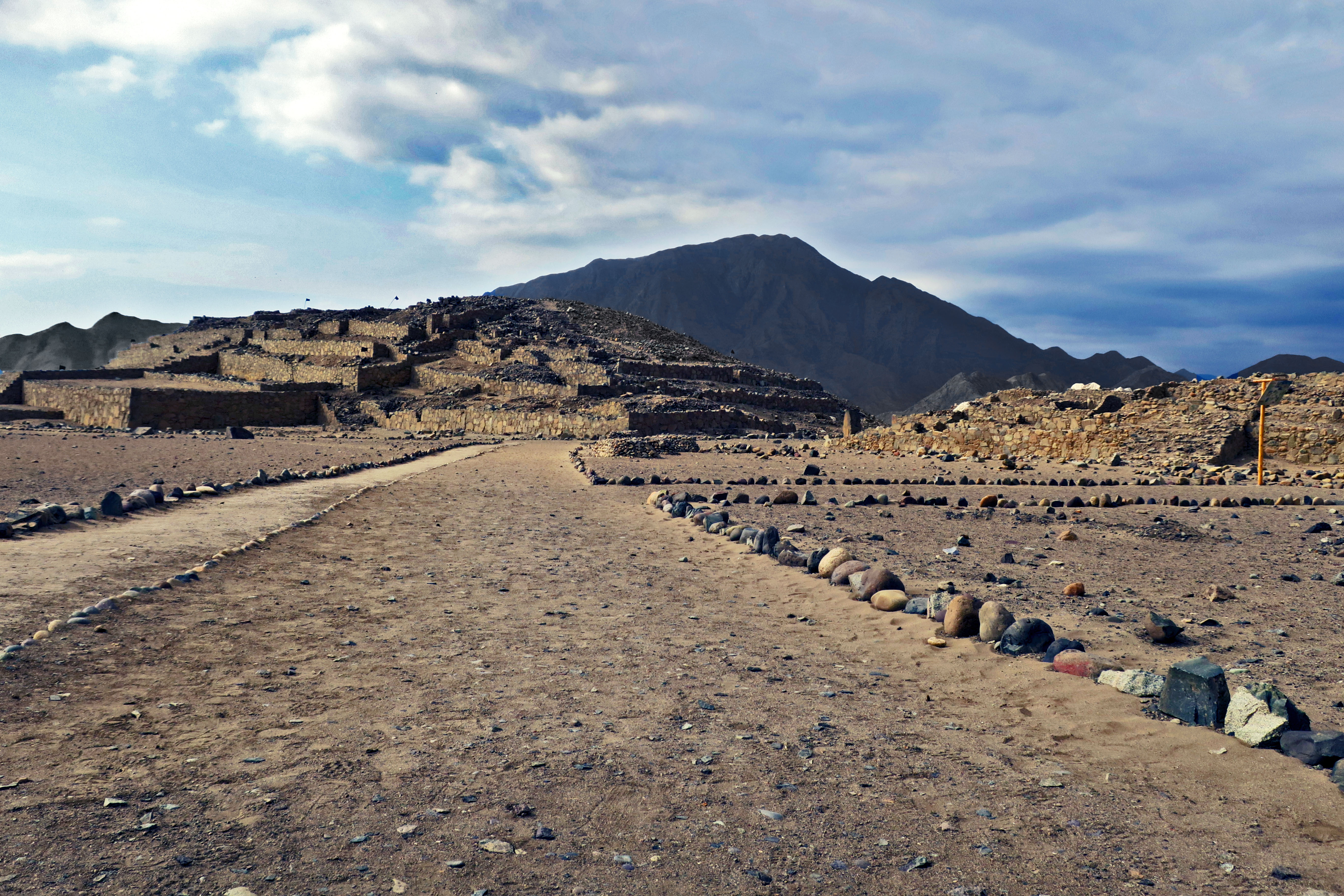
Remains of a Caral/Norte Chico pyramid in the arid Supe Valley

The earliest evidences of human presence in Peruvian territory have been dated to approximately 12,500 BCE in the Huaca Prieta settlement. Andean societies were based on agriculture, using techniques such as irrigation and terracing; camelid husbandry and fishing were also important. Organization relied on reciprocity and redistribution because these societies had no notion of market or money. The oldest known complex society in Peru, the Caral-Supe civilization, flourished along the coast of the Pacific Ocean between 3,000 and 1,800 BCE. These early developments were followed by archaeological cultures that developed mostly around the coastal and Andean regions throughout Peru. The Cupisnique culture which flourished from around 1000 to 200 BCE along what is now Peru's Pacific coast was an example of early pre-Inca culture.

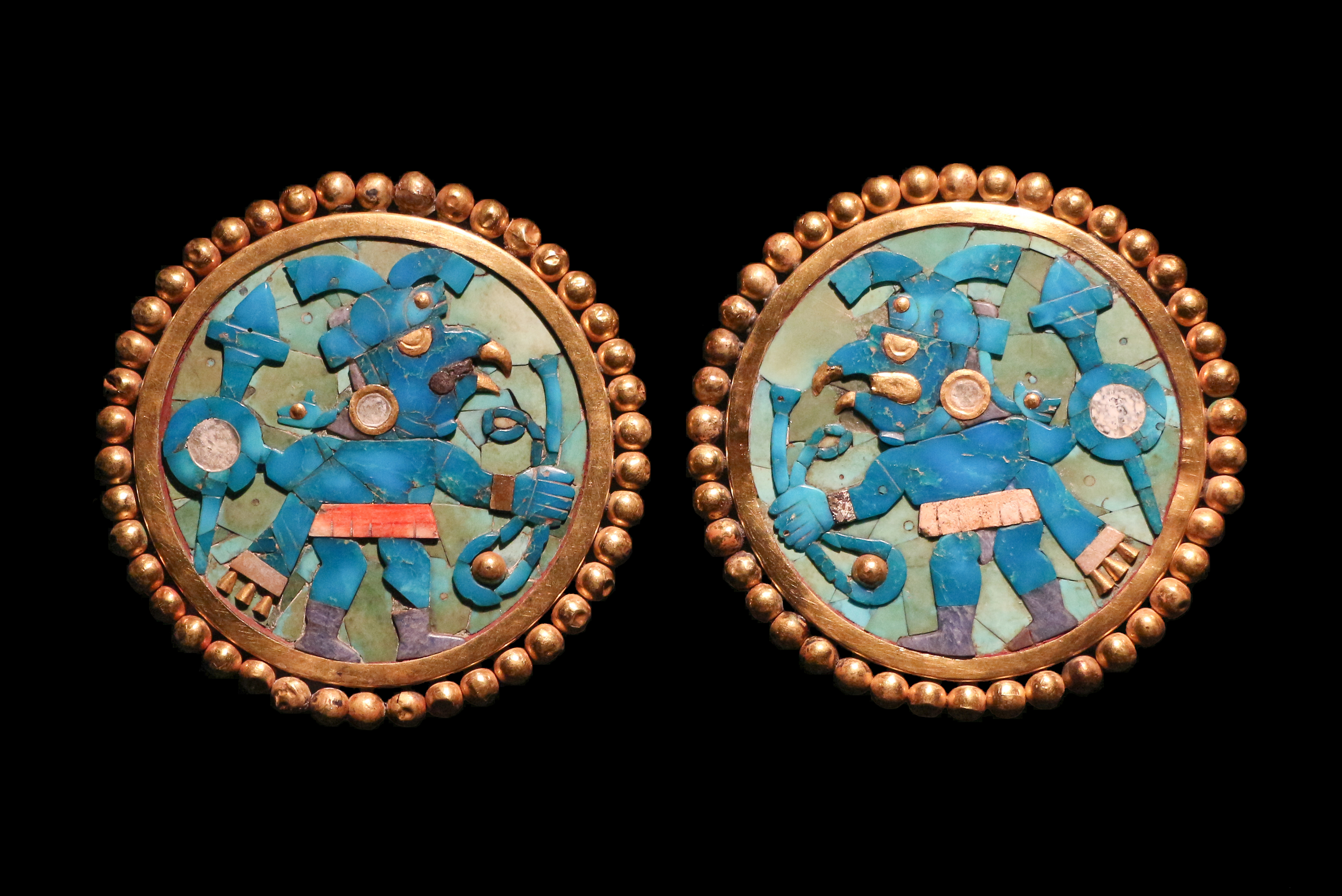
Moche earrings depicting warriors, made of turquoise and gold (1–800 CE)

The Chavín culture that developed from 1500 to 300 BCE was probably more of a religious than a political phenomenon, with their religious center in Chavín de Huantar. After the decline of the Chavin culture around the beginning of the 1st century CE, a series of localized and specialized cultures rose and fell, both on the coast and in the highlands, during the next thousand years. On the coast, these included the civilizations of the Paracas, Nazca, Wari, and the more outstanding Chimu and Moche.

The Moche, who reached their apogee in the first millennium CE, were renowned for their irrigation system which fertilized their arid terrain, their sophisticated ceramic pottery, their lofty buildings, and clever metalwork. The Chimu were the great city builders of pre-Inca civilization; as a loose confederation of walled cities scattered along the coast of northern Peru, the Chimu flourished from about 1140 to 1450. Their capital was at Chan Chan outside of modern-day Trujillo. In the highlands, both the Tiahuanaco culture, near Lake Titicaca in both Peru and Bolivia, and the Wari culture, near the present-day city of Ayacucho, developed large urban settlements and wide-ranging state systems between 500 and 1000 CE.

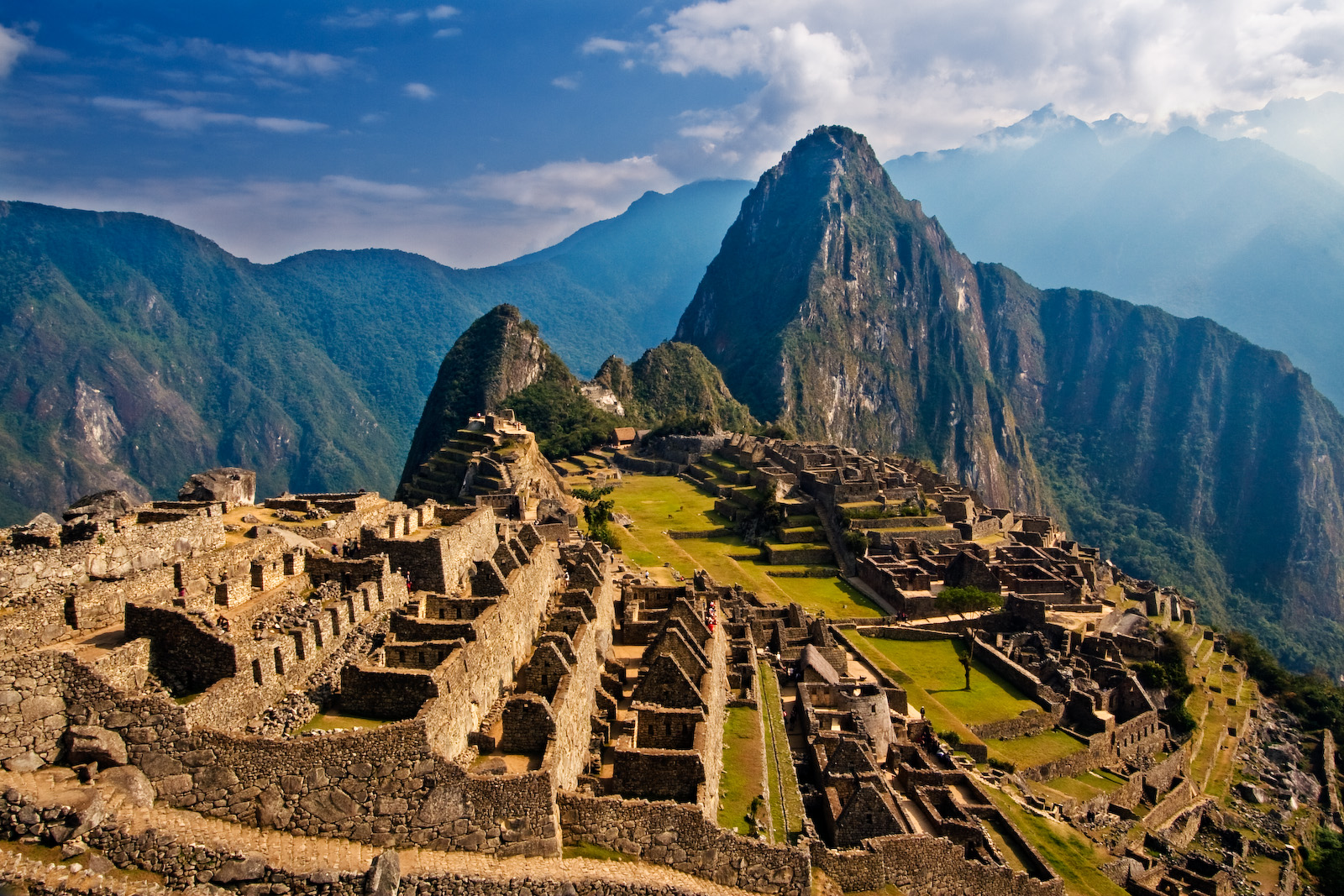
The citadel of Machu Picchu, an iconic symbol of pre-Columbian Peru

In the 15th century, the Incas emerged as a powerful state which, in the span of a century, formed the largest empire in the pre-Columbian Americas with their capital in Cusco. The Incas of Cusco originally represented one of the small and relatively minor ethnic groups, the Quechuas. Gradually, as early as the thirteenth century, they began to expand and incorporate their neighbors. Inca expansion was slow until about the middle of the fifteenth century, when the pace of conquest began to accelerate, particularly under the rule of the emperor Pachacuti. Under his rule and that of his son, Topa Inca Yupanqui, the Incas came to control most of the Andean region, with a population of 9 to 16 million inhabitants under their rule. Pachacuti also promulgated a comprehensive code of laws to govern his far-flung empire, while consolidating his absolute temporal and spiritual authority as the God of the Sun who ruled from a magnificently rebuilt Cusco.

From 1438 to 1533, the Incas used a variety of methods, from conquest to peaceful assimilation, to incorporate a large portion of western South America, centered on the Andean mountain ranges, from southern Colombia to northern Chile, between the Pacific Ocean in the west and the Amazon rainforest in the east. The official language of the empire was Quechua, although hundreds of local languages and dialects were spoken. The Inca referred to their empire as Tawantinsuyu which can be translated as "The Four Regions" or "The Four United Provinces." Many local forms of worship persisted in the empire, most of them concerning local sacred Huacas, but the Inca leadership encouraged the worship of Inti, the sun god and imposed its sovereignty above other cults such as that of Pachamama. The Incas considered their King, the Sapa Inca, to be the "child of the sun."

=== Conquest and colonial period ===
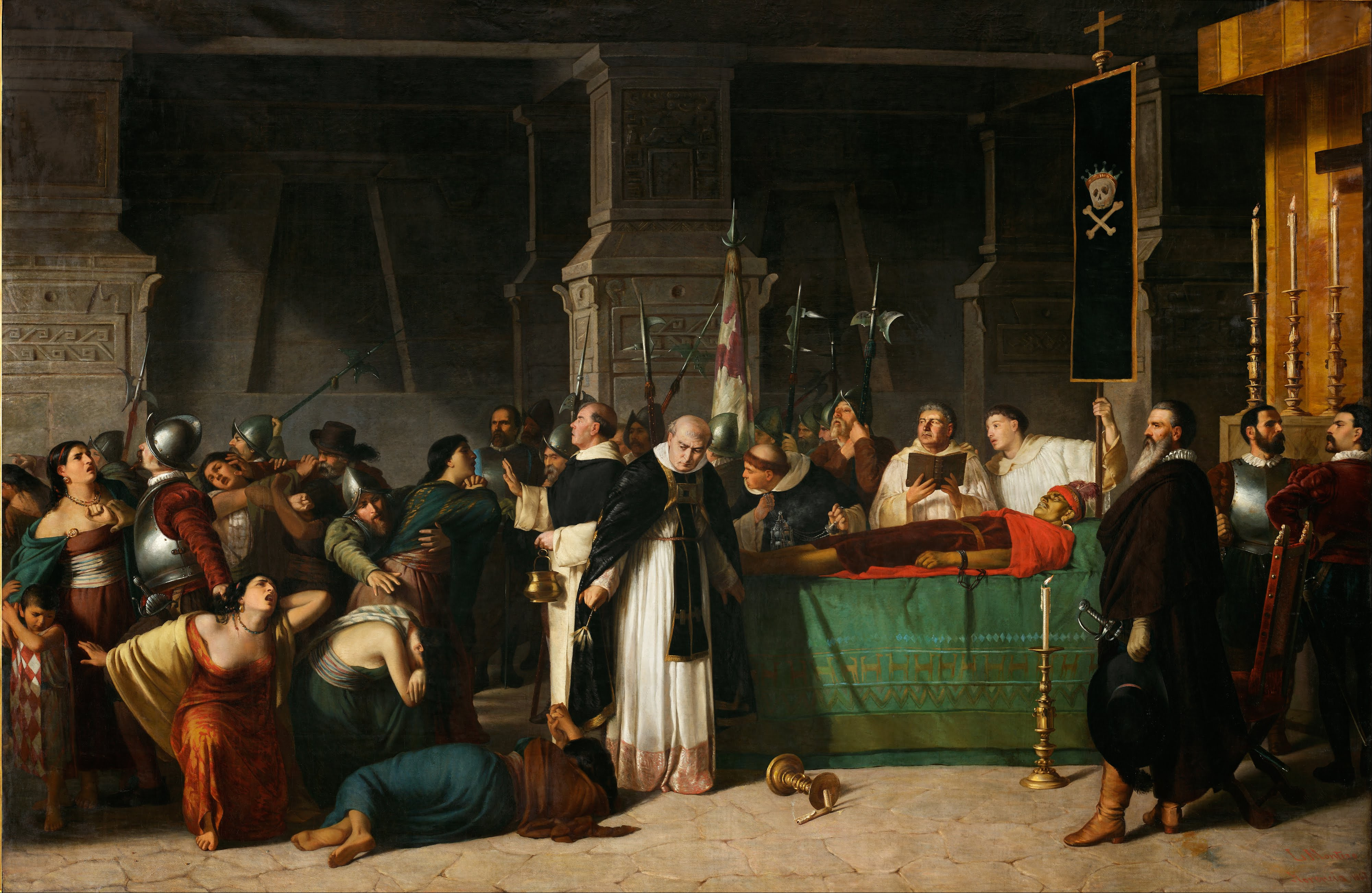
Los funerales de Atahualpa (1867) by Luis Montero. Atahualpa was the last Sapa Inca, executed by the Spaniards on 29 August 1533.

Atahualpa (or Atahuallpa), the last Sapa Inca, became emperor when he defeated and executed his older half-brother Huáscar in a civil war sparked by the death of their father, Inca Huayna Capac. In December 1532, a party of conquistadors (supported by the Chankas, Huancas, Cañaris and Chachapoyas as Indian auxiliaries) led by Francisco Pizarro defeated and captured the Inca Emperor Atahualpa in the Battle of Cajamarca. After years of preliminary exploration and military conflicts, it was the first step in a long campaign that took decades of fighting but ended in Spanish victory and colonization of the region known as the Viceroyalty of Peru with its capital at Lima, which was then known as La Ciudad de los Reyes (The City of Kings). The conquest of Peru led to spin-off campaigns throughout the viceroyalty as well as expeditions towards the Amazon Basin as in the case of Spanish efforts to quell Amerindian resistance. The last Inca resistance was suppressed when the Spaniards annihilated the Neo-Inca State in Vilcabamba in 1572.

The Indigenous population dramatically collapsed overwhelmingly due to epidemic diseases introduced by the Spanish as well as exploitation and socio-economic change. Viceroy Francisco de Toledo reorganized the country in the 1570s with gold and silver mining as its main economic activity and Amerindian forced labor as its primary workforce. With the discovery of the great silver and gold lodes at Potosí (present-day Bolivia) and Huancavelica, the viceroyalty flourished as an important provider of mineral resources. Peruvian bullion provided revenue for the Spanish Crown and fueled a complex trade network that extended as far as Europe and the Philippines. The commercial and population exchanges between Latin America and Asia undergone via the Manila Galleons transiting through Acapulco, had Callao at Peru as the furthest endpoint of the trade route in the Americas. In relation to this, Don Sebastian Hurtado de Corcuera, governor of Panama was also responsible for settling Zamboanga City in the Philippines by employing Peruvian soldiers and colonists. African slaves were added to the labor population to expand the workforce. The expansion of a colonial administrative apparatus and bureaucracy paralleled the economic reorganization.

With the conquest started the spread of Christianity in South America; most people were forcefully converted to Catholicism, with Spanish clerics believing like Puritan divines of English colonies later that the Native Peoples "had been corrupted by the Devil", who was working "through them to frustrate" their foundations. It only took a generation to convert the population. They built churches in every city and replaced some of the Inca temples with churches, such as the Coricancha in the city of Cusco. The church employed the Inquisition, making use of torture to ensure that newly converted Catholics did not stray to other religions or beliefs, and monastery schools, educating girls, especially of the Inca nobility and upper class, "until they were old enough either to profess [to become a nun] or to leave the monastery and assume the role ('estado') in the Christian society that their fathers planned to erect" in Peru. Peruvian Catholicism follows the syncretism found in many Latin American countries, in which religious native rituals have been integrated with Christian celebrations. In this endeavor, the church came to play an important role in the acculturation of the Natives, drawing them into the cultural orbit of the Spanish settlers.

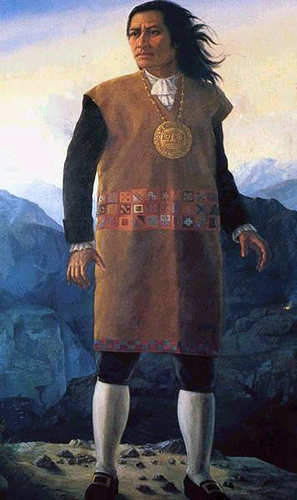
Túpac Amaru II

By the 18th century, declining silver production and economic diversification greatly diminished royal income. In response, the Crown enacted the Bourbon Reforms, a series of edicts that increased taxes and partitioned the Viceroyalty. The new laws provoked Túpac Amaru II's rebellion and other revolts, all of which were suppressed. The rebellion of Tupac Amaru became the most devastating to the Viceroyalty, being the largest revolt in the colonial Americas. Beginning in the Cusco region, it extended to modern-day Bolivia and Argentina, and cooperated with other uprisings such as those led by Tomás and Túpac Katari. The revolt would last from 1780 to 1783. As a result of these and other changes, the Spaniards and their creole successors came to monopolize control over the land, seizing many of the best lands abandoned by the massive native depopulation. However, the Spanish did not resist the Portuguese expansion of Brazil across the meridian. The Treaty of Tordesillas was rendered meaningless between 1580 and 1640 while Spain controlled Portugal. The need to ease communication and trade with Spain led to the split of the viceroyalty and the creation of new viceroyalties of New Granada and Rio de la Plata at the expense of the territories that formed the Viceroyalty of Peru; this reduced the power, prominence and importance of Lima as the viceroyal capital and shifted the lucrative Andean trade to Buenos Aires and Bogotá, while the fall of the mining and textile production accelerated the progressive decay of the Viceroyalty of Peru.

Eventually, the viceroyalty would dissolve, as with much of the Spanish empire, when challenged by national independence movements at the beginning of the nineteenth century. These movements led to the formation of the majority of modern-day countries of South America in the territories that at one point or another had constituted the Viceroyalty of Peru. The conquest and colony brought a mix of cultures and ethnicities that did not exist before the Spanish conquered the Peruvian territory. Even though many of the Inca traditions were lost or diluted, new customs, traditions and knowledge were added, creating a rich mixed Peruvian culture. Two of the most important Indigenous rebellions against the Spanish were the Juan Santos Rebellion led by Juan Santos Atahualpa in 1742, and the largest of the two being the Rebellion of Túpac Amaru II in 1780 around the highlands near Cuzco and Bolivia. In 1780, direct trade between Manila, Philippines at Asia; and Callao, Peru; in South America, was officially established.

=== Independence ===
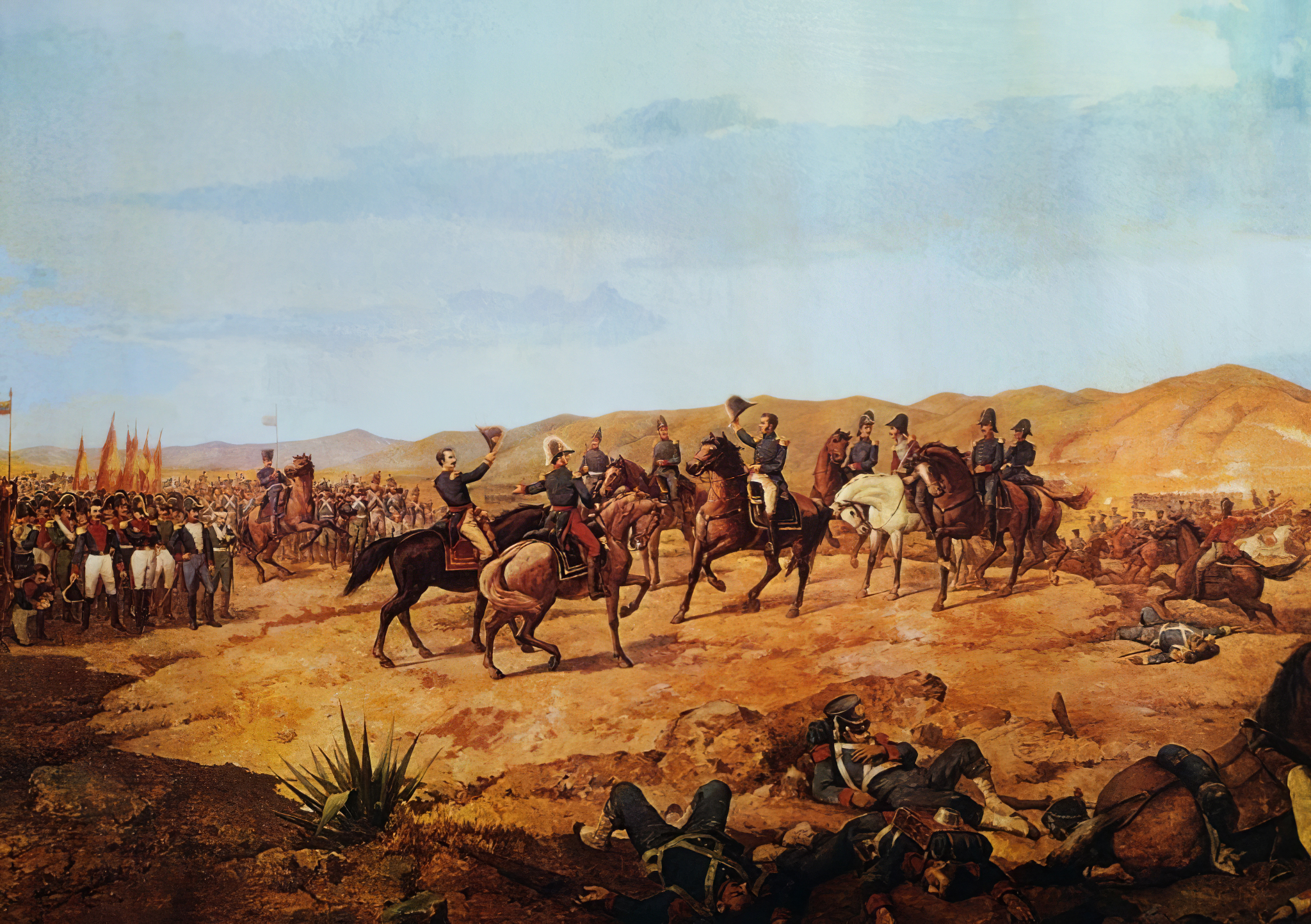
The Battle of Ayacucho was decisive in ensuring Peruvian independence.

In the early 19th century, while most South American nations were swept by wars of independence, Peru remained a royalist stronghold. As the elite vacillated between emancipation and loyalty to the Spanish monarchy, independence was achieved only after the occupation by military campaigns of José de San Martín and Simón Bolívar.

The economic crises, the loss of power of Spain in Europe, the war of independence in North America, and Native uprisings all contributed to a favorable climate to the development of emancipation ideas among the Criollo population in South America. However, the Criollo oligarchy in Peru enjoyed privileges and remained loyal to the Spanish Crown. The liberation movement started in Argentina where autonomous juntas were created as a result of the loss of authority of the Spanish government over its colonies.

After fighting for the independence of the Viceroyalty of Rio de la Plata, José de San Martín created the Army of the Andes and crossed the Andes in 21 days. Once in Chile, he joined forces with Chilean army General Bernardo O'Higgins and liberated the country in the battles of Chacabuco and Maipú in 1818. On 7 September 1820, a fleet of eight warships arrived in the port of Paracas under the command of General José de San Martín and Thomas Cochrane, who was serving in the Chilean Navy. Immediately on 26 October, they took control of the town of Pisco. San Martín settled in Huacho on 12 November, where he established his headquarters while Cochrane sailed north and blockaded the port of Callao in Lima. At the same time in the north, Guayaquil was occupied by rebel forces under the command of Gregorio Escobedo. Because Peru was the stronghold of the Spanish government in South America, San Martín's strategy to liberate Peru was to use diplomacy. He sent representatives to Lima urging the Viceroy that Peru be granted independence, however, all negotiations proved unsuccessful.

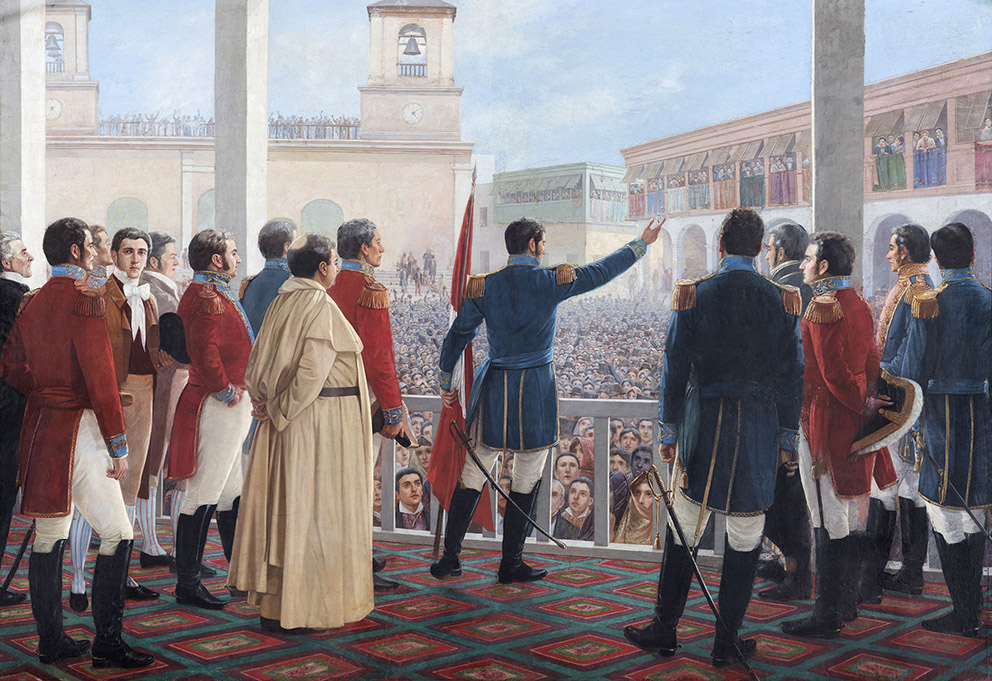
San Martín proclaiming the independence of Peru. Painting by Juan Lepiani.

The Viceroy of Peru, Joaquín de la Pazuela, named José de la Serna commander-in-chief of the loyalist army to protect Lima from the threatened invasion by San Martín. On 29 January, de la Serna organized a coup against de la Pazuela, which was recognized by Spain and he was named Viceroy of Peru. This internal power struggle contributed to the success of the liberating army. To avoid a military confrontation, San Martín met with the newly appointed viceroy, José de la Serna, and proposed to create a constitutional monarchy. The proposal was turned down. De la Serna abandoned the city, and on 12 July 1821, San Martín occupied Lima and declared Peruvian independence on 28 July 1821. He created the first Peruvian flag. Upper Peru (present-day Bolivia) remained as a Spanish stronghold until the army of Simón Bolívar liberated it three years later. José de San Martín was then declared Protector of Peru. National identity was forged during this period, primarily. As Bolivarian projects for a Latin American Confederation floundered, a union with Bolivia proved ephemeral.

Simón Bolívar launched his campaign from the north, liberating the Viceroyalty of New Granada in the Battles of Carabobo in 1821 and Pichincha a year later. In July 1822, Bolívar and San Martín gathered in the Guayaquil Conference. Bolívar was left in charge of fully liberating Peru while San Martín retired from politics after the first parliament was assembled. The newly founded Peruvian Congress named Bolívar dictator of Peru, giving him the power to organize the military.

With the help of Antonio José de Sucre, they defeated the larger Spanish army in the Battle of Junín on 6 August 1824 and the decisive Battle of Ayacucho on 9 December of the same year, consolidating the independence of Peru and Upper Peru. Upper Peru was later established as Bolivia. During the early years of the Republic, endemic struggles for power between military leaders caused political instability.

=== 19th century ===
Once independence was proclaimed, San Martín assumed military-political command of the free departments of Peru, under the title of Protector, according to a decree given on 3 August 1821. The works of the Protectorate contributed to the creation of the National Library (in favor of knowledge), the approval of the National Anthem, and the abolition of the mita (in favor of the indigenous people). On 27 December 1821, San Martín created three ministries: Ministry of State and Foreign Affairs, committing Juan García del Río; Ministry of War and Navy, to Bernardo de Monteagudo; and Ministry of Finance, to Hipólito Unanue.

From the 1840s to the 1860s Peru enjoyed a period of stability under the presidency of Ramón Castilla, through increased state revenues from guano exports. In 1864, a Spanish expedition occupied the Chincha Islands (guano producers) and unleashed an international incident with great consequences in Peruvian internal politics, which led to a coup d'état against President Juan Antonio Pezet, Mariano's government. Peru, with the help of Bolivia, Chile and Ecuador, sent a declaration of war on Spain. After the battle of Callao on 2 May 1866, the Spanish Navy withdrew from Peru. The government of José Balta was lavished on infrastructure (i.e., the construction of the Central Railway), the first signs of excess governmental spending becoming apparent. By the 1870s the guano resources had been depleted, the country was heavily indebted, and political in-fighting was again on the rise.

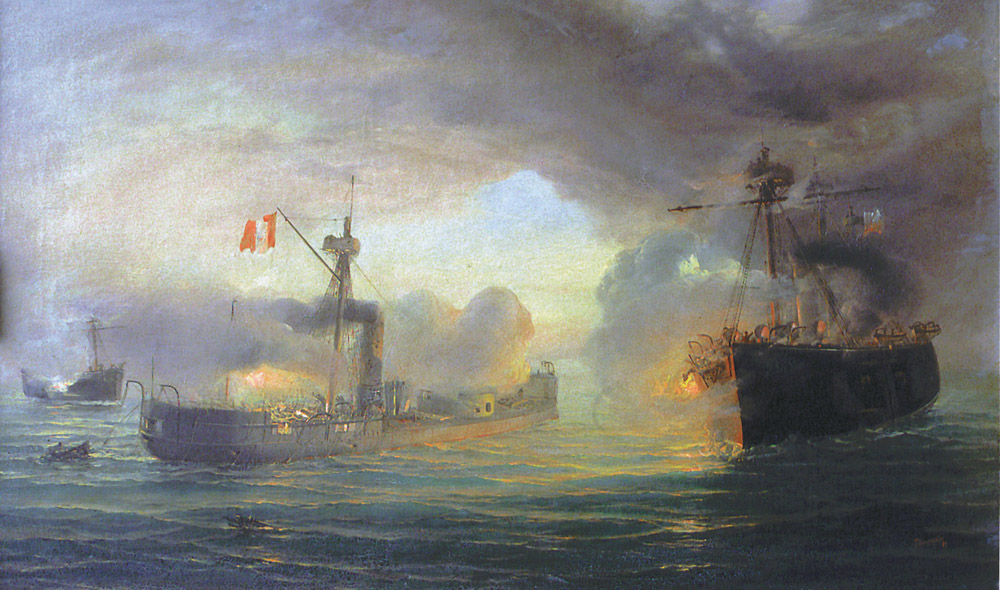
The Battle of Angamos, during the War of the Pacific

By 1859, some 41,000 Peruvians had died in the constant civil wars that had shaken the country since 1829. Thanks to the money from the sale of guano, Peru began to modernize—civil and military bureaucracy grew, indigenous people stopped paying tribute, enslaved people achieved their freedom, and migration policies for Germans, Austrians, Irish, and Italians began to pick up steam.

On 5 April 1879, Chile declared war on Peru, unleashing the War of the Pacific, which lasted until 1884. The casus belli was the confrontation between Bolivia and Chile over a tax problem in which Peru was compromised by the Treaty of Defensive Alliance, signed with Bolivia in 1873. However, Peruvian historiography is unanimous in maintaining that the deep cause of this war was Chile's ambition to take over the nitrate and guano territories of southern Peru. In the first stage of the war, the Peruvian navy repelled the Chilean attack until 8 October 1879. That day, the naval combat of Angamos was fought, where the Chilean navy and its ships Cochrane, Blanco Encalada, Loa, and Covadonga cornered the monitor Huáscar, the main ship of the Peruvian navy commanded by Admiral AP Miguel Grau. He died in the fray, quickly becoming Peru's greatest hero.

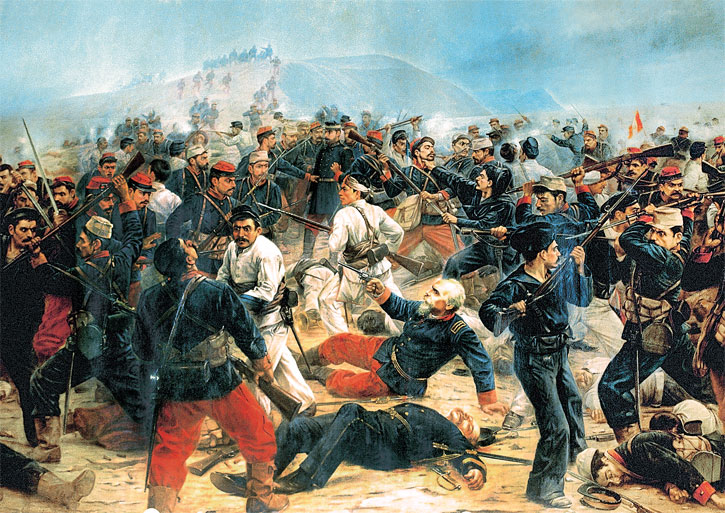
Battle of Arica, painted by Juan Lepiani

Almost five years of war ended in the loss of the department of Tarapacá and the provinces of Tacna and Arica in the Atacama region. Francisco Bolognesi and Miguel Grau are both renowned heroes of the war. Originally, Chile committed to a referendum for the cities of Arica and Tacna to be held years later, meant to self determine their national affiliation. However, Chile refused to apply the Treaty, and neither of the countries could determine the statutory framework. The War of the Pacific was the bloodiest war the country has fought in, and after the war an extraordinary effort of rebuilding began. The government started to initiate a number of social and economic reforms to recover from the damage of the war. Political stability was achieved only in the early 1900s.

=== 20th century ===
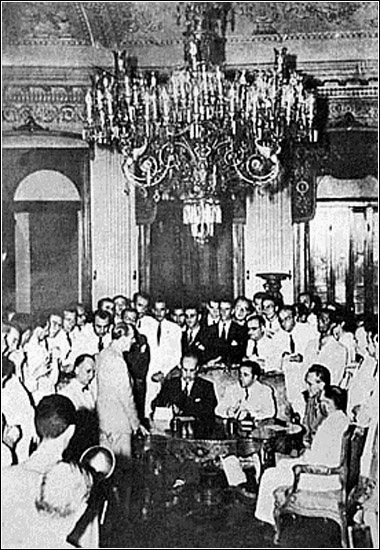
The signing of the Rio Protocol in January 1942

Internal struggles after the war were followed by a period of stability under the Civilista Party, which lasted until the onset of the authoritarian regime of Augusto B. Leguía. The Great Depression caused the downfall of Leguía, renewed political turmoil, and the emergence of the American Popular Revolutionary Alliance (APRA). The rivalry between this organization and a coalition of the elite and the military defined Peruvian politics for the following three decades. A final peace treaty in 1929, signed between Peru and Chile called the Treaty of Lima, returned Tacna to Peru. Between 1932 and 1933, Peru was engulfed in a year-long war with Colombia over a territorial dispute involving the Amazonas Department and its capital Leticia.

In 1941 Peru and Ecuador fought the Ecuadorian–Peruvian War, after which the Rio Protocol sought to formalize the boundary between those two countries. In a military coup on 29 October 1948, General Manuel A. Odría became president. Odría's presidency was known as the Ochenio. He came down hard on APRA, momentarily pleasing the oligarchy and all others on the right, but followed a populist course that won him great favor with the poor and lower classes. A thriving economy allowed him to indulge in expensive but crowd-pleasing social policies. At the same time, however, civil rights were severely restricted and corruption was rampant throughout his regime. Odría was succeeded by Manuel Prado Ugarteche. However, widespread allegations of fraud prompted the Peruvian military to depose Prado and install a military junta, via a coup d'état led by Ricardo Pérez Godoy. Godoy ran a short transitional government and held new elections in 1963, which were won by Fernando Belaúnde Terry who assumed presidency until 1968. Belaúnde was recognized for his commitment to the democratic process.

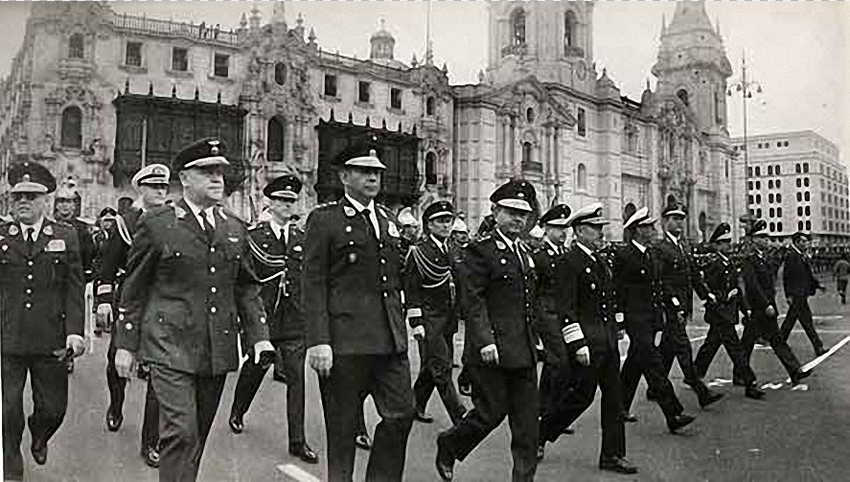
Military Junta of 1968

On 3 October 1968 another coup d'état led by a group of officers led by General Juan Velasco Alvarado brought the army to power with the aim of applying a doctrine of "social progress and integral development", nationalist and reformist, influenced by the United Nations Economic Commission for Latin America and the Caribbean (UNECLAC) theses on dependence and underdevelopment. Six days after the coup, Velasco proceeded to nationalize the International Petroleum Corporation (IPC), the North American company that exploited Peruvian oil, and then launched a reform of the state apparatus, an agrarian reform. It was the biggest agrarian reform ever undertaken in Latin America: it abolished the latifunda system and modernized agriculture through a more equitable redistribution of land (90% of the peasants formed cooperatives or agricultural societies of social interest). Land was to be owned by those who cultivated it, and large landowners were expropriated. The only large properties allowed were cooperatives.

Between 1969 and 1976, 325,000 families received land from the state with an average size of 73.6 acres (29.8 hectares). The "revolutionary government" also planned massive investments in education, elevated the Quechua language – spoken by nearly half the population but hitherto despised by the authorities – to a status equivalent to that of Spanish and established equal rights for natural children. Peru wished to free itself from any dependence and carried out a third-world foreign policy. The United States responded with commercial, economic and diplomatic pressure. In 1973 Peru seemed to triumph over the financial blockade imposed by Washington by negotiating a loan from the International Development Bank to finance its agricultural and mining development policy. The relations with Chile became very tense after the coup d'état of the general Pinochet. General Edgardo Mercado Jarrin (Prime Minister and Commander-in-Chief of the Army) and Admiral Guillermo Faura Gaig (Minister of the Navy) both escaped assassination attempts within weeks of each other. In 1975 General Francisco Morales Bermúdez Cerruti seized power and broke with the policies of his predecessor. His regime occasionally participated in Operation Condor in collaboration with other American military dictatorships.

President Alan García's economic policies distanced Peru from international markets further, resulting in lower foreign investment in the country. After the country experienced chronic inflation, in mid-1985, the Peruvian sol was replaced by the inti, which itself was replaced by the nuevo sol in July 1991 (the new sol had a cumulative value of one billion old soles). At the end of the 1980s, the per capita annual income of Peruvians fell to $720 (below the level of 1960) and Peru's GDP dropped 20%, with national reserves running a $900 million deficit. The economic turbulence of the time acerbated social tensions in Peru and partly contributed to the rise of violent rebel rural insurgent movements, like Sendero Luminoso (Shining Path) and MRTA, which caused great havoc throughout the country.

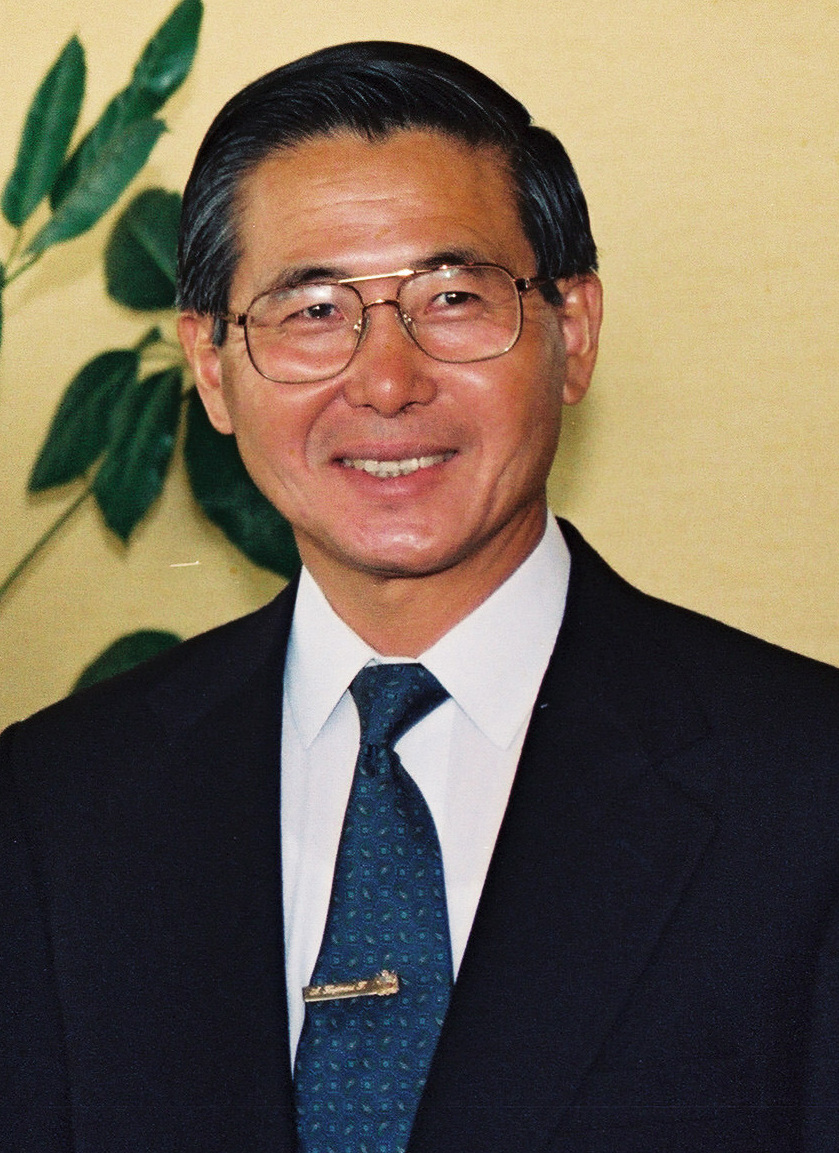
President Alberto Fujimori during his first term

The Peruvian armed forces, frustrated with the inability of the García administration to handle the nation's crises, drafted the Plan Verde, which involved the genocide of impoverished and indigenous Peruvians, the control or censorship of the media in Peru, and the establishment of a neoliberal economy controlled by a military junta. Alberto Fujimori assumed the presidency in 1990 and, according to the head of the National Intelligence Service (SIN) Rospigliosi, an understanding was established between Fujimori, Vladimiro Montesinos, and some of the military officers involved in Plan Verde to abide by the military's demands prior to Fujimori's inauguration. Fujimori would go on to adopt many of the policies outlined in Plan Verde, which led to a precipitous drop in inflation from 7,650% at the start of 1990 to 139% in 1991 and 57% in 1992. When Fujimori faced opposition to his reform efforts, he dissolved Congress, suspending the judiciary, arresting several opposition leaders and assuming full powers in the auto-golpe ("self-coup") of 5 April 1992. He then revised the constitution, called new congressional elections, and implemented substantial economic reform, including privatization of numerous state-owned companies, creation of an investment-friendly climate, and sound management of the economy. Nonetheless, these policies did not benefit the poorest much, and inequality persisted despite Fujimori's economic achievements.

Fujimori's administration was dogged by insurgent groups, most notably Shining Path, which carried out attacks across the country throughout the 1980s and 1990s. Fujimori cracked down on the insurgents and was successful in largely quelling them by the late 1990s, but the fight was marred by atrocities committed by both the Peruvian security forces and the insurgents: the Barrios Altos massacre and La Cantuta massacre by Government paramilitary groups, and the bombings of Tarata and Frecuencia Latina by Sendero Luminoso. Fujimori would also broaden the definition of terrorism in an effort to criminalize as many actions possible to persecute left-wing political opponents. Using the terruqueo, a fearmongering tactic that was used to accuse opponents of terrorism, Fujimori established a cult of personality by portraying himself as a hero and made left-wing ideologies an eternal enemy in Peru. Those incidents subsequently came to symbolize the human rights violations committed in the last years of violence. His Programa Nacional de Población, 'National Population Program' also resulted with the forced sterilization of at least 300,000 poor and indigenous women.

In early 1995, once again Peru and Ecuador clashed in the Cenepa War, but in 1998 the governments of both nations signed a peace treaty that clearly demarcated the international boundary between them. In November 2000, Fujimori resigned from office and went into a self-imposed exile, initially avoiding prosecution for human rights violations and corruption charges by the new Peruvian authorities.

=== 21st century ===
Peru tried to fight corruption while sustaining economic growth at the start of the 21st century, though Fujimorism held power over much of Peruvian society through maintaining control of institutions and legislation created in the 1993 constitution, which was written by Fujimori and his supporters without opposition participation. In spite of human rights progress since the time of insurgency, many problems are still visible and show the continued marginalization of those who suffered through the violence of the Peruvian conflict. A caretaker government presided over by Valentín Paniagua took on the responsibility of conducting new presidential and congressional elections. Afterwards Alejandro Toledo became president in 2001 to 2006. On 28 July 2006, former president Alan García became President of Peru after winning the 2006 elections. In 2006, Alberto Fujimori's daughter, Keiko Fujimori, entered Peru's political arena to continue her father's legacy and espouse Fujimorism. In May 2008, Peru became a member of the Union of South American Nations. In April 2009, former president Alberto Fujimori was convicted of human rights violations and sentenced to 25 years in prison for his role in killings and kidnappings by the Grupo Colina death squad during his government's battle against leftist guerrillas in the 1990s.

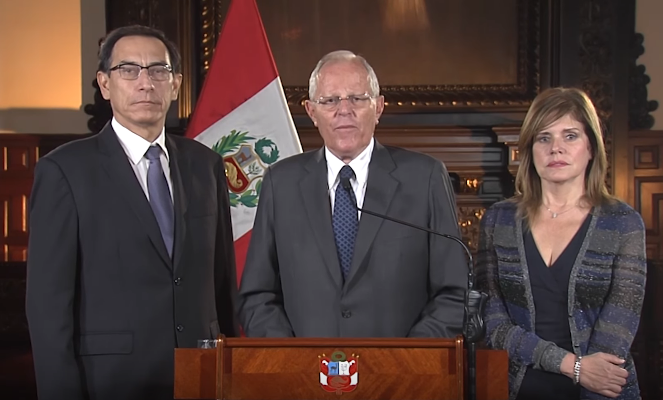
President Pedro Pablo Kuczynski next to his vice-presidents, Martín Vizcarra and Mercedes Aráoz, a speech prior to his first impeachment vote.

During the presidencies of Ollanta Humala, Pedro Pablo Kuczynski and Martín Vizcarra, the right-wing Congress led by Keiko Fujimori obstructed much of the actions performed by the presidents. On 5 June 2011, Ollanta Humala was elected president, with his cabinet being successfully censured by the Fujimorist Congress. Beginning with Pedro Pablo Kuczynski, Congress used broadly interpreted impeachment wording in the 1993 Constitution of Peru that allowed impeachment of the president without cause to place pressure on the president, forcing him to resign in 2018 amid various controversies surrounding his administration. Vice president Martín Vizcarra then assumed office in March 2018 with generally favorable approval ratings as he led the anti-corruption constitutional referendum movement.

The COVID-19 pandemic resulted with Peru experiencing the highest death rate from COVID-19 in the world, exposing much of the inequality that persisted since the Fujimori administration and triggering an economic crisis that led to Vizcara's removal from the presidency by Congress. Widely seen as a coup by Congress, its head, the newly seated President Manuel Merino, faced protests across the country, and after five days, Merino resigned from the presidency. Merino was replaced by President Francisco Sagasti, who led a provisional, centrist government, and enforced many of Vizcarra's former policies. Elections were held on 11 April 2021, and Pedro Castillo of the Free Peru party won the first round, followed closely by Keiko Fujimori, with right-wing parties allied with Fujimori maintaining positions in Congress.

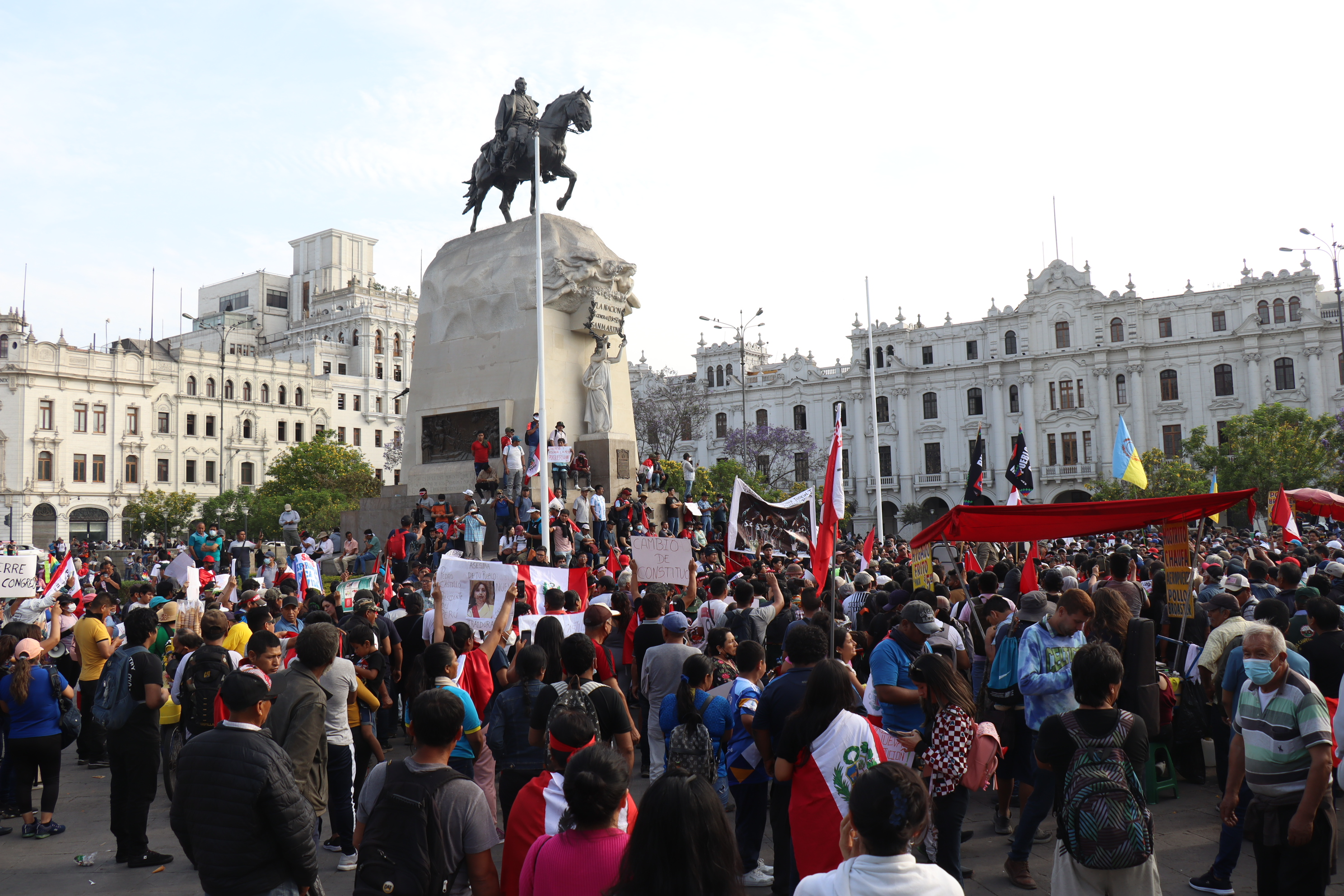
Demonstrations in Lima during the 2022–2023 Peruvian political protests

On 28 July 2021, Castillo was sworn in as the new president of Peru after a narrow win in a tightly contested run-off election. That same year, Peru celebrated the bicentenary of independence. From the beginning of his presidency, Castillo was targeted by the right-wing Congress, whom made it clear that they wanted to remove him from office by impeachment and attempted to remove him multiple times. On 7 December 2022, just hours before Congress was set to begin a third impeachment effort, Castillo accused Congress of obstruction and of creating a "congressional dictatorship" to serve oligopolistic businesses, deciding to attempt dissolving the opposition-controlled legislature to an "exceptional emergency government." In response, Congress quickly held an emergency session on the same day, voting to remove Castillo from office and replace him with Vice President Dina Boluarte, who became the country's first female president. Castillo was arrested while dropping off his family at the Mexican embassy and was charged with the crime of rebellion.

The Boluarte government proved unpopular as she allied herself with the right-wing Congress and the military, betraying her constituents. This resentment led to the 2022–2023 Peruvian political protests, which sought the removal of Boluarte and Congress, immediate general elections and the writing of a new constitution. Authorities responded to the protests violently, with the Ayacucho massacre and Juliaca massacre occurring at this time, resulting with the most violence experienced in the nation in over two decades. The strong response by the political elite in Lima raised concerns that they sought to establish an authoritarian or civilian-military government. On 10 October 2025, Peru's congress removed President Dina Boluarte from office and Jose Jeri was sworn in as Peru's interim president. In February 2026, the Congress voted to remove interim president José Jerí from office. Following his ousting, José María Balcázar was elected as the new interim president to lead the country until the general elections scheduled for April 12, 2026.

In the first round of the 2026 general election, Keiko Fujimori and Roberto Sánchez advanced to the second round after ballot counting delays. In Peru's Congress, Fujimori's Popular Force emerged as the single-largest party in both chambers. The second round, held on 7 June, saw another tight contest, with Fujimori emerging as the victor after weeks of counting. On 28 July 2026, Keiko Fujimori was sworn in as Peru’s president. In September 2026, Peru joined the “Shield of the Americas”, a regional security alliance led by the United States.

== Geography ==
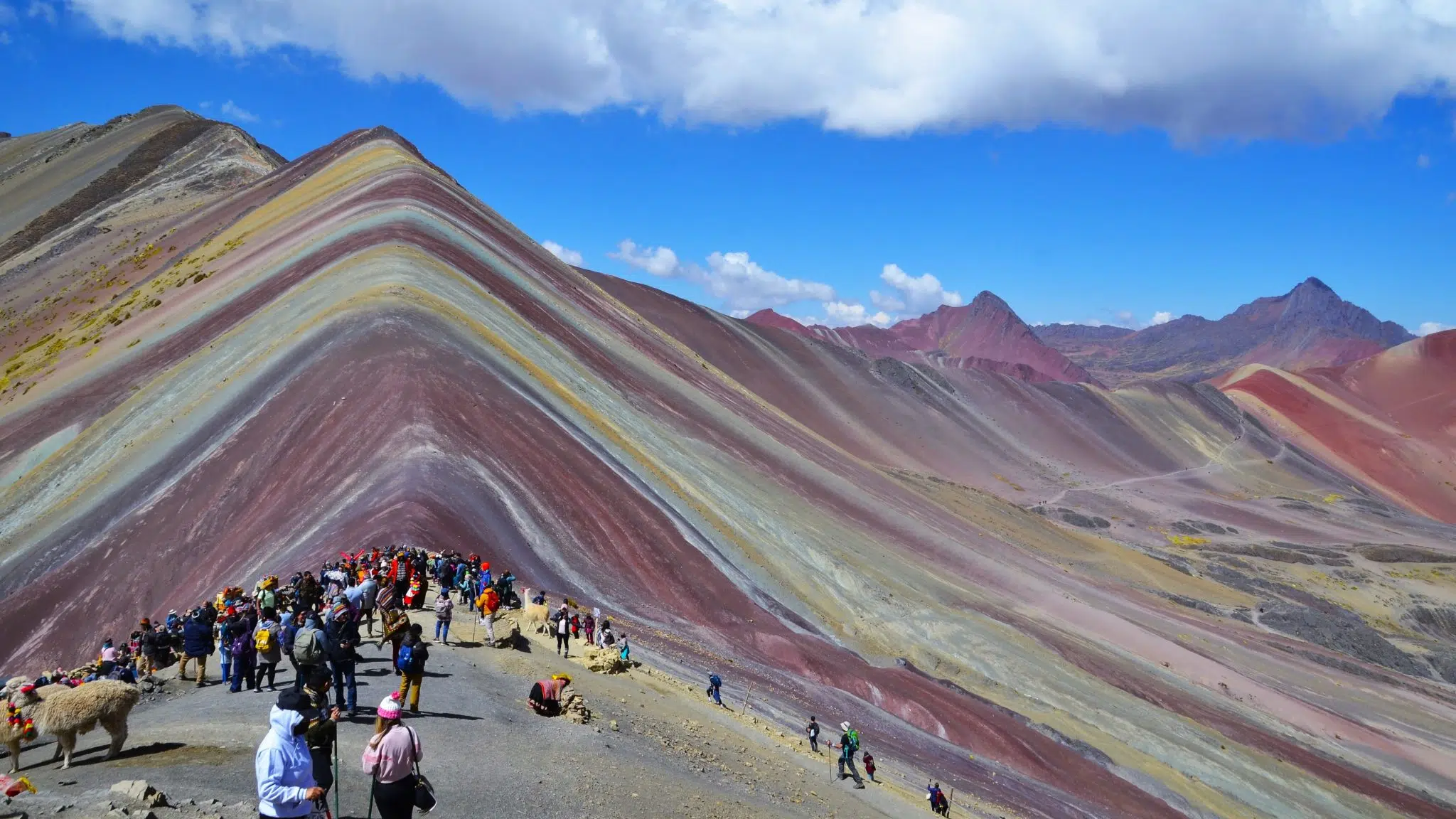
Vinicunca, also known as the Rainbow Mountain in Cuzco

Peru is located on the central western coast of South America facing the Pacific Ocean. It lies wholly in the Southern Hemisphere, its northernmost extreme reaching to 1.8 minutes of latitude or about 3.3 km (2.1 mi) south of the equator, covers 1,285,216 km^{2} (496,225 sq mi) of western South America. It borders Ecuador and Colombia to the north, Brazil to the east, Bolivia to the southeast, Chile to the south, and the Pacific Ocean to the west. The Andes run parallel to the Pacific Ocean; they define the three regions traditionally used to describe the country geographically.

The costa (coast), to the west, is a narrow, largely arid plain except for valleys created by seasonal rivers. The sierra (highlands) is the region of the Andes; it includes the Altiplano plateau as well as the highest peak of the country, the 6,768 m (22,205 ft) Huascarán. The third region is the selva (jungle), a wide expanse of flat terrain covered by the Amazon rainforest that extends east. Almost 60 percent of the country's area is located within this region. The country has fifty-four hydrographic basins, fifty-two of which are small coastal basins that discharge their waters into the Pacific Ocean. The final two are the endorheic basin of Lake Titicaca, and the Amazon basin, which empties into the Atlantic Ocean. Both are delimited by the Andes mountain range. The Amazon basin is particularly noteworthy as it is the source of the Amazon, which at 6,872 km (4,270 mi), is the longest river in the world, and covers 75% of Peruvian territory. Peru contains 4% of the planet's freshwater.

Most Peruvian rivers originate in the peaks of the Andes and drain into one of three basins. Those that drain toward the Pacific Ocean are steep and short, flowing only intermittently. Tributaries of the Amazon River have a much larger flow, and are longer and less steep once they exit the sierra. Rivers that drain into Lake Titicaca are generally short and have a large flow. Peru's longest rivers are the Ucayali, the Marañón, the Putumayo, the Yavarí, the Huallaga, the Urubamba, the Mantaro, and the Amazon.

The largest lake in Peru, Lake Titicaca between Peru and Bolivia high in the Andes, is also the largest of South America. The largest reservoirs, all in the coastal region of Peru, are the Poechos, Tinajones, San Lorenzo, and El Fraile reservoirs.

Peru also safeguards large portions of its territory through a system of national, regional and private protected natural areas, As of 2025 there are 258 protected natural areas covering roughly 21.97% of the country's land area and 7.89% of its marine area, administered under SERNANP.

=== Climate ===
Köppen–Geiger climate classification map for Peru

Although Peru is located entirely in the tropics, the combination of tropical latitude, mountain ranges, topography variations, and two ocean currents (Humboldt and El Niño) gives Peru a large diversity of climates. Elevations above sea level in the country range from −37 to 6,778 m (−121 to 22,238 ft) and precipitation ranges from less than 20 mm (0.79 in) annually in desert areas to more than 8,000 mm (310 in) in tropical rainforest areas.

Due to its geography, Peru can be divided into three main climates. The unbroken and relatively slim coastal region has moderate temperatures, low precipitation, and high humidity, except for its warmer, wetter northern reaches. In the mountain region, which covers almost a third of the country, rain is frequent in summer, and temperature and humidity diminish with altitude up to the frozen peaks of the Andes. The Peruvian Amazon, covering more than half of the total area of Peru, is characterized by heavy rainfall and high temperatures, except for its southernmost part, which has cold winters and seasonal rainfall.

=== Wildlife ===
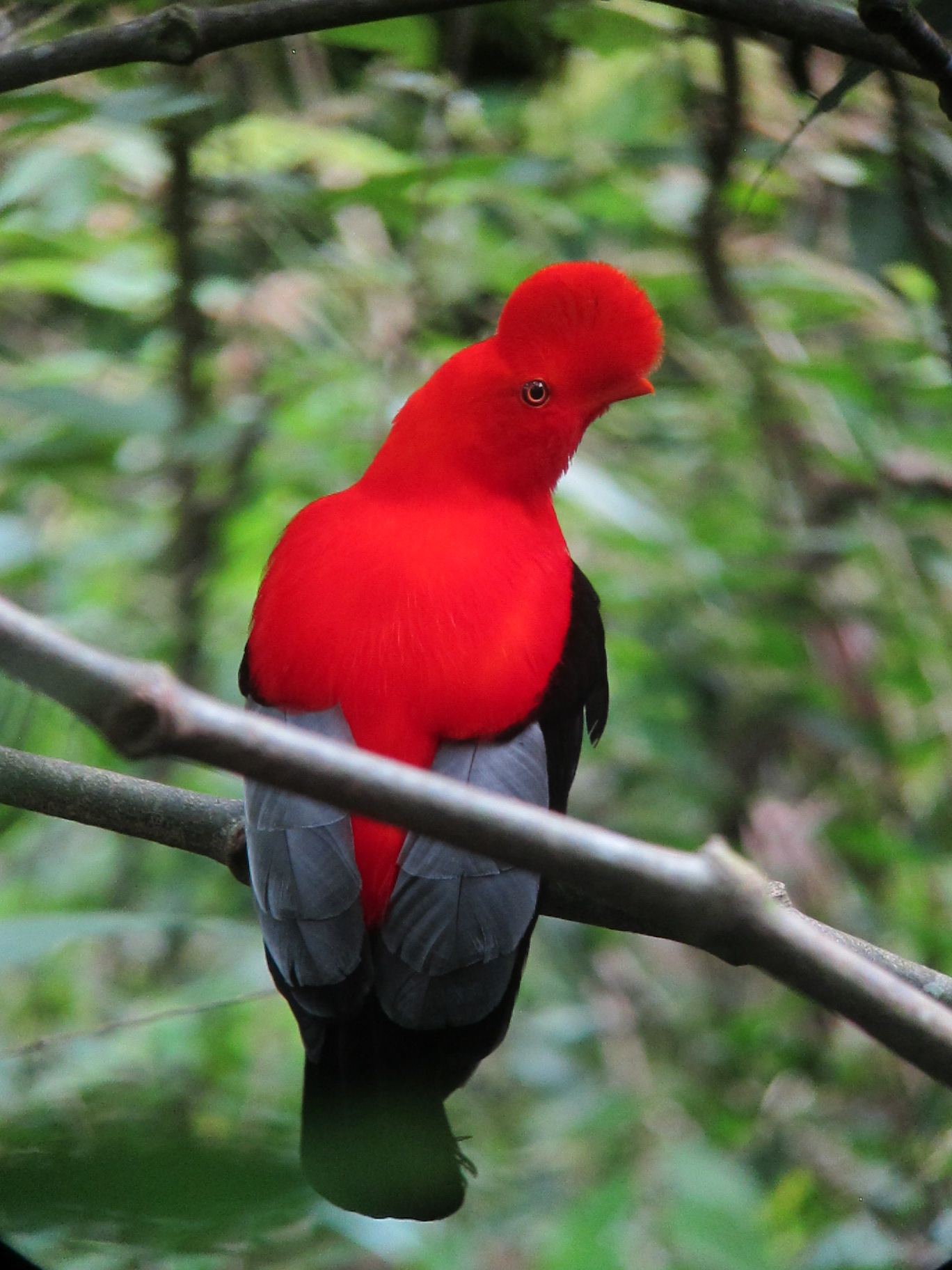
Andean cock-of-the-rock, Peru's national bird

Because of its varied geography and climate, Peru has a high biodiversity with 21,462 species of plants and animals reported as of 2003, 5,855 of them endemic, and is one of the megadiverse countries.

Peru has over 1,800 species of birds (120 endemic), over 500 species of mammals, over 300 species of reptiles, and over 1,000 species of freshwater fishes. The hundreds of mammals include rare species like the puma, jaguar and spectacled bear. The birds of Peru produce large amounts of guano, an economically important export. The Pacific holds large quantities of sea bass, flounder, anchovies, tuna, crustaceans, and shellfish, and is home to many sharks, sperm whales, and whales. The invertebrate fauna is far less inventoried; at least beetles (Coleoptera) have been surveyed in the "Beetles of Peru" project, led by Caroline S. Chaboo, University of Nebraska, USA and this revealved more than 12,000 documented and many new species for Peru.

Peru also has an equally diverse flora. The coastal deserts produce little more than cacti, apart from hilly fog oases and river valleys that contain unique plant life. The Highlands above the tree-line known as puna is home to bushes, cactus, drought-resistant plants such as ichu, and the largest species of bromeliad – the spectacular Puya raimondii.

The cloud-forest slopes of the Andes sustain moss, orchids, and bromeliads, and the Amazon rainforest is known for its variety of trees and canopy plants. Peru had a 2019 Forest Landscape Integrity Index mean score of 8.86/10, ranking it 14th globally out of 172 countries.

== Government and politics ==
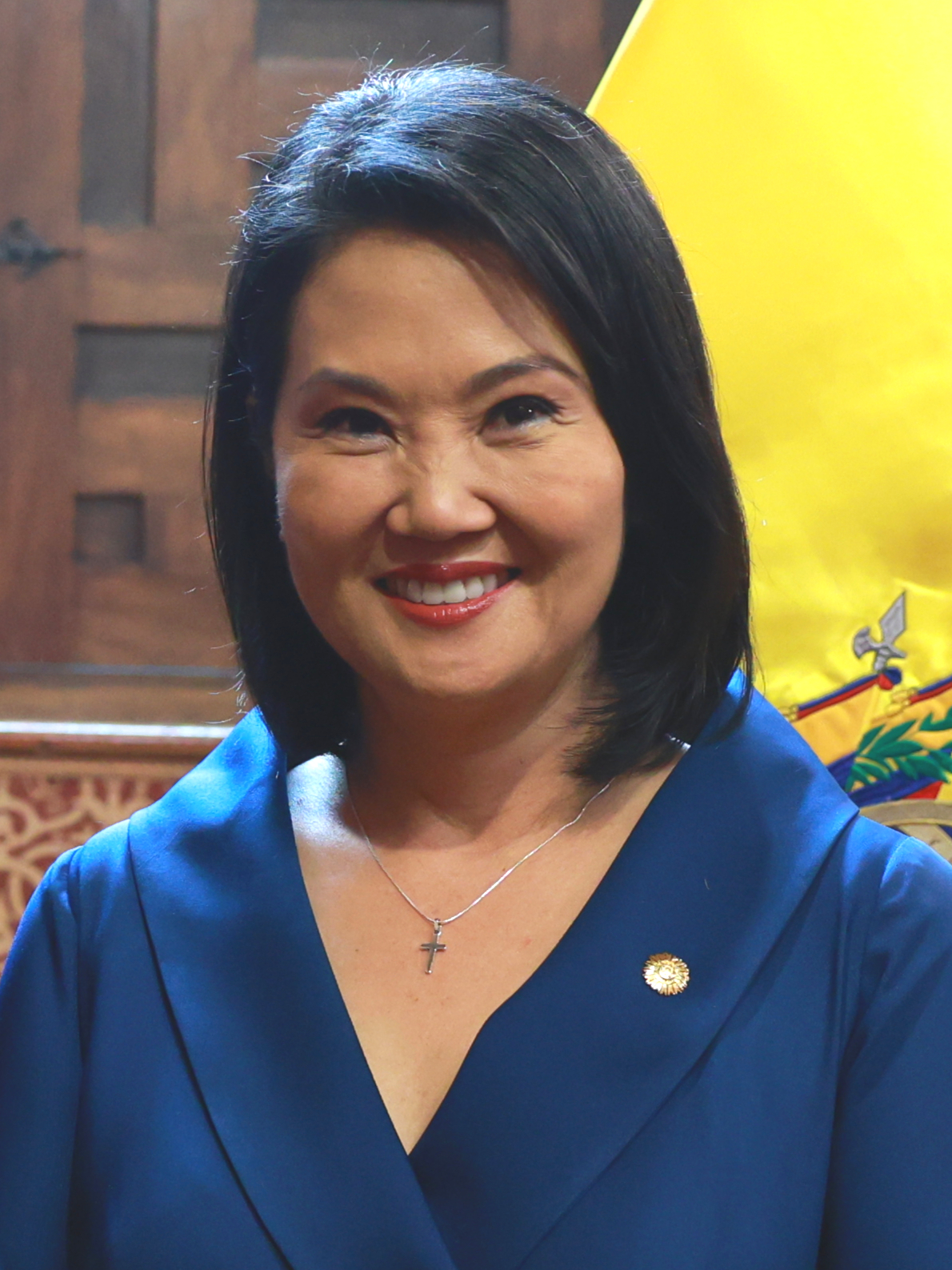
Keiko Fujimori
President

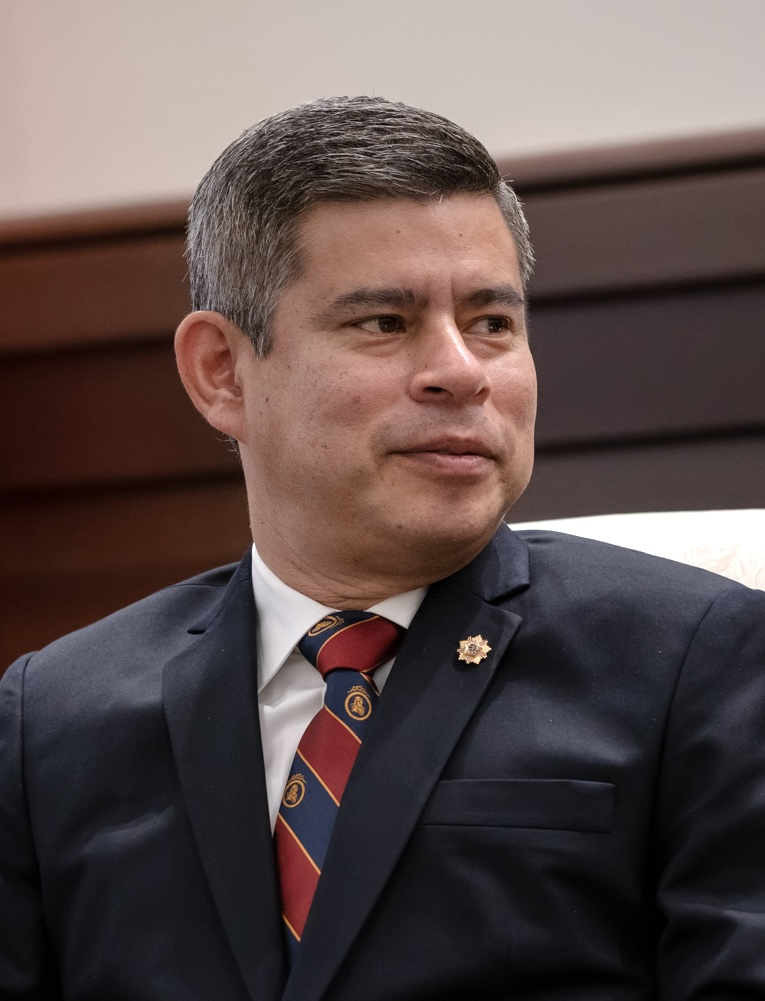
Luis Galarreta
Prime Minister

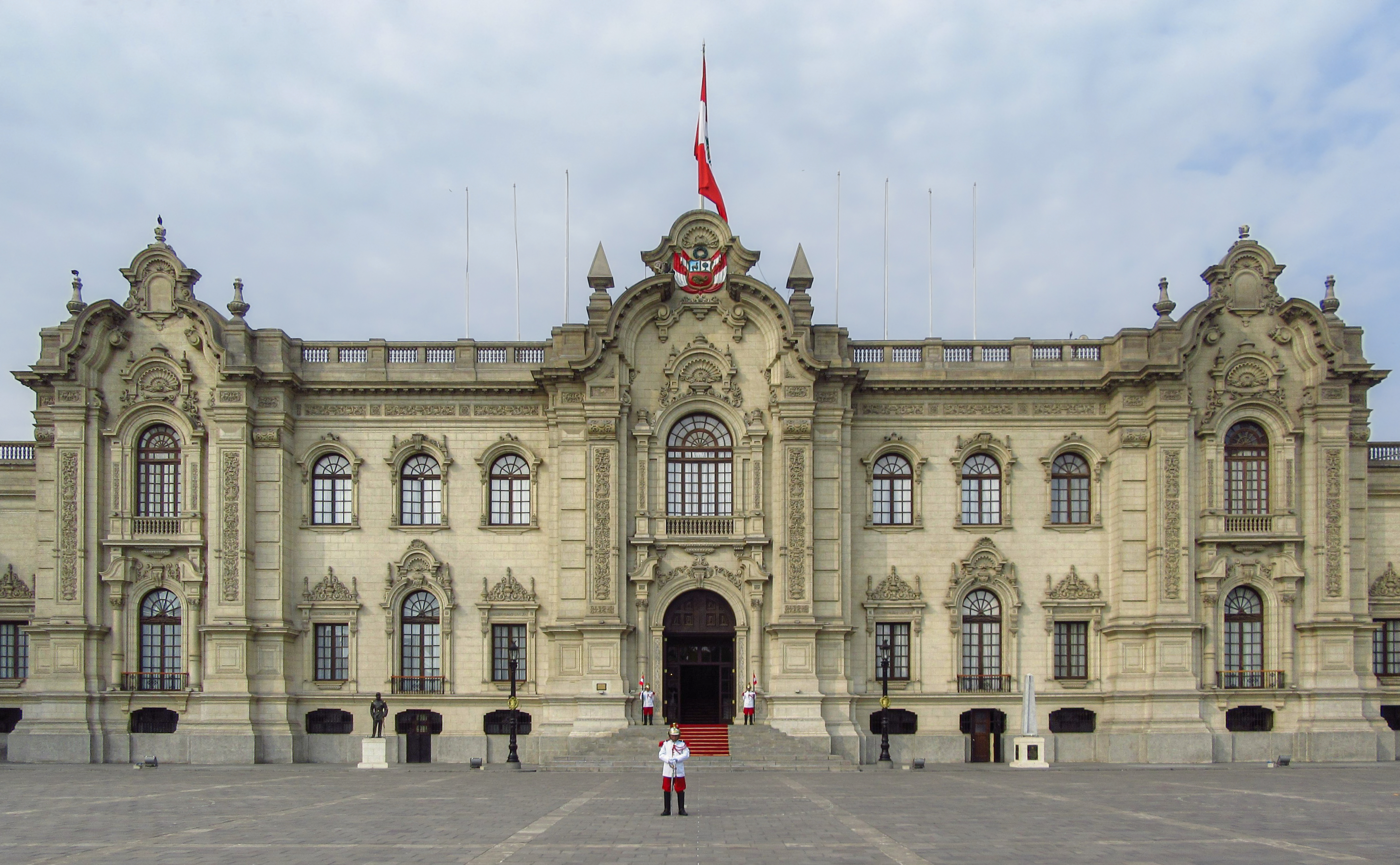
Palacio de Gobierno in Lima

Peru is a unitary semi-presidential republic with a multi-party system. The country has maintained a liberal democratic system under its 1993 constitution, which replaced a constitution that leaned the government to a federation to authorize more power to the president. It is also a unitary republic, in which the central government holds the most power and can create administrative divisions.

The Peruvian government is separated into three branches:

- Legislature: the bicameral Congress of Peru, consisting of a 130 member Chamber of Deputies (lower house) and a 60 member Senate (upper house);
- Executive: the president and the Council of Ministers, which in practice controls domestic legislation and serves as a Cabinet to the president, consisting of the prime minister and 18 ministers of the state;
- Judiciary: the Supreme Court of Peru, also known as the Royal Audencia of Lima, composed of 18 justices including a supreme justice, along with 28 superior courts, 195 trial courts, and 1,838 district courts.

Under its constitution, the president of Peru is both head of state and government and is elected to a five-year term without immediate reelection. The president appoints ministers who oversee the 18 ministries of the state, including the prime minister, into the Cabinet. The constitution designates minimal authority to the prime minister, who presides over cabinet meetings in which ministers advise the president and acts as a spokesperson on behalf of the executive branch. The president is also able to pose questions of confidence to the Congress of Peru, and consequently order the dissolution of congress, done in 1992 by Alberto Fujimori and in 2019 by Martín Vizcarra.

In the Chamber of Deputies, there are 130 members, from 25 administrative divisions, determined by respective population and elected to five-year terms. In the Senate, there are 60 members, elected from a national or regional electoral district. Bills are proposed by the executive and legislative powers and become law through a plurality vote in Congress. The judiciary is nominally independent, though political intervention into judicial matters has been common throughout history. The Congress of Peru can also pass a motion of no confidence, censure ministers, as well as initiate impeachments and convict executives. Due to broadly interpreted impeachment wording in the 1993 Constitution of Peru, the legislative branch can impeach the president without cause, effectively making the executive branch subject to Congress. In recent history, the legislative body has successfully removed multiple presidents; Alberto Fujimori resigned prior to removal in 2000, Pedro Pablo Kuczynski resigned in 2018, Martín Vizcarra was removed from office in 2020, Pedro Castillo was removed in 2022, Dina Boluarte was impeached and removed from office in 2025, and José Jerí was removed in 2026. Following a ruling in February 2023 by the Constitutional Court of Peru, whose members are elected by Congress, judicial oversight of the legislative body was also removed by the court, essentially giving Congress absolute control of Peru's government. In 2026, Congress returned to a bicameral legislature, replacing the previous unicameral body. The V-Dem Democracy Report described Peru undergoing legislative aggrandizement.

=== Elections ===
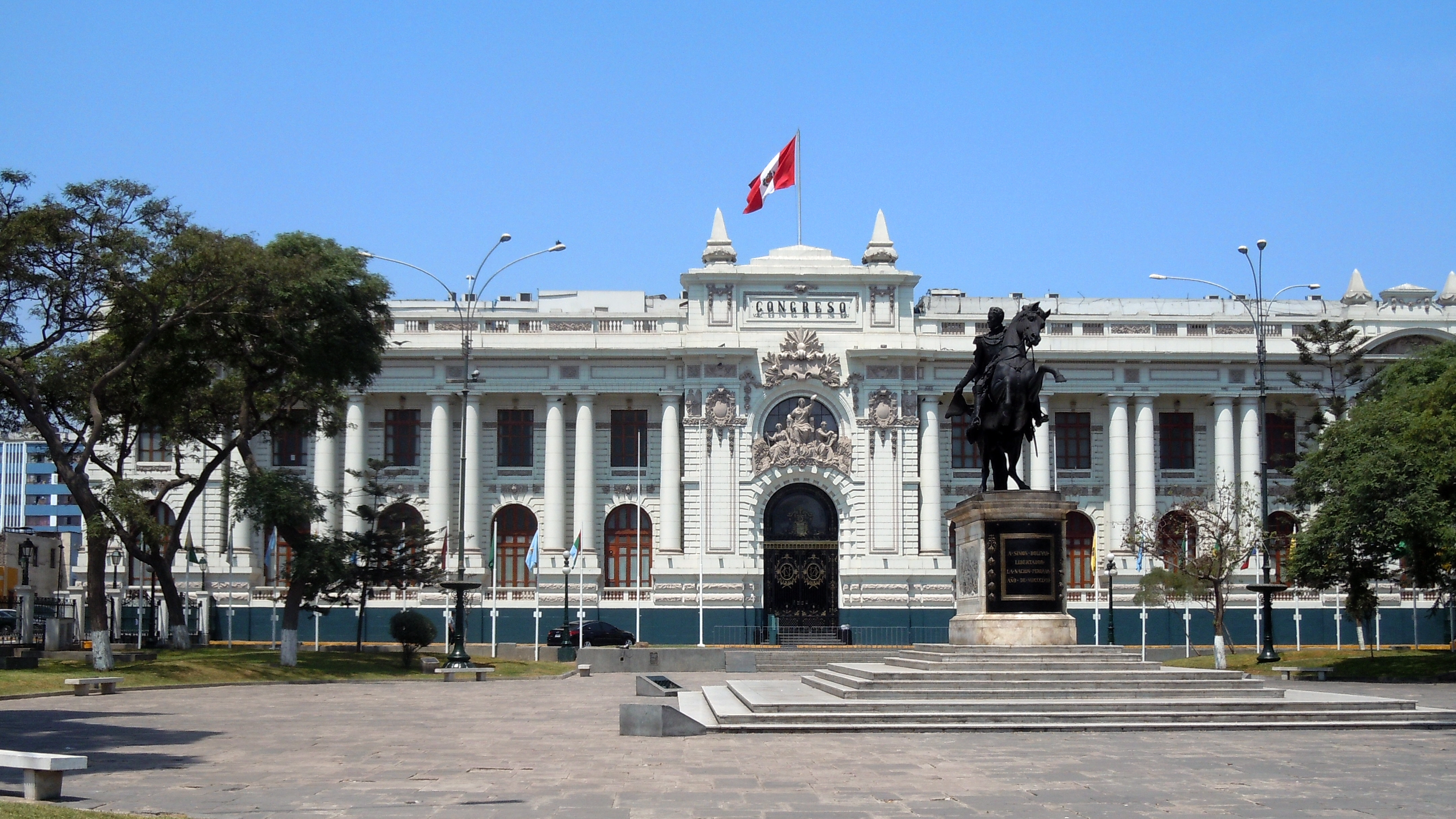
The Legislative Palace, seat of the Congress of Peru in Lima

Peru's electoral system uses compulsory voting for citizens from the age of 18 to 70, including dual-citizens and Peruvians abroad. Members of the Chamber of Deputies are directly elected by constituents in respective districts through proportional voting. Members of the Senate are elected from either national or regional electoral districts. The president is elected in a general election, along with the vice president, through a majority in a two-round system. Elections are observed and organized by the National Jury of Elections, National Office of Electoral Processes, and the National Registry of Identification and Civil Status.

Peru uses a multi-party system for congressional and general elections. Major groups that have formed governments, both on a federal and legislative level, are parties that have historically adopted economic liberalism, progressivism, right-wing populism (specifically Fujimorism), nationalism, and reformism. The last general election was the 2026 Peruvian general election.

=== Allegations of corruption in politics ===
Many Peruvian presidents have been removed from office or imprisoned on allegations of corruption from the 1990s into the 2020s. Alberto Fujimori was serving a 25-year prison sentence for commanding death squads that killed civilians in a counterinsurgency campaign during his tenure (1990–2000). He was later also found guilty of corruption. Former president Alan García (1985–1990 and 2006–2011) killed himself in April 2019 when Peruvian police arrived to arrest him over allegations he participated in the Odebrecht bribery scheme. Former president Alejandro Toledo is accused of allegedly receiving bribes from Brazilian construction firm Odebrecht during his government (2001–2006). Former president Ollanta Humala (2011–2016) is also under investigation for allegedly receiving bribes from Odebrecht during his presidential election campaign. Humala's successor Pedro Pablo Kuczynski (2016–2018) remains under house arrest while prosecutors investigate him for favoring contracts with Odebrecht. Former president Martín Vizcarra (2018–2020) was controversially ousted by Congress after media reports alleged he had received bribes while he was a regional governor years earlier.

Corruption is also widespread throughout Congress as legislators use their office for parliamentary immunity and other benefits, despite a large majority of Peruvians disapproving of Congress and its behavior.

=== Administrative divisions ===
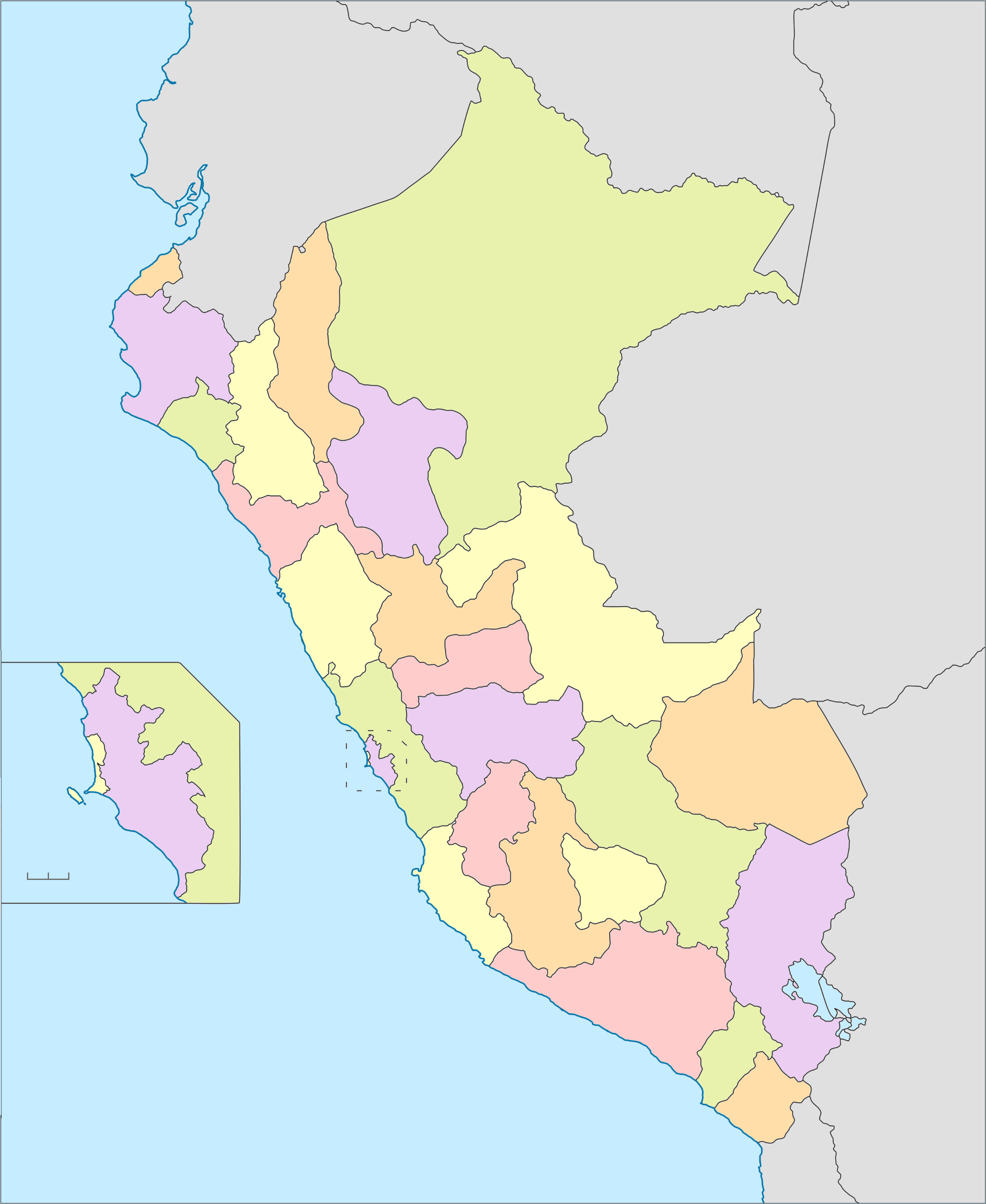
Clickable map of the regions of Peru

Peru is divided into 26 units: 24 departments, the Constitutional Province of Callao and the Province of Lima (LIM) – which is independent of any region and serves as the country's capital. Under the constitution, the 24 departments plus Callao Province have an elected "regional" (Note: The government in each department is referred to as "regional" governments despite being departments.) government composed of the regional governor and the regional council.

The governor constitutes the executive body, proposes budgets, and creates decrees, resolutions, and regional programs. The Regional Council, the region's legislative body, debates and votes on budgets, supervises regional officials, and can vote to remove the governor, deputy governor, or any member of the council from office. The regional governor and the Regional Council serve a term of four years, without immediate reelection. These governments plan regional development, execute public investment projects, promote economic activities, and manage public property.

Provinces such as Lima are administered by a municipal council, headed by a mayor. The goal of devolving power to regional and municipal governments was among others to improve popular participation. NGOs played an important role in the decentralization process and still influence local politics.

Some areas of Peru are defined as metropolitan areas which overlap district areas. The largest of them, the Lima metropolitan area, is the seventh-largest metropolis in the Americas.

=== Foreign relations ===
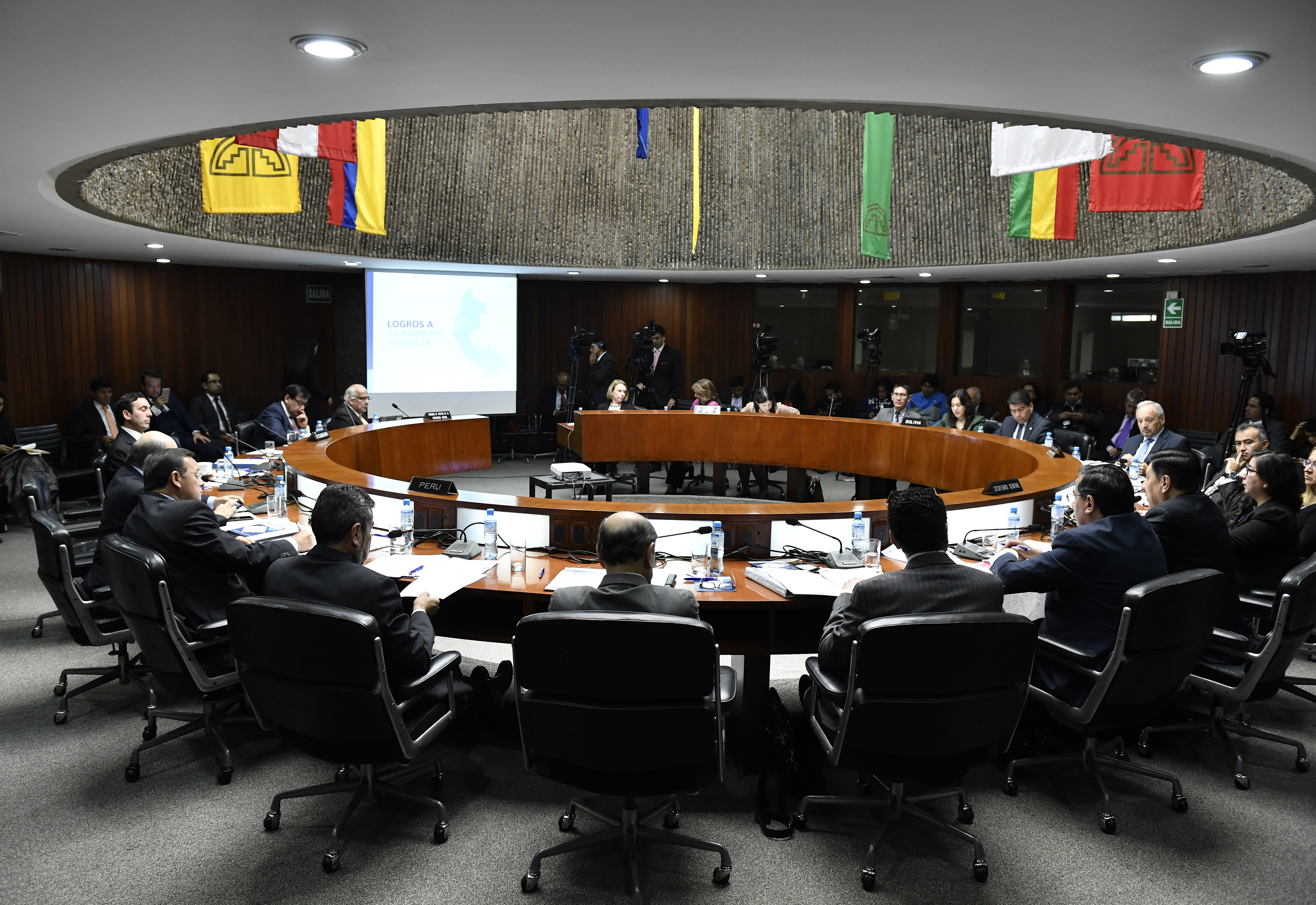
The headquarters of the Andean Community is located in Lima.

Over recent decades, Peru's foreign relations has historically been dominated by close ties with the United States and Asia, particularly through the Asia-Pacific Economic Cooperation (APEC), the World Trade Organization, the Pacific Alliance, Mercosur, and the Organization of American States (OAS). Peru is an active member of several regional trade blocs and is one of the founding members of the Andean Community of Nations. It is also a member of international organizations such as the OAS and the United Nations. Javier Pérez de Cuéllar, a celebrated Peruvian diplomat, served as United Nations Secretary General from 1981 to 1991.

Peru planned to be fully integrated into the Organization for Economic Co-operation and Development (OECD) by 2021, attributing its economic success and efforts to strengthen institutions as meeting factors to be a part of the OECD. Peru is a member of the World Trade Organization, and has pursued multiple major free trade agreements, most recently the Peru–United States Free Trade Agreement, the China–Peru Free Trade Agreement, the European Union Free Trade Agreement, free trade agreements with Japan, and many others.

Peru maintains an integrated relationship with other South American nations, and is a member of various South American intergovernmental agreements, more recently the Organization of American States, Mercosur, the Andean Community of Nations, the Pacific Alliance, and the APEC. Peru has historically experienced stressed relations with Chile, including the Peru v Chile international court resolution and the Chilean-Peruvian maritime dispute, but the two countries have agreed to work in improving relations.

Peru has participated in taking a leading role in addressing the crisis in Venezuela through the establishment of the Lima Group.

Peru is the 99th most peaceful country in the world, according to the 2024 Global Peace Index.

=== Military ===
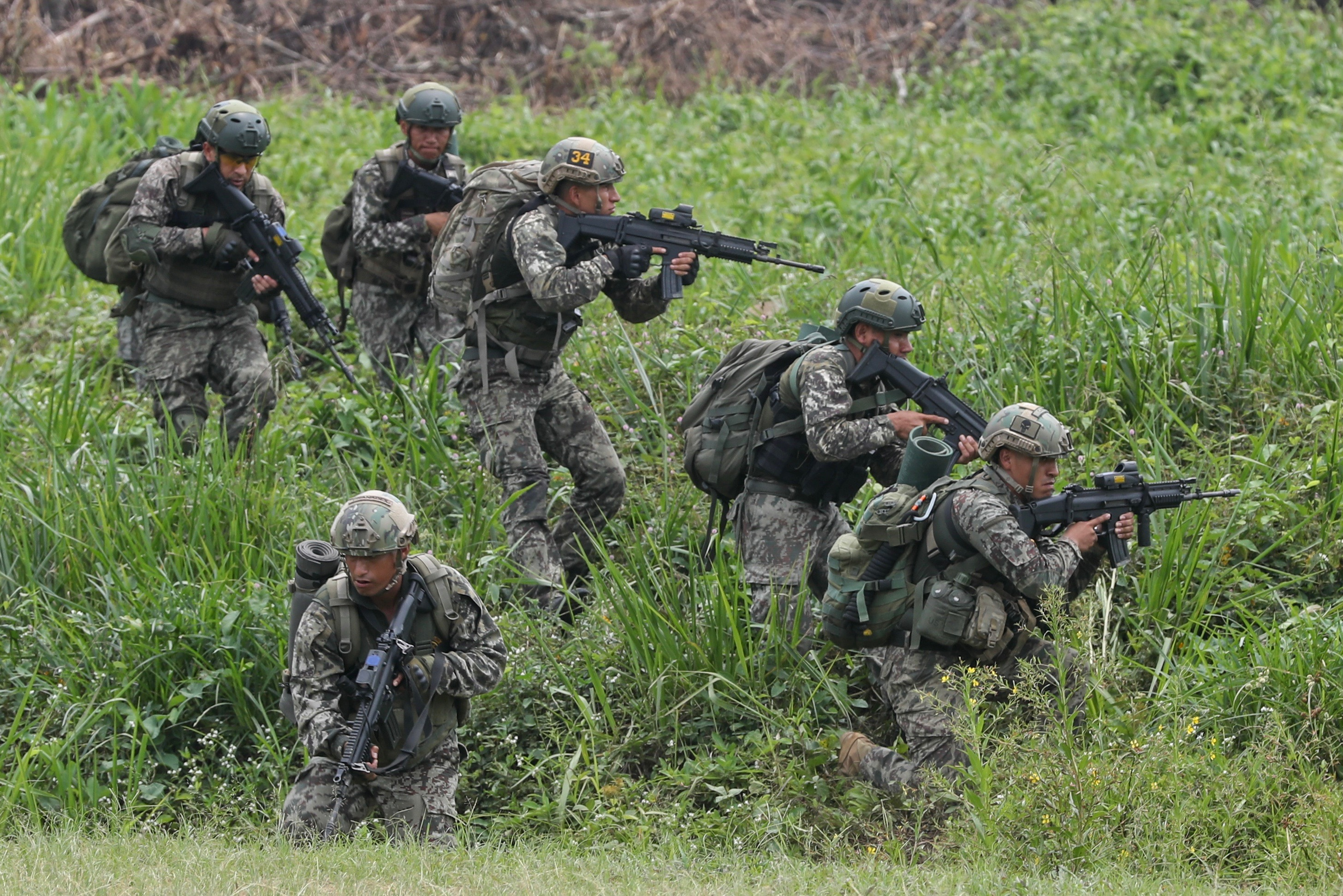
Peruvian marines in the VRAEM in 2019

Peru has the fourth largest military in Latin America. Peru's armed forces – the Armed Forces of Peru – comprise the Peruvian Navy (MGP), the Peruvian Army (EP), and the Peruvian Air Force (FAP), in total numbering 392,660 personnel (including 120,660 regulars and 272,000 reservists) as of 2020. Their primary mission is to safeguard the independence, sovereignty and territorial integrity of the country.

Their functions are separated by branch:

- The Peruvian Army is made up of the Chief of Staff, two Control Bodies, two Support Bodies, five Military Regions and six Command Rooms.
- The Peruvian Air Force was officially created on 20 May 1929, with the name of Peruvian Aviation Corps. Its main function is to serve as the country's air defense. It also participates in social support campaigns for hard-to-reach populations, organizes air bridges during disasters, and participates in international peace missions. Its four major air bases are located in the cities of Piura, Callao, Arequipa and Iquitos.
- The Peruvian Navy is in charge of the country's maritime, river, and lake defense. It is made up of 26,000 sailors. Personnel are divided into three levels: superior personnel, junior personnel and seafarers.

The military is governed by both the commander in chief, Ministry of Defense, and Joint Command of the Armed Forces (CCFFAA). The CCFFAA has subordinates to the Operational Commands and Special Commands, with which it carries out the military operations that are required for the defense and the fulfillment of the tasks that the executive power provides. Conscription was abolished in 1999 and replaced by voluntary military service. The National Police of Peru is often classified as a part of the armed forces. However, it has a distinct organizational structure and a purely civilian mandate. Its training and operations, particularly over the past two decades as an anti-terrorist unit, have imbued it with distinctly military traits, leading to its portrayal as a de facto fourth military branch with substantial land, sea, and air capabilities, and a work force of around 140,000 individuals.The Peruvian armed forces report through the Ministry of Defense, while the National Police of Peru reports through the Ministry of Interior.

Since the end of the crisis in Peru in 2000, the federal government has significantly reduced annual spending in defense. In the 2016–2017 budget, defense spending has constituted 1.1% of GDP ($2.3 billion), the second lowest spending relative to GDP in South America following Argentina. More recently, the Armed Forces of Peru have been used in civil defense. In 2020, Peru used its military personnel and even reservists to enforce the strict quarantine measures placed during the COVID-19 pandemic.

== Economy ==
Peru's economy is the 46th largest in the world (ranked by Purchasing Power Parity (PPP)). The World Bank classifies its income level as upper middle. Peru was, as of 2011, one of the world's fastest-growing economies owing to an economic boom experienced since the 2000s. However, by 2026, following the conclusion of the commodity boom in 2014, Peru experienced a substantial deceleration in its per capita GDP growth. It has an above-average Human Development Index (HDI) of 0.794 (as of 2023), which has been steadily improving over the years. Historically, the country's economic performance has been tied to exports, which provide hard currency to finance imports and external debt payments. Although they have provided substantial revenue, self-sustained growth and a more egalitarian distribution of income have proven elusive. According to 2025 data from the INEI, 25.7% of Peru's total population lives in poverty, including 4.7% who live in extreme poverty. Driven primarily by rising transportation and fuel costs, annual inflation climbed from 2.21 percent in February 2026 to 3.91 percent by May. Consequently, projections place the full-year inflation rate for 2026 at 3.8 percent. In mid-2026, Peru's national unemployment rate declined to 4.7 percent.

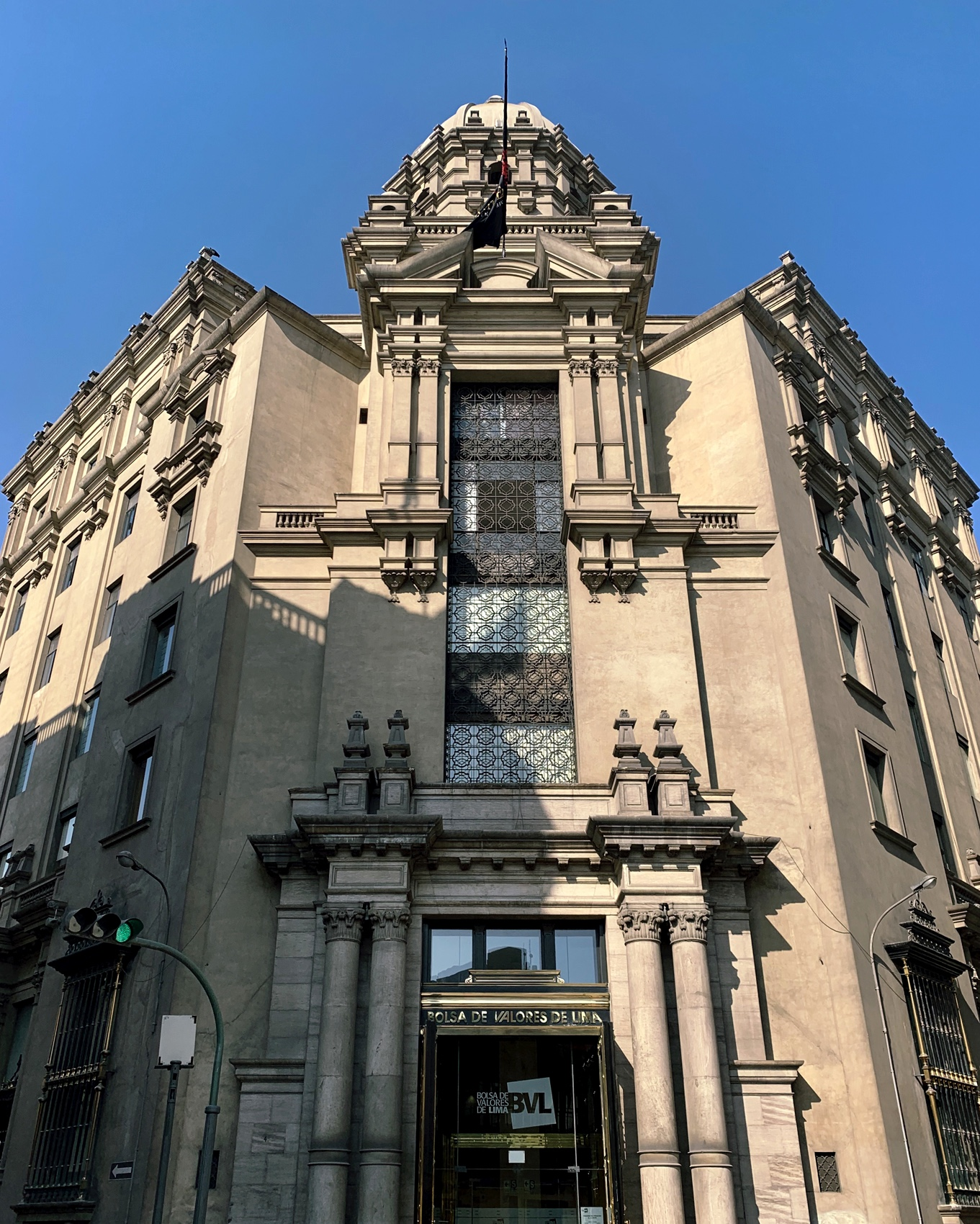
Lima Stock Exchange Building

Peruvian economic policy has varied widely since the 20th century. The 1968–1975 government of Juan Velasco Alvarado introduced radical reforms, which included agrarian reform, the expropriation of foreign companies, the introduction of an economic planning system, and the creation of a large state-owned sector. These measures failed to achieve their objectives of income redistribution and the end of economic dependence on developed nations. Despite these results, most reforms were not reversed until the 1990s, when the liberalizing government of Alberto Fujimori ended price controls, protectionism, restrictions on foreign direct investment, and most state ownership of companies.

The service sector accounts for the largest share of Peru's gross domestic product at approximately 51.3 percent, followed by the industrial sector—including dynamic mining and manufacturing activities—at 34.0 percent, and agriculture contributing 7.3 percent. Recent economic growth has been fueled by macroeconomic stability, improved terms of trade, and rising investment and consumption. Peru's main exports were copper, gold, zinc, textiles, and fish meal; its major trade partners were the United States, China, Brazil, and Chile. Informal workers represented, in 2019, 70% of the labour market according to the INEI. In 2016, almost three million children and adolescents worked in the informal sector.

=== Mining ===
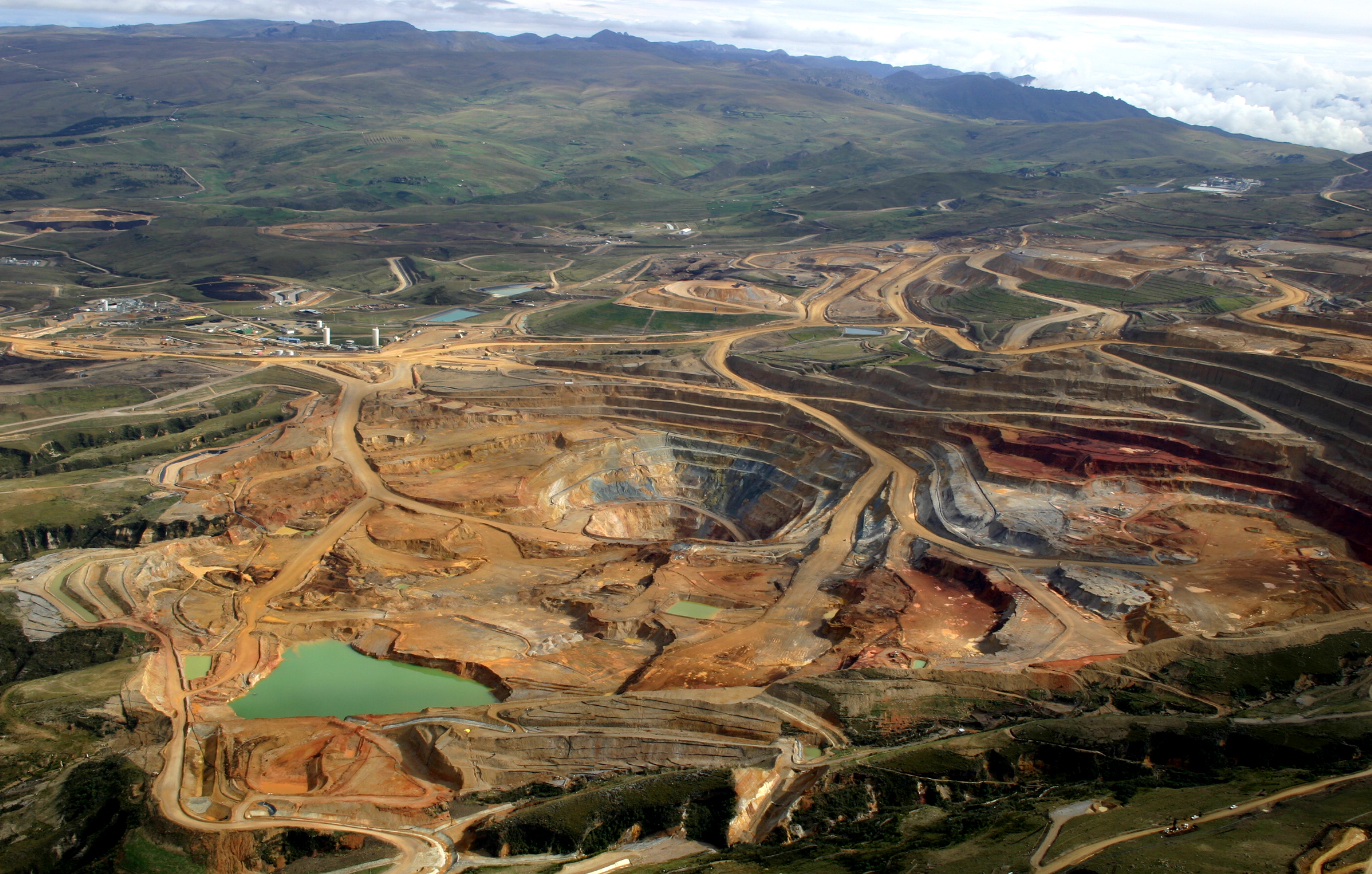
Yanacocha Mine

Peru is heavily dependent on mining for the export of raw materials, which represented 61.3% of exports in 2023. In 2019, the country was the world's second largest producer of copper and zinc, eighth largest producer of gold, third largest producer of lead, the fourth largest producer of tin, the fifth largest producer of boron, and the fourth largest producer of molybdenum and in 2023, it was the third largest producer of silver globally.

The Yanacocha mine in Cajamarca is the main source of gold extraction in Peru. It is considered the largest gold mine in South America and the second largest in the world. In 2005, 3,333,088 ounces (94,491,500 g) of gold were produced. An indicator of mining growth can be seen in mining exports, having grown from US$1,447 million in 1990 to US$39,639 million in 2023.

Peru has also devoted a significant portion of its land to oil extraction. The country has a expectant competitive position in global mining, maintaining mining leadership in Latin America and a solid mining history and trajectory little industrialized.

Oil was discovered in the Peruvian Amazon and northern coast in the early 20th century. The first significant oilfield was in the Piura region in Negritos, and was managed by the International Petroleum Company, a branch of Standard Oil of New Jersey; the second major oil producer was Lobitos Oil Co., located in Lobitos. From 1918 to 1920 Peru was one of the top producers of oil in South America. In 1968 the government nationalized the petroleum industry and renamed it Petroperú—petroleum was now controlled by the state. Peru devoted its resources to expanding its export sector, and by the 1980s almost a quarter of Peru's exports was oil.

The state has built a reliance on the oil industry for its income, and in turn has disregarded the environmental and societal impacts of extraction. Studies have shown that water resources near oil refineries have been contaminated with toxic metals and petroleum hydrocarbons, and Peru has multiple cases of oil spills which have polluted the surface water. Peru relies on groundwater and rivers for its water, yet the local communities have been forced to drink the contaminated water due to a lack of oil clean up.

=== Agriculture ===
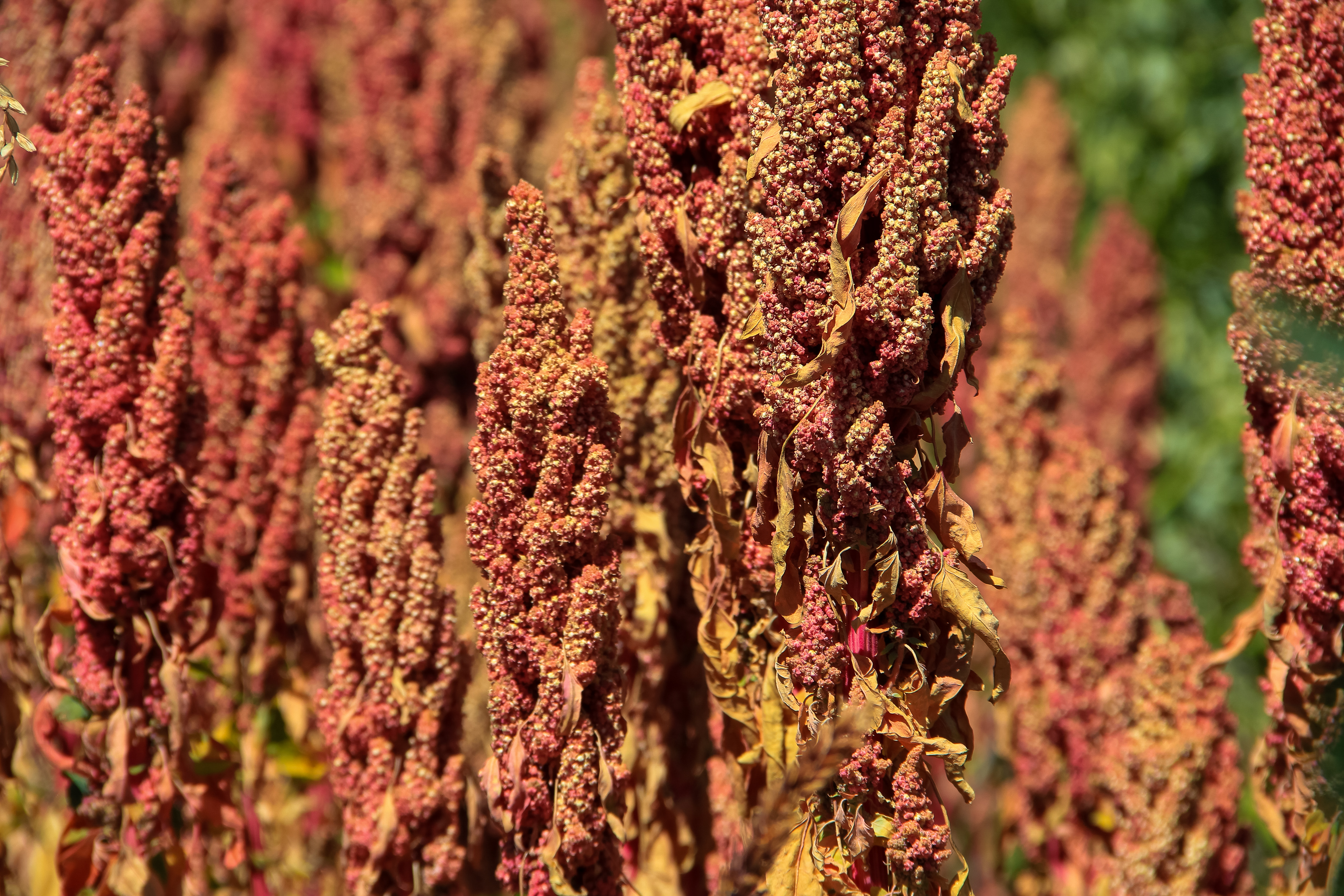
Quinoa

Peru is the world's largest producer of quinoa and maca, one of the 5 largest producers of avocado, blueberry, artichoke and asparagus, one of the 10 largest producers in the world of coffee and cocoa, and one of the 15 largest producers in the world of potato and pineapple, also having a considerable production of grape, sugarcane, rice, banana, maize and cassava; its agriculture is considerably diversified. In livestock, Peru is one of the 20 largest producers of chicken meat in the world.

According to a report by the UN Food and Agriculture Organization (FAO) published in August 2022, half of Peru's population is moderately food insecure (16.6 million people), and more than 20% (6.8 million people), are severely food insecure: they go without food for a whole day, or even several days.

The director of FAO Peru stresses that "this is the great paradox of a country that has enough food for its population. Peru is a net producer of food and one of the major agro-exporting powers in the region. Food insecurity is due to high social inequality and low wages, with Peru's minimum wage being one of the lowest in South America and a large informal sector. According to the FAO, the small farmers themselves suffer from hunger. Poorly paid, they also suffer from the impacts of climate change and face the problem of drug trafficking on their land and mining activity that exhausts the soil."

=== Tourism ===
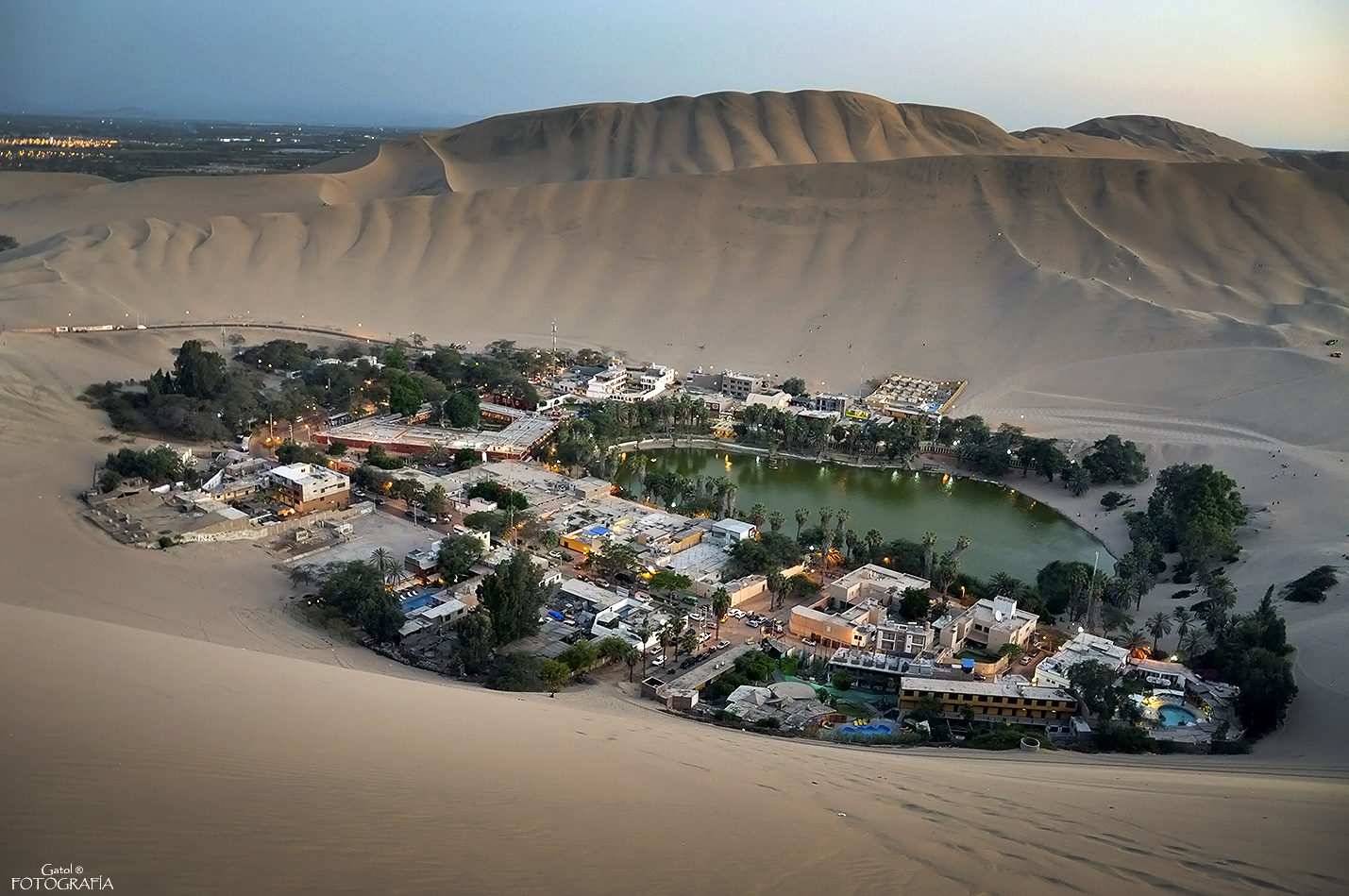
Huacachina, in Ica, the only natural oasis in South America

Tourism accounts for an estimated 3.7 percent of Peru's gross domestic product, approaching its pre-pandemic share of 3.9 percent. While annual international arrivals stand at approximately 4 million—compared to 4.5 million in 2019—sector revenues grew from $4.7 billion to $5.3 billion by the end of 2025. Tourism supports approximately 1.4 million jobs. Peru's diverse geography and heritage support a broad tourism sector, offering destinations and activities focused on culture, ecotourism, adventure sports, gastronomy, coastal recreation, and luxury travel.

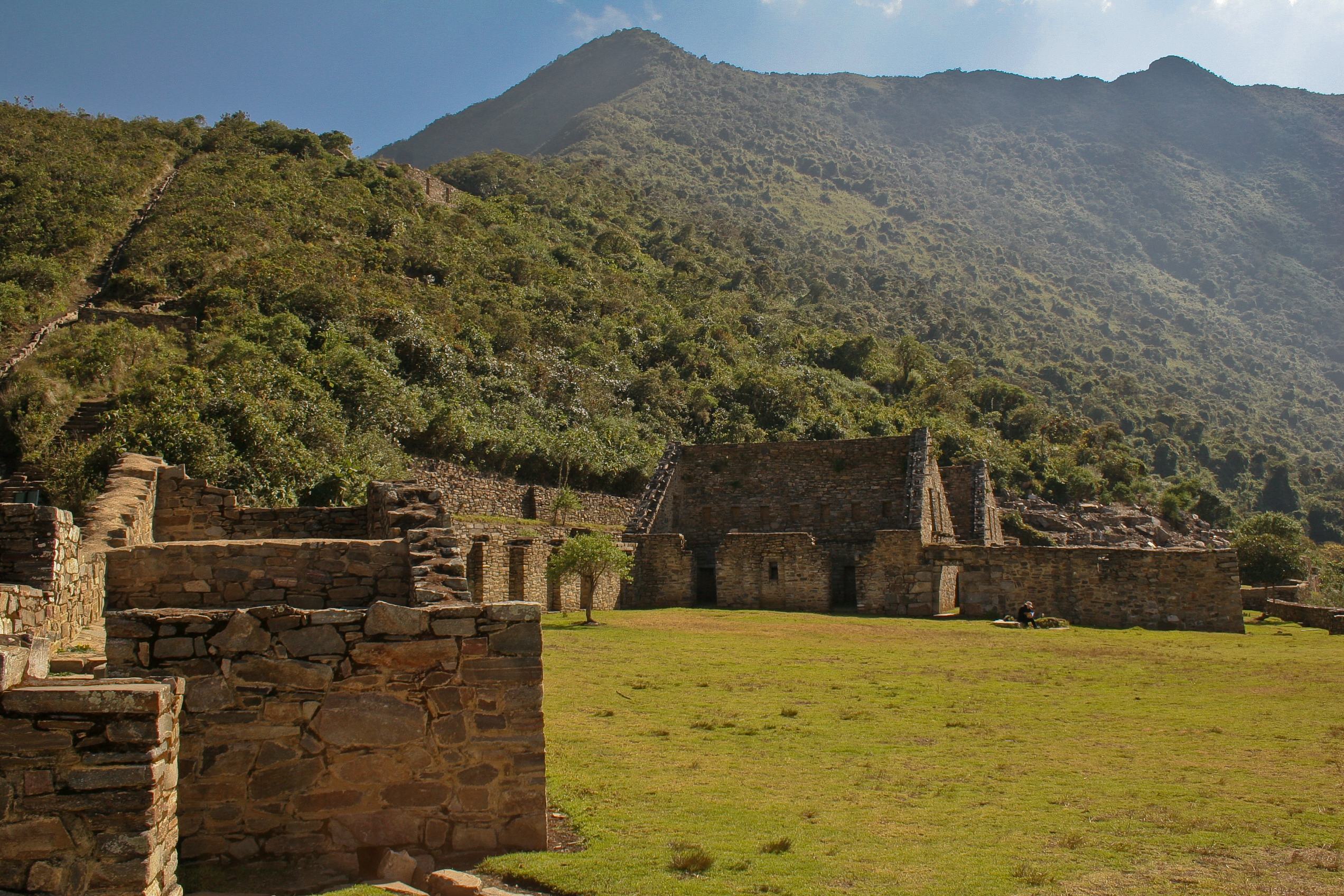
Choquequirao, Incan ruins in Cusco

The places most visited by tourists include Lima and its historic center, along with Cusco, which is characterized by its Inca and colonial architecture and its main attractions, the Sacred Valley of the Incas and Machu Picchu. Other notable locations in the Cusco region include Qorikancha, Ollantaytambo, and Písac. Arequipa is also a major tourist destination for its historic center and the Colca Canyon, as is Puno through Lake Titicaca. The country's primary tourism route is the southern circuit, which includes destinations such as Ica, Nazca, Pisco, Paracas, Ayacucho, and Puerto Maldonado, offering various architectural, cultural, and natural attractions. The second most important route is the Callejón de Huaylas, located in the Department of Áncash, which serves as a center for adventure tourism and a primary reference point for New Andean gastronomy. Peru features several other notable tourist routes. These include the Mantaro River valley, with the city of Huancayo as one of its axes, and the Tarma Valley, which serves as an entrance to the central jungle. In the north, the city of Trujillo is home to Chan Chan, the largest adobe citadel in the world, as well as the traditional seaside resort of Huanchaco and the Huacas del Sol y de la Luna of the Chimú culture. Chiclayo, Piura, and the rainforest city Iquitos are also popular destinations. Peru has 13 World Heritage Sites and 15 national parks.

=== Industry ===
The World Bank lists the top producing countries each year, based on the total value of production. According to the 2019 list, Peru has the 50th most valuable industry in the world ($28.7 billion). Peru was ranked 80th in the Global Innovation Index in 2025.

In 2011 and 2016 Peru was the world's largest supplier of fishmeal. It is also the world's leading producer of alpaca wool, and the most important exporter of cotton textile garments in Latin America, and due to its natural wealth, it is an excellent place for the development of the polymer industry worldwide. The country is in a stage of economic growth and it is expected, in light of the agreements and treaties signed in free trade areas, to become one of the most attractive South American nations for developing business.

=== Transport ===
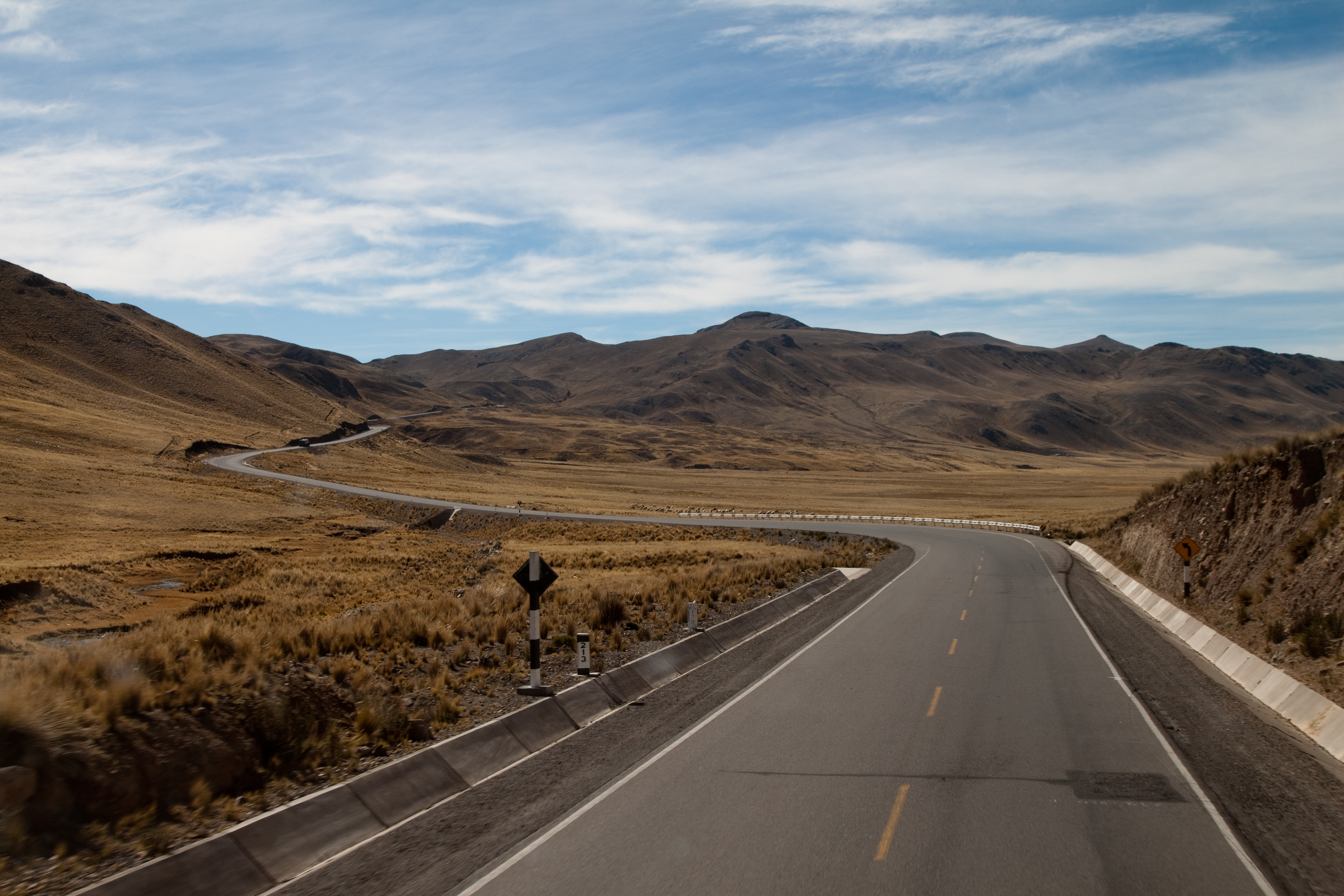
Highway in the Altiplano between Arequipa and Puno

Peru's road network in 2021 consisted of 175,589 km (109,106 mi) of highways, with 29,579 km (18,380 mi) paved. Some highways in the country that stand out are the Pan American Highway and Interoceanic Highway. In 2016, the country had 827 km (514 mi) of duplicated highways, and was investing in more duplications: the plan was to have 2,634 km (1,637 mi) in 2026. The country's rail network is small: in 2025, the country only had 2,001 km (1,243 mi) of railways.

Peru has important international airports such as Lima, Cuzco and Arequipa. The 10 busiest airports in South America in 2017 were São Paulo-Guarulhos (Brazil), Bogotá (Colombia), São Paulo-Congonhas (Brazil), Santiago (Chile), Lima (Peru), Brasília (Brazil), Rio de Janeiro (Brazil), Buenos Aires-Aeroparque (Argentina), Buenos Aires-Ezeiza (Argentina) and Minas Gerais (Brazil). Multiple airport expansions are currently under construction across Peru, the two main ones being the Jorge Chávez International Airport and Chinchero International Airport. Jorge Chávez International Airport, the largest in Peru, went through an expansion that includes the construction of a new runway, control tower and a new terminal, along with new hotels, logistical buildings and cargo sector. Altogether, they make up the Ciudad Aeropuerto, Airport City. It will allow transit of 40 million passengers every year and was completed in 2025. Another ambitious airport project is the Chinchero International Airport in Cusco. The new airport is set to replace the old Alejandro Velasco Astete International Airport and help passengers bypass a stop in Lima by introducing international routes.

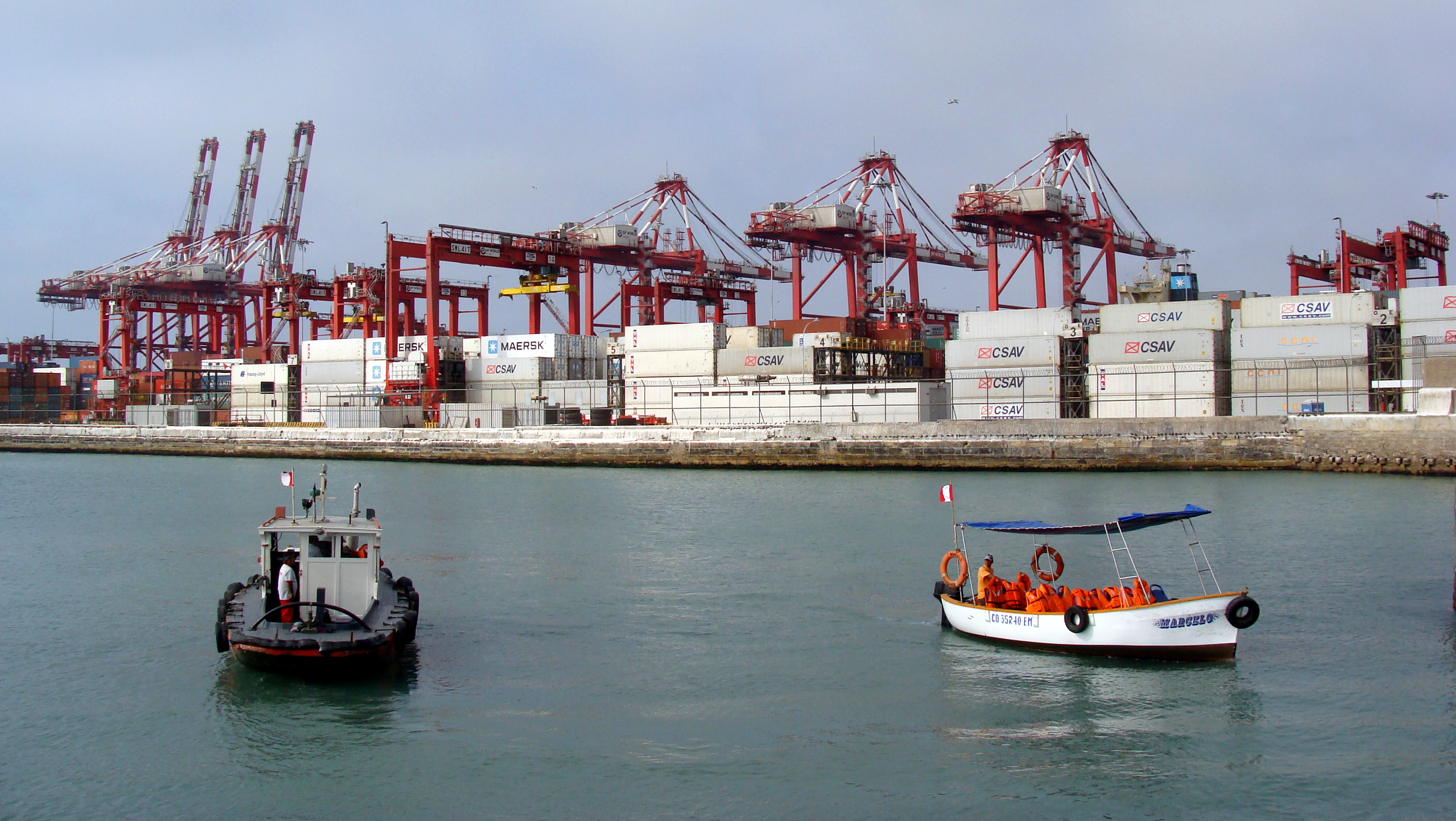
Port of Callao

Peru has important ports in Callao, Ilo and Matarani. The 15 most active ports in South America in 2018 were: Port of Santos (Brazil), Port of Bahia de Cartagena (Colombia), Callao (Peru), Guayaquil (Ecuador), Buenos Aires (Argentina), San Antonio (Chile), Buenaventura (Colombia), Itajaí (Brazil), Valparaíso (Chile), Montevideo (Uruguay), Paranaguá (Brazil), Rio Grande (Brazil), São Francisco do Sul (Brazil), Manaus (Brazil) and Coronel (Chile). The Port of Callao is currently the largest port in Peru, but will soon be overtaken by the Port of Chancay, a joint project between China and Peru in Chancay, north of Lima. When completed, the port will become the largest in Latin America. Officially inaugurated on 14 November 2024, the Port of Chancay is a key gateway for trade between South America and Asia, significantly reducing shipping time across the Pacific.

=== Energy ===
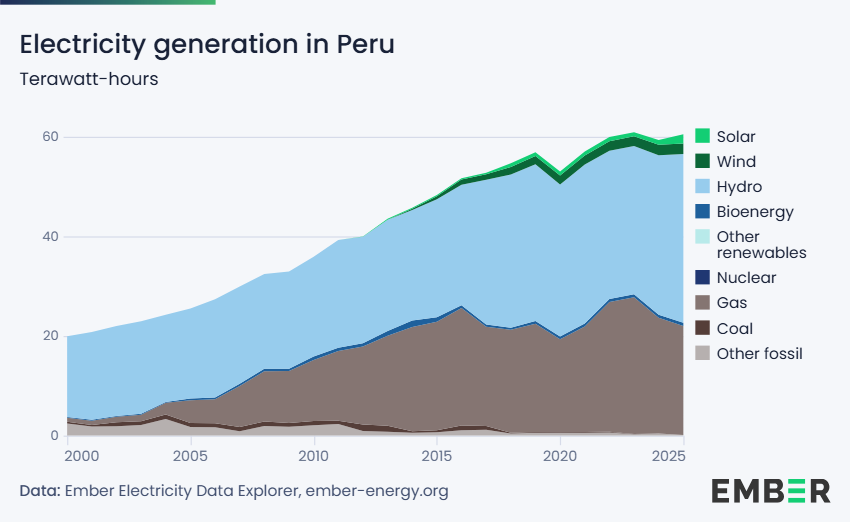
Electricity generation in Peru in terawatt-hours

The electricity sector has experienced notable improvements in recent years. The number of homes with electric lighting grew from 82% in 2007 to 94.2% in 2016, while the quality and effectiveness of service provision also improved. Current electricity generation capacity is evenly divided between thermal energy and hydroelectric energy sources. The National Interconnected Electrical System supplies 85% of the connected population, with several isolated systems that cover the rest of the country. Peruvian electricity production totalled 5.1 TWh in the month of October 2022. Of these, 52% came from hydroelectric plants, 38.3% from thermoelectric plants (which use oil, gas and coal) and 9.7% of renewable energy plants like: wind, solar, and others.

In 2021, Peru had, in terms of installed renewable electricity, 5,490 MW in hydropower (34th largest in the world), 409 MW in wind power (49th largest in the world), 336 MW in solar power (62nd largest in the world), and 185 MW in biomass.

== Demographics ==
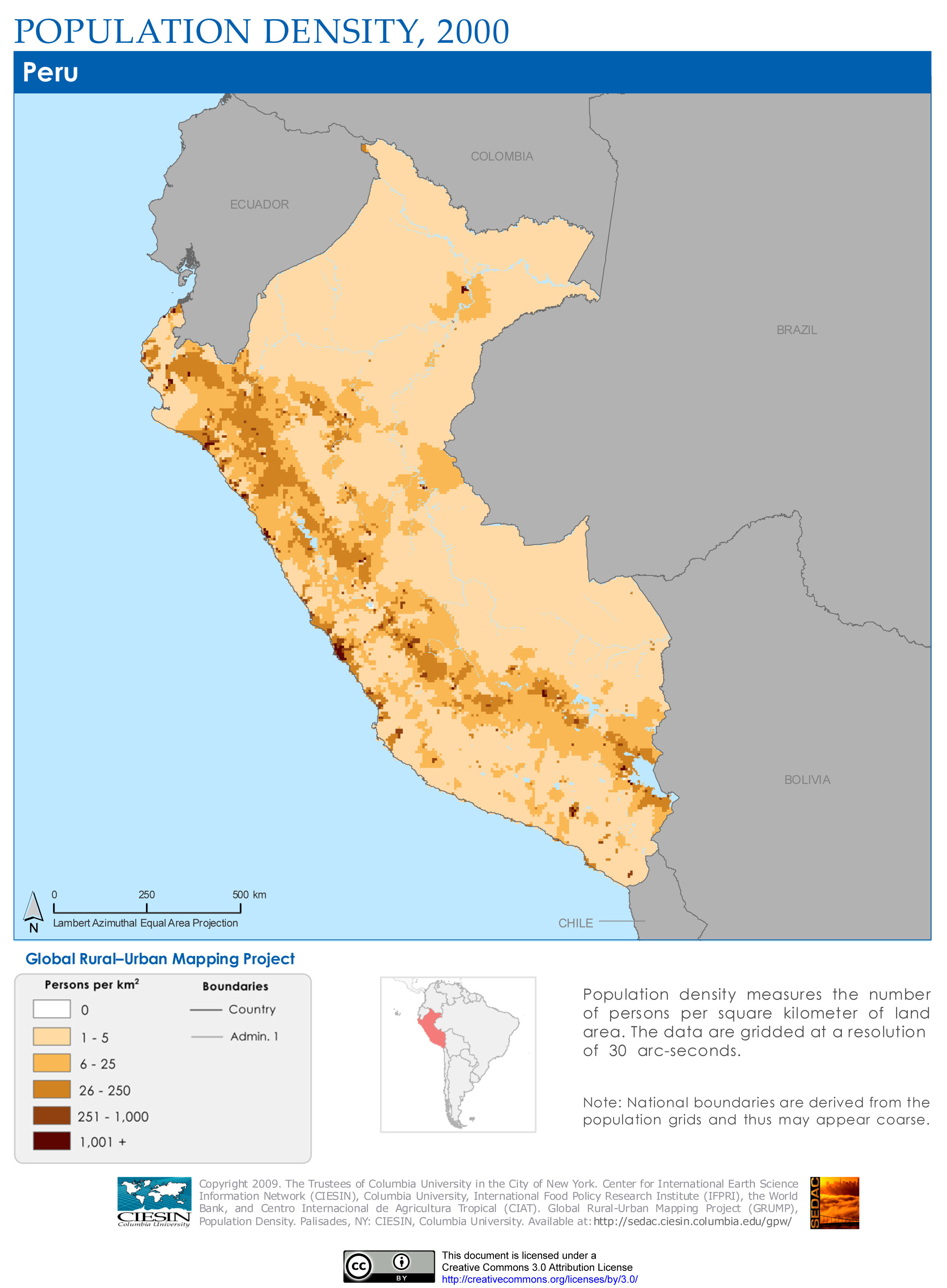
Population density, 2000

With a population of 33,396,698 inhabitants according to estimates and projections of the National Institute of Statistics and Informatics until the year 2022, Peru is the fourth most populous country in South America. Its population density is 25.79 inhabitants per square kilometre (66.8/sq mi) and its annual growth rate is 1.1%. 58.8% of the Peruvian population lives on the coast, 27% in the mountains, and 14.2% in the jungle. In 2020, 27 million Peruvians lived in urban areas, which represents 80% of the population. Peru had a population of seven million residents in 1940; between 1950 and 2000, the demographic growth rate of Peru declined from 2.6% to 1.6%, with the population being expected to reach approximately 42 million in 2050.

As of 2017, 79.3% lived in urban areas and 20.7% in rural areas. Major cities include the Lima metropolitan area (home to over 9.8 million people), Arequipa, Trujillo, Chiclayo, Piura, Iquitos, Cusco, Chimbote, and Huancayo; all reported more than 250,000 inhabitants in the 2007 census. Arequipa is Peru's second largest city, with an estimated population of 1,177,000, while Trujillo is the third largest city with 1,048,000. There are 15 known uncontacted Amerindian tribes in Peru. Peru has a life expectancy of 75.0 years (72.4 for males and 77.7 for females) according to the latest data for the year 2016 from the World Bank.

The economically active population is equivalent to 53.78% of the total population, or about 17,830,500 inhabitants. The largest cities are located on the coast, such as Sullana, Piura, Chiclayo, Trujillo, Chimbote, Lima and Ica. In the mountains, the cities of Arequipa, Cusco, Huancayo, Cajamarca and Juliaca stand out. Finally, in the jungle, Iquitos is the most important, followed by Pucallpa, Tarapoto, Moyobamba and Tingo María.

Largest cities or towns in Peru National Institute of Statistics and Informatics - INEI (Estimated 2025)
Rank	Name	Region	Pop.	Rank	Name	Region	Pop.
1	Lima	Lima	10,353,700 (Metro pop.)	11	Ica	Ica	369,500
2	Arequipa	Arequipa	1,195,200 (Metro pop.)	12	Juliaca	Puno	347,800
3	Trujillo	La Libertad	1,063,700 (Metro pop.)	13	Tacna	Tacna	332,400
4	Chiclayo	Lambayeque	618,600 (Metro pop.)	14	Ayacucho	Ayacucho	266,800
5	Piura	Piura	598,200	15	Cajamarca	Cajamarca	259,400
6	Huancayo	Junín	571,000	16	Huánuco	Huánuco	246,300
7	Cusco	Cusco	497,200	17	Chincha Alta	Ica	226,200
8	Iquitos	Loreto	461,500	18	Sullana	Piura	210,500
9	Pucallpa	Ucayali	437,600	19	Huacho	Lima	195,600
10	Chimbote	Ancash	413,800	20	Tarapoto	San Martín	182,300

=== Ethnic groups ===
Racial groups in Peru (2025 census)
1. Mestizos (61.8%)
2. Indigenous (20.7%)
3. Whites (8.95%)
4. Blacks (6.04%)
5. East Asians (0.14%)
6. Other groups (1.94%)
7. No answer (0.39%)

Peru is a multiethnic nation formed by successive waves of different peoples over five centuries. Amerindians inhabited Peruvian territory for several millennia before the Spanish conquest in the 16th century; according to historian Noble David Cook, their population decreased from nearly 5–9 million in the 1520s to around 600,000 in 1620 mainly because of infectious diseases.

The 2017 census for the first time included a question on ethnic self-identification. According to the results, 60.2% of the people identified themselves as mestizo, 22.3% identified themselves as Quechua, 5.9% identified themselves as white, 3.6% identified themselves as black, 2.4% identified themselves as Aymara, 2.3% identified themselves as other ethnic groups, and 3.3% did not declare their ethnicity. In the different stages of Peru's history, ethnic composition has varied, with a continuous decline in the Amerindian proportion, due to multiple socioeconomic and sociocultural factors, birth controls, high mortality rates, exclusion, among others. The country tends towards a slow generalized miscegenation of all ethnic segments that began from the beginning of the colonial period to the present day. Because the majority of the Peruvian population has become mestizo, some feel a superiority complex towards the natives of the mountains and the jungle, either because they do not pronounce a word properly, or simply because they do not know how to read a text well, leading to a kind of racism towards them.

During the Viceroyalty of Peru, Spaniards and Africans arrived in large numbers, mixing widely with each other and with the native population, mainly on the coast (the mountains and the jungle maintained a very little mixed indigenous majority). After independence there was European immigration from Spain, Italy, England, France, and Germany, along with the Middle East. Peru freed its black slaves in 1854. Chinese and Japanese arrived in the 1850s as laborers following the end of slavery, and have since become a major influence in Peruvian society. The first Croatian immigrants came to Peru in 1573 from Dubrovnik.

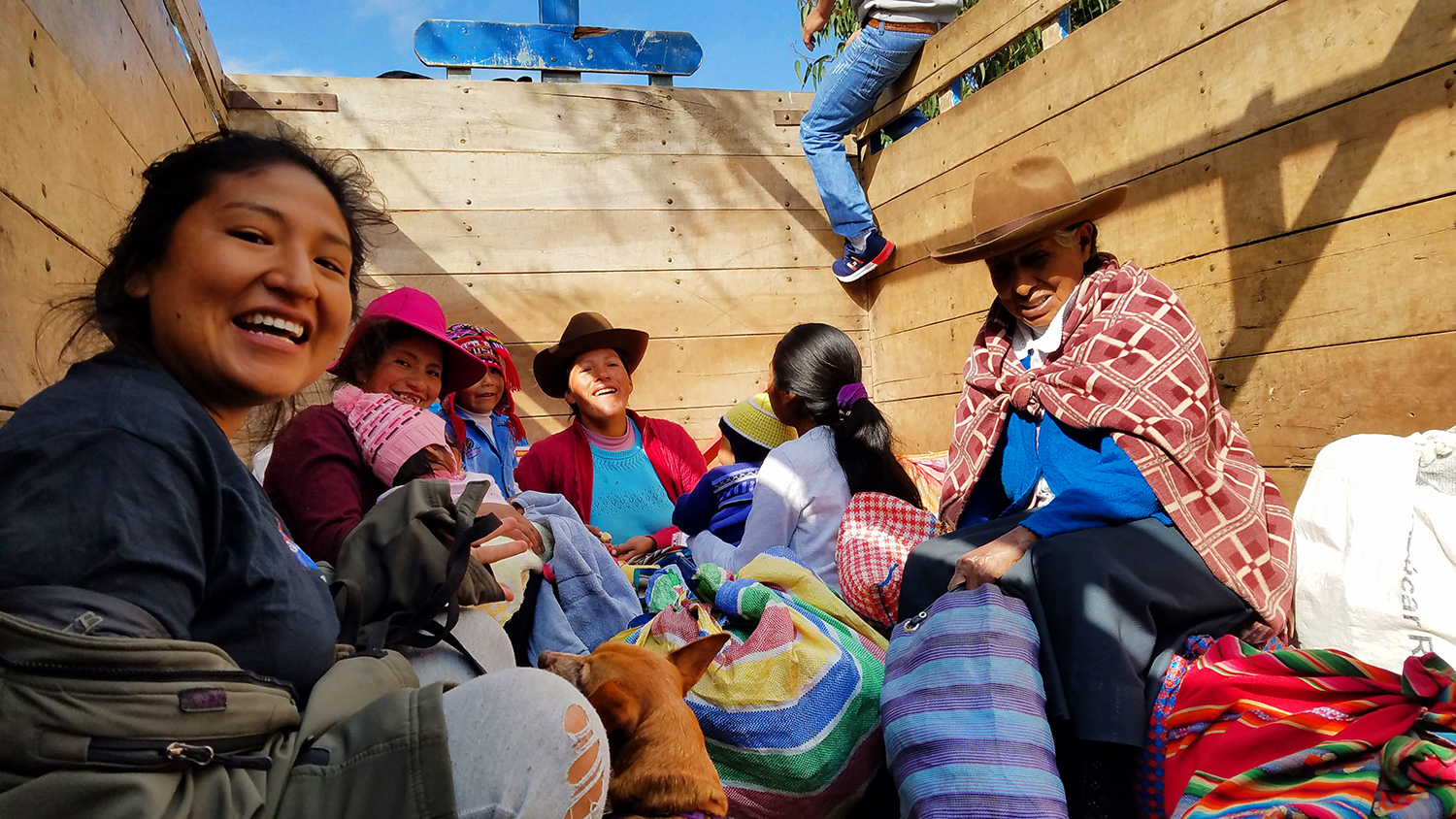
Quechua travelers in the Andes

In recent decades, Peruvian emigration figures have shown a marked growth and currently more than 10% of Peruvians are residing outside the country. This migratory movement has been accentuated since the year 2000, the official figure of Peruvian emigrants is 3,505,511 from 1994 to 2024. This without considering the descendant population, and the illegal floating population that is essentially found in neighboring countries. With respect to the main countries of destination for Peruvian emigrants between 1994 and 2023, these were: the United States (30.4%), Spain (16.1%), Argentina (12.9%), Chile (11.6%), Italy (10.3%), Japan (3.6%) and Canada (1.9%). 75% of Peruvian emigrants are between 15 and 49 years old, with a slight majority of women. For the most part, Peruvian emigration is a labor migration.

Throughout its history, Peru has received migrations from Europe (mainly Spain and Italy; and to a lesser extent from France, United Kingdom, and from other Central European countries and Southern), sub-Saharan Africa and East Asia (China and Japan). It currently receives a large number of Venezuelan immigrants, who are escaping the economic crisis that their country is suffering.

From 2016, the flow of Venezuelans to Peru increased, going from 6,615 residents in that year to around 820,000 until mid-June 2019, being the most important migratory wave of the 21st century in the country. Peru is home to the second largest number of Venezuelan immigrants after Colombia.

=== Language ===
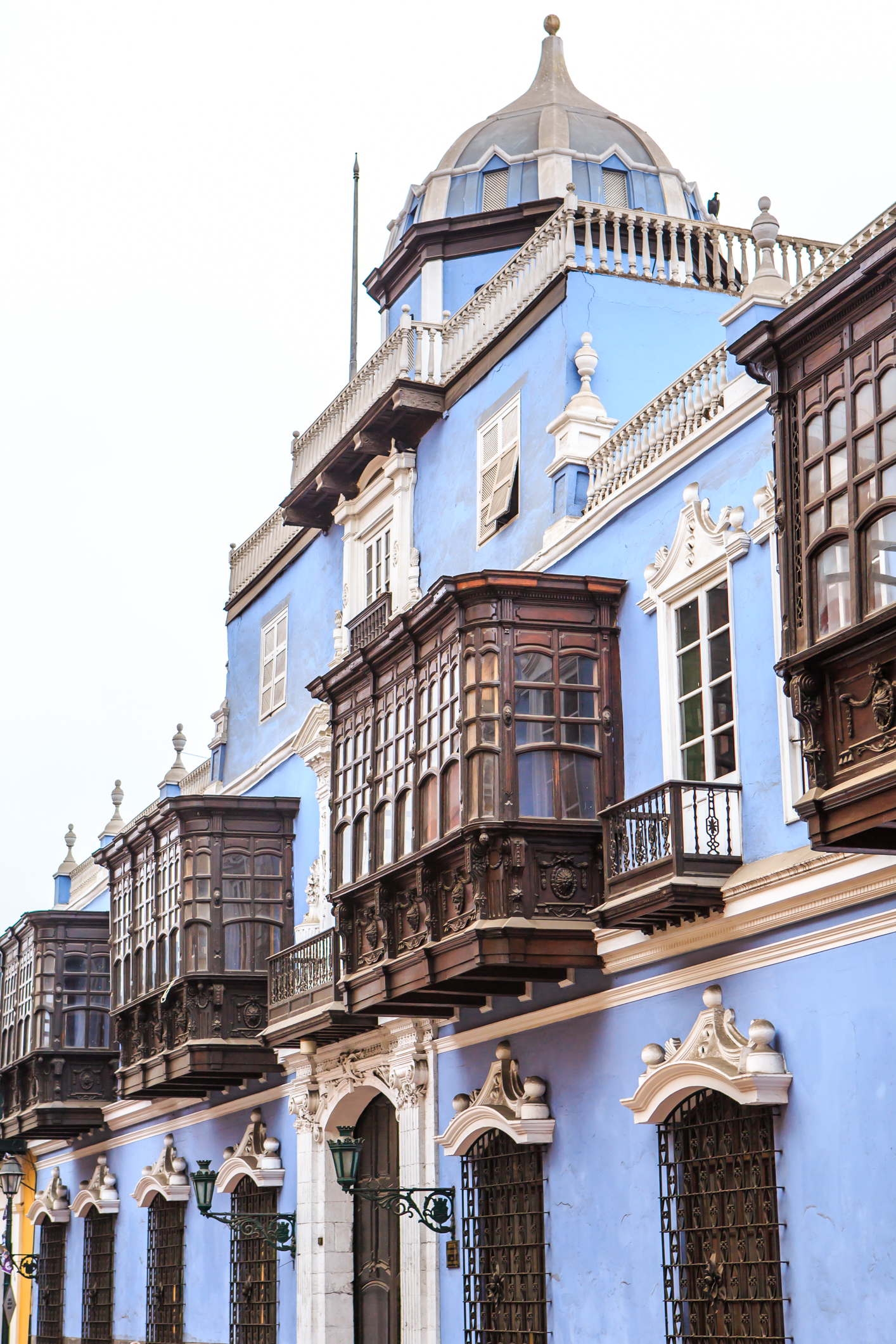
Casa de Osambela, headquarters of the Academia Peruana de la Lengua (APL) in Lima

According to the Peruvian Constitution of 1993, Peru's official languages are Spanish and, in areas where they predominate, Quechua and other Indigenous languages. Spanish is spoken natively by 82.6% of the population, and coexists with several native languages, of which the most important is the Quechuan languages, spoken by 16.92% of the population, 1.7% Aymara and 0.8% speaking another native language. In the urban areas of the country, especially in the coastal region, monolingualism of Spanish predominates; while in many rural areas of the country, particularly in the Amazon, multilingual populations dominate.

Spanish language is used by the government and is the mainstream language of the country, which is used by the media and in educational systems and commerce. Amerindians who live in the Andean highlands speak Quechua and Aymara and are ethnically distinct from the diverse Indigenous groups who live on the eastern side of the Andes and in the tropical lowlands adjacent to the Amazon basin.

Peru's distinct geographical regions are mirrored in a language divide between the coast where Spanish is more predominant over the Amerindian languages, and the more diverse traditional Andean cultures of the mountains and highlands. The Indigenous populations east of the Andes speak various languages and dialects. Some of these groups still adhere to traditional Indigenous languages, while others have been almost completely assimilated into the Spanish language. There has been an increasing and organized effort to teach Quechua in public schools in the areas where Quechua is spoken. In the Peruvian Amazon, numerous Indigenous languages are spoken, including Asháninka, Bora, and Aguaruna.

=== Religion ===
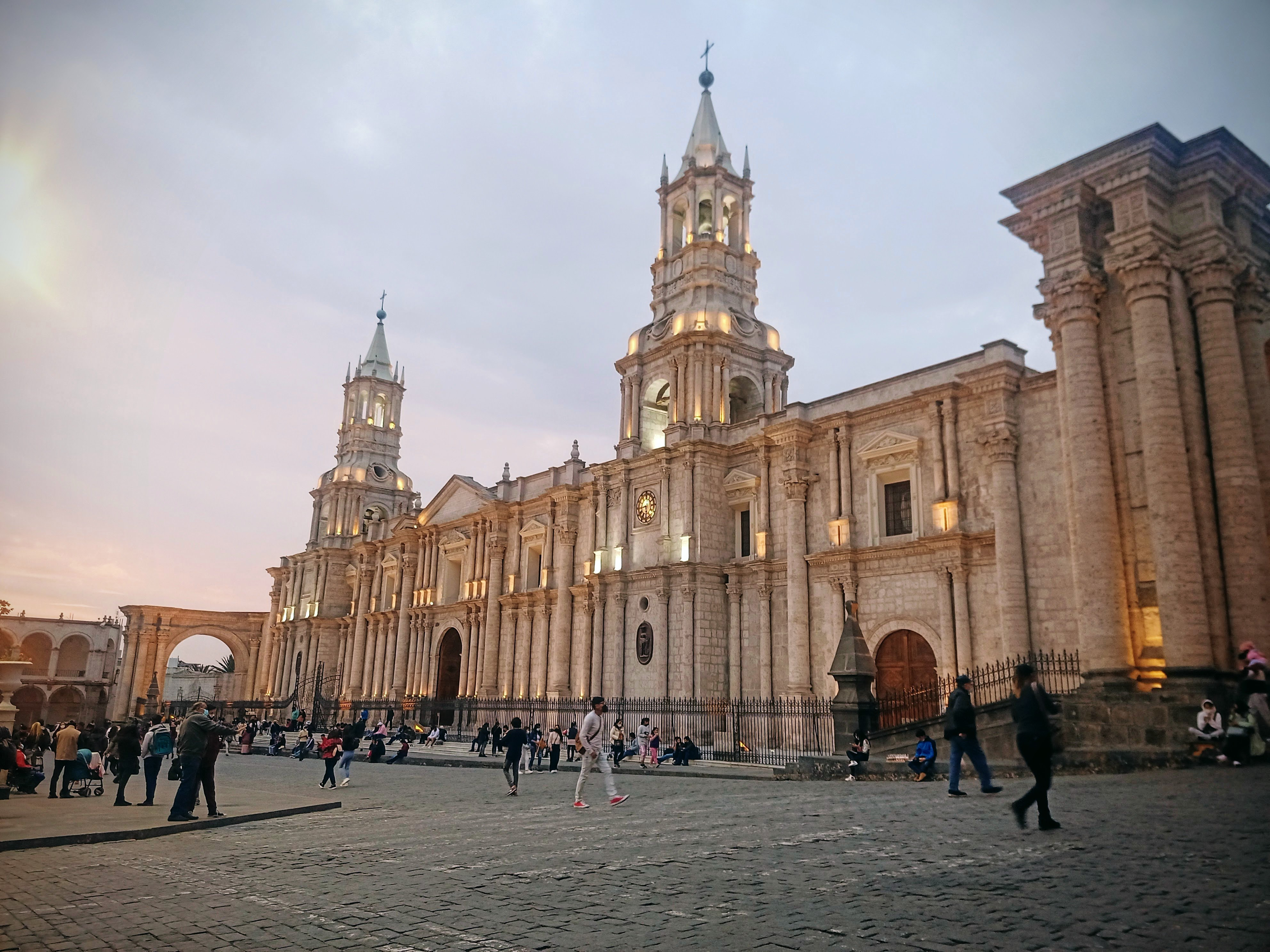
Basilica Cathedral of Arequipa

Roman Catholicism has been the predominant faith in Peru for centuries, albeit religious practices have a high degree of syncretism with Indigenous traditions. Two of its universities, Pontifical Catholic University of Peru and Universidad Católica San Pablo, are among the country's five top universities. As of the 2017 census, 76% of the population over 12 years old described themselves as Catholic; 14.1% as Evangelical; 4.8% as Protestant, Jewish, Latter-day Saints, and Jehovah's Witnesses; and 5.1% as nonreligious. In 2025, naturalized Peruvian citizen Cardinal Robert Francis Prevost became Pope Leo XIV.

Amerindian religious traditions continue to play a major role in the beliefs of Peruvians. Catholic festivities like Corpus Christi, Holy Week and Christmas sometimes blend with Amerindian traditions. Pre-Columbian Amerindian festivities remain widespread; Inti Raymi, an ancient Inca festival, is still celebrated, especially in rural communities.

The majority of towns, cities, and villages have their own official church or cathedral and patron saint. The two saints of Peru are Rose of Lima, the first Saint of the Americas, and Martin de Porres. The largest cathedral in Peru is the Metropolitan Cathedral of Lima. Its construction began in 1535 by under Francisco Pizarro and was completed in 1797. Other notable churches and cathedrals are the Cusco Cathedral Basilica Cathedral of Arequipa and the Basilica of Santo Domingo.

=== Education ===
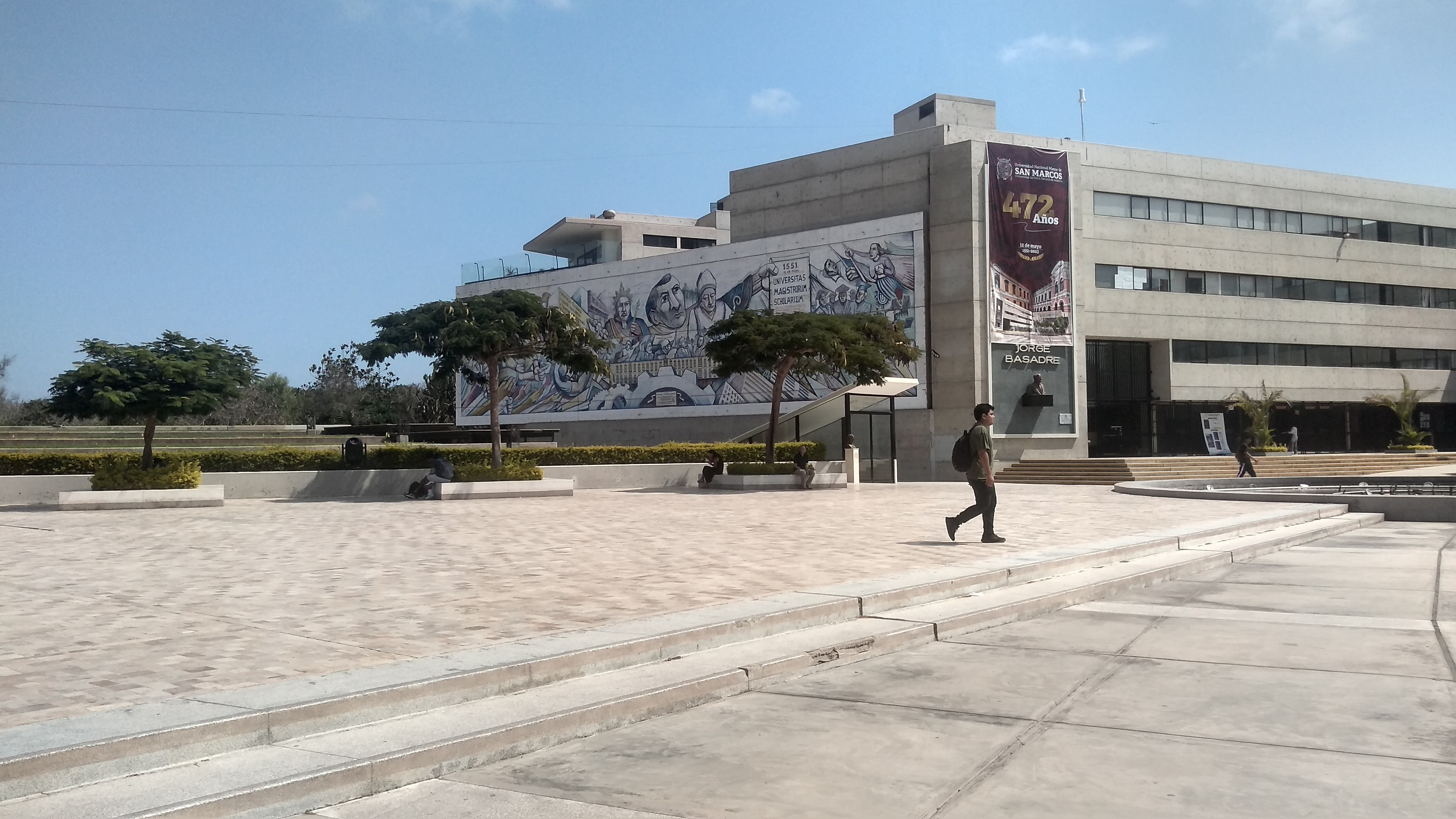
National University of San Marcos located in Lima, the oldest university in the Americas

In Peru, education is under the jurisdiction of the Ministry of Education, which is in charge of formulating, implementing and supervising the national education policy. According to the Political Constitution of Peru, education is compulsory and free in public schools for the initial, primary and secondary levels. It is also free in public universities for students who have satisfactory academic performance and pass the admission exams. Most of the schools in Peru are private and religious. Peru's literacy rate is estimated at 92.9% as of 2007; this rate is lower in rural areas (80.3%) than in urban areas (96.3%).

Education is divided into different levels: Initial education corresponds to the period between zero and five years of age, and is in charge of cribs whose purpose is to provide children with the stimulation required for their comprehensive development and the gardens that offer technical-pedagogical activities. Primary education begins with the first cycle, made up of the first and second grades. The entry age for children is six years old. This level begins in the first grade and ends in the sixth grade of primary school. Secondary education consists of five years, from first to fifth year. Then comes higher education that can be technical, productive, technological or university. To enter universities it is essential to take an admission exam, although the difficulty of this depends on the requirements of the university.

Peru is home to one of the oldest institutions of higher learning in the New World. The National University of San Marcos, founded on 12 May 1551, during the Viceroyalty of Peru, is the first officially established and the oldest continuously functioning university in the Americas. The University of San Marcos is known to be the best in Peru and among the best in South America.

=== Health ===
According to the Pan American Health Organization, life expectancy for men is 72.6 years, while for women it is 77.9 years. Infant mortality is eighteen per thousand births, having been reduced 76% from 1990 to 2011. The main causes of death of Peruvians are neoplasm, influenza and pneumonia, bacterial diseases, ischemic heart diseases and cerebrovascular diseases. According to the 2017 Population and Housing Censuses, 75.5% of the population has some type of health insurance, that is, 22,173,663 people, despite this, 24.5% of the population does not have any type of insurance.

=== Toponyms ===
Many of the Peruvian toponyms have Indigenous sources. In the Andes communities of Ancash, Cusco and Puno, Quechua or Aymara names are overwhelmingly predominant. Their Spanish-based orthography, however, is in conflict with the normalized alphabets of these languages. According to Article 20 of Decreto Supremo No 004-2016-MC (Supreme Decree) which approves the Regulations to Law 29735, published in the official newspaper El Peruano on 22 July 2016, adequate spellings of the toponyms in the normalized alphabets of the Indigenous languages must progressively be proposed with the aim of standardizing the naming used by the National Geographic Institute (Instituto Geográfico Nacional, IGN). The National Geographic Institute realizes the necessary changes in the official maps of Peru.

== Culture ==
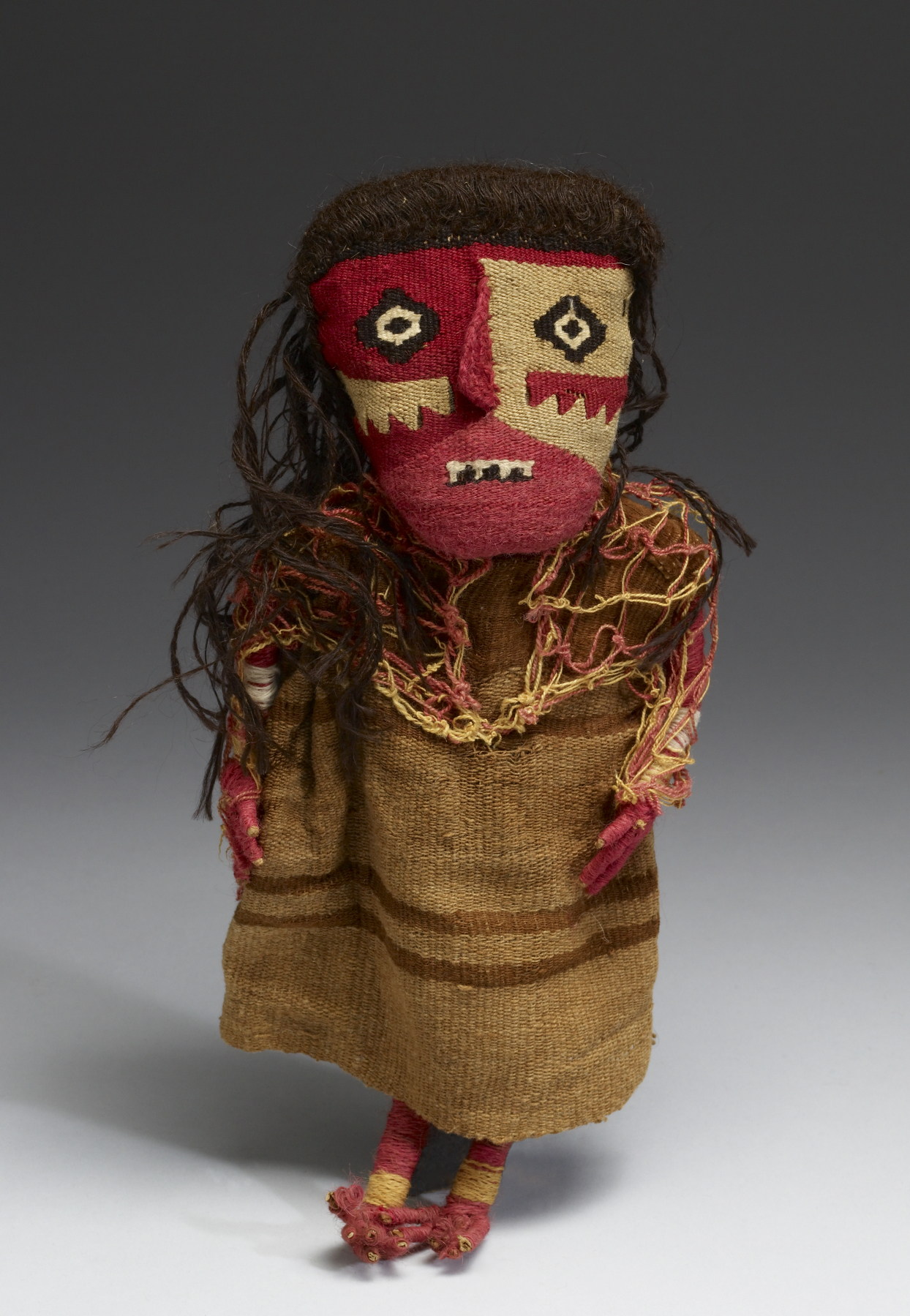
11th-century textile doll, Chancay culture, Walters Art Museum. Dolls are frequently found in the tombs of ancient Peru.

Peruvian culture is primarily rooted in Iberian and Andean traditions, though it has also been influenced by various European, Asian, and African ethnic groups. Peruvian artistic traditions date back to the elaborate pottery, textiles, jewelry, and sculpture of Pre-Inca cultures. The Incas maintained these crafts and made architectural achievements including the construction of Machu Picchu. Baroque dominated colonial art, though modified by Native traditions.

During this period, most art focused on religious subjects; the numerous churches of the era and the paintings of the Cusco School are representative. Arts stagnated after independence until the emergence of Indigenismo in the early 20th century. Since the 1950s, Peruvian art has been eclectic and shaped by both foreign and local art currents.

=== Visual arts ===
Peruvian art has its origin in the Andean civilizations. These civilizations arose in the territory of modern Peru before the arrival of the Spanish. Peruvian art incorporated European elements after the Spanish conquest and continued to evolve throughout the centuries up to the modern day.

==== Pre-Columbian art ====
Peru's earliest artwork came from the Cupisnique culture, which was concentrated on the Pacific coast, and the Chavín culture, which was largely north of Lima between the Andean mountain ranges of the Cordillera Negra and the Cordillera Blanca. Decorative work from this era, approximately the 9th century BCE, was symbolic and religious in nature. The artists worked with gold, silver, and ceramics to create a variety of sculptures and relief carvings. These civilizations were also known for their architecture and wood sculptures.

The Paracas Cavernas and Paracas Necropolis cultures developed on the south coast of Peru between the 9th century BCE and the 2nd century CE. Paracas Cavernas produced complex polychrome and monochrome ceramics with religious representations. Burials from the Paracas Necropolis also yielded complex textiles, many produced with sophisticated geometric patterns. The 3rd century BCE saw the flowering of the urban culture, Moche, in the Lambayeque region. The Moche culture produced architectural works, such as the Huacas del Sol y de la Luna and the Huaca Rajada of Sipán. They were experts at cultivation in terraces and hydraulic engineering and produced original ceramics, textiles, pictorial and sculptural works. Another urban culture, the Wari civilization, flourished between the 8th and 12th centuries in Ayacucho. Their centralized town planning was extended to other areas, such as Pachacamac, Cajamarquilla and Wari Willka. Between the 9th and 13th centuries CE, the military urban Tiwanaku empire rose by the borders of Lake Titicaca. Centered around a city of the same name in modern-day Bolivia, the Tiwanaku introduced stone architecture and sculpture of a monumental type. These works of architecture and art were made possible by the Tiwanaku's developing bronze, which enabled them to make the necessary tools.

Urban architecture reached a new height between the 14th and 15th centuries in the Chimú Culture. The Chimú built the city of Chan Chan in the valley of the Moche River, in La Libertad. The Chimú were skilled goldsmiths and created remarkable works of hydraulic engineering. The Inca Civilization, which united Peru under its hegemony in the centuries immediately preceding the Spanish conquest, incorporated into their own works a great part of the cultural legacy of the civilizations which preceded it. Important relics of their artwork and architecture can be seen in cities like Cusco, architectural remains like Sacsayhuamán and Machu Picchu and stone pavements that united Cusco with the rest of the Inca Empire.

==== Colonial art ====
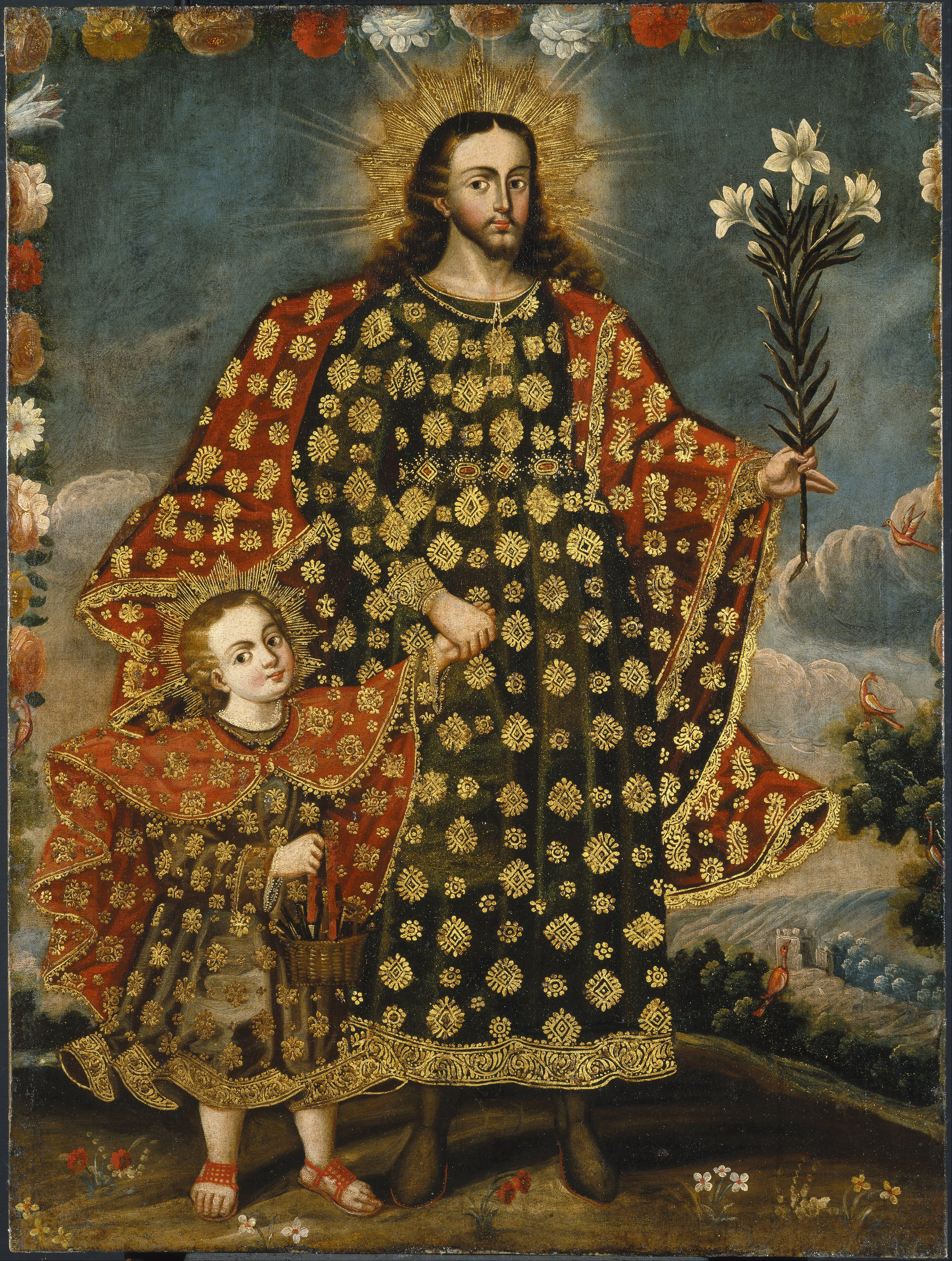
Saint Joseph and the Christ Child, Anonymous, Colonial Cusco Painting School, 17th–18th century

Peruvian sculpture and painting began to define themselves from the ateliers founded by monks, who were strongly influenced by the Sevillian Baroque School. In this context, the stalls of the Cathedral choir, the fountain of the Main Square of Lima both by Pedro de Noguera, and a great part of the colonial production were registered. The first center of art established by the Spanish was the Cuzco School that taught Quechua artists European painting styles. Diego Quispe Tito (1611–1681) was one of the first members of the Cuzco school and Marcos Zapata (1710–1773) was one of the last.

Painting of this time reflected a synthesis of European and Indigenous influences, as is evident in the portrait of prisoner Atahualpa, by D. de Mora or in the canvases of the Italians Mateo Pérez de Alesio and Angelino Medoro, the Spaniards Francisco Bejarano and J. de Illescas and the Creole J. Rodriguez.

During the 17th and 18th centuries, the Baroque and Rococo styles, with their heavy ornamentation and predominantly curved lines, also dominated the fields of architecture and plastic arts, as for example on the walls of the Monastery of San Francisco in Lima.

=== Literature ===
Peruvian literature refers not only to literature produced in the modern Republic of Peru, but also literature produced in the Viceroyalty of Peru during the colonial period, and to oral traditions created by diverse ethnic groups living in what is now Peru during the pre-Columbian period, such as the Quechua, the Aymara and the Chanka people.

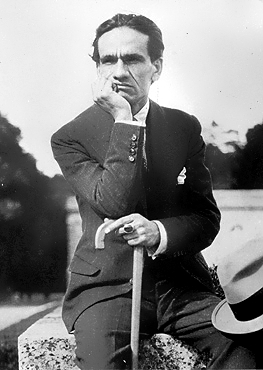
Cesar Vallejo, Peru's most famous poet

Spaniards introduced writing in the 16th century; colonial literary expression included chronicles and religious literature. Some of the first chroniclers were writers and soldiers who were responsible for producing official transcripts of military expeditions. There was also a small group of non-official chroniclers or personal diarists who provided unique personal insights on the effort to subdue and colonize the region. For the most part, these chroniclers all wrote from the perspective of Spanish conquistadores, whose mission was to "civilize" and "reveal the true faith" to the native peoples of Peru. Among the official Spanish chroniclers were Francisco Xerez, personal secretary of Pizarro, who wrote the Verdadera relación de la conquista del Perú y provincia del Cuzco llamada la Nueva Castilla (The True Narrative of the Conquest of Peru and of Cuzco Province, Otherwise Known as New Castile), in 1534. Indigenous chroniclers were also known, such as Titu Cusi Yupanqui who, after familiarizing himself with Spanish culture, wrote Relación de cómo los españoles entraron en Pirú y el subceso que tuvo Mango Inca en el tiempo en que entre ellos vivió (The Narrative of How the Spaniards Entered Piru and Mango Inca's Experiences while Living Among Them) in 1570.

After independence, Costumbrism and Romanticism became the most common literary genres, as exemplified in the works of Ricardo Palma. The early 20th century's Indigenismo movement was led by such writers as Ciro Alegría and José María Arguedas. The avant-garde movement of the late 19th and early 20th centuries saw the establishment of magazines Colónida and Amauta, the latter founded in 1926 by the prominent socialist essayist José Carlos Mariátegui. The influential poet César Vallejo, who was one of its collaborators, wrote modernist and often politically engaged verse in the 1920s and 1930s. Modern Peruvian literature is recognized thanks to authors such as Nobel laureate Mario Vargas Llosa, a leading member of the Latin American Boom.

=== Music ===
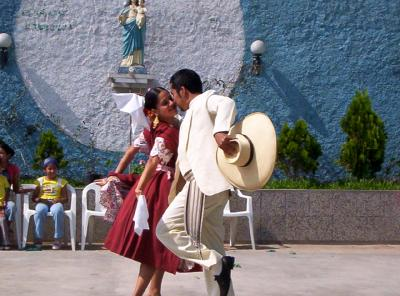
Marinera was declared cultural heritage of the Nation in 1986

Peruvian music has Andean, Spanish, and African roots. In pre-Columbian times, musical expressions varied widely in each region; the quena and the tinya were two common instruments. Spaniards introduced new instruments, such as the guitar and the harp, which led to the development of crossbred instruments like the charango. African contributions to Peruvian music include its rhythms and the cajón, a percussion instrument. Peruvian folk dances include marinera, tondero, zamacueca, diablada and huayno.

Peruvian music is dominated by the national instrument, the charango. The charango is a member of the lute family of instruments and was invented during colonial times by musicians imitating the Spanish vihuela. In the Canas and Titicaca regions, the charango is used in courtship rituals, symbolically invoking mermaids with the instrument to lure the woman to the male performers. Until the 1960s, the charango was denigrated as an instrument of the rural poor. After the revolution in 1959, which built the Indigenismo movement (1910–1940), the charango was popularized among other performers. Variants include the walaycho, chillador, chinlili, and the larger and lower-tuned charangon.

While the Spanish guitar is widely played, so too is the Spanish-in-origin bandurria. Unlike the guitar, it has been transformed by Peruvian players over the years, changing from a 12-string, 6-course instrument to one having 12 to 16 strings in a mere four courses. Violins and harps, also of European origin, are also played. A very famous instrument from Peru is the pan flute, dating back to Incan times. It is made of hollow bamboo tubes and is widely played in the Peruvian Andes.

The country also has some rock and pop singers and bands of great acceptance, both nationally and internationally such as: Susan Ochoa, Anna Carina, Jean Paul Strauss, Leslie Shaw, Raúl Romero, Gian Marco and Pedro Suárez-Vértiz, winners of awards such as the Latin Grammy Awards and Orgullosamente Latino Award. Peru is also the country that saw the birth of Los Saicos, considered the first garage rock and protopunk band in the world. Other famous Peruvian rock bands include Arena Hash, Nosequien y Los Nosecuantos, Frágil, Amen, and Mar de Copas.

=== Cinema ===
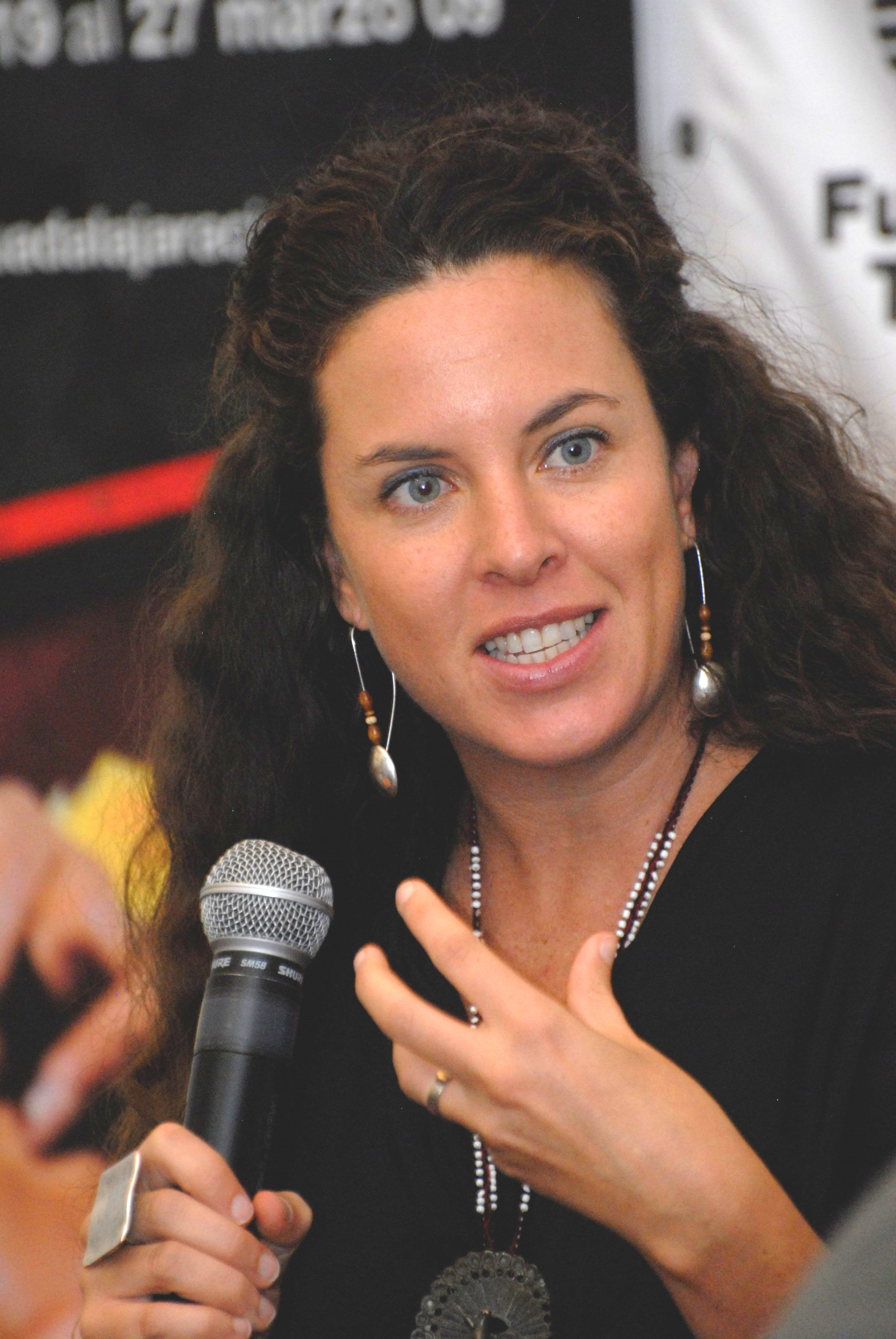
Award-winning filmmaker Claudia Llosa

While the Peruvian film industry has not been nearly as prolific as that of some other Latin American countries, some Peruvian movies have enjoyed regional success. Historically, the cinema of Peru began in Iquitos in 1932 with Antonio Wong Rengifo (alongside a significant early film billboard from 1900) due to the rubber boom and the influx of foreigners bringing technology to the city. This led to the development of an extensive and distinctive filmography, characterized by a style different from the films produced in the capital, Lima.

Peru also produced the first animated 3-D film in Hispanic America, Piratas en el Callao. This film is set in the historical port city of Callao, which during colonial times had to defend itself against attacks by Dutch and British privateers seeking to undercut Spain's trade with its colonies. The film was produced by the Peruvian company Alpamayo Entertainment, which made a second 3-D film one year later: Dragones: Destino de Fuego.

In February 2006, the film Madeinusa, produced as a joint venture between Peru and Spain and directed by Claudia Llosa, was set in an imaginary Andean village and describes the stagnating life of Madeinusa performed by Magaly Solier and the traumas of post-civil war Peru.

Llosa, who drew inspiration from elements of Gabriel García Márquez's magic realism, won an award at the Rotterdam Film Festival. Llosa's second feature, The Milk of Sorrow ("La Teta Asustada"), was nominated for the 82nd Academy Awards for Best Foreign Language Picture, the first Peruvian film in the academy's history to be nominated. The film won the Golden Bear at the 59th Berlin International Film Festival.

=== Cuisine ===
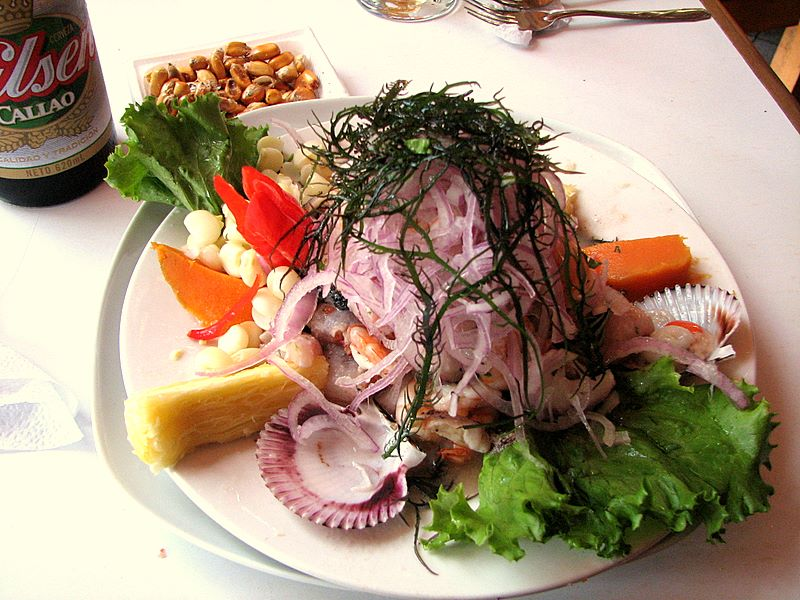
Ceviche is a popular lime-marinated seafood dish which originated in Peru.

Because of the Spanish expedition and discovery of America, explorers started the Columbian exchange which included unknown food in the Old World, including potatoes, tomatoes, and maize. Modern Indigenous Peruvian food often includes corn, potatoes, and chilies. There are now more than 3,000 kinds of potatoes grown on Peruvian terrain, according to Peru's Instituto Peruano de la Papa. Modern Peruvian cuisine blends Amerindian and Spanish food with strong influences from Chinese, African, Arab, Italian, and Japanese cooking. Common dishes include anticuchos, ceviche, and pachamanca. Peru's varied climate allows the growth of diverse plants and animals good for cooking. Peru is known to have one of the best cuisines in the world. The capital, Lima, is home to Central Restaurante, which is one of the World's Best Restaurants and serves various Peruvian dishes from each geographical part of the country, the Costa (coast), Sierra (mountains) and Selva (rainforest).

Peruvian cuisine reflects local practices and ingredients – including influences from the Indigenous population such as the Inca and cuisines introduced by colonizers and immigrants. Without the familiar ingredients from their home countries, immigrants modified their traditional cuisines by using ingredients available in Peru. The four traditional staples of Peruvian cuisine are corn, potatoes and other tubers, Amaranthaceaes (quinoa, kañiwa and kiwicha) and legumes (beans and lupins). Staples brought by the Spanish include rice, wheat, and meats (beef, pork, and chicken). Many traditional foods – such as quinoa, kiwicha, chili peppers, and several roots and tubers have increased in popularity in recent decades, reflecting a revival of interest in Native Peruvian foods and culinary techniques. It is also common to see traditional cuisines being served with a modern flair in towns like Cusco, where tourists come to visit. Chef Gastón Acurio has become well known for raising awareness of local ingredients.

=== Sport ===
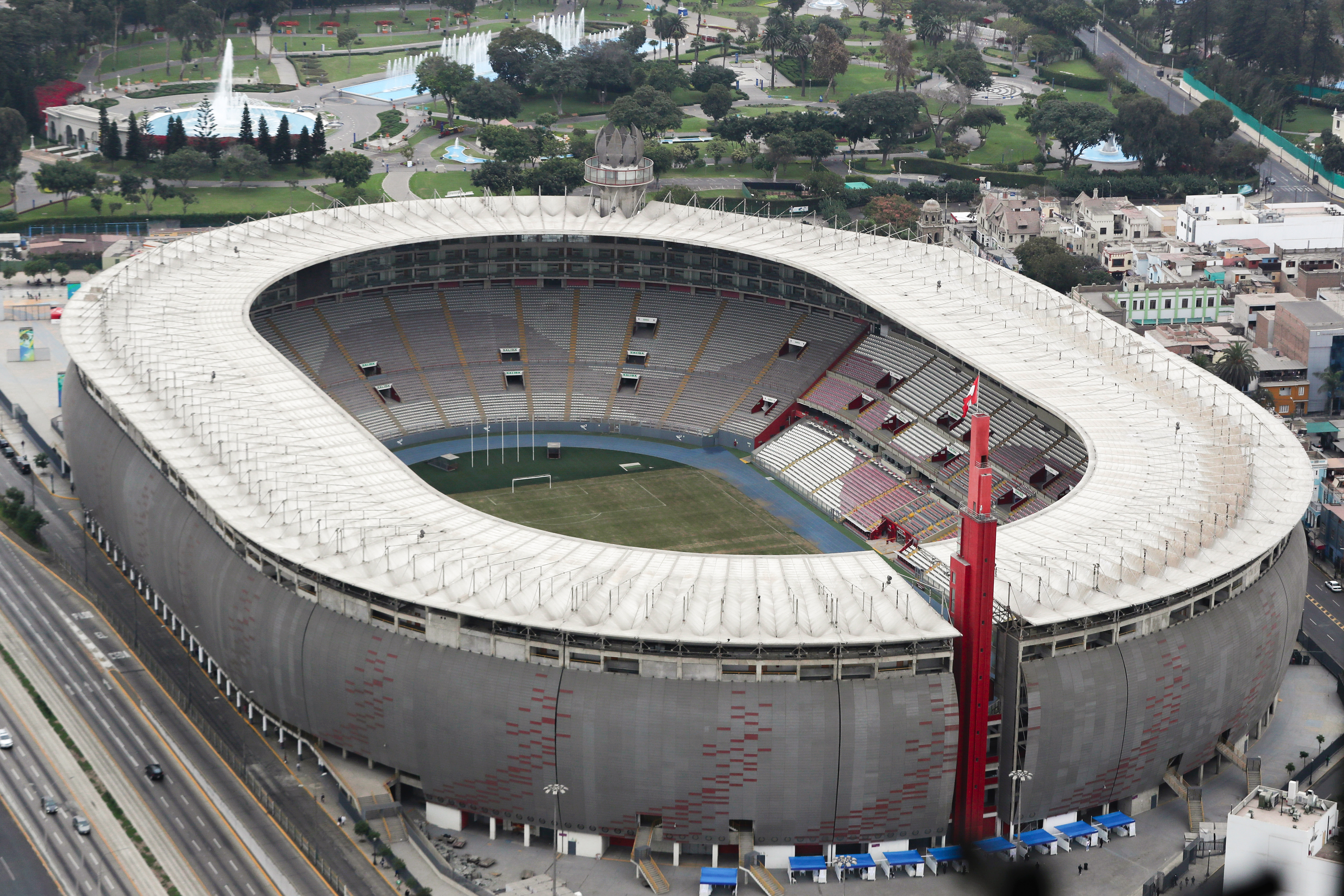
Estadio Nacional del Perú in 2021

The idea of sport dates back to the arrival of the Spanish in the 16th century, though many games and other native forms of entertainment predated the colonial era. More recently, the American ideology of physical education linked to commercialization has had widespread appeal. Sports in the country are divided into several sports federations (one for each sports practice) that are under the tutelage of the highest state entity to regulate their practice, the Peruvian Sports Institute (IPD). Most of the sports federations are based in the Villa Deportiva Nacional in Lima. Peru's largest stadium is Estadio Monumental "U" which has a capacity of over 80,000, making it the second largest stadium in South America. The country's national stadium is the Estadio Nacional. Peru has hosted various sporting events, such as the 2004 Copa América, 2005 FIFA U-17 World Championship, 2013 and 2024 Bolivarian Games, and the largest sporting event held by the country, the 2019 Pan American Games. The national sport of Peru is Paleta frontón, which has developed in the 16th century in Lima.

Football is the most popular and widely practiced sport in the country. The Peruvian Primera División is the most important club tournament in the nation. The men's team has had some important performances on the world stage. They participated in the FIFA World Cup five times. Likewise, they have been champions of the Copa América on two occasions, in 1939 and 1975, and impressed at the 1936 Summer Olympics before going home after withdrawing from a walkover given to Austria in the quarter-final. Teófilo Cubillas is considered Peru's greatest footballer. At the club level, Universitario stands out with the runner-up in the Copa Libertadores in 1972 and Sporting Cristal also with the runner-up in 1997. The only Peruvian clubs with international titles are Cienciano, which won the 2003 Recopa Sudamericana and the 2004 Recopa Sudamericana, and Universitario, champion of the 2011 U-20 Copa Libertadores.

Other popular sports in Peru are volleyball, surfing and karate. Peru has won multiple gold, silver, and bronze medals at the Pan American Games. The Peru women's national volleyball team was one of the dominant teams in the 1980s and 90s and won the silver medal at the 1988 Summer Olympics, losing to the Soviet Union 3–2 after having led by a wide margin. Peru has usually been very good at surfing and volleyball.

== See also ==
- Mass media in Peru
- Outline of Peru

== Bibliography ==
- Bailey, Gauvin Alexander. Art of colonial Latin America. London: Phaidon, 2005. ISBN 0714841579.
- Constitución Política del Perú. 29 December 1993.
- Custer, Tony. The Art of Peruvian Cuisine. Lima: Ediciones Ganesha, 2003. ISBN 9972920305.
- Garland, Gonzalo. "Perú Siglo XXI", series of 11 working papers describing sectorial long-term forecasts, Grade, Lima, Peru, 1986–1987.
- Garland, Gonzalo. Peru in the 21st Century: Challenges and Possibilities in Futures: the Journal of Forecasting, Planning, and Policy, Volume 22, No. 4, Butterworth-Heinemann, London, England, May 1990.
- Gootenberg, Paul. (1991) Between silver and guano: commercial policy and the state in postindependence Peru. Princeton: Princeton University Press. ISBN 0691023425.
- Gootenberg, Paul. (1993) Imagining development: economic ideas in Peru's "fictitious prosperity" of Guano, 1840–1880. Berkeley: University of California Press. ISBN 0520082907.
- Higgins, James (editor). The Emancipation of Peru: British Eyewitness Accounts, 2014. Online at jhemanperu Archived 21 April 2020 at the Wayback Machine
- Instituto de Estudios Histórico–Marítimos del Perú. El Perú y sus recursos: Atlas geográfico y económico. Lima: Auge, 1996.
- Instituto Nacional de Estadística e Informática. "Perú: Compendio Estadístico 2005" (PDF). Archived from the original (PDF) on 7 March 2007. (8.31 MB). Lima: INEI, 2005.
- Instituto Nacional de Estadística e Informática. Perfil sociodemográfico del Perú. Lima: INEI, 2008.
- Instituto Nacional de Estadística e Informática. Perú: Estimaciones y Proyecciones de Población, 1950–2050. Lima: INEI, 2001.
- Ley N° 27178, Ley del Servicio Militar DOC. 28 September 1999.
- Ley N° 27867, Ley Orgánica de Gobiernos Regionales. 16 November 2002.
- Martin, Gerald. "Literature, music and the visual arts, c. 1820–1870". In: Leslie Bethell (ed.), A cultural history of Latin America. Cambridge: University of Cambridge, 1998, pp. 3–45.
- Martin, Gerald. "Narrative since c. 1920". In: Leslie Bethell (ed.), A cultural history of Latin America. Cambridge: University of Cambridge, 1998, pp. 133–225.
- Porras Barrenechea, Raúl. El nombre del Perú. Lima: Talleres Gráficos P.L. Villanueva, 1968.
- Scheina, Robert (2003), Latin America's Wars: The Age of the Caudillo, 1791–1899, Brassey's, ISBN 978-1-57488-450-0
- Thorp, Rosemary, and Geoffrey Bertram. Peru 1890–1977: growth and policy in an open economy. New York: Columbia University Press, 1978. ISBN 0231034334
