= Dialogando =

Studio album by Chabuca Granda and Óscar Avilés

Studio album by Chabuca Granda
- Released: 1967
- Label: Iempsa
- Producer: Oscar Aviles

Dialogando is a studio album by Peruvian singer and composer Chabuca Granda and Peruvian guitarist Óscar Avilés. The album was released in 1967 on the Iempsa label (catalog no. ELD-1704).

In 1967, Granda's international reputation grew following tours of the United States and South America. During this tour, she performed at times with Avilés, and the pair recorded the album, "Dialogando". The album concluded with three of Granda's most famous compositions: "José Antonio", "El puente de los suspiros", and "La flor de la canela".

Granda and Avilés were later reunited on the 1973 album Grande De América.

== Track listing ==
Side A

1. "Bello durmiente" (vals)
2. "Camaron" (vals)
3. "Herida obscura" (marinera)
4. "Arequepay" (vals)
5. "Maria Sueños" (vals)

Side B

1. "Pobre voz" (vals)
2. "Puño de oro" (vals)
3. "José Antonio" (vals)
4. "El puente de los suspiros" (vals)
5. "La flor de la canela" (vals)
