= Regresa =

Regresa (Spanish "Come Back") may refer to:

- Regresa (film), a 2010 Mexican film
- Regresa, a 1990 album by Mexican singer Chantal Andere, or its title song
- Regresa, a 1960 album by Dominican singer Alberto Beltrán
- Regresa, a 1970 album by Peruvian band Los Violines de Lima
- Regresa, a 1999 album by Bolivian band Los Ronisch
- "Regresa", a song written by Augusto Polo Campos
- "Regresa", a song by Grupo Bryndis album from Historia Musical Romántica

== See also ==
- Regresa a mí (disambiguation)
