= Grande De América =

Studio album by Chabuca Granda
- Released: 1973
- Label: RCA Victor

Grande De América is a studio album by Chabuca Granda released on the RCA Victor label in 1973.

The album was recorded during a period when Granda was living in Mexico. On side A of the album, she sang new compositions, including "¡Donde estás... Adelita! (Coplas a la Adelita)". She was accompanied on these recordings by Lucho González and Mariachi Vargas de Tecalitlán, under the direction of Rubén Fuentes. On Side B, she sang some of her most important older waltzes, including "Fina estampa", "José Antonio", and "La flor de la canela". She was accompanied on these tracks by Óscar Avilés on guitar and Chucho Ferrer on the organ.

Four songs from the album were later reissued on RCA's 2003 compilation celebrating 100 years of Latin American folklore music, "Lo Mejor del Folklore Latinoamericano: Coleccion RCA 100 Anos de Musica".

== Track listing ==
Side A

1. "¡Donde estás... Adelita! (Coplas a la Adelita)"
2. "El puente de los suspiros"
3. "En la margen opuesta "
4. "María Sueños "
5. "Camarón"

Side B

1. "Fina estampa"
2. "José Antonio"
3. "Zeño Manué "
4. "El dueño ausente"
5. "La flor de la canela"
