= La Voz Perú season 4 =

Peruvian reality singing competition

La Voz Perú
- Season 4
- Hosted by: Cristian Rivero; Karen Schwarz (Live shows only)
- Coaches: Eva Ayllon; Mike Bahía; Guillermo Dávila; Daniela Darcourt

Release
- Original network: Latina Televisión
- Original release: 14 June – 26 August 2021

The fourth season of the Peruvian reality singing competition La Voz Perú premiered on 14 June 2021, on Latina Televisión, and the show returned after six years of hiatus. Eva Ayllón returns as coach, joined by newcomers Mike Bahia, Daniela Darcourt, and Guillermo Dávila. Cristian Rivero remains as the host of the program, joined by Karen Schwarz for the live shows.

== Coaches and hosts ==
Coaches for season 4 of La Voz Perú

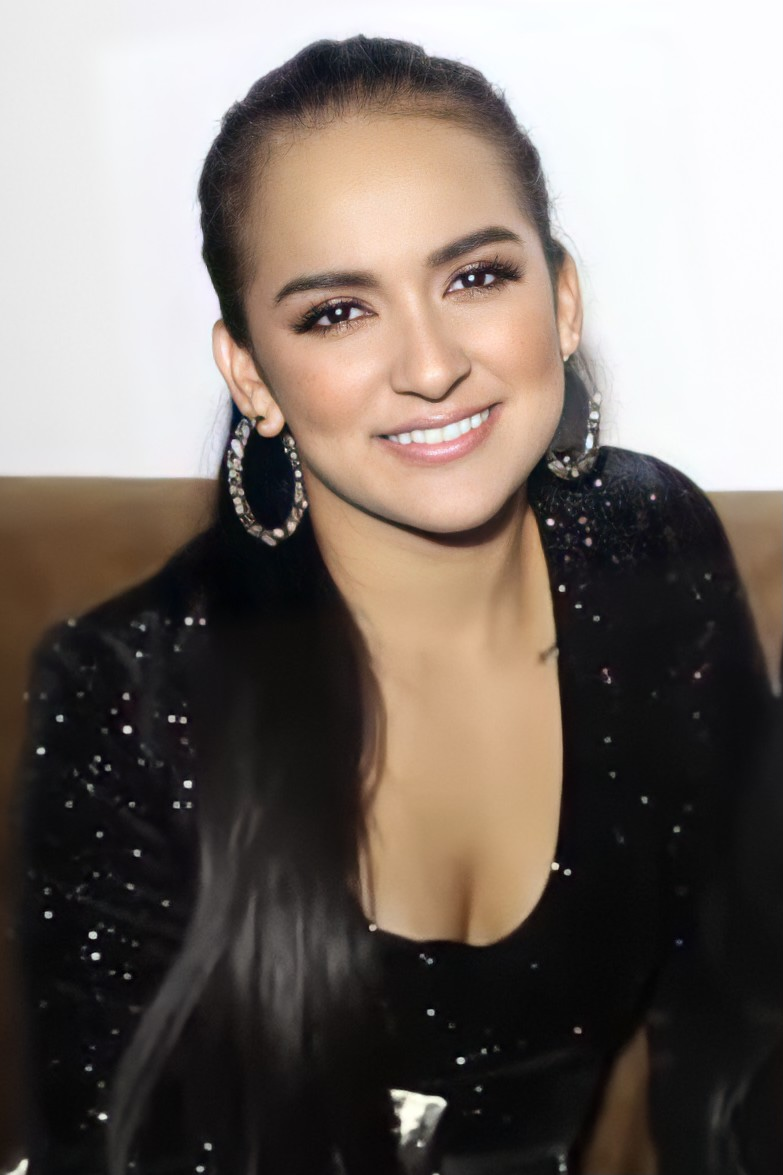
Daniela Darcourt

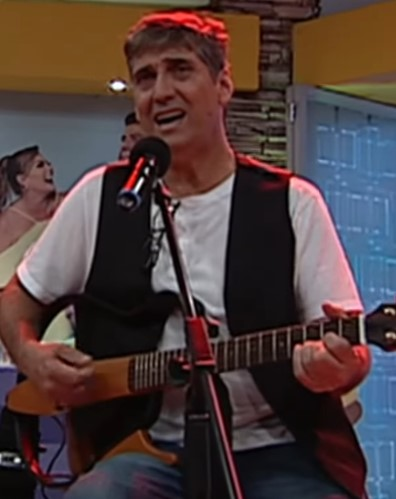
Guillermo Dávila

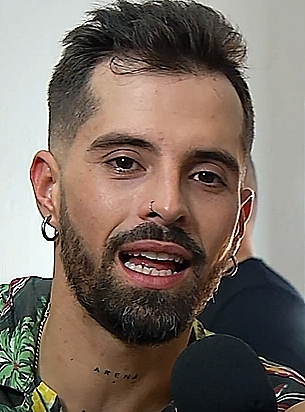
Mike Bahía

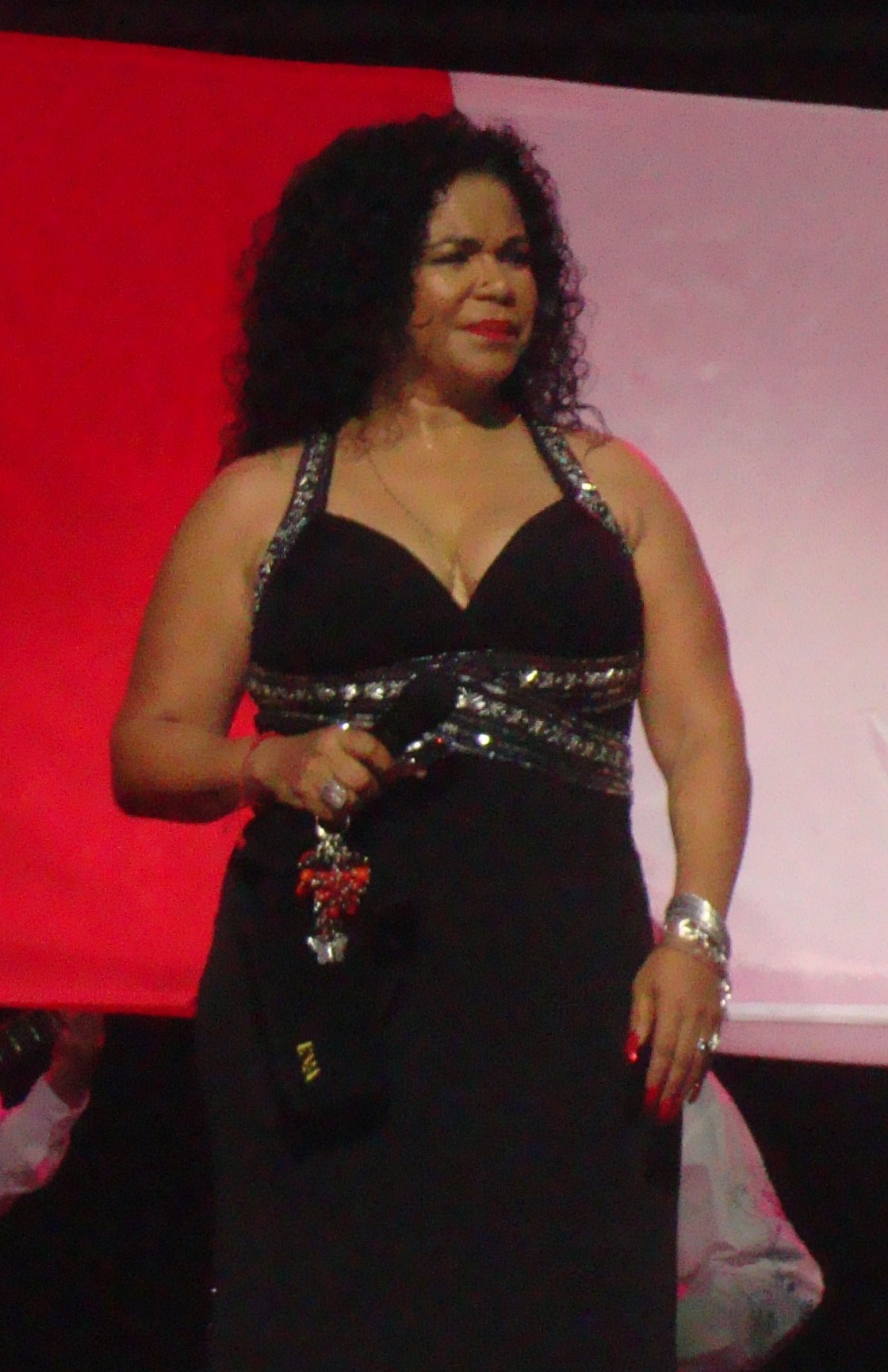
Eva Ayllón

After the announcement of the return of the show, returning coach Eva Ayllón was the first one announced for the fourth season. Mike Bahía, contestant on the first season of La Voz Colombia, was then announced to join Ayllón in the coaching panel. Daniella Darcourt was later announced as the third coach of the show, and in 26 May, the final coach was announced to be Guillermo Dávila.

Cristian Rivero returned for his fourth season as host. Karen Schwarz joined Rivero in hosting the program during the final phase, the live shows.

== Teams ==
=== Color key ===
- Winner
- Runner-up
- Third place
- Fourth place
- Eliminated in the Live semi-finals
- Eliminated in the Live quarter-finals
- Eliminated in the Live playoffs
- Eliminated in the Live round of 32
- Stolen in the Knockouts
- Eliminated in the Knockouts
- Eliminated in the Battles
- Withdrew

| Coaches | Top 113 artists | | | | | |
|---|---|---|---|---|---|---|
| Daniela Darcourt | | | | | | |
| Daniela Darcourt | Aldair Sánchez | Sebastián Palma | Joaquina Carruitero | Jair Montaño | Javo | Grace Morales |
| Daniela Darcourt | Freddy Armas | Jean Paul Moreno | ~~Natasha Hernández~~ | ~~Iván MC~~ | Marisella Valdivia | Tony Silva |
| Daniela Darcourt | Bryan Avilés | Mariale Pineda | Jonathan Sanes | Néstor Mugruza | Rony Merino | Luis Román |
| Daniela Darcourt | Lucero Koyama | Coralie Mestanza | Jonn Barboza | Fiorella Hidalgo | Víctor Díaz | Melissa Noblega |
| Daniela Darcourt | Brandymar Camacho | Julio Cornejo | Jova | Túpac "El Pitbull" | Noah Rodsick | |
| Guillermo Dávila | | | | | | |
| Guillermo Dávila | Marcela Navarro | Fito Flores | Sebastian Mahle | Emanuel Rivera | Edu Baluarte | Oriana Montero |
| Guillermo Dávila | Miluska Eskenazi | Joseph Buitrón | ~~Jean Paul Moreno~~ | Lucas Fonseca | Zelka Sosa | Sebastián Tello |
| Guillermo Dávila | Fernando Alcalde | Alex Vargas | Daniela Prado | Pamela Osorio | Analau | Isa Rondón |
| Guillermo Dávila | Michelle Castro | Daniela Zambrano | Juan de Dios Valdivia | Gabriela More | Marian Díaz | Vanessa Vásquez |
| Guillermo Dávila | Henry Delgado | Joselin Barrantes | Jonathan Evaristo | Nella Francis | Anita Molina | |
| Mike Bahía | | | | | | |
| Mike Bahía | Randy Feijoo | Jeyko Atoche | Iván MC | Nicolle Manrique | Stefano Grande | Jesús Zaez |
| Mike Bahía | Karin Idol | Paula Leonardi | Leonardo Navarro | Gonzalo Kujon | Pedro Crisanto | Maroa |
| Mike Bahía | Fabiola Cruzado | Nia Carpio | Sebastián Morillas | Jannis Knight | Cassiel | Andrea Victoria |
| Mike Bahía | Jean Paul S. Maríaus | Fideli | Camila Yesquén | Phano Rivera | Gabriela Balbás | Amanda Ortiz |
| Mike Bahía | Ray BG | Ana Olórtegui | Maru Silva | Esmeralda Díaz | Eva Nerea | |
| Eva Ayllón | | | | | | |
| Eva Ayllón | Valeria Zapata | Thony Valencia | Lucy Young | Milena Warthon | Giani Méndez | Narda Pumarada |
| Eva Ayllón | Carmen Marina | Natasha Hernández | ~~Joseph Buitrón~~ | Alexis Pazos | Nicole La Rosa | Edú Alexander |
| Eva Ayllón | Carlos Ardiles | Bárbara Candiotti | Antonella Mendoza | La Mamba | Alan Ortíz | Giuseppe Horna |
| Eva Ayllón | Paloma Torres | Elliot Nima | Ciané Siverio | Luz Merly | Giselli Ramírez | Nicole Salas |
| Eva Ayllón | Beibel Flores | Berioska | Romina Noriega | Ivanova | Jean Soto | Carmen Castro |
Note: Italicized names are stolen artists (names scratched through within former teams).

== Week 1 ==
=== Blind auditions ===
The blind auditions started on 14 June 2021. New in this season, the "block" button is introduced; each coach has three buttons which they can press in order to prevent another coach from getting the artist on her/his team.

Blind auditions color key
| ✔ | Coach pressed "QUIERO TU VOZ" button |
| | Artist defaulted to a coach's team |
| | Artist elected this coach's team |
| | Artist was eliminated as no coach pressed the button |
| ✘ | Coach pressed the "QUIERO TU VOZ" button, but was blocked by Daniela getting the artist |
| ✘ | Coach pressed the "QUIERO TU VOZ" button, but was blocked by Guillermo from getting the artist |
| ✘ | Coach pressed the "QUIERO TU VOZ" button, but was blocked by Mike from getting the artist |
| ✘ | Coach pressed the "QUIERO TU VOZ" button, but was blocked by Eva from getting the artist |

Blind auditions' results
| Episode | Order | Artist | Age | Song | Coach's and artist's choices | | | |
| Episode | Order | Artist | Age | Song | Daniela | Guillermo | Mike | Eva |
|---|---|---|---|---|---|---|---|---|
| Episode 1 (Monday, 14 June) | 1 | Ayacuchana Luz Merly | 33 | "Flor De Retama" | ✔ | ✔ | ✔ | ✔ |
| Episode 1 (Monday, 14 June) | 2 | Ray BG | 29 | "Loco Por Volverte A Ver" | ✔ | ✔ | ✔ | ✔ |
| Episode 1 (Monday, 14 June) | 3 | Leonardo Navarro | — | "Ási Fue" | ✔ | ✔ | ✔ | ✔ |
| Episode 1 (Monday, 14 June) | 4 | Mafer Portugal | 19 | "Creo En Mi" | — | — | — | — |
| Episode 1 (Monday, 14 June) | 5 | Marcela Navarro | 33 | "Ángel" | ✔ | ✔ | — | ✔ |
| Episode 1 (Monday, 14 June) | 6 | Joaquina Carruitero | 18 | "I Have Nothing" | ✔ | ✔ | ✔ | ✔ |
| Episode 1 (Monday, 14 June) | 7 | La Mamba | 32 | "Saca las manos" | ✔ | ✔ | ✔ | ✔ |
| Episode 2 (Tuesday, 15 June) | 1 | Nicolle Manrique | 20 | "Mi Primera Rumba" | ✘ | ✔ | ✔ | ✔ |
| Episode 2 (Tuesday, 15 June) | 2 | Giselli Ramírez | 20 | "La Nueva Guardia" | ✔ | ✔ | ✔ | ✔ |
| Episode 2 (Tuesday, 15 June) | 3 | Made Vi | 27 | "El beso final" | — | — | — | — |
| Episode 2 (Tuesday, 15 June) | 4 | Noah Rodsick | 24 | "Maniac" | ✔ | — | — | — |
| Episode 2 (Tuesday, 15 June) | 5 | Juan Carlos Fiño | 27 | "La loca" | — | — | — | — |
| Episode 2 (Tuesday, 15 June) | 6 | Miluska Eskenazi | 30 | "En peligro de extinción" | ✔ | ✔ | — | — |
| Episode 2 (Tuesday, 15 June) | 7 | Carmen Marina | 20 | "Nostalgia" | ✔ | ✔ | ✔ | ✔ |
| Episode 3 (Wednesday, 16 June) | 1 | Carlos Ardiles | 52 | "Sincera confesión" | ✔ | ✔ | ✔ | ✔ |
| Episode 3 (Wednesday, 16 June) | 2 | Edu Baluarte | 20 | "Te quiero, te quiero" | ✔ | ✔ | ✔ | ✔ |
| Episode 3 (Wednesday, 16 June) | 3 | Karin Idol | 26 | "Zankoku na Tenshi no These" | — | ✔ | ✔ | — |
| Episode 3 (Wednesday, 16 June) | 4 | Nahomi Chavez | 24 | "Vivir así es morir de amor" | — | — | — | — |
| Episode 3 (Wednesday, 16 June) | 5 | Túpac "El Pitbull" | 29 | "Desahogo" | ✔ | ✔ | — | — |
| Episode 3 (Wednesday, 16 June) | 6 | Jean Paul Santa María | 32 | "Chica ideal" | — | ✔ | ✔ | — |
| Episode 3 (Wednesday, 16 June) | 7 | Giani Méndez | 31 | "Sobreviviré" | ✔ | ✔ | ✔ | ✔ |
| Episode 4 (Thursday, 17 June) | 1 | Carmen Castro | 35 | "De mi enamórate" | ✔ | ✔ | ✔ | ✔ |
| Episode 4 (Thursday, 17 June) | 2 | Cassiel | 28 | "Tienes la magia" | ― | ✔ | ✔ | ― |
| Episode 4 (Thursday, 17 June) | 3 | Sebastián Palma | 26 | "Gimme! Gimme! Gimme!" | ✔ | ✔ | ✔ | ― |
| Episode 4 (Thursday, 17 June) | 4 | Marian Díaz | 22 | "Volveré" | — | ✔ | — | — |
| Episode 4 (Thursday, 17 June) | 5 | Luis Alberto Quesquén | 23 | "Fabricando fantasías" | — | — | — | — |
| Episode 4 (Thursday, 17 June) | 6 | Lucy Young | 34 | "Almohada" | ✔ | ✔ | ✔ | ✔ |
| Episode 5 (Friday, 18 June) | 1 | Freddy Armas | 27 | "Historia de un amor" | ✔ | ✔ | ✔ | ✔ |
| Episode 5 (Friday, 18 June) | 2 | Cristhyan Guerrero | 34 | "Twist and shout" | — | — | — | — |
| Episode 5 (Friday, 18 June) | 3 | Camila Yesquén | 22 | "Corazón partío" | ✔ | ✔ | ✔ | — |
| Episode 5 (Friday, 18 June) | 4 | Iván MC | 34 | "Sentimiento original" | ✔ | ✔ | ✘ | ✔ |
| Episode 5 (Friday, 18 June) | 5 | Tito Jara | 54 | "Basta ya" | — | — | — | — |
| Episode 5 (Friday, 18 June) | 6 | Valeria Zapata | 17 | "Yo soy una mujer" | ✔ | — | — | ✔ |
| Episode 5 (Friday, 18 June) | 7 | Oriana Montero | 28 | "El triste" | ✔ | ✔ | ✔ | ✔ |
| Episode 6 (Saturday, 19 June) | 1 | Milena Warthon | 21 | "Suerte" | ✘ | ✔ | ✔ | ✔ |
| Episode 6 (Saturday, 19 June) | 2 | Ángel Rodríguez | 23 | "La quiero a morir" | — | — | — | — |
| Episode 6 (Saturday, 19 June) | 3 | Gonzalo Kujon | 19 | "Telepatía" | ✔ | ✔ | ✔ | ✔ |
| Episode 6 (Saturday, 19 June) | 4 | Víctor Díaz | 21 | "En ésta no" | ✔ | ✔ | — | — |
| Episode 6 (Saturday, 19 June) | 5 | Sebastián Tello | 21 | "Hoy" | — | ✔ | — | — |
| Episode 6 (Saturday, 19 June) | 6 | Elliot Nima | 20 | "Ingá" | — | — | — | ✔ |
| Episode 6 (Saturday, 19 June) | 7 | Lita Pezo | 20 | "Tormento" | — | — | — | — |
| Episode 6 (Saturday, 19 June) | 8 | Randy Feijoo | 32 | "Entrégate" | ✔ | ✔ | ✔ | ✔ |

== Week 2 ==
Blind auditions' results
| Episode | Order | Artist | Age | Song | Coach's and artist's choices | | | |
| Episode | Order | Artist | Age | Song | Daniela | Guillermo | Mike | Eva |
|---|---|---|---|---|---|---|---|---|
| Episode 7 (Monday, 21 June) | 1 | Jeyko Atoche | 25 | "El ritmo de mi corazón" | ✔ | ✔ | ✔ | ✔ |
| Episode 7 (Monday, 21 June) | 2 | Ivanova | 25 | "Rolling in the Deep" | — | — | — | ✔ |
| Episode 7 (Monday, 21 June) | 3 | Gustavo Barrios | 44 | "Hasta ayer" | — | — | — | — |
| Episode 7 (Monday, 21 June) | 4 | Zelka Sosa | 30 | "Duro y suave" | — | ✔ | ✘ | — |
| Episode 7 (Monday, 21 June) | 5 | Koko Rivas | 24 | "Amor eterno" | — | — | — | — |
| Episode 7 (Monday, 21 June) | 6 | Bárbara Candiotti | 26 | "I Will Always Love You" | ✔ | ✘ | ✔ | ✔ |
| Episode 8 (Tuesday, 22 June) | 1 | Aldair Sánchez | 25 | "Cariño bonito" | ✔ | ✔ | ✔ | — |
| Episode 8 (Tuesday, 22 June) | 2 | Daniela Ramírez | 25 | "Remember Me" | — | — | — | — |
| Episode 8 (Tuesday, 22 June) | 3 | Juan de Dios Valdivia | 24 | "Tú" | — | ✔ | — | — |
| Episode 8 (Tuesday, 22 June) | 4 | Marisella Valdivia | 34 | "Si tú eres mi hombre" | ✔ | — | — | — |
| Episode 8 (Tuesday, 22 June) | 5 | Sheyly Navarro | 27 | "Ave de cristal" | — | — | — | — |
| Episode 8 (Tuesday, 22 June) | 6 | Alex Vargas | 18 | "Labios compartidos" | — | ✔ | — | ✔ |
| Episode 8 (Tuesday, 22 June) | 7 | Joseph Buitrón | 29 | "Amigos con derechos" | ✔ | — | — | ✔ |
| Episode 9 (Wednesday, 23 June) | 1 | Jonn Barboza | 24 | "Cuando llora mi guitarra" | ✔ | — | ✘ | — |
| Episode 9 (Wednesday, 23 June) | 2 | Milagros Fernández | — | "Basta ya" | — | — | — | — |
| Episode 9 (Wednesday, 23 June) | 3 | Yessley Fonseca | 27 | "Wrecking Ball" | — | — | — | — |
| Episode 9 (Wednesday, 23 June) | 4 | Andrea Victoria | 23 | "La gloria de Dios" | — | — | ✔ | — |
| Episode 9 (Wednesday, 23 June) | 5 | Alessandro Justo | 28 | "Tu guardián" | — | — | — | — |
| Episode 9 (Wednesday, 23 June) | 6 | Ciané Siverio | 23 | "All of Me" | — | ✔ | — | ✔ |
| Episode 9 (Wednesday, 23 June) | 7 | Jova | 23 | "Ajena" | ✔ | ✔ | — | — |
| Episode 10 (Thursday, 24 June) | 1 | Lucero Koyama | 24 | "Sueños rotos" | ✔ | — | — | — |
| Episode 10 (Thursday, 24 June) | 2 | Ricardo Thiago | 45 | "Déjalos" | — | — | — | — |
| Episode 10 (Thursday, 24 June) | 3 | Shirley Iparraguirre | 35 | "Lo que son las cosas" | — | — | — | — |
| Episode 10 (Thursday, 24 June) | 4 | Carlos Aguilar | 25 | "Yo quería" | — | — | — | — |
| Episode 10 (Thursday, 24 June) | 5 | Paloma Torres | 23 | "Hoy tengo ganas de ti" | ✔ | ✔ | ✔ | ✔ |
| Episode 10 (Thursday, 24 June) | 6 | Daniela Zambrano | 31 | "Quiero que estés conmigo" | — | ✔ | — | ✔ |
| Episode 11 (Friday, 25 June) | 1 | Gabriela Balbás | 34 | "Mi soledad y yo" | ✘ | ✔ | ✔ | ✔ |
| Episode 11 (Friday, 25 June) | 2 | Jonathan Evaristo | 26 | "Será que no me amas" | — | ✔ | — | — |
| Episode 11 (Friday, 25 June) | 3 | Diego Trejo | 22 | "Valerie" | — | — | — | — |
| Episode 11 (Friday, 25 June) | 4 | Melissa Noblega | 29 | "La dueña soy yo" | ✔ | — | ✔ | — |
| Episode 11 (Friday, 25 June) | 5 | Allie García | 31 | "Perdón, Perdón" | — | — | — | — |
| Episode 11 (Friday, 25 June) | 6 | Paula Leonardi | 21 | "And I Am Telling You I'm Not Going" | ✔ | ✔ | ✔ | ✔ |
| Episode 12 (Saturday, 26 June) | 1 | Mariale Pineda | 25 | "Someone Like You" | ✔ | ✔ | — | — |
| Episode 12 (Saturday, 26 June) | 2 | Brandon Ayllón | 27 | "El aventurero" | — | — | — | — |
| Episode 12 (Saturday, 26 June) | 3 | Fabiola Núñez | 26 | "Oye" | — | — | — | — |
| Episode 12 (Saturday, 26 June) | 4 | Maru Silva | 27 | "Viveme" | — | ✔ | ✔ | — |
| Episode 12 (Saturday, 26 June) | 5 | Junior Riojas | 36 | "Hawái" | — | — | — | — |
| Episode 12 (Saturday, 26 June) | 6 | Pamela Osorio | 20 | "Como yo nadie te ha amado" | — | ✔ | — | — |
| Episode 12 (Saturday, 26 June) | 7 | Daniel Oliveira | 28 | "Solo otra vez" | — | — | — | — |
| Episode 12 (Saturday, 26 June) | 8 | Tony Silva | 35 | "Con los años que me quedan" | ✔ | — | — | — |
| Episode 12 (Saturday, 26 June) | 9 | Stefano Grande | 20 | "En cambio no" | ✔ | ✔ | ✔ | ✔ |

== Week 3 ==
Blind auditions' results
| Episode | Order | Artist | Age | Song | Coach's and artist's choices | | | |
| Episode | Order | Artist | Age | Song | Daniela | Guillermo | Mike | Eva |
|---|---|---|---|---|---|---|---|---|
| Episode 13 (Monday, 28 June) | 1 | Isa Rondón | 30 | "Sweet Child O' Mine" | ✔ | ✔ | ✔ | ✔ |
| Episode 13 (Monday, 28 June) | 2 | Carlomartin Espinoza | 25 | "Que somos amantes" | — | — | — | — |
| Episode 13 (Monday, 28 June) | 3 | Andreina Montilla | 21 | "Sueños rotos" | — | — | — | — |
| Episode 13 (Monday, 28 June) | 4 | Pedro Crisanto | 20 | "Vivir sin ella" | — | — | ✔ | — |
| Episode 13 (Monday, 28 June) | 5 | Karla Ybañez | 18 | "Todo por nada" | — | — | — | — |
| Episode 13 (Monday, 28 June) | 6 | Nicole Salas | 20 | "La Llorona" | ✔ | ✔ | — | ✔ |
| Episode 13 (Monday, 28 June) | 7 | Brandymar Camacho | 21 | "Qué bonito" | ✔ | ✔ | ✔ | ✔ |
| Episode 14 (Tuesday, 29 June) | 1 | Nia Carpio | 18 | "Contigo aprendí" | ✔ | ✔ | ✔ | ✔ |
| Episode 14 (Tuesday, 29 June) | 2 | Fiorella Berríos | 27 | "Como una rosa roja" | — | — | — | — |
| Episode 14 (Tuesday, 29 June) | 3 | Cristina López | 24 | "Hoy" | — | — | — | — |
| Episode 14 (Tuesday, 29 June) | 4 | Bryan Avilés | 25 | "El Triste" | ✔ | — | — | — |
| Episode 14 (Tuesday, 29 June) | 5 | David Chávez | 32 | "Cómo olvidar" | — | — | — | — |
| Episode 14 (Tuesday, 29 June) | 6 | Nella Francis | 32 | "Un beso a medias" | ✔ | ✔ | — | — |
| Episode 14 (Tuesday, 29 June) | 7 | Antonella Mendoza | 22 | "Raíces del festejo" | — | — | — | ✔ |
| Episode 15 (Wednesday, 30 June) | 1 | Alejandra Urcia | 22 | "Shallow" | — | — | — | — |
| Episode 15 (Wednesday, 30 June) | 2 | Fabiola Cruzado | 35 | "Evidencias" | ✔ | — | ✔ | ✔ |
| Episode 15 (Wednesday, 30 June) | 3 | Alberto Díaz | 28 | "Abrázame" | — | — | — | — |
| Episode 15 (Wednesday, 30 June) | 4 | Fiorella Hidalgo | 23 | "Hit the Road Jack" | ✔ | ✔ | — | — |
| Episode 15 (Wednesday, 30 June) | 5 | Génesis Poveda | 27 | "Mi buen amor" | — | — | — | — |
| Episode 15 (Wednesday, 30 June) | 6 | Emanuel Rivera | 25 | "La flor de la canela" | — | ✔ | — | — |
| Episode 15 (Wednesday, 30 June) | 7 | Giuseppe Horna | 23 | "Contigo en la Distancia" | ✔ | ✔ | ✔ | ✔ |
| Episode 16 (Thursday, 1 July) | 1 | Joselin Barrantes | 21 | "El Triste" | — | ✔ | — | — |
| Episode 16 (Thursday, 1 July) | 2 | Miguel Hernández | 19 | "Un buen perdedor" | — | — | — | — |
| Episode 16 (Thursday, 1 July) | 3 | Alan Ortíz | 38 | "No me conoces" | — | — | — | ✔ |
| Episode 16 (Thursday, 1 July) | 4 | Mhaciel Moreno | 16 | "Como una rosa roja" | — | — | — | — |
| Episode 16 (Thursday, 1 July) | 5 | Yersson Andrés | 23 | "Como quien pierde una estrella" | — | — | — | — |
| Episode 16 (Thursday, 1 July) | 6 | Grace Morales | 23 | "Sin Ti" | ✔ | ✔ | ✔ | ✔ |
| Episode 16 (Thursday, 1 July) | 7 | Maroa | 19 | "Yo te extrañaré" | — | ✔ | ✔ | ✔ |
| Episode 17 (Friday, 2 July) | 1 | Amanda Ortiz | 22 | "Señor mentira" | ✘ | ✔ | ✔ | — |
| Episode 17 (Friday, 2 July) | 2 | Madeleine Manrique | 35 | "Titanium" | — | — | — | — |
| Episode 17 (Friday, 2 July) | 3 | Julio Cornejo | 44 | "Como un burro amarrado" | ✔ | — | — | — |
| Episode 17 (Friday, 2 July) | 4 | Renzo Montenegro | 29 | "Me enamore de ti y que" | — | — | — | – |
| Episode 17 (Friday, 2 July) | 5 | Beibel Flores | 23 | "Líbido" | ✔ | — | — | ✔ |
| Episode 17 (Friday, 2 July) | 6 | Briyid Ore | 19 | "Antes de ti" | — | — | — | — |
| Episode 17 (Friday, 2 July) | 7 | Fernando Alcalde | 51 | "Ojalá" | ✔ | ✔ | ✔ | ✘ |
| Episode 18 (Saturday, 3 July) | 1 | Nash Moreno | 26 | "Olvídala Amigo" | — | — | — | — |
| Episode 18 (Saturday, 3 July) | 2 | Gabriela More | 23 | "Ex de Verdad" | — | ✔ | — | — |
| Episode 18 (Saturday, 3 July) | 3 | Anabel Vizcarra | 17 | "Chandelier" | — | — | — | — |
| Episode 18 (Saturday, 3 July) | 4 | Jannis Knight | 27 | "Entre la espada y la pared" | — | — | ✔ | — |
| Episode 18 (Saturday, 3 July) | 5 | Daniel Torres | 21 | "You Know I'm No Good" | — | — | — | — |
| Episode 18 (Saturday, 3 July) | 6 | Namiko Raymondi | 25 | "Antología" | — | — | — | — |
| Episode 18 (Saturday, 3 July) | 7 | Mafe Angulo | 25 | "Feeling Good" | — | — | — | — |
| Episode 18 (Saturday, 3 July) | 8 | Javo | 29 | "Tu falta de querer" | ✔ | ✔ | ✔ | ✔ |
| Episode 18 (Saturday, 3 July) | 9 | Narda Pumarada | 22 | "Regresa" | ✔ | ✔ | ✔ | ✔ |

== Week 4 ==
Blind auditions' results
| Episode | Order | Artist | Age | Song | Coach's and artist's choices | | | |
| Episode | Order | Artist | Age | Song | Daniela | Guillermo | Mike | Eva |
|---|---|---|---|---|---|---|---|---|
| Episode 19 (Monday, 5 July) | 1 | Sebastian Mahle | 27 | "Show Me How to Live" | — | ✔ | — | — |
| Episode 19 (Monday, 5 July) | 2 | Jonathan Sanes | 37 | "Fuego de noche, nieve de día" | ✔ | ✔ | ✔ | ✔ |
| Episode 19 (Monday, 5 July) | 3 | Branko Peñafiel | 28 | "Me va a extrañar" | — | — | — | — |
| Episode 19 (Monday, 5 July) | 4 | Rubismar Matute | 24 | "Mi buen amor" | — | — | — | — |
| Episode 19 (Monday, 5 July) | 5 | Nicole La Rosa | 20 | "Hallelujah" | ✔ | ✔ | ✔ | ✔ |
| Episode 19 (Monday, 5 July) | 6 | Andrea Alvarado | 27 | "Si Una Vez" | — | — | — | — |
| Episode 19 (Monday, 5 July) | 7 | Phano Rivera | 20 | "Pecadora" | ✔ | ✔ | ✔ | — |
| Episode 20 (Tuesday, 6 July) | 1 | Jean Soto | 24 | "Eres Mi Sueño" | — | — | — | ✔ |
| Episode 20 (Tuesday, 6 July) | 2 | Fer Fasanando | 32 | "Noelia" | — | — | — | — |
| Episode 20 (Tuesday, 6 July) | 3 | Ana Olórtegui | 34 | "Mi reflejo" | — | — | ✔ | — |
| Episode 20 (Tuesday, 6 July) | 4 | Ian Portal | 32 | "Si no es contigo" | — | — | — | — |
| Episode 20 (Tuesday, 6 July) | 5 | Coralie Mestanza | 26 | "Bang Bang" | ✔ | ✔ | ✔ | ✔ |
| Episode 21 (Wednesday, 7 July) | 1 | Anita Molina | 27 | "Parte de él" | — | ✔ | — | — |
| Episode 21 (Wednesday, 7 July) | 2 | Nick Bryan | 24 | "Tan enamorados" | — | — | — | — |
| Episode 21 (Wednesday, 7 July) | 3 | Néstor Mugruza | 35 | "Te quiero" | ✔ | — | — | — |
| Episode 21 (Wednesday, 7 July) | 4 | Sandra Rojas | 44 | "Tu falta de querer" | — | — | — | — |
| Episode 21 (Wednesday, 7 July) | 5 | Yllen Ramínez | 24 | "Girl on Fire" | — | — | — | — |
| Episode 21 (Wednesday, 7 July) | 6 | Daniela Prado | 22 | "Tren del cielo" | — | ✔ | — | — |
| Episode 21 (Wednesday, 7 July) | 7 | Romina Noriega | 26 | "El sol no regresa" | — | ✘ | — | ✔ |
| Episode 22 (Thursday, 8 July) | 1 | Luis Ángel Burgos | 30 | "Yo te pido amor" | — | — | — | — |
| Episode 22 (Thursday, 8 July) | 2 | Thony Valencia | 26 | "¿Y cómo es él?" | ✔ | ✔ | ✔ | ✔ |
| Episode 22 (Thursday, 8 July) | 3 | Gadiel Mestanza | 25 | "Angels" | — | — | — | — |
| Episode 22 (Thursday, 8 July) | 4 | Jesús Zaez | 24 | "Échame a mí la culpa" | — | — | ✔ | — |
| Episode 22 (Thursday, 8 July) | 5 | Cristhofer Sandiga | 20 | "Mi historia entre tus dedos" | — | — | — | — |
| Episode 22 (Thursday, 8 July) | 6 | Analau | 28 | "Something's Got a Hold on Me" | — | ✔ | — | ✔ |
| Episode 22 (Thursday, 8 July) | 7 | Berioska | 30 | "Blue Bird" | ✔ | ✔ | ✔ | ✔ |
| Episode 23 (Friday, 9 July) | 1 | Nevenka Maksimovic | 19 | "Quédate" | — | — | — | — |
| Episode 23 (Friday, 9 July) | 2 | Sofía Ayte | 24 | "Creo en mí" | — | — | — | — |
| Episode 23 (Friday, 9 July) | 3 | Henry Delgado | 28 | "Someone Like You" | — | ✔ | — | — |
| Episode 23 (Friday, 9 July) | 4 | Jesús Torres | 23 | "Cuando te enamoras" | — | — | — | — |
| Episode 23 (Friday, 9 July) | 5 | Diego Cárdenas | 26 | "Sin Ti" | — | — | — | — |
| Episode 23 (Friday, 9 July) | 6 | Daniela Torres | 22 | "Amor Completo" | — | — | — | — |
| Episode 23 (Friday, 9 July) | 7 | Eva Nerea | 21 | "Cuando llegue la hora" | — | — | ✔ | — |
| Episode 24 (Saturday, 10 July) | 1 | Luis Román | 35 | "Mi soledad y yo" | ✔ | — | — | — |
| Episode 24 (Saturday, 10 July) | 2 | Vanessa Vásquez | 19 | "Nadie Te Amará Como Yo" | — | ✔ | — | — |
| Episode 24 (Saturday, 10 July) | 3 | Fidelius | 36 | "Será" | — | — | ✔ | — |
| Episode 24 (Saturday, 10 July) | 4 | Marisol Anicama | 24 | "Quiero que estés conmigo" | — | — | — | — |
| Episode 24 (Saturday, 10 July) | 5 | Lucas Fonseca | 21 | "La copa rota" | — | ✔ | — | — |
| Episode 24 (Saturday, 10 July) | 6 | Julinho Donayre | 25 | "Sería fácil" | — | — | — | — |
| Episode 24 (Saturday, 10 July) | 7 | Jair Montaño | 20 | "Desesperado" | ✔ | ✔ | ✔ | ✔ |
| Episode 24 (Saturday, 10 July) | 8 | María Fernanda Teves | 17 | "Hello" | — | — | — | — |
| Episode 24 (Saturday, 10 July) | 9 | Fito Flores | 36 | "The Final Countdown" | ✔ | ✔ | ✘ | ✔ |

== Week 5 ==
=== Last blind auditions ===
Blind auditions' results
| Episode | Order | Artist | Age | Song | Coach's and artist's choices | | | |
| Episode | Order | Artist | Age | Song | Daniela | Guillermo | Mike | Eva |
|---|---|---|---|---|---|---|---|---|
| Episode 25 (Monday, 12 July) | 1 | Tamara Cueto | 29 | "A Dios sea la gloria" | — | — | — | — |
| Episode 25 (Monday, 12 July) | 2 | Natasha Hernández | 21 | "Por qué me fui a enamorar de ti" | ✔ | — | — | — |
| Episode 25 (Monday, 12 July) | 3 | Yvonne Valcárcel | 23 | "Hiriéndote" | — | — | — | — |
| Episode 25 (Monday, 12 July) | 4 | Michelle Castro | 22 | "Havana" | — | ✔ | — | — |
| Episode 25 (Monday, 12 July) | 5 | Braulio Paredes | 26 | "Hasta que vuelvas conmigo" | — | — | — | — |
| Episode 25 (Monday, 12 July) | 6 | Esmeralda Díaz | 19 | "Si Tú Eres Mi Hombre" | — | — | ✔ | — |
| Episode 25 (Monday, 12 July) | 7 | Alexis Pazos | 24 | "Desesperadamente enamorado" | ✔ | ✔ | ✔ | ✔ |
| Episode 26 (Tuesday, 13 July) | 1 | Edú Alexander | 29 | "Y hubo alguien" | — | ✔ | ✔ | ✔ |
| Episode 26 (Tuesday, 13 July) | 2 | Jherly Saldaña | 30 | "Yo te pido amor" | — | — | — | — |
| Episode 26 (Tuesday, 13 July) | 3 | Sebastián Morillas | 20 | "Thinking Out Loud" | ✔ | ✔ | ✔ | — |
| Episode 26 (Tuesday, 13 July) | 4 | Kelly Aliaga | 18 | "Somewhere Over the Rainbow" | — | — | — | — |
| Episode 26 (Tuesday, 13 July) | 5 | Mavelaz | 19 | "Chachachá" | — | — | — | — |
| Episode 26 (Tuesday, 13 July) | 6 | Jean Paul Moreno | 24 | "Juraré no amarte más" | ✔ | ✔ | ✔ | ✔ |
| Episode 26 (Tuesday, 13 July) | 7 | Mariel Iannello | 20 | "Fallin'" | — | — | — | — |
| Episode 26 (Tuesday, 13 July) | 8 | Rony Merino | 24 | "Volver a amar" | ✔ | ✔ | ✔ | ✔ |

- Note: At the end of the blind auditions, Daniela did not use her third block.

=== Battles ===
The battles round started on 14 July. This season's advisors were: Christian Yaipén for Team Eva, Danny Ocean for Team Mike, Mauri Stern for Team Guillermo, and Tito Nieves for Team Daniela. Meanwhile, unlike previous seasons, the 'steals' on the battles were removed this season. Contestants who win their battle advance to the knockouts.

Battles color key
| Artist won the Battle and advanced to the Knockouts |
| Artist lost the Battle and was eliminated |

Battles' results
| Episode | Order | Coach | Winner | Song | Loser |
|---|---|---|---|---|---|
| Episode 27 (Wednesday, 14 July) | 1 | Eva | Giani Méndez | "Brujería" | Jean Soto |
| Episode 27 (Wednesday, 14 July) | 2 | Daniela | Sebastián Palma | "Livin' on a Prayer" | Noah Rodsick |
| Episode 27 (Wednesday, 14 July) | 3 | Mike | Pedro Crisanto | "Que somos amantes" | Eva Nerea |
| Episode 27 (Wednesday, 14 July) | 4 | Guillermo | Sebastián Tello | "Un mundo ideal" | Anita Molina |
| Episode 27 (Wednesday, 14 July) | 5 | Eva | Lucy Young | "Mi propiedad privada" | Ivanova |
| Episode 28 (Thursday, 15 July) | 1 | Mike | Karin Idol | "Todos me miran" | Esmeralda Díaz |
| Episode 28 (Thursday, 15 July) | 2 | Eva | Edú Alexander | "No me ames" | Romina Noriega |
| Episode 28 (Thursday, 15 July) | 3 | Guillermo | Marcela Navarro | "Culpable o no" | Nella Francis |
| Episode 28 (Thursday, 15 July) | 4 | Daniela | Iván MC | "Mal bicho" | Túpac "El Pitbull" |
| Episode 29 (Friday, 16 July) | 1 | Eva | Barbara Candiotti | "Un día sin ti" | Berioska |
| Episode 29 (Friday, 16 July) | 2 | Daniela | Aldair Sánchez | "Inolvidable" | Jova |
| Episode 29 (Friday, 16 July) | 3 | Guillermo | Miluska Eskenazi | "Vamos a escapar" | Jonathan Evaristo |
| Episode 29 (Friday, 16 July) | 4 | Mike | Jeyko Atoche | "Tu recuerdo" | Maru Silva |
| Episode 29 (Friday, 16 July) | 5 | Daniela | Tony Silva | "Qué alguien me diga" | Julio Cornejo |
| Episode 30 (Saturday, 17 July) | 1 | Mike | Stefano Grande | "Arrasando" | Ana Olórtegui |
| Episode 30 (Saturday, 17 July) | 2 | Guillermo | Fernando Alcalde | "Perdón" | Joselin Barrantes |
| Episode 30 (Saturday, 17 July) | 3 | Eva | Nicole La Rosa | "Don't Stop Me Now" | Beibel Flores |
| Episode 30 (Saturday, 17 July) | 4 | Daniela | Marisella Valdivia | "Amiga mía" | Brandymar Camacho |
| Episode 30 (Saturday, 17 July) | 5 | Mike | Maroa | "Amantes" | Ray BG |

== Week 6 ==
Battles' results
| Episode | Order | Coach | Winner | Song | Loser |
|---|---|---|---|---|---|
| Episode 31 (Monday, 19 July) | 1 | Mike | Leonardo Navarro | "Por que ésta hembra no llora" | Amanda Ortiz |
| Episode 31 (Monday, 19 July) | 2 | Guillermo | Sebastian Mahle | "Are You Gonna Go My Way" | Henry Delgado |
| Episode 31 (Monday, 19 July) | 3 | Eva | Milena Warthon | "Hasta la raíz" | Nicole Salas |
| Episode 31 (Monday, 19 July) | 4 | Daniela | Joaquina Carruitero | "Ya no más" | Melissa Noblega |
| Episode 32 (Tuesday, 20 July) | 1 | Daniela | Freddy Armas | "Y llegaste tú" | Víctor Díaz |
| Episode 32 (Tuesday, 20 July) | 2 | Guillermo | Zelka Sosa | "Miénteme" | Vanessa Vásquez |
| Episode 32 (Tuesday, 20 July) | 3 | Eva | Antonella Mendoza | "Mal Paso" | Giselli Ramírez |
| Episode 32 (Tuesday, 20 July) | 4 | Guillermo | Edu Baluarte | "Tesoro mío" | Marian Díaz |
| Episode 32 (Tuesday, 20 July) | 5 | Mike | Randy Feijoo | "Si me tenías" | Gabriela Balbás |
| Episode 33 (Wednesday, 21 July) | 1 | Eva | Carmen Marina | "Lejos De Ti" | Luz Merly |
| Episode 33 (Wednesday, 21 July) | 2 | Daniela | Bryan Avilés | "Bésame" | Fiorella Hidalgo |
| Episode 33 (Wednesday, 21 July) | 3 | Mike | Gonzalo Kujon | "Qué vida la mía" | Phano Rivera |
| Episode 33 (Wednesday, 21 July) | 4 | Guillermo | Daniela Prado | "Dime si esto es amor" | Gabriela More |
| Episode 33 (Wednesday, 21 July) | 5 | Eva | Thony Valencia | "Lo mejor de mi vida eres tú" | Ciané Siverio |
| Episode 34 (Thursday, 22 July) | 1 | Daniela | Grace Morales | "Recuérdame" | Jonn Barboza |
| Episode 34 (Thursday, 22 July) | 2 | Guillermo | Jean Paul Moreno | "Guapa" | Juan de Dios Valdivia |
| Episode 34 (Thursday, 22 July) | 3 | Eva | Carlos Ardiles | "Callejón de un solo caño" | Elliot Nima |
| Episode 34 (Thursday, 22 July) | 4 | Mike | Paula Leonardi | "Born This Way" | Camila Yesquén |
| Episode 35 (Friday, 23 July) | 1 | Eva | Valeria Zapata | "Perdóname" | Paloma Torres |
| Episode 35 (Friday, 23 July) | 2 | Daniela | Mariale Pineda | "22" | Coralie Mestanza |
| Episode 35 (Friday, 23 July) | 3 | Mike | Nia Carpio | "El listón de tu pelo" | Fidelius |
| Episode 35 (Friday, 23 July) | 4 | Guillermo | Oriana Montero | "Así no te amará jamás" | Daniela Zambrano |
| Episode 36 (Saturday, 24 July) | 1 | Eva | Joseph Buitrón | "Llorarás" | Giuseppe Horna |
| Episode 36 (Saturday, 24 July) | 2 | Guillermo | Lucas Fonseca | "Traicionera" | Michelle Castro |
| Episode 36 (Saturday, 24 July) | 3 | Daniela | Jair Montaño | "Llorar" | Lucero Koyama |
| Episode 36 (Saturday, 24 July) | 4 | Mike | Fabiola Cruzado | "Cuando Te Besé" | Jean Paul Santa María |
| Episode 36 (Saturday, 24 July) | 5 | Guillermo | Fito Flores | "Vivo por ella" | Isa Rondón |

== Week 7 ==
=== Last battles ===
Battles' results
| Episode | Order | Coach | Winner | Song | Loser |
|---|---|---|---|---|---|
| Episode 37 (Monday, 26 July) | 1 | Daniela | Jonathan Sanes | "No Te Contaron Mal" | Luis Román |
| Episode 37 (Monday, 26 July) | 2 | Eva | Alexis Pazos | "Me cambiaste la vida" | Alan Ortíz |
| Episode 37 (Monday, 26 July) | 3 | Guillermo | Emanuel Rivera | "Sueños" | Analau |
| Episode 37 (Monday, 26 July) | 4 | Mike | Sebastián Morillas | "Sin miedo a nada" | Andrea Victoria |
| Episode 37 (Monday, 26 July) | 5 | Daniela | Natasha Hernández | "Hipocresía" | Rony Merino |
| Episode 38 (Tuesday, 27 July) | 1 | Mike | Jesús Zaez | "Fruta fresca" | Cassiel |
| Episode 38 (Tuesday, 27 July) | 2 | Daniela | Javo | "Y es que sucede así" | Néstor Mugruza |
| Episode 38 (Tuesday, 27 July) | 3 | Guillermo | Alex Vargas | "Espacio sideral" | Pamela Osorio |
| Episode 38 (Tuesday, 27 July) | 4 | Mike | Nicolle Manrique | "Adiós amor" | Jannis Knight |
| Episode 38 (Tuesday, 27 July) | 5 | Eva | Narda Pumarada | "Ritmo, color y sabor" | La Mamba |

=== Knockouts ===
The knockouts round started on 28 July. In this round, coaches were able to steal one losing artist from another team. Contestants who win their knockout or get stolen advance to the Live shows.

Knockouts color key
| Artist won the Knockout and advanced to the Live shows |
| Artist lost the Knockout but was stolen by another coach and advanced to the Live shows |
| Artist lost the Knockout and was eliminated |

Knockouts' results
| Episode | Order | Coach | Song | Winner | Loser | Song | 'Steal' result | | | |
| Episode | Order | Coach | Song | Winner | Loser | Song | Daniela | Guille | Mike | Eva |
|---|---|---|---|---|---|---|---|---|---|---|
| Episode 39 (Wednesday, 28 July) | 1 | Daniela | "Historia de un amor" | Freddy Armas | Jonathan Sanes | "Fuego de noche, nieve de día" | —N/a | — | — | — |
| Episode 39 (Wednesday, 28 July) | 2 | Mike | "Zankoku na Tenshi no These" | Karin Idol | Sebastián Morillas | "Thinking Out Loud" | — | — | —N/a | — |
| Episode 39 (Wednesday, 28 July) | 3 | Guillermo | "La flor de la canela" | Emanuel Rivera | Jean Paul Moreno | "Juraré no amarte más" | ✔ | —N/a | — | — |
| Episode 39 (Wednesday, 28 July) | 4 | Eva | "Nostalgia" | Carmen Marina | Antonella Mendoza | "Raíces del festejo" | | — | — | —N/a |
| Episode 40 (Friday, 30 July) | 1 | Eva | "Almohada" | Lucy Young | Bárbara Candiotti | "I Will Always Love You" | Team full | — | — | —N/a |
| Episode 40 (Friday, 30 July) | 2 | Mike | "Échame a mí la culpa" | Jesús Zaez | Nia Carpio | "Contigo aprendí" | Team full | — | —N/a | — |
| Episode 40 (Friday, 30 July) | 3 | Guillermo | "Ángel" | Marcela Navarro | Daniela Prado | "Tren del cielo" | Team full | —N/a | — | — |
| Episode 40 (Friday, 30 July) | 4 | Daniela | "Tu falta de querer" | Javo | Mariale Pineda | "Someone Like You" | Team full | — | — | — |
| Episode 40 (Friday, 30 July) | 5 | Eva | "Sobreviviré" | Giani Méndez | Joseph Buitrón | "Amigos con derechos" | Team full | ✔ | — | —N/a |
| Episode 41 (Saturday, 31 July) | 1 | Mike | "And I Am Telling You I'm Not Going" | Paula Leonardi | Fabiola Cruzado | "Evidencias" | Team full | Team full | —N/a | — |
| Episode 41 (Saturday, 31 July) | 2 | Eva | "Yo soy una mujer" | Valeria Zapata | Carlos Ardiles | "Sincera confesión" | Team full | Team full | — | —N/a |
| Episode 41 (Saturday, 31 July) | 3 | Guillermo | "Te quiero, te quiero" | Edu Baluarte | Alex Vargas | "Labios compartidos" | Team full | Team full | — | — |
| Episode 41 (Saturday, 31 July) | 4 | Mike | "El ritmo de mi corazón" | Jeyko Atoche | Maroa | "Yo te extrañaré" | Team full | Team full | —N/a | — |
| Episode 41 (Saturday, 31 July) | 5 | Daniela | "Gimme! Gimme! Gimme!" | Sebastián Palma | Bryan Avilés | "El Triste" | Team full | Team full | — | — |

== Week 8 ==
=== Last knockouts ===
Knockouts' results
| Episode | Order | Coach | Song | Winner | Loser | Song | 'Steal' result | | | |
| Episode | Order | Coach | Song | Winner | Loser | Song | Daniela | Guille | Mike | Eva |
|---|---|---|---|---|---|---|---|---|---|---|
| Episode 42 (Monday, 2 August) | 1 | Eva | "Suerte" | Milena Warthon | Edú Alexander | "Y hubo alguien" | Team full | Team full | — | —N/a |
| Episode 42 (Monday, 2 August) | 2 | Daniela | "Sin Ti" | Grace Morales | Tony Silva | "Con Los Años Que Me Quedan" | Team full | Team full | — | — |
| Episode 42 (Monday, 2 August) | 3 | Mike | "Mi Primera Rumba" | Nicolle Manrique | Pedro Crisanto | "Vivir sin Ella" | Team full | Team full | —N/a | — |
| Episode 42 (Monday, 2 August) | 4 | Guillermo | "El triste" | Oriana Montero | Fernando Alcalde | "Ojalá" | Team full | Team full | — | — |
| Episode 43 (Tuesday, 3 August) | 1 | Daniela | "Cariño bonito" | Aldair Sánchez | Iván MC | "Sentimiento original" | Team full | Team full | ✔ | — |
| Episode 43 (Tuesday, 3 August) | 2 | Mike | "En cambio no" | Stefano Grande | Gonzalo Kujon | "Telepatía" | Team full | Team full | Team full | — |
| Episode 43 (Tuesday, 3 August) | 3 | Guillermo | "Show Me How to Live" | Sebastian Mahle | Sebastián Tello | "Hoy" | Team full | Team full | Team full | — |
| Episode 43 (Tuesday, 3 August) | 4 | Daniela | "Desesperado" | Jair Montaño | Marisella Valdivia | "Si tú eres mi hombre" | Team full | Team full | Team full | — |
| Episode 43 (Tuesday, 3 August) | 5 | Eva | "Regresa" | Narda Pumarada | Nicole La Rosa | "Hallelujah" | Team full | Team full | Team full | — |
| Episode 44 (Wednesday, 4 August) | 1 | Mike | "Entrégate" | Randy Feijoo | Leonardo Navarro | "Ási Fue" | Team full | Team full | Team full | — |
| Episode 44 (Wednesday, 4 August) | 2 | Guillermo | "En peligro de extinción" | Miluska Eskenazi | Zelka Sosa | "Duro y suave" | Team full | Team full | Team full | — |
| Episode 44 (Wednesday, 4 August) | 3 | Eva | "¿Y cómo es él?" | Thony Valencia | Alexis Pazos | "Desesperadamente enamorado" | Team full | Team full | Team full | —N/a |
| Episode 44 (Wednesday, 4 August) | 4 | Guillermo | "The Final Countdown" | Fito Flores | Lucas Fonseca | "La copa rota" | Team full | Team full | Team full | — |
| Episode 44 (Wednesday, 4 August) | 5 | Daniela | "I Have Nothing" | Joaquina Carruitero | Natasha Hernández | "Por qué me fui a enamorar de ti" | Team full | Team full | Team full | ✔ |

=== Live round of 32 (part one) ===
The live shows began airing on 5 August, with the round of 32. This phase has two parts, each one with three nights of performances. The coaches divide their eight-members team into two groups of four, with one group of each team performing in a part. A team group performs in one of the first two nights. Per team, one artist is saved by the public and other is saved by their respective coach. On night three (elimination night), the remaining two artists per team perform, and the one with most votes from the public advances to the next round.

Live shows color key
| Artist was saved by public's vote |
| Artist was saved by her/his coach |
| Artist placed in the bottom two |
| Artist was eliminated |

Round of 32 (part one) results
| Episode | Order | Coach | Contestant | Song | Result |
|---|---|---|---|---|---|
| Episode 45 (Thursday, 5 August) | 1 | Mike Bahía | Iván MC | "Corazón" | Bottom two |
| Episode 45 (Thursday, 5 August) | 2 | Mike Bahía | Nicolle Manrique | "Y hubo alguien" | Mike's choice |
| Episode 45 (Thursday, 5 August) | 3 | Mike Bahía | Jeyko Atoche | "Te quiero" | Public's vote |
| Episode 45 (Thursday, 5 August) | 4 | Mike Bahía | Paula Leonardi | "Por siempre tú" | Bottom two |
| Episode 45 (Thursday, 5 August) | 5 | Eva Ayllón | Narda Pumarada | "Que somos amantes" | Eva's choice |
| Episode 45 (Thursday, 5 August) | 6 | Eva Ayllón | Natasha Hernández | "El hombre que yo amo" | Bottom two |
| Episode 45 (Thursday, 5 August) | 7 | Eva Ayllón | Giani Méndez | "A mi Dios todo le debo" | Bottom two |
| Episode 45 (Thursday, 5 August) | 8 | Eva Ayllón | Milena Warthon | "Valicha" | Public's vote |
| Episode 46 (Friday, 6 August) | 1 | Daniela Darcourt | Jair Montaño | "Me está quemando el alma" / "Salvemos nuestro amor" | Bottom two |
| Episode 46 (Friday, 6 August) | 2 | Daniela Darcourt | Jean Paul Moreno | "Tocando Fondo" | Bottom two |
| Episode 46 (Friday, 6 August) | 3 | Daniela Darcourt | Grace Morales | "Fallin'" | Daniela's choice |
| Episode 46 (Friday, 6 August) | 4 | Daniela Darcourt | Aldair Sánchez | "Cruel condena" | Public's vote |
| Episode 46 (Friday, 6 August) | 5 | Guillermo Dávila | Edu Baluarte | "Parte de este juego" | Public's vote |
| Episode 46 (Friday, 6 August) | 6 | Guillermo Dávila | Fito Flores | "I'm Always Here" | Bottom two |
| Episode 46 (Friday, 6 August) | 7 | Guillermo Dávila | Joseph Buitrón | "Que alguien me diga" | Bottom two |
| Episode 46 (Friday, 6 August) | 8 | Guillermo Dávila | Marcela Navarro | "A medio vivir" | Guillermo's choice |
| Episode 47 (Saturday, 7 August) | 1 | Guillermo Dávila | Joseph Buitrón | "Yo quisiera" | Eliminated |
| Episode 47 (Saturday, 7 August) | 2 | Guillermo Dávila | Fito Flores | "Culpable o no" | Public's vote |
| Episode 47 (Saturday, 7 August) | 3 | Daniela Darcourt | Jair Montaño | "Te lo pido por favor" | Public's vote |
| Episode 47 (Saturday, 7 August) | 4 | Daniela Darcourt | Jean Paul Moreno | "Lloviendo estrellas" | Eliminated |
| Episode 47 (Saturday, 7 August) | 5 | Mike Bahía | Iván MC | "Trátame suavemente" | Public's vote |
| Episode 47 (Saturday, 7 August) | 6 | Mike Bahía | Paula Leonardi | "Roxanne" | Eliminated |
| Episode 47 (Saturday, 7 August) | 7 | Eva Ayllón | Natasha Hernández | "Contigo aprendí" | Eliminated |
| Episode 47 (Saturday, 7 August) | 8 | Eva Ayllón | Giani Méndez | "La gata bajo la lluvia" | Public's vote |

Non-competition performances
| Order | Artists | Song |
|---|---|---|
| 46.1 | Guillermo and his team (Edu, Fito, Joseph, and Marcela) | "Mamita, ábreme la puerta" |

== Week 9 ==
=== Live round of 32 (part two) ===
Round of 32 (part two) results
| Episode | Order | Coach | Contestant | Song | Result |
|---|---|---|---|---|---|
| Episode 48 (Monday, 9 August) | 1 | Eva Ayllón | Lucy Young | "Costumbres" | Bottom two |
| Episode 48 (Monday, 9 August) | 2 | Eva Ayllón | Carmen Marina | "El Perú nació serrano" | Bottom two |
| Episode 48 (Monday, 9 August) | 3 | Eva Ayllón | Thony Valencia | "Yo quería" | Eva's choice |
| Episode 48 (Monday, 9 August) | 4 | Eva Ayllón | Valeria Zapata | "Antes de Ti" | Public's vote |
| Episode 48 (Monday, 9 August) | 5 | Mike Bahía | Jesús Zaez | "Robarte un Beso" | Mike's choice |
| Episode 48 (Monday, 9 August) | 6 | Mike Bahía | Karin Idol | Medley of Dragon Ball songs | Bottom two |
| Episode 48 (Monday, 9 August) | 7 | Mike Bahía | Stefano Grande | "22" | Bottom two |
| Episode 48 (Monday, 9 August) | 8 | Mike Bahía | Randy Feijoo | "Tormento" | Public's vote |
| Episode 49 (Tuesday, 10 August) | 1 | Guillermo Dávila | Miluska Eskenazi | "Ángel" | Bottom two |
| Episode 49 (Tuesday, 10 August) | 2 | Guillermo Dávila | Emanuel Rivera | "Love of My Life" | Guillermo's choice |
| Episode 49 (Tuesday, 10 August) | 3 | Guillermo Dávila | Oriana Montero | "Oye" | Public's vote |
| Episode 49 (Tuesday, 10 August) | 4 | Guillermo Dávila | Sebastian Mahle | "You Give Love a Bad Name" | Bottom two |
| Episode 49 (Tuesday, 10 August) | 5 | Daniela Darcourt | Freddy Armas | "Si nos dejan" | Bottom two |
| Episode 49 (Tuesday, 10 August) | 6 | Daniela Darcourt | Javo | "Radio Ga Ga" | Bottom two |
| Episode 49 (Tuesday, 10 August) | 7 | Daniela Darcourt | Joaquina Carruitero | "Lo que son las cosas" | Public's vote |
| Episode 49 (Tuesday, 10 August) | 8 | Daniela Darcourt | Sebastián Palma | "Puerta del amor" | Daniela's choice |
| Episode 50 (Wednesday, 11 August) | 1 | Daniela Darcourt | Freddy Armas | "Morir de Amor" | Eliminated |
| Episode 50 (Wednesday, 11 August) | 2 | Daniela Darcourt | Javo | "Porque un hombre no llora" | Public's vote |
| Episode 50 (Wednesday, 11 August) | 3 | Mike Bahía | Stefano Grande | "Karma Chameleon" | Public's vote |
| Episode 50 (Wednesday, 11 August) | 4 | Mike Bahía | Karin Idol | "Butter-Fly" | Eliminated |
| Episode 50 (Wednesday, 11 August) | 5 | Eva Ayllón | Lucy Young | "Se acabó y punto" | Public's vote |
| Episode 50 (Wednesday, 11 August) | 6 | Eva Ayllón | Carmen Marina | "Alpaquitay" | Eliminated |
| Episode 50 (Wednesday, 11 August) | 7 | Guillermo Dávila | Miluska Eskenazi | "Creo en mí" | Eliminated |
| Episode 50 (Wednesday, 11 August) | 8 | Guillermo Dávila | Sebastian Mahle | "El vicioso" | Public's vote |

Non-competition performances
| Order | Artists | Song |
|---|---|---|
| 48.1 | Eva and her team (Carmen, Lucy, Thony, and Valeria) | "El guaranguito" |
| 49.1 | Daniela and her team (Freddy, Javo, Joaquina, and Sebastián) | "Yo viviré" |

=== Live playoffs (part one) ===
In the playoffs, a two-parts phase with three nights of performances each, the coaches divide their six-members team into two groups of three, with one group of each team performing in a part. A team group performs in one of the first two nights. Only one artist, per team, is saved by the public, while the other two have the second chance to perform on night three, when each coach chooses one contestant to advance to the next round.

Playoffs (part one) results
| Episode | Order | Coach | Contestant | Song | Result |
|---|---|---|---|---|---|
| Episode 51 (Thursday, 12 August) | 1 | Eva Ayllón | Narda Pumarada | "Chabuca funk" | Bottom two |
| Episode 51 (Thursday, 12 August) | 2 | Eva Ayllón | Thony Valencia | "Lo que un día fue no será" | Public's vote |
| Episode 51 (Thursday, 12 August) | 3 | Eva Ayllón | Milena Warthon | "No me arrepiento de este amor" | Bottom two |
| Episode 51 (Thursday, 12 August) | 4 | Guillermo Dávila | Marcela Navarro | "Esta Ausencia" | Public's vote |
| Episode 51 (Thursday, 12 August) | 5 | Guillermo Dávila | Fito Flores | "Mujer amante" | Bottom two |
| Episode 51 (Thursday, 12 August) | 6 | Guillermo Dávila | Oriana Montero | "Sola Otra Vez" | Bottom two |
| Episode 52 (Friday, 13 August) | 1 | Daniela Darcourt | Grace Morales | "Quédate" | Bottom two |
| Episode 52 (Friday, 13 August) | 2 | Daniela Darcourt | Jair Montaño | "Mix Chacalon" | Public's vote |
| Episode 52 (Friday, 13 August) | 3 | Daniela Darcourt | Sebastián Palma | "Killer Queen" | Bottom two |
| Episode 52 (Friday, 13 August) | 4 | Mike Bahía | Jesús Zaez | "Historia de un amor" | Bottom two |
| Episode 52 (Friday, 13 August) | 5 | Mike Bahía | Nicolle Manrique | Medley of Disco songs | Bottom two |
| Episode 52 (Friday, 13 August) | 6 | Mike Bahía | Jeyko Atoche | "Triste payaso" | Public's vote |
| Episode 53 (Saturday, 14 August) | 1 | Mike Bahía | Nicolle Manrique | "Aguanilé" / "Quimbara" | Mike's choice |
| Episode 53 (Saturday, 14 August) | 2 | Mike Bahía | Jesús Zaez | "La Rutina" | Eliminated |
| Episode 53 (Saturday, 14 August) | 3 | Daniela Darcourt | Grace Morales | "The Greatest Love of All" | Eliminated |
| Episode 53 (Saturday, 14 August) | 4 | Daniela Darcourt | Sebastián Palma | "El Poder Nuestro Es" | Daniela's choice |
| Episode 53 (Saturday, 14 August) | 5 | Guillermo Dávila | Fito Flores | "We Are the Champions" | Guillermo's choice |
| Episode 53 (Saturday, 14 August) | 6 | Guillermo Dávila | Oriana Montero | "Desesperado" | Eliminated |
| Episode 53 (Saturday, 14 August) | 7 | Eva Ayllón | Narda Pumarada | "If I Ain't Got You" | Eliminated |
| Episode 53 (Saturday, 14 August) | 8 | Eva Ayllón | Milena Warthon | "Me niego" | Eva's choice |

Non-competition performances
| Order | Artists | Song |
|---|---|---|
| 51.1 | Amy Gutiérrez and Edu Baluarte | "No es cierto" |
| 52.1 | Mike and his team (Iván, Jesús, Jeyko, Nicolle, Randy, and Stefano) | "Cuenta conmigo" |

== Week 10 ==
=== Live playoffs (part two) ===
Playoffs (part two) results
| Episode | Order | Coach | Contestant | Song | Result |
|---|---|---|---|---|---|
| Episode 54 (Monday, 16 August) | 1 | Guillermo Dávila | Emanuel Rivera | "Hoy" | Bottom two |
| Episode 54 (Monday, 16 August) | 2 | Guillermo Dávila | Edu Baluarte | "Me va a extrañar" | Bottom two |
| Episode 54 (Monday, 16 August) | 3 | Guillermo Dávila | Sebastian Mahle | "Welcome to the Jungle" | Public's vote |
| Episode 54 (Monday, 16 August) | 4 | Eva Ayllón | Lucy Young | "Vamos a darnos tiempo" | Bottom two |
| Episode 54 (Monday, 16 August) | 5 | Eva Ayllón | Giani Méndez | "Burundanga" / "La pollera colorá" | Bottom two |
| Episode 54 (Monday, 16 August) | 6 | Eva Ayllón | Valeria Zapata | "Ya no más" | Public's vote |
| Episode 55 (Tuesday, 17 August) | 1 | Mike Bahía | Iván MC | "My Space" | Bottom two |
| Episode 55 (Tuesday, 17 August) | 2 | Mike Bahía | Stefano Grande | "Cómo mirarte" | Bottom two |
| Episode 55 (Tuesday, 17 August) | 3 | Mike Bahía | Randy Feijoo | "Susurro indiscreto" | Public's vote |
| Episode 55 (Tuesday, 17 August) | 4 | Daniela Darcourt | Javo | "Siempre pierdo en el amor" | Bottom two |
| Episode 55 (Tuesday, 17 August) | 5 | Daniela Darcourt | Aldair Sánchez | "Cabellos blancos" | Bottom two |
| Episode 55 (Tuesday, 17 August) | 6 | Daniela Darcourt | Joaquina Carruitero | "And I Am Telling You I'm Not Going" | Public's vote |
| Episode 56 (Wednesday, 18 August) | 1 | Daniela Darcourt | Javo | "Amazing" | Eliminated |
| Episode 56 (Wednesday, 18 August) | 2 | Daniela Darcourt | Aldair Sánchez | "La primera vez" | Daniela's choice |
| Episode 56 (Wednesday, 18 August) | 3 | Mike Bahía | Iván MC | "Waitin" | Mike's choice |
| Episode 56 (Wednesday, 18 August) | 4 | Mike Bahía | Stefano Grande | "Watermelon Sugar" | Eliminated |
| Episode 56 (Wednesday, 18 August) | 5 | Eva Ayllón | Lucy Young | "De qué estoy hecha" | Eva's choice |
| Episode 56 (Wednesday, 18 August) | 6 | Eva Ayllón | Giani Méndez | "Ahora te puedes marchar" | Eliminated |
| Episode 56 (Wednesday, 18 August) | 7 | Guillermo Dávila | Emanuel Rivera | "Ya no hay forma de pedir perdón" | Guillermo's choice |
| Episode 56 (Wednesday, 18 August) | 8 | Guillermo Dávila | Edu Baluarte | "Amor, Amor" | Eliminated |

Non-competition performances
| Order | Artists | Song |
|---|---|---|
| 54.1 | Pelo d'Ambrosio and Milena Warthon | "Esta noche" |

=== Live quarter-finals ===
In the quarter-finals, the four members of two teams perform in one of the first two nights. Per team, two artists are saved, one by the public and another by their respective coach. On night three, the artists that were not initially saved have the second chance to perform and one artist (per team) is saved by their coach.

Quarter-finals results
| Episode | Order | Coach | Contestant | Song | Result |
|---|---|---|---|---|---|
| Episode 57 (Thursday, 19 August) | 1 | Daniela Darcourt | Aldair Sánchez | "El alcatraz" | Daniela's choice |
| Episode 57 (Thursday, 19 August) | 2 | Daniela Darcourt | Sebastián Palma | "Por tu amor" | Public's vote |
| Episode 57 (Thursday, 19 August) | 3 | Daniela Darcourt | Jair Montaño | "Amor por ti" | Bottom two |
| Episode 57 (Thursday, 19 August) | 4 | Daniela Darcourt | Joaquina Carruitero | "Todos Me Miran" | Bottom two |
| Episode 57 (Thursday, 19 August) | 5 | Guillermo Dávila | Fito Flores | "Don't Stop Believin'" | Public's vote |
| Episode 57 (Thursday, 19 August) | 6 | Guillermo Dávila | Emanuel Rivera | "Bachata Rosa" | Bottom two |
| Episode 57 (Thursday, 19 August) | 7 | Guillermo Dávila | Sebastian Mahle | "Quédate" | Bottom two |
| Episode 57 (Thursday, 19 August) | 8 | Guillermo Dávila | Marcela Navarro | "Mi soledad y yo" | Guillermo's choice |
| Episode 58 (Friday, 20 August) | 1 | Eva Ayllón | Milena Warthon | "José Antonio" | Bottom two |
| Episode 58 (Friday, 20 August) | 2 | Eva Ayllón | Lucy Young | "Yo perdí el corazón" | Bottom two |
| Episode 58 (Friday, 20 August) | 3 | Eva Ayllón | Thony Valencia | "Como has hecho" / "Niñachay” | Eva's choice |
| Episode 58 (Friday, 20 August) | 4 | Eva Ayllón | Valeria Zapata | "Detrás de Mi Ventana" | Public's vote |
| Episode 58 (Friday, 20 August) | 5 | Mike Bahía | Nicolle Manrique | "Y, ¿Si Fuera Ella?" | Bottom two |
| Episode 58 (Friday, 20 August) | 6 | Mike Bahía | Iván MC | "Tú sin mí" | Bottom two |
| Episode 58 (Friday, 20 August) | 7 | Mike Bahía | Jeyko Atoche | "Raices del festejo" | Mike's choice |
| Episode 58 (Friday, 20 August) | 8 | Mike Bahía | Randy Feijoo | "Todo Mi Corazón" | Public's vote |
| Episode 59 (Saturday, 21 August) | 1 | Mike Bahía | Nicolle Manrique | "Como Tu Mujer" | Eliminated |
| Episode 59 (Saturday, 21 August) | 2 | Mike Bahía | Iván MC | "Aire" | Mike's choice |
| Episode 59 (Saturday, 21 August) | 3 | Guillermo Dávila | Emanuel Rivera | "La Flaca" | Eliminated |
| Episode 59 (Saturday, 21 August) | 4 | Guillermo Dávila | Sebastian Mahle | "Are You Gonna Be My Girl" | Guillermo's choice |
| Episode 59 (Saturday, 21 August) | 5 | Daniela Darcourt | Jair Montaño | Medley of Néctar songs | Eliminated |
| Episode 59 (Saturday, 21 August) | 6 | Daniela Darcourt | Joaquina Carruitero | "Anyone" | Daniela's choice |
| Episode 59 (Saturday, 21 August) | 7 | Eva Ayllón | Lucy Young | "Mi mayor venganza" | Eva's choice |
| Episode 59 (Saturday, 21 August) | 8 | Eva Ayllón | Milena Warthon | "Chiquitita" | Eliminated |

Non-competition performances
| Order | Artists | Song |
|---|---|---|
| 59.1 | Eva Ayllón, Daniela Darcourt, and Renata Flores | "Arriba Perú" |

== Week 11 ==
=== Live semi-finals ===
In the semi-finals, the three artists of two teams perform in one of the first two nights, and two artists are saved — one by the public and other by their coach — and the not chosen artist is eliminated. On night three, every advancing artist performs and one artist is chosen by their coach to go through to the grand finale.

Semi-finals results
| Episode | Order | Coach | Contestant | Song | Result |
|---|---|---|---|---|---|
| Episode 60 (Monday, 23 August) | 1 | Guillermo Dávila | Sebastián Mahle | "Prófugos" | Eliminated |
| Episode 60 (Monday, 23 August) | 2 | Guillermo Dávila | Marcela Navarro | "Si tú no estás aqui" | Guillermo's choice |
| Episode 60 (Monday, 23 August) | 3 | Guillermo Dávila | Fito Flores | "Pegasus Fantasy" | Public's vote |
| Episode 60 (Monday, 23 August) | 4 | Mike Bahía | Jeyko Atoche | "Cuando llora mi guitarra" | Mike's choice |
| Episode 60 (Monday, 23 August) | 5 | Mike Bahía | Iván MC | "Detente" | Eliminated |
| Episode 60 (Monday, 23 August) | 6 | Mike Bahía | Randy Feijoo | "Señora" | Public's vote |
| Episode 61 (Tuesday, 24 August) | 1 | Daniela Darcourt | Joaquina Carruitero | "Mucho más allá" | Eliminated |
| Episode 61 (Tuesday, 24 August) | 2 | Daniela Darcourt | Sebastián Palma | "Hijo de la Luna" | Daniela's choice |
| Episode 61 (Tuesday, 24 August) | 3 | Daniela Darcourt | Aldair Sánchez | "Dos gardenias" | Public's vote |
| Episode 61 (Tuesday, 24 August) | 4 | Eva Ayllón | Valeria Zapata | "La dueña soy yo" | Eva's choice |
| Episode 61 (Tuesday, 24 August) | 5 | Eva Ayllón | Lucy Young | "El espejo" | Eliminated |
| Episode 61 (Tuesday, 24 August) | 6 | Eva Ayllón | Thony Valencia | "La soledad" | Public's vote |
| Episode 62 (Wednesday, 25 August) | 1 | Guillermo Dávila | Fito Flores | "It's My Life" | Eliminated |
| Episode 62 (Wednesday, 25 August) | 2 | Guillermo Dávila | Marcela Navarro | "Barco a la deriva" | Guillermo's finalist |
| Episode 62 (Wednesday, 25 August) | 3 | Daniela Darcourt | Aldaír Sánchez | "Perdóname" | Daniela's finalist |
| Episode 62 (Wednesday, 25 August) | 4 | Daniela Darcourt | Sebastián Palma | "Breaking the Law" | Eliminated |
| Episode 62 (Wednesday, 25 August) | 5 | Eva Ayllón | Thony Valencia | "Noelia" | Eliminated |
| Episode 62 (Wednesday, 25 August) | 6 | Eva Ayllón | Valeria Zapata | "Él me mintió" | Eva's finalist |
| Episode 62 (Wednesday, 25 August) | 7 | Mike Bahía | Randy Feijoo | "Perdí mi oportunidad" | Mike's finalist |
| Episode 62 (Wednesday, 25 August) | 8 | Mike Bahía | Jeyko Atoche | "Tu amor fue una mentira" | Eliminated |

=== Live finale ===
In the finale, the public votes for their favourite artist. The one with most votes is named the voice of Peru.

Finale results
| Episode | Round | Order | Coach | Contestant | Song | Result |
|---|---|---|---|---|---|---|
| Episode 63 (Thursday, 26 August) | One | 1 | Mike Bahía | Randy Feijoo | "Hasta Que Me Olvides" | Top 3 |
| Episode 63 (Thursday, 26 August) | One | 2 | Eva Ayllón | Valeria Zapata | "Señor amante" | Top 3 |
| Episode 63 (Thursday, 26 August) | One | 3 | Daniela Darcourt | Aldaír Sánchez | "Ingá" | Fourth place |
| Episode 63 (Thursday, 26 August) | One | 4 | Guillermo Dávila | Marcela Navarro | "En cambio no" | Top 3 |
| Episode 63 (Thursday, 26 August) | Two | 5 | Mike Bahía | Randy Feijoo | "Todo Mi Corazón" | Runner-up |
| Episode 63 (Thursday, 26 August) | Two | 6 | Eva Ayllón | Valeria Zapata | "Ya no más" | Third place |
| Episode 63 (Thursday, 26 August) | Two | 7 | Guillermo Dávila | Marcela Navarro | "Mi soledad y yo" | Winner |

== Elimination chart ==
=== Color key ===
Artist's info

- Team Daniela
- Team Guillermo
- Team Mike
- Team Eva

Result details

- Winner
- Runner-up
- Third place
- Fourth place
- Saved by public
- Saved by her/his coach
- Placed in the bottom two
- Eliminated

=== Overall ===
Live concerts' results
| Artists | Round of 32 | | Playoffs | | Quarter-finals | Semi-finals | | Finale |
| Artists | Part 1 | Part 2 | Part 1 | Part 2 | Quarter-finals | Part 1 | Part 2 | Finale |
|---|---|---|---|---|---|---|---|---|
| Marcela Navarro | Safe | —N/a | Safe | —N/a | Safe | Safe | Safe | Winner |
| Randy Feijoo | —N/a | Safe | —N/a | Safe | Safe | Safe | Safe | Runner-up |
| Valeria Zapata | —N/a | Safe | —N/a | Safe | Safe | Safe | Safe | Third place |
| Aldair Sánchez | Safe | —N/a | —N/a | Safe | Safe | Safe | Safe | Fourth place |
| Fito Flores | Bottom two | —N/a | Safe | —N/a | Safe | Safe | Eliminated | Eliminated (Semi-finals, part two) |
| Jeyko Atoche | Safe | —N/a | Safe | —N/a | Safe | Safe | Eliminated | Eliminated (Semi-finals, part two) |
| Sebastián Palma | —N/a | Safe | Safe | —N/a | Safe | Safe | Eliminated | Eliminated (Semi-finals, part two) |
| Thony Valencia | —N/a | Safe | Safe | —N/a | Safe | Safe | Eliminated | Eliminated (Semi-finals, part two) |
| Iván MC | Bottom two | —N/a | —N/a | Safe | Bottom two | Eliminated | Eliminated (Semi-finals, part one) | |
| Joaquina Carruitero | —N/a | Safe | —N/a | Safe | Bottom two | Eliminated | Eliminated (Semi-finals, part one) | |
| Lucy Young | —N/a | Bottom two | —N/a | Safe | Bottom two | Eliminated | Eliminated (Semi-finals, part one) | |
| Sebastian Mahle | —N/a | Bottom two | —N/a | Safe | Bottom two | Eliminated | Eliminated (Semi-finals, part one) | |
| Emanuel Rivera | —N/a | Safe | —N/a | Safe | Eliminated | Eliminated (quarter-finals) | | |
| Jair Montaño | Bottom two | —N/a | Safe | —N/a | Eliminated | Eliminated (quarter-finals) | | |
| Milena Warthon | Safe | —N/a | Safe | —N/a | Eliminated | Eliminated (quarter-finals) | | |
| Nicolle Manrique | Safe | —N/a | Safe | —N/a | Eliminated | Eliminated (quarter-finals) | | |
| Edu Baluarte | Safe | —N/a | —N/a | Eliminated | Eliminated (Playoffs, part two) | | | |
| Giani Méndez | Bottom two | —N/a | —N/a | Eliminated | Eliminated (Playoffs, part two) | | | |
| Javo | —N/a | Bottom two | —N/a | Eliminated | Eliminated (Playoffs, part two) | | | |
| Stefano Grande | —N/a | Bottom two | —N/a | Eliminated | Eliminated (Playoffs, part two) | | | |
| Grace Morales | Safe | —N/a | Eliminated | Eliminated (Playoffs, part one) | | | | |
| Jesús Zaez | —N/a | Safe | Eliminated | Eliminated (Playoffs, part one) | | | | |
| Narda Pumarada | Safe | —N/a | Eliminated | Eliminated (Playoffs, part one) | | | | |
| Oriana Montero | —N/a | Safe | Eliminated | Eliminated (Playoffs, part one) | | | | |
| Carmen Marina | —N/a | Eliminated | Eliminated (round of 32, part two) | | | | | |
| Freddy Armas | —N/a | Eliminated | Eliminated (round of 32, part two) | | | | | |
| Karin Idol | —N/a | Eliminated | Eliminated (round of 32, part two) | | | | | |
| Miluska Eskenazi | —N/a | Eliminated | Eliminated (round of 32, part two) | | | | | |
| Jean Paul Moreno | Eliminated | Eliminated (round of 32, part one) | | | | | | |
| Joseph Buitrón | Eliminated | Eliminated (round of 32, part one) | | | | | | |
| Natasha Hernández | Eliminated | Eliminated (round of 32, part one) | | | | | | |
| Paula Leonardi | Eliminated | Eliminated (round of 32, part one) | | | | | | |

=== Per team ===
Live concerts' results
| Artists | Round of 32 | | Playoffs | | Quarter-finals | Semi-finals | | Finale |
| Artists | Part 1 | Part 2 | Part 1 | Part 2 | Quarter-finals | Part 1 | Part 2 | Finale |
|---|---|---|---|---|---|---|---|---|
| Aldair Sánchez | Public's vote | —N/a | —N/a | Coach's choice | Coach's choice | Public's vote | Coach's choice | Fourth place |
| Sebastián Palma | —N/a | Coach's choice | Coach's choice | —N/a | Public's vote | Coach's choice | Eliminated | |
| Joaquina Carruitero | —N/a | Public's vote | —N/a | Public's vote | Bottom two | Eliminated | | |
| Jair Montaño | Bottom two | —N/a | Public's vote | —N/a | Eliminated | | | |
| Javo | —N/a | Bottom two | —N/a | Eliminated | | | | |
| Grace Morales | Coach's choice | —N/a | Eliminated | | | | | |
| Freddy Armas | —N/a | Eliminated | | | | | | |
| Jean Paul Moreno | Eliminated | | | | | | | |
| Marcela Navarro | Coach's choice | —N/a | Public's vote | —N/a | Coach's choice | Coach's choice | Coach's choice | Winner |
| Fito Flores | Bottom two | —N/a | Coach's choice | —N/a | Public's vote | Public's vote | Eliminated | |
| Sebastian Mahle | —N/a | Bottom two | —N/a | Public's vote | Bottom two | Eliminated | | |
| Emanuel Rivera | —N/a | Coach's choice | —N/a | Coach's choice | Eliminated | | | |
| Edu Baluarte | Public's vote | —N/a | —N/a | Eliminated | | | | |
| Oriana Montero | —N/a | Public's vote | Eliminated | | | | | |
| Miluska Eskenazi | —N/a | Eliminated | | | | | | |
| Joseph Buitrón | Eliminated | | | | | | | |
| Randy Feijoo | —N/a | Public's vote | —N/a | Public's vote | Public's vote | Public's vote | Coach's choice | Runner-up |
| Jeyko Atoche | Public's vote | —N/a | Public's vote | —N/a | Coach's choice | Coach's choice | Eliminated | |
| Iván MC | Bottom two | —N/a | —N/a | Coach's choice | Bottom two | Eliminated | | |
| Nicolle Manrique | Coach's choice | —N/a | Coach's choice | —N/a | Eliminated | | | |
| Stefano Grande | —N/a | Bottom two | —N/a | Eliminated | | | | |
| Jesús Zaez | —N/a | Coach's choice | Eliminated | | | | | |
| Karin Idol | —N/a | Eliminated | | | | | | |
| Paula Leonardi | Eliminated | | | | | | | |
| Valeria Zapata | —N/a | Public's vote | —N/a | Public's vote | Public's vote | Coach's choice | Coach's choice | Third place |
| Thony Valencia | —N/a | Coach's choice | Public's vote | —N/a | Coach's choice | Public's vote | Eliminated | |
| Lucy Young | —N/a | Bottom two | —N/a | Coach's choice | Bottom two | Eliminated | | |
| Milena Warthon | Public's vote | —N/a | Coach's choice | —N/a | Eliminated | | | |
| Giani Méndez | Bottom two | —N/a | —N/a | Eliminated | | | | |
| Narda Pumarada | Coach's choice | —N/a | Eliminated | | | | | |
| Carmen Marina | —N/a | Eliminated | | | | | | |
| Natasha Hernández | Eliminated | | | | | | | |
