= Cada Cancion con su Razon =

Cada Canción con su Razón

Studio album by Chabuca Granda
- Released: 1981
- Label: EMI

Cada Canción con su Razón is a studio album by Chabuca Granda released on the EMI label in 1981.

Granda had suffered a heart attack in 1979 and was in poor health thereafter. She recorded Cada Cancion con su Razon in 1980 at the EMI studios in Buenos Aires while performing in Argentina. She was accompanied by Caitro Soto, Pititi Sirio, and Álvaro Lagos. Lucho González was in charge of arranging and conducted the orchestra, and Hugo Casas was the album's artistic director. The album combined newer works and new renditions of Granda's classic songs.

It was Granda's final album, as she died March 1983.

== Track listing ==
Side A

1. "La flor de la canela"
2. "El surco"
3. "Zaguan
4. "Toro mata"
5. "Una larga noche"
6. "José Antonio"

Side B

1. "Fina estampa"
2. "Coplas a Fray Martin"
3. "La torre de Marfil"
4. "Ollita Nomas"
5. "Cardo o ceniza"
6. "El puente de los suspiros"
