= Pepe Villalobos =

Peruvian musician (1930–2026)

- Born: 8 April 1930; Barrios Altos, Lima, Peru
- Died: 31 July 2026 (aged 96)
- Children: 5, including Victoria Villalobos
- Relatives: Arturo "Zambo" Cavero (cousin)

José "Pepe" Villalobos Cavero (8 April 1930 – 31 July 2026), nicknamed the Rey del Festejo (transl. King of Festejo), was a Peruvian musician and composer. He specialized in Peruvian Creole music and Afro-Peruvian music and wrote several popular Afro-Peruvian songs during the 1960s and 1970s.

Villalobos learnt music as a child growing up in Barrios Altos and Jirón Áncash, a neighborhood and a street in Lima, Peru. When he was 15, he began performing on Lima radio stations. Villalobos toured internationally alongside musicians such as Óscar Avilés and his cousin, Zambo Cavero; over time, he shifted his focus from performing to music composition and research. He won multiple awards from APDAYC and the Peruvian Ministry of Culture in his lifetime and ran a club with his daughter.

== Music ==
Villalobos grew up in a musical neighborhood. At the age of ten, he moved to a house on Jirón Áncash near the cajón player Víctor Arciniega Samamé, also known as El Gancho; Arciniega served as Villalobos's first music teacher, though he learnt from a variety of elder Black musicians. When he was fifteen, he began performing on local Lima radio stations.

Though he had started as a performer, touring Latin America, Mexico, and the United States with musicians such as Óscar Avilés and Zambo Cavero, Villalobos later turned his focus to research and music composition. He recorded Lima folklore and set it to music; stories about colonial-era slavery in Peru formed the basis of songs such as Chinchiví and La Carimba. Much of his success came during the 1960s and 1970s, when he wrote several popular Peruvian Creole songs. He became known as an expert on Afro-Peruvian music. Villalobos studied at the Instituto Musical Bach in the 1980s and, from 1979 to 1983, sang in a choir at the National University of San Marcos.

Villalobos was the subject of the 2021 book Villalobos: El rey del festejo by Vicente and Tilsa Otta. A member of APDAYC, awards Villalobos won from the organization included the Esmeraldas Musicales award, Zafiro Musical award, and Eduardo Márquez Talledo award. He also received various awards from the Ministry of Culture and, in the 1970s, won multiple music competitions at the Festival de Arte Negro in Cañete.

With his daughter, Villalobos ran a club in the Lince district of Lima: the Asociación Cultural Musical La Casa de Pepe Villalobos.

=== Compositions ===
- Mi comadre Cocoliche
- Mueve tu Cucú
- Negrito Chinchiví (1975)
- Copas Mías
- Cintura Quebrá
- La Carimba
- A mi Barrios Altos

== Personal life and death ==
Villalobos was born on 8 April 1930, in the neighborhood of Barrios Altos in Lima, Peru. When he was ten, he moved to Jirón Áncash. He was the nephew of pianist Alejandro Villalobos and the cousin of singer Zambo Cavero. Villalobos was married to Angélica Ruiz; the couple had five children, including the singer Victoria Villalobos. He had Afro-Peruvian and non-Afro-Peruvian ancestry.

Later in his life, Villalobos had multiple heart attacks. He died on 31 July 2026, at the age of 96.
