= Tarimba Negra =

Studio album by Chabuca Granda
- Released: 1978
- Genre: Musica Criolla
- Label: Movieplay

Musica Criolla is the seventh studio album from the Peruvian singer-songwriter Chabuca Granda. It was released in 1978 on the Movieplay label. It is regarded as one of the most important contributions to Peruvian folk music. In a 2024 ranking of the 600 greatest Latin American albums, Tarimba Negra was ranked No. 20. The album included the hit single Cardo o ceniza.

== Track listing ==
A1 Landó (Chabuca Granda) 3:27
A2 Canterurías (Chabuca Granda) 2:47
A3 El Arrullo (traditional, adapted by Carlos Soto de la Colina) 3:09
A4 Coplas A Fray Martín (Chabuca Granda) 3:18
A5 La Herida Oscura (Chabuca Granda) 2:15
A6 El Sereno Y La Almudena (Chabuca Granda) 4:29

B1 El Surco (Chabuca Granda) 2:52
B2 Una Larga Noche (Chabuca Granda) 3:36
B3 Curruñau (Carlos Soto de la Colina) 2:33
B4 Cardo o ceniza (Chabuca Granda) 3:25
B5 Cuatro Tiempos Negros Jóvenes (Félix Casaverde) 7:10
