= Fina estampa =

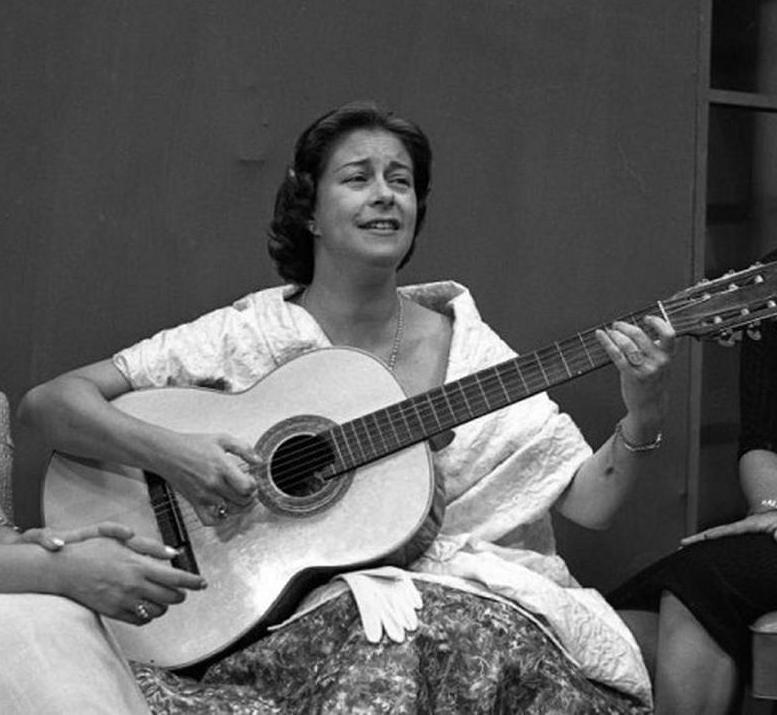

Song by Chabuca Granda
- Songwriter: Chabuca Granda

"Fina estampa" (translation "fine mien") is a song written in 1956 by the Peruvian singer-songwriter, Chabuca Granda. The song is a Peruvian waltz in the "música criolla" style.

== Lyrics and dedication ==
The song was written on April 21, 1956. The song was dedicated to her father, Eduardo Granda, and his qualities as a gentleman that made women swoon. The lyrics describe a gentleman with elegant clothes and hat as he strolls through the streets, causing a little girl to smile and windows to stir.

== Recording history ==
=== First recording by Los Cinco ===
In 1961, Mario Cavagnaro, the head of the "Sono Radio" record label, proposed an album compiling Granda's best compositions. The album was titled "Lo mejor de Chabuca Granda" ("The Best of Chabuca Granda"). Granda was allowed to select her favorite interpreters to perform on the album. For "Fina estampa", she chose the group, "Los Cinco". The song appeared as the second track on the album.

=== Recordings by Granda ===
In 1968, Granda recorded the song in her own voice for her album, "Voz y Vena de Chabuca Granda". She was accompanied on the album by musicians, Martín Torres, Rafael Amaranto, Vicente Vásquez, and Carlos Hayre.

In 1973, Granda again recorded the song for her album, "Grande De América", produced for the RCA Victor label. For the album's recording of "Fina estampa", she was accompanied by Óscar Avilés on guitar and by Chucho Ferrer on organ.

Granda again performed the song in November 1977 for the program, 300 millones of Televisión Española. She was accompanied on the performance by Rodolfo Arteaga, Félix Casaverde, and Caitro Soto.

Granda suffered a heart attack in 1979 and was in poor health thereafter. She recorded her final album, Cada Cancion con su Razon, in 1980 at the EMI studios in Buenos Aires. She included "Fina estampa" on the album with accompaniment by Caitro Soto, Pititi Sirio, and Álvaro Lagos.

=== Cover versions ===
The song is among Granda's most famous and has become known internationally.

Brazilian artist Caetano Veloso, winner of nine Latin Grammy Awards, covered the song as the title track for his 1994 album, Fina Estampa. Veloso's Fina Estampa album was so successful that he also produced and released a live version, Fina Estampa Ao Vivo.

Tania Libertad, recipient of the Latin Grammy Lifetime Achievement Award, also covered "Fina estampa" on multiple recordings, including her 1983 tribute to Granda, Lo Inolvidable de Chabuca Granda, and on her 1997 album Libertad de Manzanero.

The "Los Hispanos" Puerto Rican quartet covered the song in their 1965 album "Fiesta de las Américas". The album is a selection of songs from several Latin-American countries and "Fina Estampa" was selected to represent Perú.

Salsa artist Celia Cruz recorded the song for her 1974 album, La Ceiba, and it was also later included on The Very Best of Celia Cruz.

"Fina estampa" was also popularized in ranchera versions by Aida Cuevas and Lucha Villa.

The Peruvian operatic tenor Juan Diego Flórez, backed by the Fort Worth Symphony Orchestra, covered the song for his 2006 crossover album of Latin American standards. Critic James Manheim of AllMusic described Flórez as "completely at home" in his "delightful" rendition of the song.

The French singer Juliette Noureddine also covered this song in her 2008 album Bijoux & babioles.

== Recognition ==
In 2017, Granda's body of musical work was declared a part of the "Patrimonio Cultural de la Nación" ("Cultural Heritage of the Nation"). "Fina estampa" was cited in the declaration as one of Granda's emblematic works.

In 2019, La República, one of the two major national newspapers in Peru, included "Fina estampa" on its list of the six best songs of Granda that have represented Peru around the world. The magazine Caretas also included the song in its 2020 listing of Granda's five most emblematic songs.

In 2020, on the 100th anniversary of Granda's birth, Peru's Ministry of Culture published a book on Granda's life and works, written by Rodrigo Sarmiento Herencia. Sarmiento opened the book by naming "Fina estampa" among Granda's four most recognized works, demonstrating her unfading creative capacity and talent.
