= Versiones =

Studio album by Gian Marco
- Released: May 27, 2013
- Recorded: February–March 2013
- Genre: Latin pop, rock, ballad, jazz
- Language: Spanish, Portuguese, English
- Label: 11 y 6 Discos
- Producer: Memo Gil

Gian Marco chronology
20 Años (2012)	Versiones (2013)	#Libre (2015)

Singles from Versiones
- 1. "La flor de la canela" Released: 2013

Versiones is the eleventh studio album by Peruvian singer-songwriter Gian Marco released by 11 y 6 Discos in 2013. The album includes several covers of classic songs in Spanish, Portuguese, and one in English. It was his first album to include a song recorded in English.

== Promotion ==
The album was first released in stores in Mexico on May 27, 2013, and on that same day Gian Marco was performing at the Auditorio Nacional in Mexico City where he would also perform again a few days later on May 30 and 31 with the latter date including 2 shows in the same night once at 7:30 p.m. and the other at 10:00 p.m. right after.

== Commercial performance ==
The album had great success throughout Latin America, entered the Billboard Jazz Albums charts, and was certified gold in Perú. The album was nominated for Album of the Year at the 2013 Latin Grammy Awards. The song "La Vida Nos Espera" received a nomination for instrumental arrangement at the 2014 Grammy Awards.

== Track listing ==
No.	Title	Writer(s)	Length
1.	"Cartas amarillas"	Juan Carlos Calderón	4:07
2.	"Almohada"	Adán Torres	3:52
3.	"Capullito de Alelí"	Rafael Hernández Marín	3:39
4.	"Amor de mis amores"	Agustín Lara	2:46
5.	"Come Fly with Me"	Jimmy Van Heusen, Sammy Cahn	3:29
6.	"Perfidia"	Alberto Domínguez	4:34
7.	"La flor de la canela"	Chabuca Granda	3:27
8.	"Domitila"	Ricardo Díaz Fresneda	3:52
9.	"Ella"	José Alfredo Jiménez	3:06
10.	"Corcovado"	Tom Jobim	3:51
11.	"Tal Para Cual"	Gian Marco	4:19
12.	"La vida nos espera"	Gian Marco, Arturo Sandoval	4:55
13.	"Si no fuera por ti"	Gian Marco	6:05
14.	"Rabo de nube"	Silvio Rodríguez

== Charts ==
Chart (2013)	Peak position
US Billboard Jazz Albums	43

== Certifications and sales ==
Region	Certification	Certified units/sales
Perú (UNIMPRO)	Gold	5,000

== Accolades ==
14th Latin Grammy Awards

Year	Nominee / work	Award	Result
2013	Versiones	Album of the Year	Nominated
