= Arturo "Zambo" Cavero =

Peruvian singer (1940–2009)

- Born: Arturo Cavero Velásquez; 29 November 1940
- Died: 9 October 2009 (aged 68); Jesús María, Lima, Peru
- Occupations: Interpreter, teacher
- Musical career
- Also known as: Zambo Cavero
- Genres: Peruvian Music
- Instruments: Vocals, cajón
- Years active: 1969–2009

Arturo Cavero Velásquez (29 November 1940 – 9 October 2009), better known by the pseudonym "Zambo Cavero", was a Peruvian singer, representative of Afro-Peruvian identity.

== Biography ==
Born in Lima, Peru, he was the son of Juan Cavero, of Huaral, and Digna Velásquez, of Cañete.

His cousin was the musician and composer Pepe Villalobos.

His particular singing style captivated listeners, as his intensity had the feel of Peruvian creole taste.

Zambo Cavero specialised in performing traditional Peruvian waltz. Some of his best performances are songs by Peruvian composers Augusto Polo Campos and Félix Pasache, others are renditions of traditional Peruvian creole music, which is Afro-Peruvian influenced. On 3 June 1987 Cavero, was honoured together with important Peruvian musicians like guitar player Óscar Avilés in Washington, D.C., by the Organization of American States.

Arturo Cavero died from complications of sepsis in Edgardo Rebagliati Martins National Hospital, Lima, on 9 October 2009. Peruvian President Alan García declared a day of national mourning.

== Discography ==
El Comercio newspaper has published his discography

- Arturo 'Zambo' Cavero
- Siempre juntos
- Siempre
- Son nuestros
- Contigo Perú
- Unicos
- Perú al Mundial
- Siguen festejando juntos
- Mueve tu cucú (EP)
- Seguimos valseando festejos
- Que tal trio
