= Contigo Perú =

1977 song by Augusto Polo Campos

Song by Arturo "Zambo" Cavero and Óscar Avilés
- English title: With You, Peru
- Released: 1977
- Genre: Peruvian waltz
- Songwriter: Augusto Polo Campos

"Contigo Perú" (English: "With You, Peru") is a Peruvian waltz composed by Augusto Polo Campos in 1977. The song is widely regarded as the unofficial anthem of the Peru national football team and one of the most recognizable patriotic songs in Peru.

== Background and composition ==
According to Augusto Polo Campos, the song was commissioned by Peruvian president Francisco Morales Bermúdez, then head of the Revolutionary Government of the Armed Forces, through General Augusto Vinatea. The objective was to create a patriotic waltz that would support the Peru national football team during the qualification campaign for the 1978 FIFA World Cup in Argentina.

Polo Campos was reportedly given fifteen days to complete the composition and would receive US$15,000 for the commission. In an interview for the television program Sucedió en el Perú, he stated that he wrote the lyrics in only fifteen minutes while sitting at the Café Haití in Lima.

== First performance ==
The song was first performed at the National Stadium of Peru before an audience of approximately 43,000 spectators. The performers were Augusto Polo Campos himself alongside Arturo "Zambo" Cavero and Óscar Avilés. The presentation took place after Peru's 2–0 victory over the Chile national football team during the 1978 World Cup qualification campaign.

== Legacy ==
Over the decades, "Contigo Perú" has become one of the most emblematic songs associated with Peruvian national identity and football culture. It is frequently performed during matches involving the Peru national football team and at civic celebrations.

In October 2018, the musical work of Augusto Polo Campos, including "Contigo Perú", was declared part of the Cultural Heritage of the Nation by the Peruvian government.

== See also ==
- Augusto Polo Campos
- Music of Peru
