= Libre (Gian Marco album) =

Studio album by Gian Marco
- Released: June 4, 2015
- Genre: Latin pop, rock, ballad
- Language: Spanish
- Label: 11 y 6 Discos
- Producer: Gian Marco Zignago

Gian Marco chronology
| Versiones (2013) | Libre (2015) | Intuición (2018) |

Singles from Libre
- 1. "La Vida Entera" Released: 2015; 2. "Vida De Mi Vida" Released: 2015; 3. "Aunque Ya No Vuelva A Verte" Released: 2015

#Libre is the twleveth studio album by Peruvian singer-songwriter Gian Marco released by 11 y 6 Discos on June 4, 2015. It was his first release since 2013. Gian Marco also produced the album, making this his debut as a music producer.

== Release ==
The album was released on June 4, 2015 on both physical cd and digital download. A Special Edition of the album was released on June 21, 2016.

== Commercial performance ==
The album got attention for Gian Marco collaborating with his daughter Nicole Zignago on the song Vida De Mi Vida which helped it to have great success throughout Latin America and was certified gold in Perú. It entered the Billboard Latin Pop Albums chart peaking at #19, becoming Gian Marco's first album to enter that chart. The album received two nominations at the 2015 Latin Grammy Awards.

== Track listing ==
All credits adapted from AllMusic.

| No. | Title | Writer(s) | Length |
|---|---|---|---|
| 1. | "Aunque ya no vuelva a verte" | Gian Marco Zignago |
| 2. | "Mis Cicatrices" | Zignago, Leonel Garcia |
| 3. | "Vida De Mi Vida" | Zignago |
| 4. | "La Vida Entera" | Zignago, Claudia Brant |
| 5. | "Tengo el Alma Perdida" | Zignago |
| 6. | "Tan Fuerte" | Zignago |
| 7. | "Siempre Tú" | Zignago |
| 8. | "El Amor Que Te Tuve" | Zignago |
| 9. | "Quiéreme" | Zignago |
| 10. | "Tu Mejor Amigo" | Zignago |

== Charts ==
| Chart (2015) | Peak position |
|---|---|
| US Latin Pop Albums (Billboard) | 19 |

== Certifications and sales ==
| Region | Certification | Certified units/sales |
|---|---|---|
| Perú (UNIMPRO) | Gold | 5,000 |

== Accolades ==
16th Latin Grammy Awards

| Year | Nominee / work | Award | Result |
|---|---|---|---|
| 2015 | #Libre | Best Singer-Songwriter Album | Nominated |
| 2015 | Vida De Mi Vida | Song of the Year | Nominated |
