= Lima de veras =

Song by Chabuca Granda
- Released: 1948
- Genre: Peruvian waltz, música criolla
- Songwriter: Chabuca Granda

"Lima de veras" is a song written in 1948 by Chabuca Granda. The song is a Peruvian waltz in the "música criolla" style. It was Granda's first published song and is regarded as one of her most important works.

== Composition ==
"Lima de veras" was Granda's first published song. The song was written in 1948 when two Colombian friends, Armida Cárdenas Moreno and Simón Arboleda, challenged her to a competition in which Granda was to compose a waltz while they composed a bolero. Granda's composition was "Lima de veras".

The song has four parts. In the first part, the lyrics describe the city's wooden balconies and speak of the city with nostalgia, as a "calm illusion" and "beautiful truth." The second part describes a dance that interrupts the flow of light and creates shadows. The third section describes a Lima party and proclaims love for a city where life is defined by dances, flavors, and traditions. The final section, a fugue, tells of the departure of a sailor from Lima and his longing for the city.

Without Granda's knowledge, her friends entered the song in a songwriting competition held in the Rímac District of Lima. Granda's competition won the grand prize, launching her career as a writer and composer.

== Recording history ==
In the 1950s, the song was recorded by a musica criolla trio, Los Morochucos.

In 1961, Mario Cavagnaro, the head of the "Sono Radio" record label, proposed an album compiling Granda's best compositions. The album was titled "Lo mejor de Chabuca Granda" ("The Best of Chabuca Granda"). Granda was allowed to select her favorite interpreters to perform on the album. For "Lima de veras", she chose the group, "Los Cinco".

The song has since been recorded by Granda and other artists, including Peruvian operatic tenor, Juan Diego Flórez.

== Recognition ==
In 2017, Granda's body of musical work was declared a part of the "Patrimonio Cultural de la Nación" ("Cultural Heritage of the Nation"). "Lima de veras" was one of the emblematic works named in the declaration.

In 2020, as part of Peru's "Chabuca eterna" ("eternal Chabuca") celebration upon the 100th anniversary of her birth, the original handwritten manuscript of "Lima de veras", drawn from the archives of the Chabuca Granda Cultural Association, was exhibited.

The song was also the inspiration for the play, "Lima de veras", staged in 2018 and starring Reynaldo Arenas.
