= APDAYC =

Peruvian copyright collective

- Asociación Peruana de Autores y Compositores
- Founded: 20 February 1952
- Type: Copyright collective
- Location: Lima, Peru
- Region served: Peru
- Official language: Spanish
- Website: www.apdayc.org.pe

The Peruvian Association of Authors and Composers (Spanish: Asociación Peruana de Autores y Compositores, known as APDAYC) is a non-profit organization in Peru. It is a collective rights management society. It manages the copyright for the music industry and collects royalties for the public use of musical works.

It is a member of the International Confederation of Societies of Authors and Composers (CISAC).

== History ==
The organization was founded on 20 February 1952 by the composer Eduardo Márquez Talledo. He was the first president. The goal was to protect musical works registered in the National Library of Peru. In 1996, the government agency Indecopi authorized APDAYC as a collective management society.

In 2018, the composer Estanis Mogollón became the leader of the organization.

== Controversies ==
APDAYC has faced legal issues regarding its management. In 2014, Indecopi suspended the board of directors led by Armando Massé due to problems with the distribution of royalties. In 2021, the institution announced a unified payment system with Indecopi to facilitate copyright payments.
