= Regresa a mí =

Regresa a mí may refer to:

- "Regresa a mí" (Toni Braxton song), Spanish-language version of "Un-Break My Heart", 1996; covered by Il Divo, 2004
- "Regresa a mí" (Thalía song), 2000
