= Chabuca Granda =

Peruvian singer and composer (1920–1983)

OSP Chabuca Granda
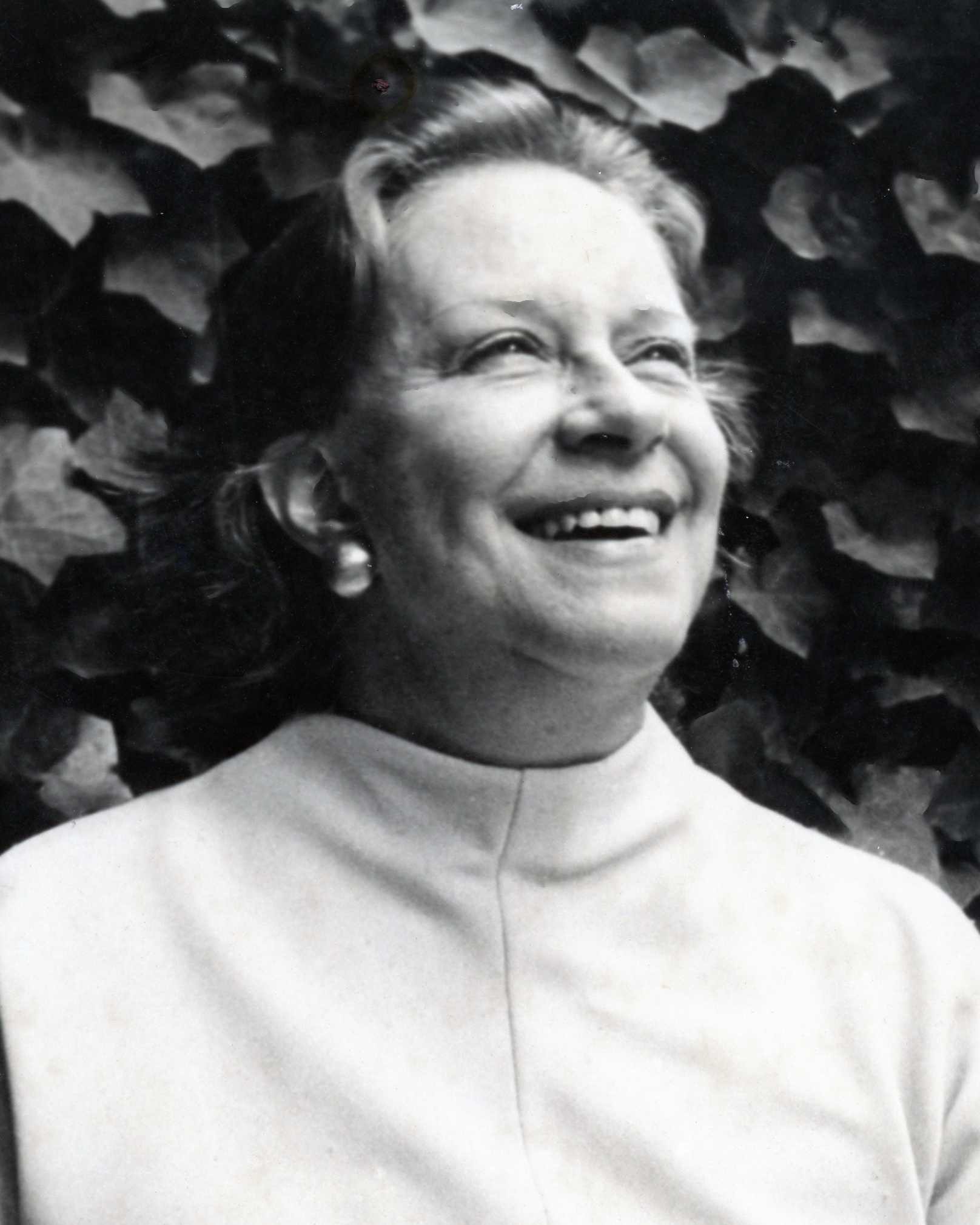
- Chabuca Granda in 1971
- Born: Maria Isabel Granda Larco; September 3, 1920; Cotabambas Province, Apurímac
- Died: March 8, 1983 (aged 62); Lauderdale Lakes, Florida, U.S.
- Burial place: Peru
- Education: Pontifical Catholic University of Peru
- Occupations: Singer-songwriter; composer; poet
- Years active: 1937–1983
- Spouse: Enrique Demetrio Fuller da Costa (m. 1942; div. 1952)
- Children: 3
- Parents: Eduardo Antonio Granda San Bartolomé; Isabel Susana Larco Ferrari
- Musical career
- Genres: Música criolla; Andean music; folk music
- Instrument: Vocals
- Labels: RCA Records; Sono Radio; Iempsa; Microfon; Movieplay
- Website: chabucagranda.com.pe

María Isabel Granda Larco (3 September 1920 – 8 March 1983), better known as Chabuca Granda, was a Peruvian singer and composer. She created and interpreted a vast number of Criollo waltzes with Afro-Peruvian rhythms.

Granda's "La flor de la canela", "José Antonio", "El puente de los suspiros", and "Fina estampa" helped the singer receive international recognition. She has influenced various Peruvian artists such as Susana Baca, Eva Ayllón, Gian Marco and Juan Diego Flórez.

In 2017, her work was declared a Cultural Heritage of the Nation and in 2019, the Peruvian government posthumously awarded her the highest national honor, the Order of the Sun.

== Life and career ==
Granda was born on 3 September 1920, in Las Cotabambas Province, in the region of Apurímac. In 1923, her family moved to Lima, and she started studying in the school Colegio Sagrado Corazón. At 12 years old, she discovered her love for singinging and joined the Asociación de Artistas Aficionados, participating in theatre and opera.

At this age she sang as a soprano (an operation later gave her the deep voice for which she is remembered). However, she wasn't well known until after her divorce, a scandal in contemporary Lima, noted for a very conservative Catholic society. She discovered, and was inspired by, Conny Mendez a Venezuelan composer who sang to her country and to nature. "At that time, in Peru, people mainly sang to broken hearts" she says. "These are songs that never go out of fashion. The miracle of the popular song is that different countries perform it in their own way."

=== Early career ===
Early in her career her work was expressive and picturesque – evoking the romantic and beautiful neighborhood of Barranco in Lima, with its grand French houses with impressive entrances and winter gardens. Some of her most famous songs from this period are "Lima de veras", "La flor de la canela", "Fina estampa", "Gracia", "José Antonio", and "Zeñó Manué", to name a few. She broke the conventional rhythmic structure of the waltz, later broke convention with her poetic cadences as well. Later in her career she wrote songs dedicated to the Chilean Violeta Parra ("Cardo o ceniza") and to Javier Heraud, a Peruvian poet and guerrillero, who was killed in 1963 by the Peruvian army.

Towards the end of her career, Chabuca Granda incorporated Afro-Peruvian rhythms into her work. Afro-Peruvian music, while popular, was not considered "high art" due to the prevalent racism and devaluation of Afro-Peruvian culture. She masterfully blended the suggestive and colorful rhythms into her work, enriching Peruvian popular music.

=== Death ===
She died of heart problems in a clinic in Fort Lauderdale, in the United States, in 1983. Her voice and compositions are known far from the borders of her country, and her popularity has introduced the world to the fine and sensitive character of Peruvian music.

== Legacy ==
Granda continued to make her presence felt a decade after her death, when Caetano Veloso used her song, "Fina estampa", as the title track of an album released in 1994, while her song, "Maria Lando", written with César Calvo, provided the North American breakthrough for Peruvian vocalist Susana Baca the following year.

Granda's song "La Flor de la Canela" has become an anthem for the city of Lima, since it was made popular by the Peruvian group Los Chamas in 1952. Granda worked with several influential guitarists including Oscar Avilés, Lucho Garland, Lucho González, Alvaro Lagos, and Felix Casaverde.

In 1992, a monument dedicated to her was inaugurated in Barranco.

In 2015, the muralists Elliot Túpac and Decertor painted a large portrait of Granda in Lima.

In 2021, the Central Reserve Bank of Perú honored Granda by featuring her on the country's 10 Peruvian sol banknote, in honor of Granda's legacy and in recognition of the country's bicentennial.

== Compositions ==
- Bello Durmiente
- Cardo o ceniza (landó)
- Fina estampa (criollo waltz)
- José Antonio (criollo waltz)
- La flor de la canela (criollo waltz)
- Lima de veras (criolla waltz)
- María Landó (landó)
- El puente de los suspiros
- Ha de llegar mi Dueño (Tondero)
- Quizás un Día Así

== Discography ==
- Dialogando... (con Óscar Avilés, 1967)
- De Chabuca Granda Misa Criolla (con Jorge Madueño, 1969)
- Grande De América (1973)
- La Flor de la Canela (1973)
- Voz y Vena de Chabuca Granda (1976)
- Chabuca Granda (1977)
- Chabuca Granda... y Don Luis González (1977)
- Tarimba Negra... (1978)
- Cada Canción con su Razón (1982)
