= Cardo o ceniza =

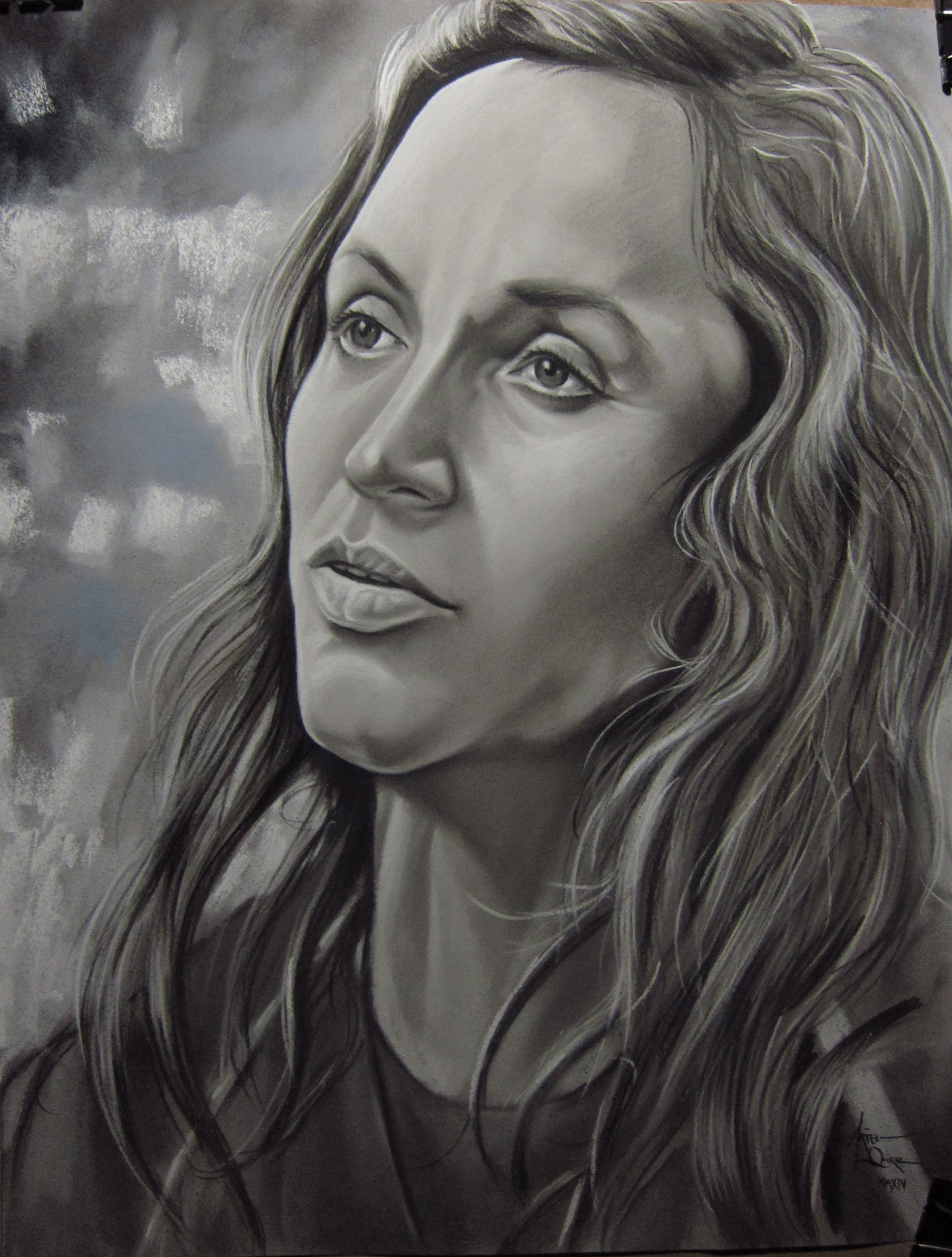
- Violeta Parra

Song by Chabuca Granda
- Songwriter: Chabuca Granda

"Cardo o ceniza" (translated "thistle or ash") is a song written and performed by Chabuca Granda. It was written in 1973 and tells of the passionate desire and shame felt by Chilean singer-songwriter Violeta Parra after being rejected by her lover, Gilbert Favre.

== Composition ==
Granda wrote "Cardo o ceniza" in 1973 while living in Mexico. She wrote several songs about the Chilean singer-songwriter Violeta Parra, who committed suicide in 1967. Granda had not met Parra, but her death had deeply touched Granda who called it an "irreparable" tragedy.

The song's musical composition is in the form of a landó, a sensual and rhythmic style of the Peruvian coast. Singer Tania Libertad, who later covered the song, wrote: "The letter is a permanent questioning; the sensuality and rhythmic division of the landó allow syncopation and spaces where there is room for doubt and lack of answers. That's how great Chabuca was."

The song's lyrics describe the passionate desire and shame felt by Parra over her love for the Swiss musician Gilbert Favre, who was 19 years younger than Parra. Parra's suicide in 1967 has been blamed in part on her love for Favre.

Author Sara Vignolo offered an interpretation on the song: "The thistle is a showy flower with a stem and thorny leaves; it is captivating and painful like the stories of impossible love. The ash is what remains after the burning of all the ships, after the flame of all the dreams; when all the cravings burned in the embers of the flesh ... It is hell of ashamed love; offbeat, lilting, syncopated ... a forbidden dance, a drink joyful and bitter ”

== Lyrics ==
=== Spanish ===
Cómo será mi piel junto a tu piel

Cómo será mi piel junto a tu piel

Cardo o ceniza

Cómo será

Si he de fundir mi espacio frente al tuyo

Cómo será tu cuerpo al recorrerme

Y cómo mi corazón si estoy de muerte

Mi corazón si estoy de muerte

Se quebrará mi voz cuando se apague

De no poderte hablar en el oído

Y quemará mi boca salivada

De la sed que me queme si me besas

De la sed que me queme si me besas

Cómo será el gemido y cómo el grito

Al escapar mi vida entre la tuya

Y cómo el letargo al que me entregue

Cuando adormezca el sueño entre tu sueño

Han de ser breves mis siestas

Mis esteros despiertan con tus ríos

Pero, pero

Pero cómo serán mis despertares

Cada vez que despierte avergonzada

Tanto amor y avergonzada

=== English translation ===
How would my skin be next to your skin

Thistle or ash

How would it be

If I melt my space before yours

How would it be for your body to transverse me

And my heart if I were to expire

My voice will break when it fades

from not being able to speak in your ear

And my mouth will burn

From the thirst that burns me if you kiss me

How will the cry and the shout be

When I escape my life into yours

And how the languor to which I surrender

When the dream sleeps between your dream

My slumber must be brief

My rivers awaken with yours

But, but

How will my awakenings be

Every morning, I wake ashamed

So much love and ashamed

== Recording history ==
=== Recordings by Granda ===
Granda first recorded the song for her 1974 Sono Radio album, Chabuca Granda y ... don Luis González.

Granda again performed the song in November 1977 for the program, 300 millones of Televisión Española. She was accompanied on the performance by Rodolfo Arteaga, Félix Casaverde, and Caitro Soto.

In 1978, Granda included the song on her album, "Tarimba Negra".

Granda suffered a heart attack in 1979 and was in poor health thereafter. She recorded her final album, Cada Cancion con su Razon, in 1980 at the EMI studios in Buenos Aires. She included "Cardo y ceniza" on the album with accompaniment by Caitro Soto, Pititi Sirio, and Álvaro Lagos.

=== Covers ===
The song is among the most popular in Granda's oeuvre and has been covered by many artists, including the following:

- Peruvian singer-songwriter and Grammy winner Susana Baca covered the song on her 2001 album, Gifted: Women of the World.
- Eva Ayllón, recipient of the Latin Grammy Lifetime Achievement Award, covered the song on The Rough Guide to Afro Peru (2002) and on Eva! Leyendra Peruana.
- Tania Libertad, also the recipient of the Latin Grammy Lifetime Achievement Award, covered the song on the 1983 tribute album, Lo Inolvidable de Chabuca Granda.
- Dulce Pontes, a Portuguese fado singer, covered the song on the 2017 tribute album, "A Chabuca", which was nominated for a Latin Grammy.

== Recognition ==
In 2017, Granda's body of musical work was declared a part of the "Patrimonio Cultural de la Nación" ("Cultural Heritage of the Nation"). "Cardo o Ceniza" was one of the works cited in the declaration.

In 2019, La República, one of the two major national newspapers in Peru, included "Cardo y ceriza" on its list of the six best songs of Granda that have represented Peru around the world. The magazine Caretas also included the song in its 2020 listing of Granda's five most emblematic songs.

In 2020, on the 100th anniversary of Granda's birth, Peru's Ministry of Culture published a book on Granda's life and works, written by Rodrigo Sarmiento Herencia. Sarmiento opened the book by naming "Cardo y ceniza" among Granda's four most recognized works, demonstrating her unfading creative capacity and talent.
