= Los Violines de Lima =

Los Violines de Lima were a popular Peruvian conjunto of the 1960s and 70s. The band released 11 albums on Virrey Records from 1962 to 1976, while also appearing with Luis Alberto del Parana and his band Los Paraguayos for Philips in 1966 and on two Orion Records LPs in 1968.

== Discography ==
- Los Violines De Lima 1962
- Los Violines De Lima, Vol. 2 1963
- Limeña 1964
- Una Noche en el Sky Room 1965
- Luis Alberto del Parana y Los Paraguayos con Los Violines De Lima (Philips) 1966
- Puno Ciudad Del Lago 1968
- Audición de Gala del Pasillo Ecuatoriano (Orion Records) 1968
- La Bocina (Orion LP-12.25119) 1968
- Regresa 1970
- Vírgenes del Sol 1971
- El Cóndor Pasa 1971
- Mi Viaje Por América 1972
- India Bella 1972
- Sincera Confesión 1976
