= Augusto Polo Campos =

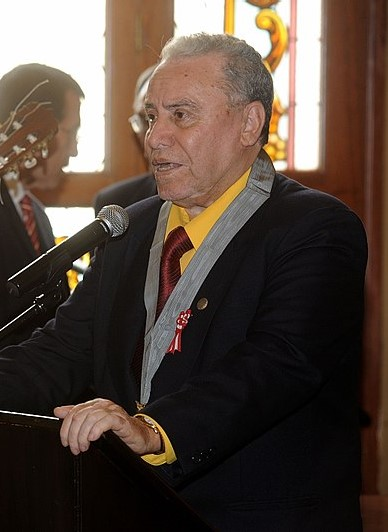

Background information
- Born: 25 February 1932; Puquio, Ayacucho, Peru
- Died: 17 January 2018 (aged 85) Lima, Peru
- Genres: Peruvian music
- Occupation: Composer
- Years active: 1950-2015

Augusto Armando Polo Campos (25 February 1932 – 17 January 2018) was a Peruvian composer.

== Life ==
Born in Puquio, Polo Campos is considered one of the best Peruvian composers of all time. He was author of many popular international hits which represent the originality and richness of Peruvian identity with their melody and lyrics.

In 1933, his family went to reside in the city of Lima. They lived in the historical Rímac District, (also the name of Lima's most famous river). From an early age Augusto discovered a love and ability to recite and compose verses and rhymes.

His home was frequently visited by artists and singers who like to dance and sing Peruvian music, all of which would eventually influence and motivate the creativity of Polo Campos, who not much later would become a prolific and successful career as an admired composer whose songs would form part of the Peruvian traditions forever. He was in a controversy about authorship of the song "Cariño Malo", with Armando Manzanero, and APDAYC.

He never studied music and does not play any instrument, being a self-taught whose talent and intelligence has helped him to create many beautiful songs making him able to obtain a Guinness Record for been able to make a song in less than 2 minutes. One of his songs was included in the James Bond film Quantum of Solace.

He had 7 children, Carmen, Augusto, Selena, Marco, Giomar, Flor and a Cristovals

His vals "Regresa" was a number one hit internationally for Peruvian singer Lucha Reyes, and again in an instrumental form for Peruvian electronic band Madre Matilda. "Regresa" was also the title track of an album by Los Violines de Lima in 1970.

== Songs ==
- Cariño Bonito
- Regresa
- De la victoria a la Gloria Alianza Lima
- Esta es mi tierra
- La Jarana de Colón
- Romance en la Parada
- Cariño Malo
- Cada Domingo a las doce, después de la Misa
- Regresa
- Vuelve pronto
- Si Lima pudiera Hablar
- Y se llama... Perú
- Cuando Llora mi Guitarra
- Contigo Perú
- Tu Perdición
- Morena, la Flor de Lima
- Limeña
- Hombre con H
- Ay Raquel

== Discography ==
- Pamela, Latin ( Bolero ) Peru
