= José Antonio (song) =

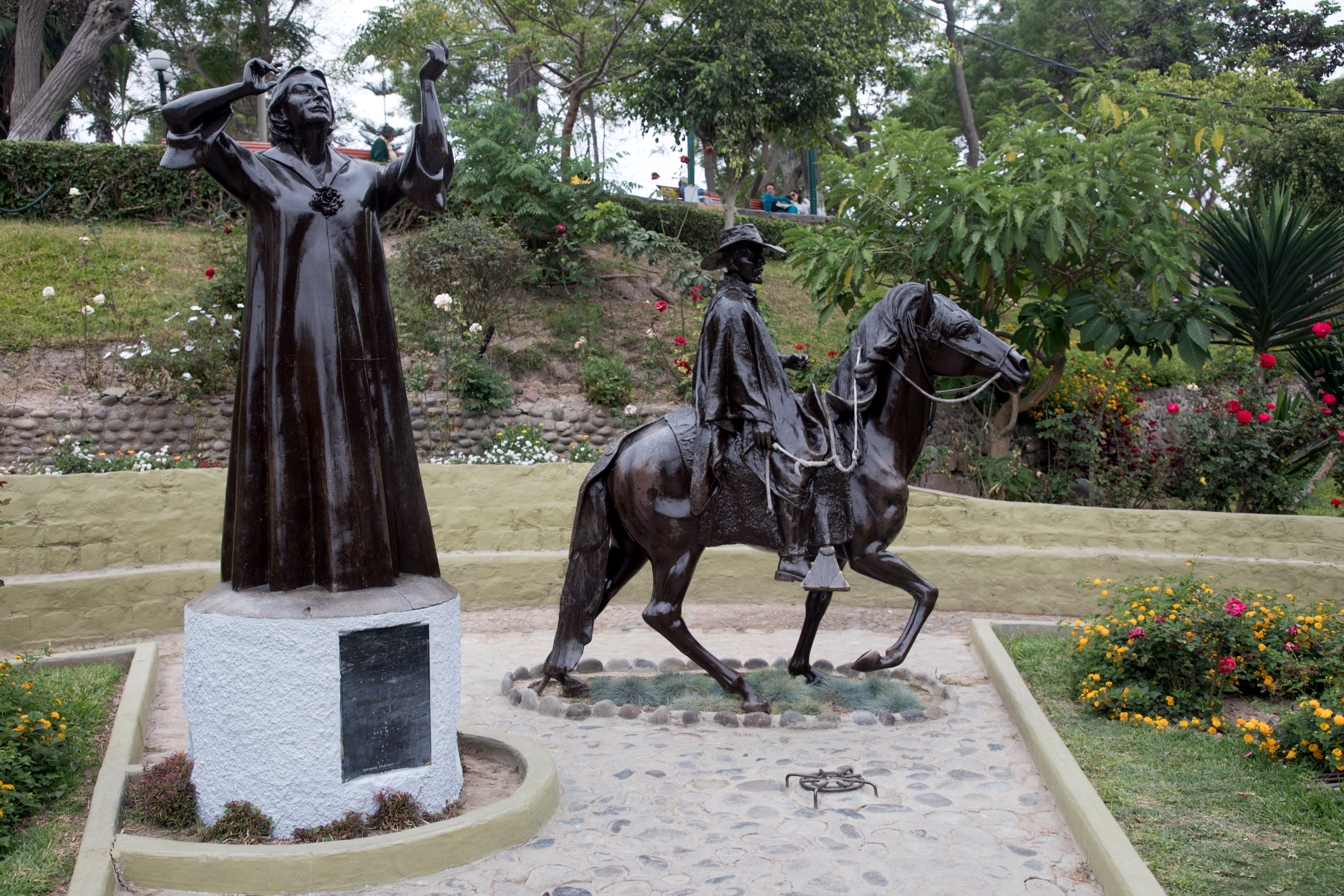

Song by Chabuca Granda
- Released: 1957
- Songwriter(s): Chabuca Granda

"José Antonio", sometimes also known as "Caballo de paso", is a song written and performed by Chabuca Granda. The song is in the tondero style. It was a tribute to friend of Granda's father and horse breeder who helped save the Peruvian Paso horse.

== Composition ==
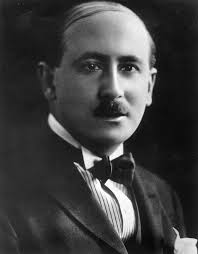
José Antonio de Lavalle y García

Granda wrote "José Antonio" in 1957 as a tribute to José Antonio de Lavalle y García (1888-1957), a friend of her father, agronomist, and horse breeder who was responsible for the recovery of the Peruvian Paso breed of horse. The actual José Antonio died in May 1957.

The song's lyrics describe José Antonio as he rides his horse wearing a jipijapa (Panama hat), Creole Berber, scarf and poncho, and holding silk reins. Later, the song transitions to a farewell to José Antonio: "José Antonio, José Antonio, ¿por qué me dejaste aquí? Cuando te vuelva a encontrar que sea junio y garúe" ("Jose Antonio, Jose Antonio, Why did you leave me here? When I find you again let it be June and garue.").

== Recording history ==
In 1961, Mario Cavagnaro, the head of the "Sono Radio" record label, proposed an album compiling Granda's best compositions. The album was titled "Lo mejor de Chabuca Granda" ("The Best of Chabuca Granda"). Granda was allowed to select her favorite interpreters to perform on the album. For "José Antonio", she chose Jesús Vásquez, known as La Reina y Señora de la Canción Criolla.

In 1967, Granda's international reputation grew following tours of the United States and South America. During this tour, she performed at times with singer-songwriter-guitarist Óscar Avilés, and the pair released an album, "Dialogando" (Iempsa, 1968), which included "José Antonio".

In the 1960s, Granda also released the album, "Voz y vena de Chabuca Granda" ("Voice and vein of Chabuca Granda"), on which she sang her own compositions, including "José Antonio".

In 1973, Granda recorded the song again for her album, "Grande De América", produced for the RCA Victor label. For the album's recording of "José Antonio", she was accompanied by Óscar Avilés on guitar and by Chucho Ferrer on organ. This version was one of four Granda songs included on RCA's 2003 compilation celebrating 100 years of Latin American folklore music, "Lo Mejor del Folklore Latinoamericano: Coleccion RCA 100 Anos de Musica".

The song also appeared on Granda's albums, "Tarimba negra" (Movieplay, 1978) and "Cada canción con su razón" ("Each song with its reason") (EMI-Odeon, 1981).

The song is among Granda's most famous and has been covered by many leading Latin artists, including Chavela Vargas, Tania Libertad, Ginamaría Hidalgo, and Yamila Cafrune.

== Recognition ==
In 1992, the government of Barranco dedicated the Parque Chabuca Granda, which includes statues both of Granda and of José Antonio riding a Peruvian Paso horse, as depicted in the song.

In 2017, Granda's body of musical work was declared a part of the "Patrimonio Cultural de la Nación" ("Cultural Heritage of the Nation"). "José Antonio" was one of the emblematic works named in the declaration.

In 2019, La República, one of the two major national newspapers in Peru, published its list of the six best songs of Granda that have represented Peru around the world. The list included "José Antonio". The magazine Caretas also included the song in its 2020 listing of Granda's five most emblematic songs.
