= La flor de la canela =

1950 song by Chabuca Granda

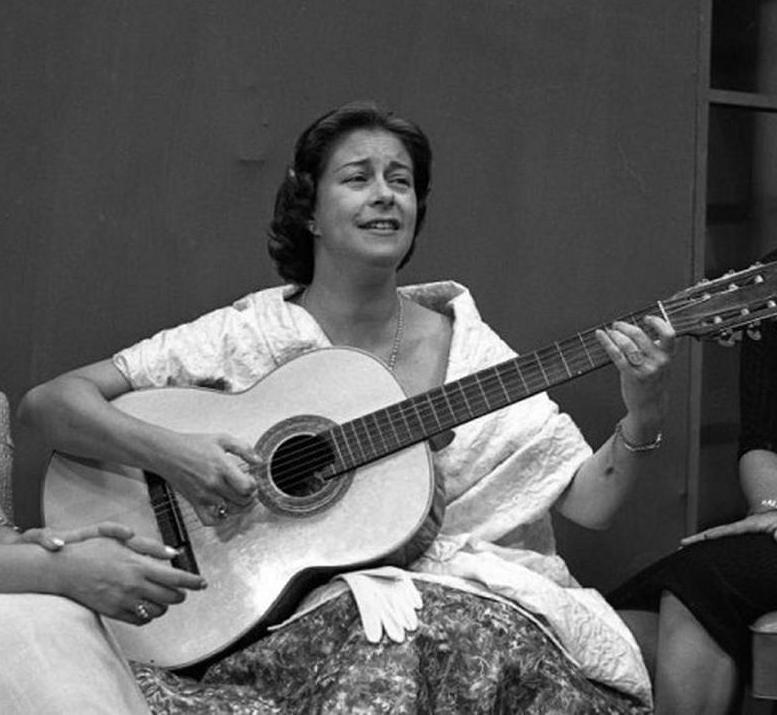
- Chabuca singing in 1960

Single by Chabuca Granda
- English title: The Cinnamon Flower
- Released: 7 January 1950
- Recorded: 1953
- Genre: Peruvian waltz
- Length: 3:21
- Songwriter: Chabuca Granda

Music video
- "La flor de la canela" on YouTube

"La flor de la canela", commonly translated to the English language as "The Cinnamon Flower", is a Creole waltz composed by the Peruvian singer-songwriter Chabuca Granda.

The song was first recorded in 1950 by the musica criolla trio Los Morochucos. However, it would be the 1953 version recorded by Los Chamas, another musica criolla ensemble, that would bring the song and Chabuca Granda widespread notability in Spain and Latin America with over 600 versions of the song being available.

Since then, the song has become an unofficial anthem for Lima, the capital of Peru.

== Other versions ==
=== Notable covers ===
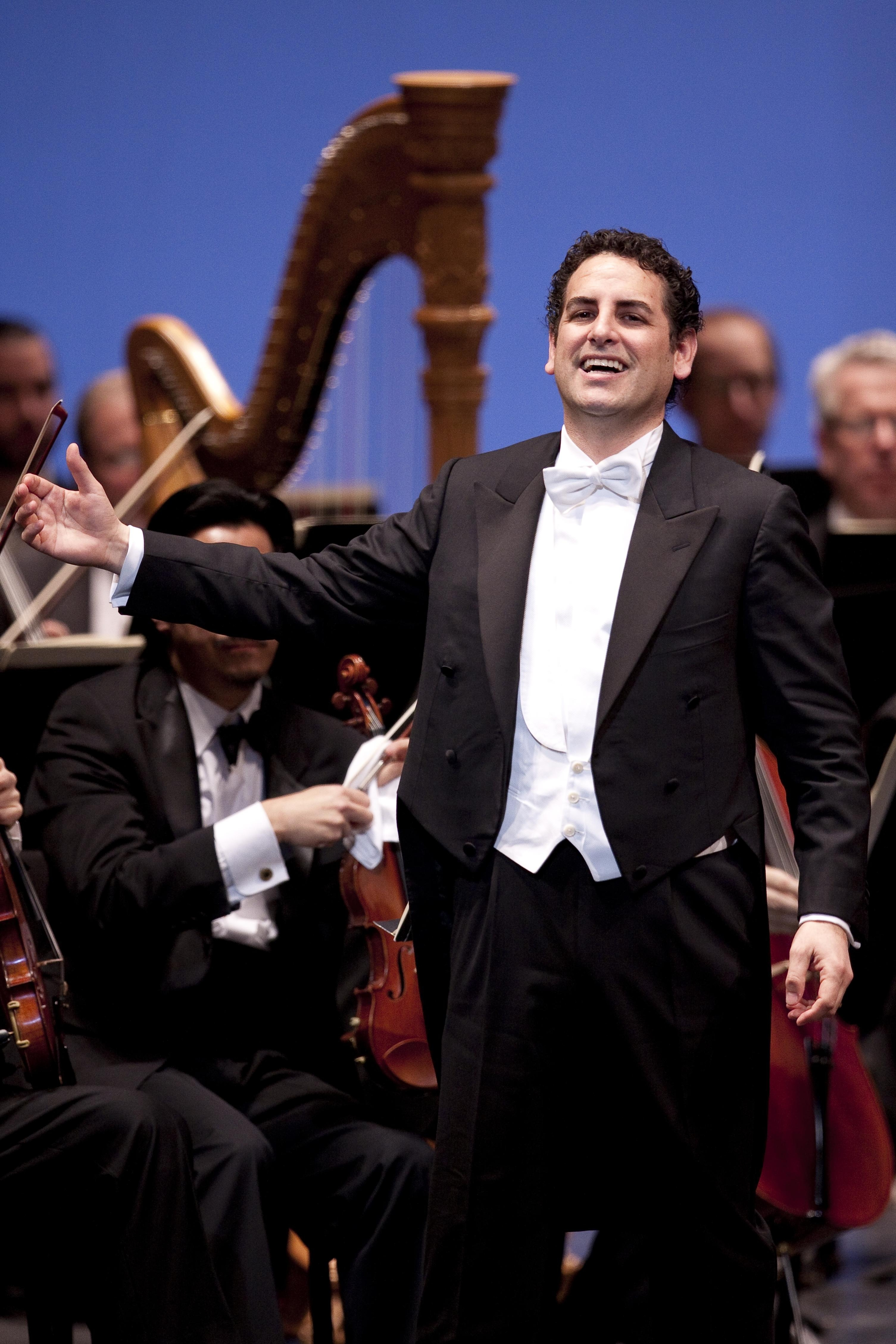
Peruvian tenor Juan Diego Flórez performing at the Washington National Opera, with "La flor de la canela" as the final piece.

In 2013, Peruvian singer-songwriter Gian Marco recorded a cover which served as the lead single for his album Versiones. His version helped the album be certified gold in Perú and became nominated for the Latin Grammy Award for Album of the Year. Gian Marco performed the song at the Latin Grammy Awards that year.

In 2016, Panamanian singer Rubén Blades released a salsa version of the song for the album A Chabuca. The following year, his version received a nomination for the Latin Grammy Award for Record of the Year.

In 2020, Peruvian group Afro-Peruvian Jazz Orchestra released a cover featuring Lorenzo Ferrero for their album Tradiciones. Their version was nominated for the Latin Grammy Award for Best Arrangement. The arrangement was made by Peruvian saxophonist, composer, and arranger Lorenzo Ferrero who won the award for it.

=== Other covers ===
The song has been recorded by a series of other artists such as Amalia Mendoza, Argentinian singer Rabito from the 1976 album "Melodías", Flor Silvestre, Irma Dorantes, Yma Sumac, Lucha Reyes, Eva Ayllón, María Dolores Pradera, Tania Libertad, Julio Iglesias, Raphael, Menudo, Plácido Domingo, Raúl di Blasio, Juan Diego Florez (under conductor Gustavo Dudamel), El Puma, and Caetano Veloso.

== Accolades ==
Year	Awards Ceremony	Category	Result
2017	Latin Grammy Awards	Record of the Year	Nominated
2020	Latin Grammy Awards	Best Arrangement	Won
