= Óscar Avilés =

Peruvian guitarist and composer

- Born: Óscar Guillermo Avilés Arcos; March 24, 1924; Callao, Peru
- Died: April 5, 2014 (aged 90) Lima, Peru
- Genres: Peruvian Creole music, Peruvian waltz, Afro-Peruvian music
- Occupations: Guitarist, singer, composer, arranger, and record producer
- Instruments: Guitar and voice
- Years active: 1939–2014
- Label: IEMPSA

Óscar Guillermo Avilés Arcos (March 24, 1924 – April 5, 2014) was a Peruvian guitarist, singer, and composer.

He began his musical career in 1939, at the age of 15 as a cajón player for the duo "La limeñita and Ascoy". He was known as the "First Guitar of Peru".

== 1940 ==
In 1942, with the string group "Núñez, Arteaga & Avilés" won the radio contest organized by the journalist Roberto Nieves from the newspaper "La Noche", as a result of which he became known as "La Primera Guitarra del Perú" (The First Guitar of Peru).

In 1946 he became part of "Los Trovadores de Perú" along with Miguel Paz, Oswaldo Campos and Panchito Jiménez.

In 1947 he became part of the trio "Los Morochucos" with Alejandro Cortéz and Augusto Ego Aguirre, with whom he would perform intermittently until 1972.

== 1950 ==
In 1952 he founded the first Criollo-style Guitar School which was in business until 1967.

Between 1957 and 1959 he directed the group "Conjunto Fiesta Criolla" together with Humberto Cervantes, Panchito Jiménez and Arítides Ramirez. From 1955 to 1970 he accompanied, with his unique guitar playing, the legendary artist Chabuca Granda on various world tours recording several acclaimed albums including "Dialogando". Also during this decade he recorded the acclaimed album "Valses Peruanos Eternos" in two volumes with Augusto Valderrama Orchestra.

== 1970 ==
During the 70's he formed a trio with Arturo "Zambo" Cavero and Augusto Polo Campos and recorded with many famous Creole artists including Jesus Vasquez, Eloísa Angulo, Los Hermanos Zañartu, Los Hermanos Garcia, Cecilia Bracamonte, Zoila Zevallos, Los Ases de Perú, Los Hermanos Catter and Nicomedes Santa Cruz. He also recorded with the Peruvian tenor Luigi Alva, the actor Luis Álvarez Torres, Spanish Gabriela Ortega, as well as international artists such as Olga Guillot, Leo Marini and Xiomara Alfaro, among others.

== 1980 ==
In 1987 the President of Peru, Alan Garcia, appealed to the Organization of American States so Avilés would receive the title of "Artistic Patrimony of America", also in the same year the Ministry of Education awarded him the "Palmas Magisteriales".

== 2000 ==
In 2000 the National University of San Marcos gave him the distinction of Doctor Honoris Causa in honor of his career and his contributions to Peruvian culture.

In 2005 the mayor of Lima, Luis Castañeda Lossio, awarded him the Medal "Ciudad de Lima".

He died on April 5, 2014, in Lima at the age of 90.
