= Carmencita Lara =

Peruvian singer

Background information
- Also known as: La Reina de las Provincias; La Dama de los Valses Tristes; La Reina de la Rockola
- Born: Julia Rosa Capristán García; 8 October 1926; Paiján, Peru
- Died: 18 September 2018 (aged 91)
- Genres: Peruvian waltz Marinera; Huayno; Harawi; Pasillo
- Instrument: Vocals
- Years active: 1947–2018
- Formerly of: Óscar Avilés; Eva Ayllón; Jesús Vásquez; Los Embajadores Criollos; Víctor Lara

Julia Rosa Capristán García (8 October 1926 – 18 September 2018), better known by stage name Carmencita Lara, was a Peruvian singer of waltzes, huaynos, marineras, polkas and pasillo. She is considered by many Peruvians referring to the perfect music to "drown the sorrows". Obituaries recognized the sharp tone of her voice, her particular interpretation and the accompaniment of the accordion of Víctor Lara.

She began her first steps as an amateur singer at age 15, on several radio stations in Lima, but professionally at age 18. Doña Julia and Don Víctor met in 1948, in Miraflores, when she was looking for a piano teacher. Since then, he stayed with her. Víctor Lara was the one who came to baptize her with the pseudonym Carmencita Lara. At the moment that she had to register in a dependency of the state, Julia wanted to do it with the pseudonym of July García. The official replied that they did not register foreign artists there, implying that she did not like the name. Victor told Julia: – "Put Carmencita just like my mom and we complete with Lara".

She went through all the radio stations looking for an opportunity, until the first contract arrived. The contract was made with Radio Excelsior, on 2 June 1955. The owner of the radio station had listened to her in a restaurant located next to the Plaza de Armas where she went to sing. Her first recording was Olvídala amigo, composition of the iqueño Luis R. Cueto, and which don Víctor had the idea to record. For this they used an accordion, cajón and double bass accompaniment instruments. This at the beginning of the 60s in a studio by the guitarist, Óscar Avilés.

From there they came, Llora, llora corazón, Indio by Alicia Maguiña, singer-songwriter and researcher, who has always highlighted the value of Carmencita for the popular culture. Other tracks she recorded: Clavel Marchito by Armando Gonzáles, Milagro by Augusto Rojas Llerena and El Árbol de mi casa by Salvador Oda.

The couple of artists made a series of contributions to Peruvian music. She ended the stigma that the criollos do not sing huaynos. She was an innovator of the Peruvian waltz, not only in her way of interpreting it but also in the instrumental accompaniment she had. Don Víctor Lara, contributed incorporating for the first time the sound of the accordion and the battery in the Peruvian waltz. In addition, she devised the successful formula of fusing the female voice with the harp. She used ¡Llora cholo, llora y sufre! as the lema in the beginnings of the concerts.
