= Pedro Espinel Torres =

Peruvian composer

Pedro Espinel Torres (August 1, 1908 – November 8, 1981 in Lima) was a Peruvian composer of música criolla. He is best known for his piece El Rey de las Polkas.

== Life ==
Espinel worked in various jobs — messenger, printing apprentice and worker in a wood warehouse — while cultivating his passion for music. He formed small musical groups with guitar and castañuelas, with which they softened bar meetings and fiestas, gaining the love of the Limeño public.

In 1925 he became a member of the conductor Felipe Pinglo Alva, considered the “Padre de la Canción Criolla”. This friendship gave rise to a deep admiration and a great musical influence that marked his style. Espinel learned from Pinglo the art of combining popular poetry with Creole melody, which led him to develop his own style.

== Musical works ==
Throughout his career, Pedro Espinel composed more than 300 songs, covering genres such as waltzes, marineras and tonderos, however, it was with the música criolla that he reached his maximum splendor.
