= Pepe Torres =

Peruvian guitarist and composer

- Born: José Arturo Torres Ventocilla; September 2, 1941 (age 84); Gorgor, Cajatambo, Peru
- Genres: Música criolla, Afro-Peruvian music, Classical guitar
- Occupations: Musician; composer; musical director; educator
- Instrument: Guitar
- Years active: 1957–present
- Labels: IEMPSA, El Virrey, Sono Radio

José Arturo Torres Ventocilla (born September 2, 1941), known professionally as Pepe Torres, is a Peruvian guitarist, composer, and musical director. Recognized as one of the leading exponents of Peruvian creole music, he has had a prolific career as a recording artist and served as the musical director for the long-running television show Trampolín a la Fama.

Known as "La Guitarra de Oro del Perú" (The Golden Guitar of Peru), Torres played a key role in the dissemination of traditional Peruvian music on national television during the late 20th century.

== Early life ==
Torres was born in the district of Gorgor, Cajatambo Province, in the Lima Region. He showed an inclination for music from an early age, influenced by his father, who was also a guitarist specializing in Andean folk music. He completed his secondary education at the Colegio Bartolomé Herrera in Lima.

According to biographical accounts, he made his first public performance at age 13. At 16, after receiving his first professional guitar as a gift, he began his artistic career, recording an album in 1957 with musicians Lucas Borja and Alicia Lizárraga.

== Career ==
=== Musical career ===
In 1962, Torres signed a contract with the record label IEMPSA, where he worked for five years alongside the renowned guitarist Óscar Avilés. During this period, he participated in recording sessions for major artists of the creole genre, including Edith Barr, Carmencita Lara, Tania Libertad, Luis Abanto Morales, Chabuca Granda, and Lucha Reyes.

In 1973, he toured the United States and Europe with the group "Perú Folklórico". Throughout his career, he has released over 15 instrumental albums as a soloist, blending classical techniques with traditional Peruvian rhythms.

=== Television and production ===
Torres achieved widespread national fame as a television personality. He served as the musical director for Trampolín a la Fama, a highly popular variety show hosted by Augusto Ferrando. In the 1990s, he was hired by TV Perú (the national broadcaster) to develop the musical program Mediodía Criollo, hosted by Cecilia Barraza.

In 1971, he founded the "Academia Pepe Torres", a music school dedicated to teaching guitar, which he continues to direct.

== Discography ==
=== Selected studio albums ===
- La Tapa (1971)
- La Tapa Vol. II (1975)
- 25 Años con mi Guitarra (1977)
- En Europa (1979)
- Guitarra en América (1995)
- Peruvian Magic Guitars, Vol. 1 (1998)
- Melodías criollas con Pepe Torres (2003)
- Pepe Torres y su guitarra clásica (2015)
- Guitarra maestra (2017)

== See also ==
- Music of Peru
- Óscar Avilés
- Música criolla
