= Music of Peru =

Peruvian music is an amalgamation of sounds and styles drawing on Peru's Andean, Spanish, and African roots. Andean influences can perhaps be best heard in wind instruments and the shape of the melodies, while the African influences can be heard in the rhythm and percussion instruments, and European influences can be heard in the harmonies and stringed instruments. Pre-Columbian Andean music was played on drums and string instruments, like the European pipe and tabor tradition. Andean tritonic and pentatonic scales were elaborated during the colonial period into hexatonic, and in some cases, diatonic scales.

== History ==
Peruvian music reflects the country’s rich cultural heritage, blending Indigenous, Spanish, and African influences. Pre-Columbian traditions, characterized by instruments like pan flutes and drums, were later infused with Spanish stringed instruments such as the guitar and harp. During the colonial period, African rhythms introduced vibrant percussive styles. Iconic genres like huayno and marinera emerged, highlighting regional diversity. In the 20th century, Peruvian music evolved further with criollo music gaining prominence and the rise of Andean fusion bands, like Los Kjarkas and international stars, such as Susana Baca, promoting Peru's musical identity globally.

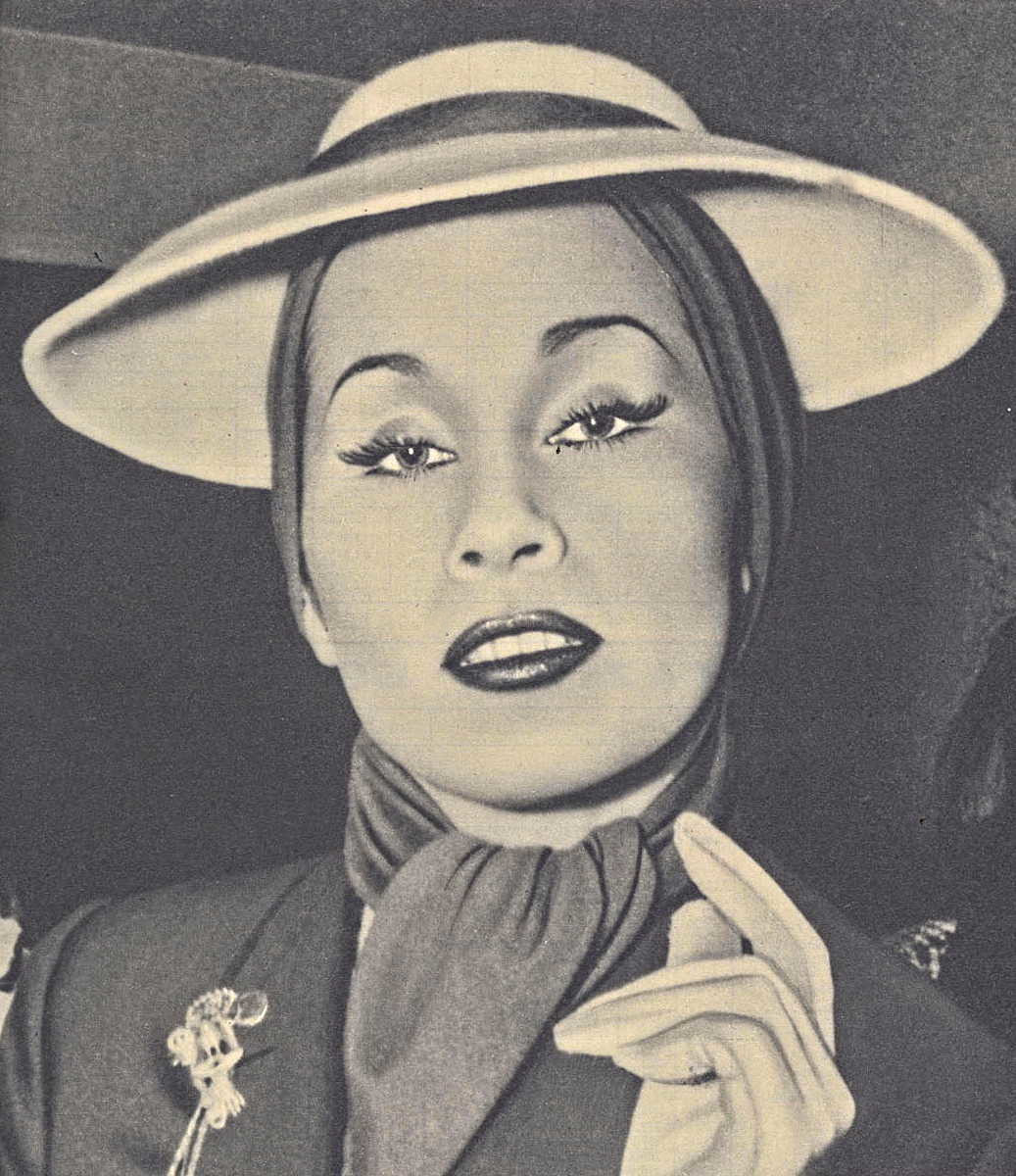
Stories published in the 1950s claimed that Yma Sumac was an Incan princess, directly descended from Atahualpa.

The earliest printed polyphonic music in Peru, indeed anywhere in the Americas, was "Hanacpachap cussicuinin," composed or collected by Juan Pérez Bocanegra and printed in 1631.

== Instruments ==
=== Stringed instruments ===
Peruvian music is dominated by the national instrument, the charango. The charango is member of the lute family of instruments and was invented during the Viceroyalty of Peru by musicians imitating the Spanish vihuela. In the Canas and Titicaca regions, the charango is used in courtship rituals, symbolically invoking mermaids with the instrument to lure the woman to the male performers. Until the 1960s, the charango was denigrated as an instrument of the rural poor. After the revolution in 1959, which built upon the Indigenismo movement (1910–1940), the charango was popularized among other performers. Variants include the walaycho, chillador, chinlili, and the larger and lower-tuned charangon.

While the Spanish guitar is widely played, so too is the Spanish-in-origin bandurria. Unlike the guitar, it has been transformed by Peruvian players over the years, changing from a 12-string, 6-course instrument to one having 12 to 16 strings in a mere 4 courses. Violins and harps, also of European origin, are also played.

=== Percussion instruments ===
The cajón is an important percussion instrument developed by African slaves. People imply the cowbell may also be of African origin. While the rhythms played on them are often African-influenced, some percussive instruments are of non-African origin. For example, of European origin is the bombo, and of Andean origin are the wankara and tinya respectively.

=== Wind instruments ===
In addition to the ocarina and waqra phuku, there are Peruvian wind instruments of two basic types, panpipes and flutes, both of Native Andean origin and built to play tritonic, pentatonic and hexatonic scales, though some contemporary musicians play instruments designed to play European diatonic scales. Of the former variety, there are the siku (or zampoña) and antara. Of the latter variety, there are the pinkillu, tarka, and quena (qina) flutes.

== Dances ==
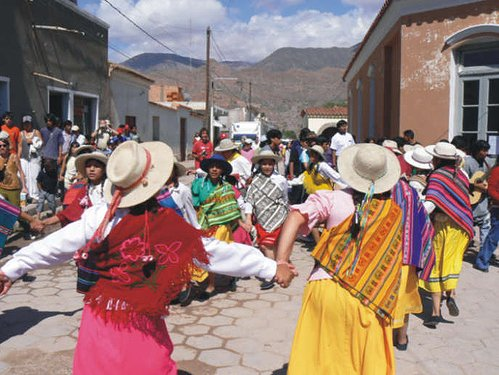
Carnavalito dance in Humahuaca.

- Apiliarg—A dance from the Oporeza area.
- Carnaval en Amazonas—A dance from the Amazonas region similar to the huayno.
- Carnavalito—A dance from southern Peru and the Bolivian Altiplano similar to the huayno.
- Chumaichada—A dance from the Amazonas region with strong Native Peruvian musical influences and strong European dance influences.
- Creole Waltz—A Peruvian adaptation of the European waltz.
- Cueca—A pan-Andean compound 3/4-6/8 dance rhythm.
- Cumbia—A Colombian-in-origin 2/4 dance rhythm.
- Danza de tijeras—A dance from southern Peru.
- Danzantes de Levanto—A dance from the Amazonas region.
- Diablada—A 2/4 dance rhythm from southern Peru, Bolivia, and northern Chile.
- Morenada—A dance rhythm from western Bolivia, mainly La Paz.
- Festejo—A popular 12/8 Afro-Peruvian dance form.
- Harawi (genre) or Yaravi—A highland dance danced to various meters: 2/4, 3/4, and 4/4.
- Huanca (dance)—A dance from the Amazonas region.
- Huayno—A popular 2/4 highlands dance.
- Kantu—A highland circle dance mainly in the Andean Altiplano.
- Landó—An Afro-Peruvian compound 3/4-12/8 dance rhythm.
- Marinera—An Afro-Peruvian 6/8 dance rhythm.
- Polka—A 2/4 European-in-origin dance form.
- Sikuri—A dance rhythm from the Andean Altiplano in southern Peru and western Bolivia.
- Son de los Diablos
- Tondero—A northwestern Peruvian 6/8 dance form.
- Zamacueca—A 6/8 Afro-Peruvian dance form.

== Notable artists ==
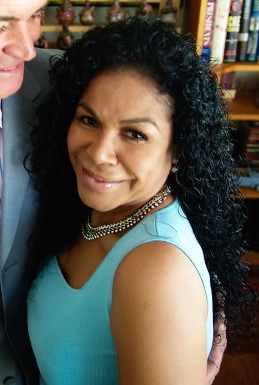
Eva Ayllòn

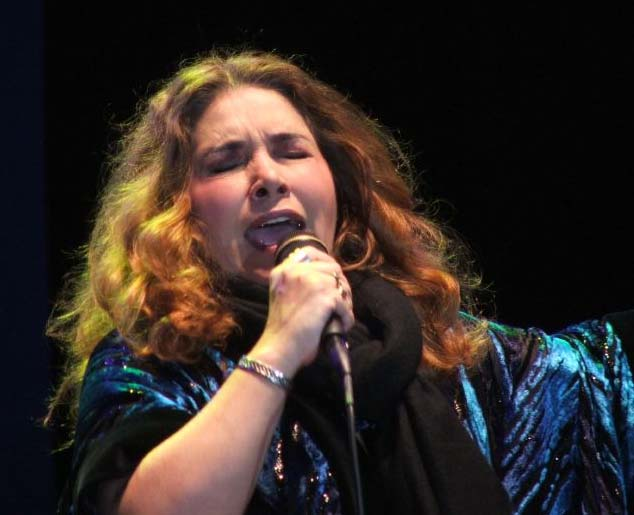
Tania Libertad was named an Ambassador for Peace by UNESCO, Commendatory by the Peruvian government.

- Eva Ayllón, legendary criolla and Peruvian folk composer, ten time Emmy nominee
- Lucha Reyes, singer
- Luis Abanto Morales, Peruvian folk composer
- Gian Marco, guitarist, singer, and three-times Latin Grammy Award winner
- Pedro Suárez-Vértiz, musician and singer
- Arturo "Zambo" Cavero, legendary traditional folk composer and singer
- Francisco González Gamarra, Peruvian composer
- Manuelcha Prado, guitarist, singer, composer, compiler and troubadour of Andean music. He is also known for many people as "The Saqra of the Guitar".
- Jaime Guardia, singer and charango player, performed and recorded as a solo act and with the group Lira Paucina.
- Martina Portocarrero, folk singer
- Tania Libertad, singer
- Tony Succar, percussionist and composer
- Florencio Coronado, arpist
- Jean Pierre Magnet, saxophonist
- Raúl Romero, saxophone and clarinet ensembles from the Mantaro Valley
- Susana Baca, singer-songwriter and two-times Latin Grammy Award winner.
- One important space for Peruvian contemporary classical music is Circomper, the Peruvian Composition Circle.
- Daniela Lalita, vocalist, songwriter, composer, and producer

== See also ==
- Afro-Peruvian music
- Andean music
- Círculo de Composición del Perú (Circomper)
- Festejo
- Harawi (genre)
- Huayno
- Kantu
- Landó (music)
- Musica criolla
- Peruvian cumbia
- Peruvian rock
- Vals criollo
