= Mi Ultima Cancion =

Studio album by Lucha Reyes
- Released: 1973
- Genre: Música criolla
- Label: FTA

Lucha Reyes chronology
Siempre Criolla (1972)	Mi Ultima Cancion (1973)

Mi Ultima Cancion (My Last Song) is both an album and a song by Peruvian singer Lucha Reyes. Both were released on the FTA (Fabricantes Técnicos Asociados) label in 1973. The album was produced by Viñico Tafur.

It was Reyes's final work, as she died in October 1973. She suffered from diabetes and was in poor health which was worsened by her musical career. She went blind in May 1973 and asked composer Pedro Pacheco Cuadro to write a farewell song for her. The album and song were released in August 1973, by which time Reyes was unable to walk. She died two months later in October 1973 at age 37.

== Track listing ==
Side A

1. "Mi Ultima Canción" (Pedro Pacheco)
2. "Quiero Pedirte Perdón" (Ana Renner)
3. "Soy Tu Amante" (Rafael Amaranto)
4. "Por Unos Ojazos Negros" (Pedro Espinel)
5. "Tuya Es Mi Vida" (Juan Mosto Domecq)
6. "Amor De Una Noche" (Pilar Quenés)

Side B

1. "Esclavitud" (Sixto Recavarren)
2. "Asi Lo Quieres Tu" (Pedro Pacheco)
3. "Siempre Te Amaré" (Pedro Pacheco)
4. "Alla Estarás Conmigo" (Adrián Flores Albán)
5. "Locura Y Pasión" (Germán Alva Orihuela)
6. "Que Viva Chiclayo" (Luis Abelardo Núñez)
