= Quipu (disambiguation) =

Quipu is a method of record keeping with knotted textiles in Andean cultures

Quipu or quipus may also refer to:

== Arts, entertainment, media ==
- Quipu TV Ltd., a British TV production company; see List of Scotland-based production companies

=== Literature ===
- Quipu (poetry collection), a 2005 book of poetry by Arthur Sze
- Quipu, a 2009 novel by Damien Broderick

=== Music ===
- Los Quipus, a mid-century Peruvian music band
- 'Quipus', a 1980 musical composition by Gustavo Becerra-Schmidt
- "Quipu", a 2018 song by John Tejada off the album Dead Start Program

== Other uses ==
- Quipu Directory (QUIPU), an implementation of OSI Directory for ISODE, in computer networking
- Quipu (supercluster), a wall of galaxies, a galaxy hypercluster

== See also ==
- Quipué, Greater Valparaíso, Valparaíso Region, Chile
- Kipu (disambiguation)
