= María Dolores Pradera =

The Most Excellent María Dolores Pradera OAXS
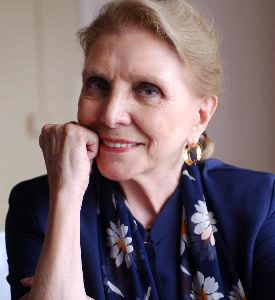

Background information
- Also known as: La Gran Señora de la Canción ("the Great Lady of Song")
- Born: María Dolores Fernández Pradera; 29 August 1924; Madrid, Spain
- Died: 28 May 2018 (aged 93)
- Genres: Canción melódica; bolero; ranchera; folk; copla
- Years active: 1943–2018
- Formerly of: Los Gemelos
- Spouse: Fernando Fernán Gómez (m. 1945; div. 1957)

María Dolores Fernández Pradera OAXS (29 August 1924 – 28 May 2018) was a Spanish melodic singer and actress, and one of the most famous voices in Spain and Latin America.

She started her career as an actress and during the 1950s she started singing professionally, eventually abandoning her career as an actress in the 1960s. She released more than 35 records.

As a singer, she specialized in traditional Spanish and Latin American music: bolero, copla, ballad, ronda, vals, and folk music (Peruvian, Argentine, Mexican, and Venezuelan). Her contralto voice had a deep resonance and sure melodic footing which must stem from classical training. Her pronunciation was pure Castilian, and her music pure Latin American. She typically sang accompanied by guitars, requintos, and drums. She sang for close to 30 years with the same group, Los Gemelos, formed by twin brothers, Santiago and Julián López Hernández, until the death of Santiago in the early 1990s.

== Honours ==
- Gold Medal of Merit in Labour (Kingdom of Spain, 27 April 2001).
- Dame Grand Cross of the Civil Order of Alfonso X, the Wise (Kingdom of Spain, 7 October 2016).
