= Felipe Pinglo Alva =

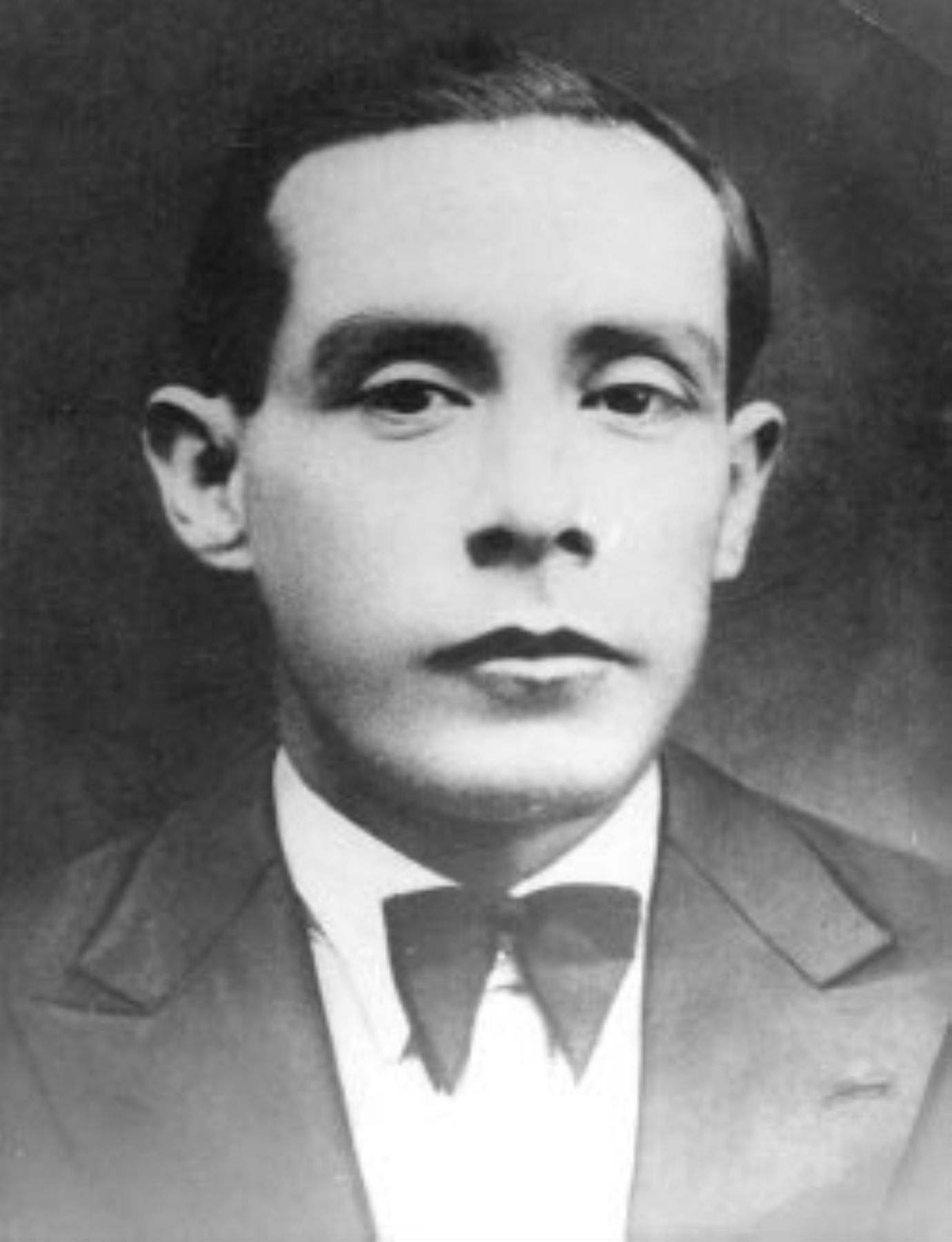
- Felipe Pinglo Alva

Background information
- Born: July 18, 1899; Barrios Altos, Lima, Peru
- Died: May 13, 1936 (aged 36) Lima, Peru
- Genre: Música criolla
- Occupations: Composer, pianist

Felipe Pinglo Alva (July 18, 1899 – May 13, 1936), known as the father of Peruvian Musica criolla and nicknamed the "Immortal Bard" or ("Bardo Inmortal" in Spanish), was an influential and prolific poet and songwriter best known for his often covered "El Plebeyo" (The Commoner). In Peru and Latin America, Pinglo's name is most often associated with the Peruvian vals criollo, which is a uniquely Peruvian music, characterized by the 3/4 time, elaborate guitar work and lyrics about lost love or the Lima of yesteryear.

== Biography ==
Felipe Pinglo Alva was born in one of the oldest sections of Lima (Barrios Altos), known as an historical district with a working class population, to a schoolteacher and his wife on July 18, 1899. Felipe's mother died when he was still a child. The poverty in which young Felipe was raised as well as the instruction received by his father and aunts created a young mind that was both learned and socially conscious. During his lifetime, Pinglo was known as a Bohemian, sickly and frail, and walking with a slight limp. A naturally talented musician, Pinglo earned money as a youth by replaying songs he had heard the local military bands playing by ear in the central plaza. As a child, he studied the works of Rubén Darío, Leonidas Yerovi Douat, Gustavo Adolfo Bécquer and Amado Nervo. In 1917, he produced his first vals, "Amelia" at the age of 18, which instantly became a popular and respected song. He was buried at Presbítero Maestro. For the next 19 years until his death in 1936 he composed approximately 300 songs, many of them lost forever or surviving in fragments only. In 1939, the broadcasting of "El Plebeyo" was banned by Óscar R. Benavides but Benavides claimed it was actually Víctor Raúl Haya de la Torre. In 1957 Rafael Del Carpio interviewed nearly 60 persons who personally knew Pinglo, in an attempt to document his life. The recordings of these interviews were stored in a radio station and over time, deteriorated before any analysis or transcription was done.

The Musica Criolla movement was influential throughout Latin America throughout the 20th century, producing many romantic standards that are covered by artists of every generation and nationality. Pinglo's songs have been sung by such notable artists as:

- Los Panchos
- Los Embajadores Criollos
- Los Chalanes del Perú
- Julio Jaramillo
- Vicente Fernández
- Soledad Bravo
- Mercedes Sosa
- Los Morochucos
- Los Troveros Criollos
- Pedro Infante
- Caetano Veloso
- Plácido Domingo
- Eva Ayllon
- Olimpo Cárdenas
- Julio Iglesias

== Some of Pinglo's Songs ==
- El Plebeyo – The Plebeian
- El huerto de mi amada – The orchard of my beloved
- El espejo de mi vida – The mirror of my life
- suenos de Opio – Opium Dreams
- Jacobo el Leñador – Jacob the Lumberjack
- Oracion del Labriego – Worker's Prayer
- Pasion y Odio – Passion and Hate

== Social beliefs ==
Pinglo's affinity for the poorer classes led to much speculation and innuendo throughout the various political eras of Peru. At certain times, such as during the dictatorship of Óscar R. Benavides, El Plebeyo and other songs written by Pinglo, were banned from radio airplay. It was widely circulated that Pinglo was an Aprista, or that he was politically allied with José Carlos Mariátegui. However, being a Bohemian, it is also likely that he was an Anarcho-syndicalist.

Contemporary writings indicate that Pinglo participated in cultural events organized by syndicalists of the era, such as the homage to sculptor Delfín Lévano in a theatre in the La Victoria neighborhood in Lima.

At different times, governments attempted to slander Pinglo by alleging he was an alcoholic, or addicted to morphine. Contemporary reports indicate that he was a moderate drinker who did not use drugs.

== Biographies ==
- Y Vivirá mientras exista la vida – Recopilación de la obra de Felipe Pinglo Alva, César Abdón Cuba La Rosa and Víctor Elías Arana Zevallos – Peruvian National Library, Lima December 2014 – (Compilation includes many previously unpublished songs, some with only lyrics.)
