= Lucha Reyes =

Lucha Reyes may refer to:

- Lucha Reyes (Peruvian singer)
- Lucha Reyes (Mexican singer)
