= La Morena De Oro Del Peru =

La Morena de Oro del Perú

Studio album by Lucha Reyes
- Released: 1970
- Genre: Música criolla
- Label: FTA

Lucha Reyes chronology
La Morena de Oro del Perú (1970)	Una Carta al Cielo (1971)

La Morena de Oro del Perú was the debut album of the Peruvian singer Lucha Reyes. It was released at the end of 1970 on the FTA (Fabricantes Técnicos Asociados) label (FLPS-86). The album was produced by Viñico Tafur.

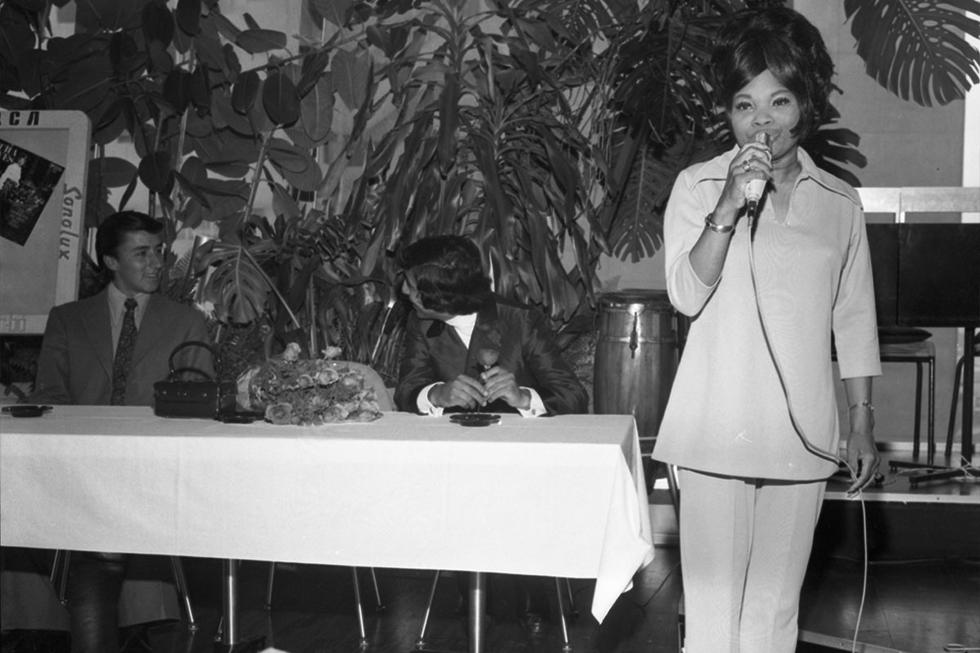
Reyes in December 1970

It was Reyes' first full-length album, and it was presented to the press in December 1970 at a press conference (pictured above left) at the Hotel Crillón in Lima. The album reportedly captivated the Peruvian public.

The album included Reyes' international No. 1 hit, "Regresa", a Peruvian waltz composed by Augusto Polo Campos. The album also included two songs written by the great Peruvian songwriter, Chabuca Granda: "La flor de la canela" and "José Antonio".

== Track listing ==
Side A

1. "Regresa" (Augusto Polo Campos)
2. "La flor de la canela" (Chabuca Granda)
3. "Tu Voz" (Juan Gonzalo Rose, Víctor Merino)
4. "Como una Rosa Roja" (María Gladys Pratz)
5. "Aunque Me Odies" (Felix Figueroa)
6. "Morena la Flor de Lima" (Augusto Polo Campos

Side B

1. "Jose Antonio" (Chabuca Granda)
2. "Qué Importa" (Juan Mosto Domecq)
3. "Qué Cosa Tú Me Has Hecho" (Freddy Roland)
4. "Mi Jardín" (Luis Gálvez Ronceros)
5. "Cariño Malo" (Augusto Polo Campos)
6. "Soy Peruana, Soy Piurana" (María Gladys Pratz)
