= Que nadie sepa mi sufrir =

1936 Peruvian waltz

Song by Hugo del Carril
- Language: Spanish
- English title: "Let no one know my suffering"
- Released: 1936
- Genre: Peruvian waltz
- Composer: Ángel Cabral
- Lyricist: Enrique Dizeo

"Que nadie sepa mi sufrir" (Spanish pronunciation: [ke ˈnaðje ˈsepa mi suˈfɾiɾ]; "Let no one know my suffering"), also known as "Amor de mis amores" (pronounced [aˈmoɾ ðe mis aˈmoɾes]; "Love of my loves") is an Argentine song originally composed by Ángel Cabral to lyrics by Enrique Dizeo. It has been recorded by numerous Spanish language artists such as Alberto Castillo, Julio Jaramillo and María Dolores Pradera. However, it is also known as "La Foule" (French pronunciation: [la ful]; "The Crowd"), a French language version with new lyrics written by Michel Rivgauche, popularized by famed French vocalist Édith Piaf and released in 1957.

== Origin ==
The song "Que nadie sepa mi sufrir", was composed in 1936 by Ángel Cabral, with Spanish lyrics by Enrique Dizeo, both of Argentine origin, as a Peruvian waltz, also known as vals criollo ("creole waltz"). It was a popular genre in Hispanic America between the 1930s and 1950s, and the song, initially covered by Argentine singer Hugo del Carril, became a regional hit. The song relates the story of a singer breaking off ties with an unfaithful lover, yet ashamed that others might find out about how much the singer is suffering.

== La Foule ==
"La Foule"

Song by Édith Piaf
- Language: French
- Released: 1957
- Genre: Chanson; bolero
- Composer: Ángel Cabral
- Lyricist: Michel Rivgauche

Almost twenty years after the song's initial South American release, during a Buenos Aires concert tour, Édith Piaf heard it from the 1953 recording by Alberto Castillo. Piaf recorded a French-language version, with lyrics by Michel Rivgauche, which became a hit itself. Subsequently, the original song was a hit once more, under the title "Amor de mis amores" ("Love of my loves"), the first line of the chorus in the Spanish version.

Michel Rivgauche's lyrics relate the chance meeting between the female singer and a man in the middle of a dense and festive crowd. It is love at first sight, at least on the singer's part, who thanks the crowd for giving her this man. Yet just as quickly as it brought them together, the crowd separates them and she never sees him again. "The crowd acts as a sort of demiurge (creator), like destiny, playing with the human beings who are helpless against the vagaries of chance."

== Notable cover recordings ==
=== Que nadie sepa mi sufrir ===
- María Dolores Pradera recorded it in 1968
- In 1992, Colombian-Mexican Cumbia group La Sonora Dinamita released a Cumbia version of the song with a different time signature (4/4), becoming one of the group's signature songs.
- Soledad Pastorutti recorded the song for her 1997 album La Sole.
- Puerto Rican musician José Feliciano covered it with Mexican singer Alicia Villareal on his 2006 release José Feliciano y Amigos. This version peaked at number 27 on the Latin Pop Airplay chart)
- Alejandro Marcovich recorded a version of this song on his 2024 EP La Gente Como Quiera Baila.

=== La Foule ===
- British singer Izzy Bizu recorded a cover version with the BBC Concert Orchestra, which was used as the opening theme to the BBC's coverage of UEFA Euro 2016
- Richard Carter remixed the song as "Le Monde" in 2023 for the movie Talk to Me
