= Jaime Cuadra =

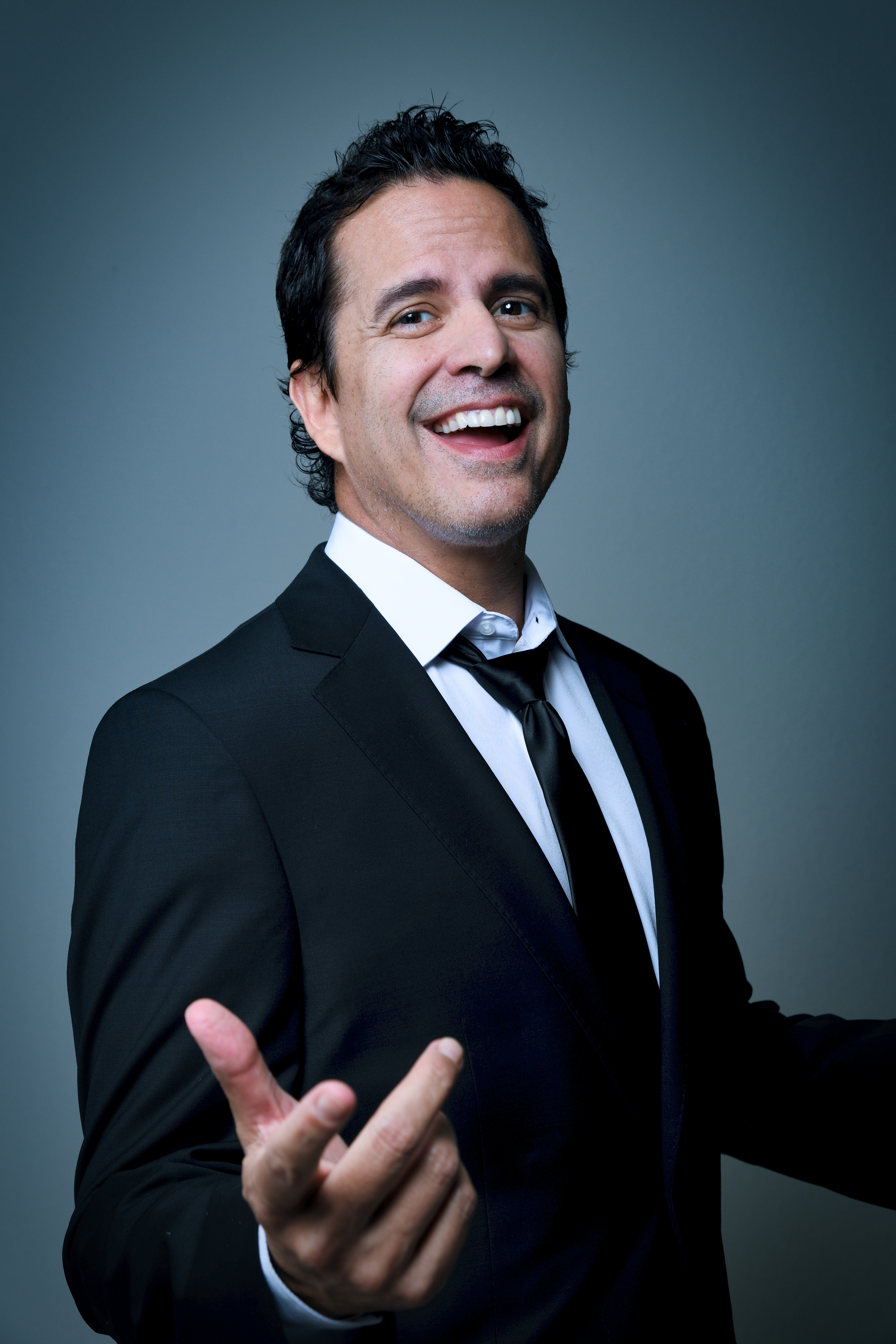

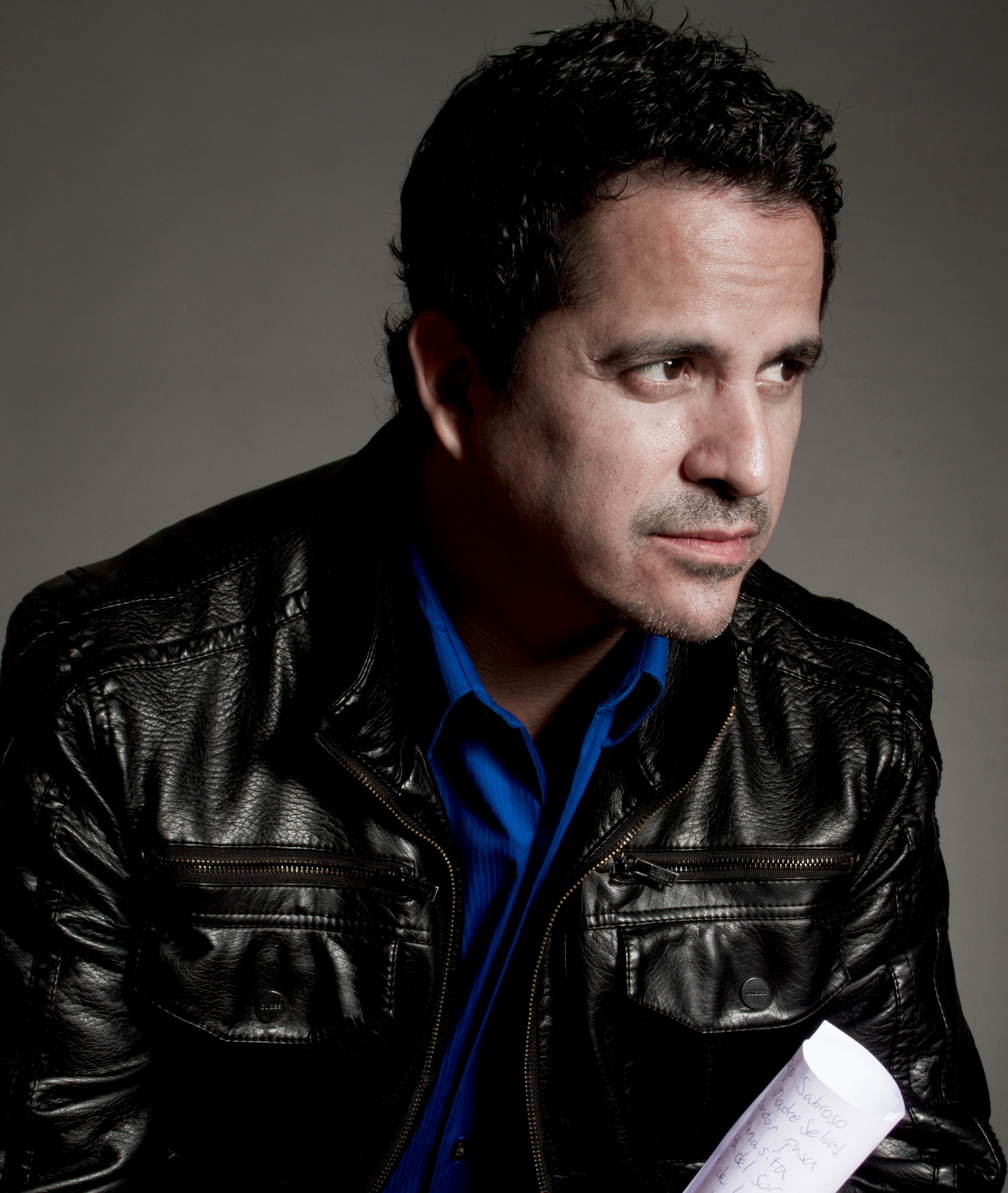
Jaime Cuadra

Jaime Cuadra is a Peruvian singer, composer, music producer, and filmmaker who is known for a number of achievements, including:

Music production: Cuadra produced three songs for the 2008 James Bond film Quantum of Solace. He also released the Latin jazz album Latino in 2009, which won two gold and one platinum record. Cuadra have 12 albums.

Filmmaking: Cuadra directed many video projects with his video production company and composed music for movies, short films and radio and TV advertising.

Cultural ambassador: Cuadra is a Peruvian Cultural Ambassador (Marca Perú).

CEO: Cuadra is the CEO of Quadra Audiovisuals in Florida.

Awards: Cuadra received several awards for recognition of his music career like Independent Music Awards of NY, FIAP Awards, Grand APAP, APDAYC Awards, Gold Tumi Awards, U.S.A. Congressional recognition, etc.

Background: Cuadra has a background as a rock musician, Electrónica and Jazz. In his early albums combined Latin-Pop with Afro-Peruvian music.

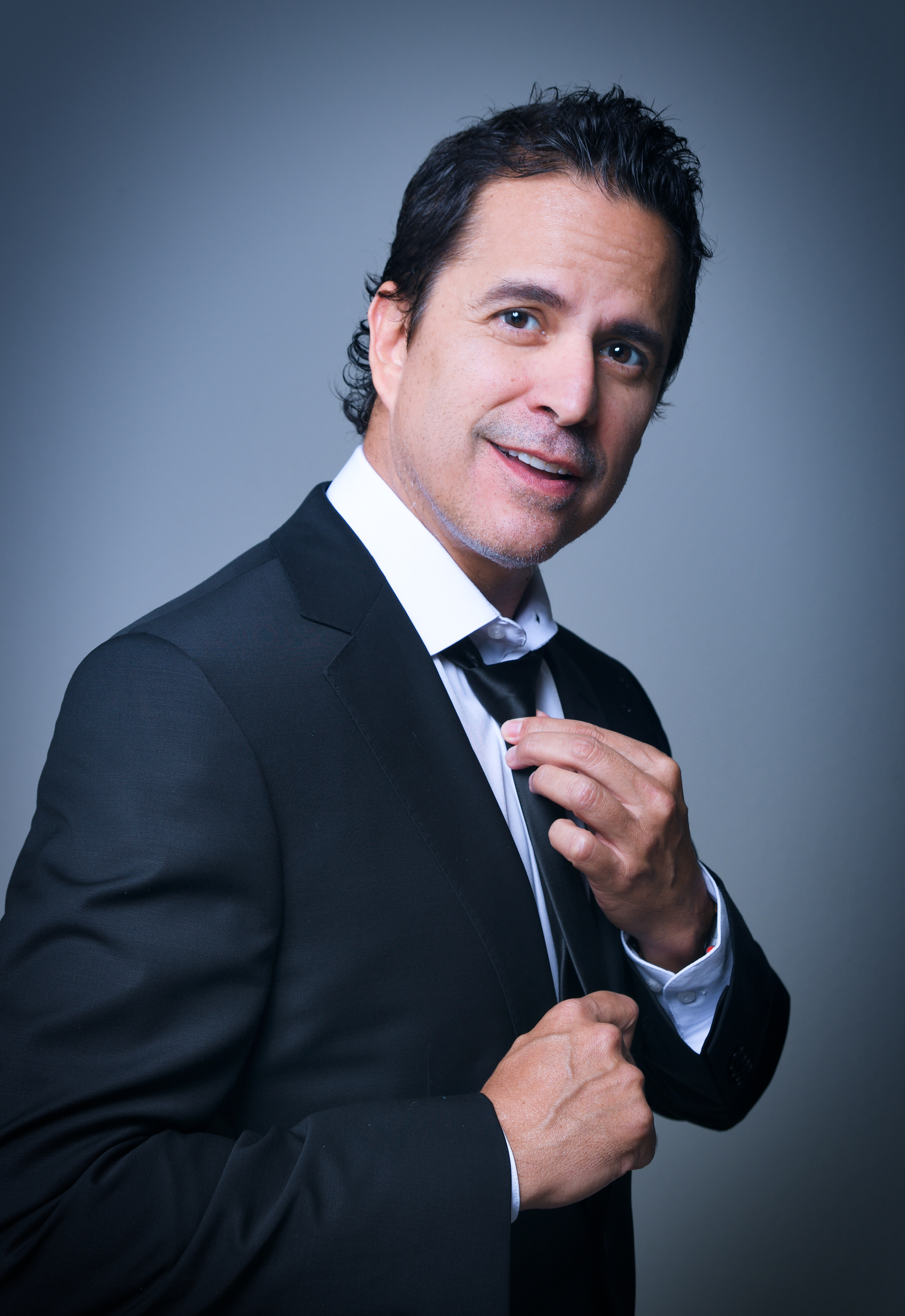

== Biography ==
He went to school at Colegio San Agustín in Lima. He began his career very young in the music industry with his father's recording studio in 1985 as an audio engineer. In 1986, he studied music with Victor Cuadros and Pepe Torres, in 1985 he start his rock 'n roll band called "Graffiti".

In 1988 he studied cinematography / Filmmaking at Robles Godoy Institute; at the same time, he also studied camera and directing and editing at INICTEL. In 1989 he traveled to Vancouver, British Columbia, Canada, to do a course of audio post production and music composing at the Vancouver Film School.

In 1990—1992 Cuadra studied Marketing and Media production at IPP (Instituto Peruano de Publicidad) while recording and producing his first CD as a solo singer, "Jaime Cuadra", a pop fusion of Afro-Peruvian music for El Virrey, for which he won the 91-92 "Circe" awards. In 1993, he studied music scoring and composition with Jorge Madueño also recorded his second album "Baila Mi Son" for the same record label.

In 2019, he accomplish his specialization in Berklee College of music (USA) in "Music Production".

Cuadra lives since 2016 in the United States from where he manages Quadra Audiovisuals his career and projects.

== Career and achievements ==
In 2005 he start a new company called "Quadrasonic Ideas", an independent music label besides his professional recording studio, with this label he produced: "Cholo Soy: Peruvian Waltz Chillout", in June 2006. In September 2006, he won his first gold record, setting a record in sales in the Peruvian market.

In 2008 he composed and licensed 3 songs for the James Bond movie "Quantum of Solace".

In 2009 Cuadra releases in Lima and New York his Latin Jazz album ''Latino'' (Big Band, crooner style) this album won 2 Gold and 1 Platinum Records.

Cuadra was a speaker of the Miami Hispanicize 2017 Convention (licensing Music in movies).

Jaime Cuadra is a voting member of the Independent Music Awards in New York since 2018.

In July 2018 Jaime received a special recognition from the United States Congress for his outstanding and invaluable artistic work contributing to the community. This recognition was delivered by the congresswoman Grace Meng.

Jaime Cuadra releases in 2020 4 Spanish online courses of music industry in Udemy.

Jaime Cuadra is a voting member of The Latin Grammy since March 2021

== New Projects ==
In January 2017 Cuadra launches its first YouTube channel titled QuadraTube where weekly share videos about their experience in the music industry and audio . Quadra Tube – YouTube

In January 2018 he began to produce with Lalo Paredes his new Album following the style of his award-winning album LATINO where he will continue with Latin music standards with his innovative and always fresh style. The launch is expected by the end of 2018.

JAIME CUADRA is currently director of quadramusicstudios.com, he continues producing albums, making live presentations of all his projects and he is composer of music for cinema and advertising.

In 2018 was the Media Director at Nucleus Marketing agency (Florida) There he is producing the podcast "Como llegue aqui" (Hispanic Leadership in the US).

In July 2016 releases his music production YouTube channel QuadraTube.

In July 2018 releases his first album as a composer called "INÉDITO – Wordless Journey".

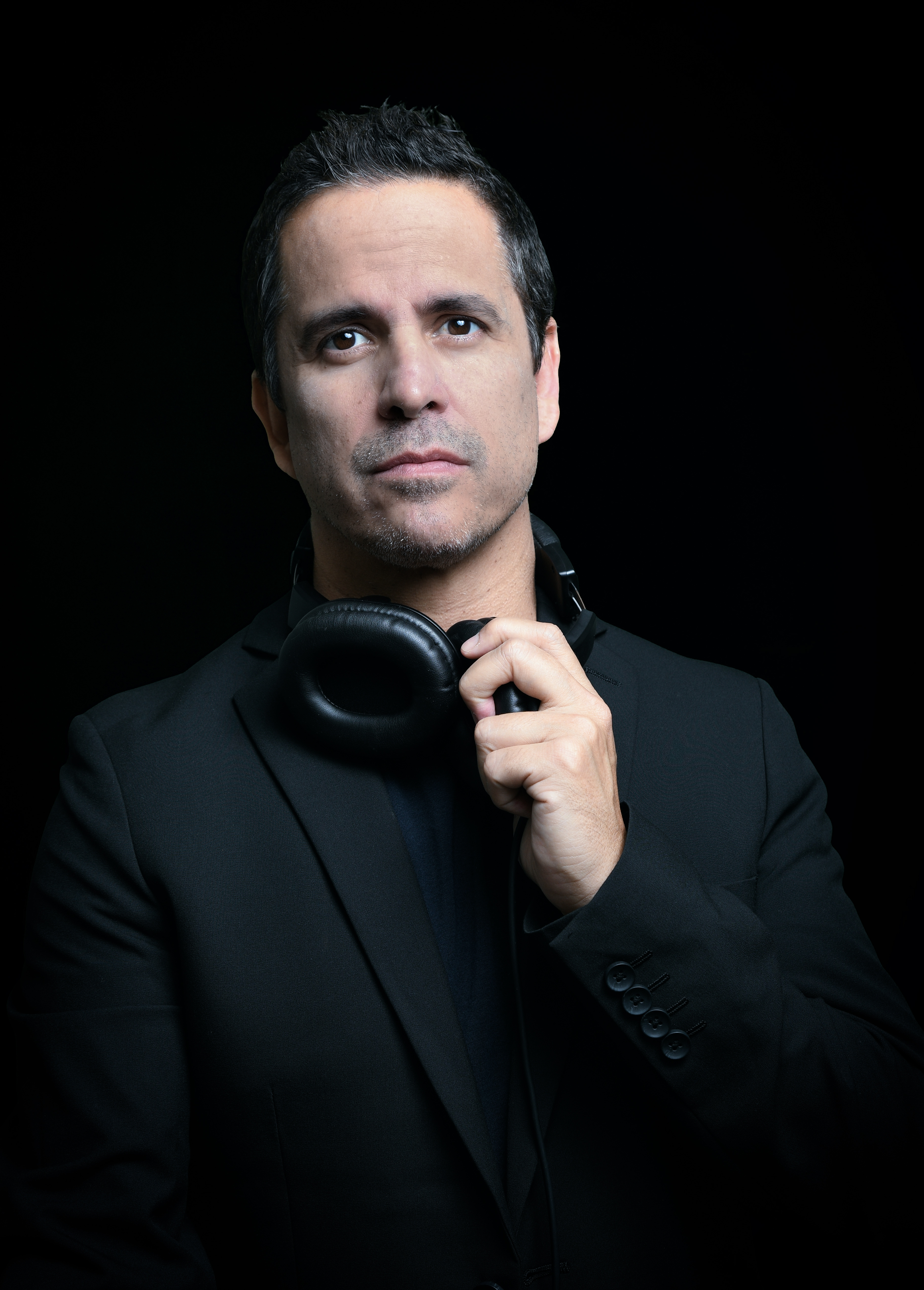
Jaime Cuadra in 2021

In 2019 he had an extra role acting in the new Nat Geo series "The Right Stuff" and the Warner Bros. movie "The Jade Earring".

== Awards ==
- Clio Awards (Quadrasonic Audio AD)
- Ojo de IberoAmerica Awards (Quadrasonic Audio AD)
- New York Festivals (Quadrasonic Audio AD)
- Independent Music Award, Best World Fusion Album for Cholo Soy Peruvian Waltz Chillout
- Silver Lion, CANNES for audio "Duracell" Best Radio AD (July 2007):
- Empresa Peruana del Año Award, Best Recording Studio of the year (2005-2006)
- Indecopi Peru Music Producer of the year (Dec 2010)
- Apdayc Awards Best Music Producer of the year (Jan 2011)
- Miradas Awards Music Producer of the Year and Best Album : RAZA (2015-2016)
- Gold & Platinum Records for the albums: CHOLO SOY, CHOLO SOY 2, CHOLO 3, LATINO, NAVIDAD A VOCES & RAZA (2009-2016):
- Jaime Cuadra y Coro Arpegio a punto del Disco de oro con "Navidad a voces"
- Telly Awards 2019 for the music video Abre tus Manos
- W3 Awards 2020 for the music video Yo Mujer

== Discography ==
Jaime Cuadra – Discos El Virrey 1991

Baila mi son – Discos El Virrey 1993

Cholo soy-Peruvian waltz chillout – Play music & Video – 2006

Cholo soy remixed – Play music & video – 2006

Cholo soy for babies – Play music & video – 2007

Cholo soy 2 – Play music & video – 2007

Cholo soy remixed 2 – Play music & video – 2007

Chill 80s en espanol – Play music & video – 2008

Boleros Infussion – 11 y 6 Discos – 2008

LATINO – Play music & video – 2009

Navidad a voces (Arpegio) – Play music & video – 2009

Peru a voces (Arpegio) – Play music & video – 2010

Cholo 3 – Play music & video/ 11 y 6 discos – 2013

RAZA Andean funkylicious – Play music & video – 2015

Inédito – Quadra Studios – 2018

Abre tus manos (Single) – Quadra Studios – Song produced for CNN Hero 2018 Ricardo Pun who have a shelter in Lima that helps the poorest kids with cancer in Peru – 2019

Yo Mujer (Single) – Quadra Studios – 2019 – song produced for "Vida de Exito" shelter for recovered children of Human Trafficking in Cusco, Peru.

Respirar (Single) – Quadra Studios 2020 – Ft Nesty.

Baila (Single) – Heat Records 2022 – Ft Osmani Garcia & Tefi Valenzuela.

Frenesí (Single) – Heat Records – 2023
