= Kipu =

Kipu or kipus may refer to:

== Places ==
- Kipu Falls, Kauai, Hawaii, USA; a waterfall
- Kipu Rock, Hawaii County, Hawaii, USA; see List of islands of Hawaii
- Kipu Ranch, Kauai, Hawaii, USA; a farm, a cattle ranch featured in the 20111 film The Descendants
- Kīpū, Maui County, Hawaii, USA; see List of U.S. cities with diacritics
- Kipu, Morobe Province, Papua New Guinea; see List of populated places in Morobe Province
- Kipû, an ancient mesopotamian city whose location has been lost, which hosted a temple to Ishmekarab

== Linguistics ==
- Quipu (khipu, kipu), a method of record keeping with knotted textiles in Andean cultures
- Kipu, a dialect of Guhu-Samane language from Papua
- kipu, a word in the Hoava language of Pacific Islanders

== People, characters, figures ==
- Kipu, a Finnish divinity of suffering, a child of the god Tuoni
- Kipuś, a fictional character from the Polish TV show Święta wojna

== Groups, organizations ==
- Kirjava "Puolue" – Elonkehän Puolesta (KiPu), a Finnish political party
- Los Kipus. a mid-century Peruvian music band

== Other uses ==
- "Kipu", a 2010 song and single by Julma-Henri
- Kipu, a mountaineering book by Jan Józef Szczepański

== See also ==
- Quipu (disambiguation)
