= Jesús Vásquez =

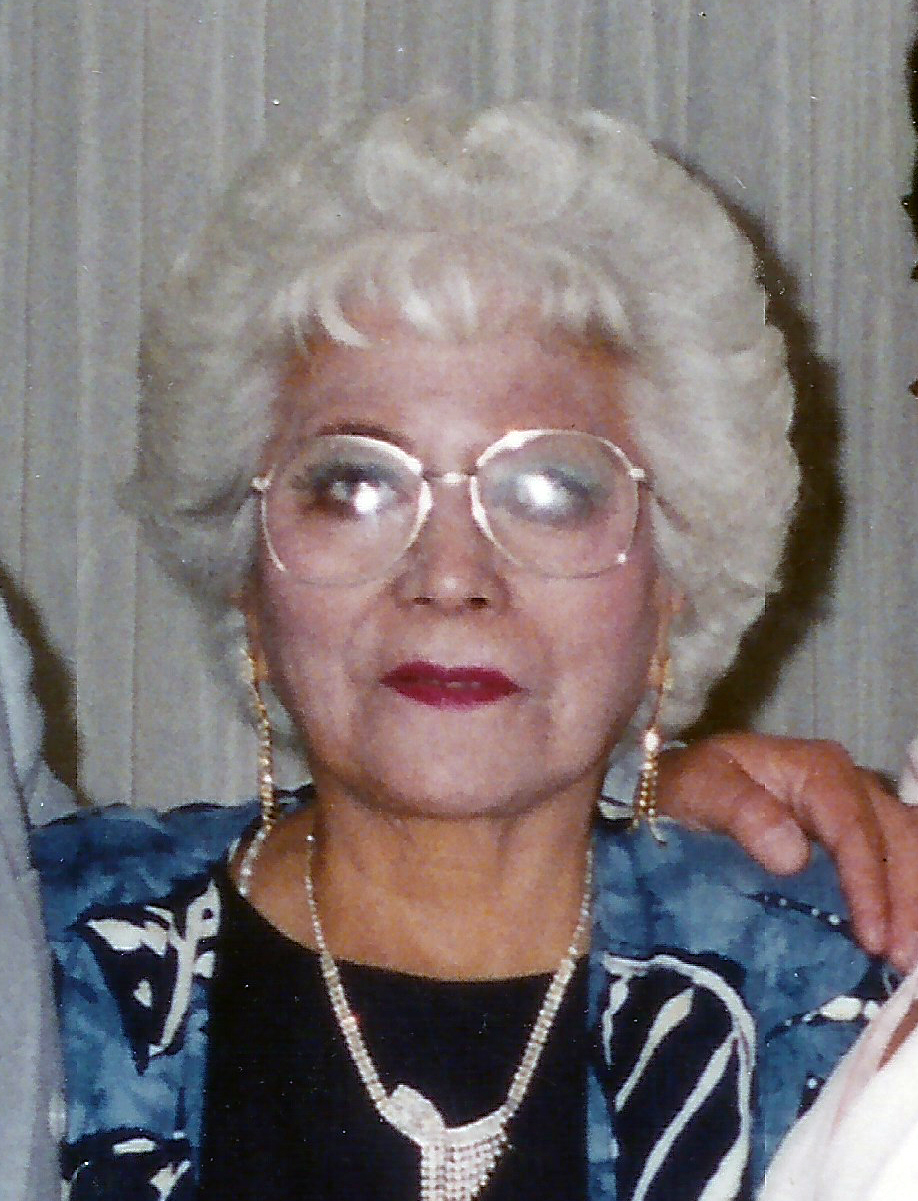

Background information
- Born: María de Jesús Vásquez Vásquez; December 20, 1920
- Origin: Lima, Peru
- Died: April 3, 2010 (aged 89) Lima, Peru
- Genres: Peruvian music
- Occupation: interpreter
- Years active: 1938–2005

María de Jesús Vásquez Vásquez, known by the pseudonym La Reina y Señora de la Canción Criolla (December 20, 1920 – April 3, 2010), was a Peruvian singer.

She was daughter of Pedro Vásquez Chávez and María Jesús Vásquez Vásquez. Her particular singing style captivated listeners, as her intensity had the feel of Peruvian creole taste.

She appeared in some Peruvian films of the 1930s, such as Gallo de mi Galpón (1938).

Jesús Vásquez died in Maison de Sante, Lima. Peruvian President Alan García declared one day of national mourning.

== Discography ==
- Jesús Vásquez con la Guitarra de Óscar Avilés
- Ayer, Hoy y Siempre... Jesús Vasquez
- Los Hits de Jesús Vásquez
- Retrato Musical
- En Ecuador, Canta Pasillos
- Reina de la Canción Criolla
- Interpreta a Felipe Pinglo
- Canciones de Oro
- Mensaje de Peruanidad
- La Voz Incomparable
- La Historia de...
- La Reina y su Corte
- Aeroperú presenta sus Mejores Pasillos
- Jesús Vasquez y Víctor Dávalos, Cantan Juntos
- Tres Estrellas con Enrique Lynch
- En Nueva York

== Filmography ==
- Gallo de mi galpón (Amauta Films – 1938)
- El guapo del pueblo (Amauta Films – 1938)
- Palomillas del Rímac (Amauta Films – 1938)
- Bala de plata (Alfa films – 1959)
