= Los Kipus =

Peruvian musical group

Los Kipus in 1979, Genaro Ganoza, Carmen Montoro, Paco Maceda

Los Kipus or Los Quipus, were a Peruvian musical group. Los Kipus were highly influenced by música criolla. The style of music, known as vals criollo, is evident throughout their work. Los Kipus were originally formed in 1959 and consisted of group members Paco Maceda, Genaro Ganoza, and Carmen Montoro. Throughout the years Los Kipus had numerous female lead singers, including Eva Ayllon from 1973 to 1975. Others included Zoraida Villanueva, Charo Alonso, and Pilar Valdivia.

Los Kipus were a popular musical group in Peru throughout the 1960s and 1970s. Popular hits written by Los Kipus included "Perdiste," "Cariñito," and "Nada soy." Apart from playing original songs, Los Kipus also performed vals created by other writers. Some popular ones included "Ansias" by Luis Abelardo Núñez and "Amorcito" by Lucas Borja.

== History ==
Paco Maceda was born on January 15, 1933, in the Peruvian province of Piura. At 16 years old, Maceda first started experimenting with guitars and the vals criollo genre. In 1954, Maceda, along with Juan Jiron and Juan Ruiz, formed "Los Ruiseñores." In 1955, Paco Maceda teamed up with Luis Abanto Morales to write the hit song "Nunca Podran."

Genaro Ganoza Torres, co-founder of Los Kipus, was born on July 10, 1931. He was born in Viru, a province of Trujillo in Peru. Ganoza is credited with co-writing the song "Nada Soy."

In 1959, Maceda, Ganoza, and Carmen Montoro formed the trio Los Kipus. In August 1959 their first song, "Por que sigues llorando" was written with assistance from Rafael Otero.

Despite numerous changes to the female lead, the band always consisted of two acoustic guitars, a female voice lead, and native Peruvian percussion instruments. Eva Ayllón, in later interviews, described Maceda and Ganoza as "very important Creole guitarists and composers" who had "a way of making the strings cry that is very unique."

As the band leader and manager, Maceda took Los Kipus throughout South America in the 1960s and 1970s. In 1992, Maceda moved to the United States and settled in Florida until his death on April 23, 2004, from liver cancer. Ganoza died on December 15, 2016. Los Kipus continue to tour as of today with Paco Maceda Jr. as lead guitarist.

== Discography ==
- Éxitos de Siempre
- Los Kipus y Sus Voces
- Carmen, Paco y Genaro
- Retorno Triunfal
