= Alicia Maguiña =

Peruvian singer (1938–2020)

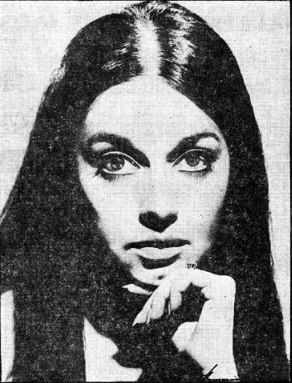
Photo taken on 1969

Alicia Rosa Maguiña Málaga (28 November 1938 – 14 September 2020) was a Peruvian composer and singer linked to Peruvian waltz music. Her song Indio is said to express her solidarity with indigenous Peruvians and their suffering.
