= Luis Abanto Morales =

- Born: 25 August 1923
- Origin: Trujillo, Peru
- Died: 14 June 2017 (aged 93) Lima, Peru
- Years active: 1942 - 2017

Luis Abanto Morales (25 August 1923 – 14 June 2017) was a Peruvian singer and composer.

== Early life and education ==
Morales was born in Trujillo, Peru on August 25, 1923. His childhood was spent in Cajabamba where, after his father died, he was cared for by his paternal grandmother. His studied at the 113 school.

When Morales was 13 years old his mother, doña Rosa, brought him to Lima, and they moved to the Tingüa passage in the District of Lince. Later he took electricity training in the Salesians Catholic School.

== Career ==
His career began in 1942 when he won the "Districts Song" contest sponsored by Radio Callao. Later, Morales became a singer and composer of traditional Peruvian music. Some of his songs carry a strong message about social conflicts and national identity, and others about love and life. Perhaps his most famous songs are "Cholo soy", "Heaven Serrano", "La Pitita", "Love me", among others. He regularly travels to Brazil, the United States and some European countries, where the Peruvian expatriates keep requesting his presence.

Morales was one of the first converts to the Church of Jesus Christ of Latter-day Saints in Peru.

== Death ==
He died in 2017, at the age of 93, in Edgardo Rebagliati Hospital, where he had been hospitalized for several months due to a bladder tumor. He was buried on Parque del Recuerdo cemetery in Lurín

In 2021, children of Abanto demanded that the song Cholo soy y no me compassionas be stopped being used without authorization after Free Peru used it in one of their promos.

== Discography ==
- Cholo
- Nunca podrán
- Payaso
- Trujillano
