= Eva Ayllón =

Peruvian composer and singer

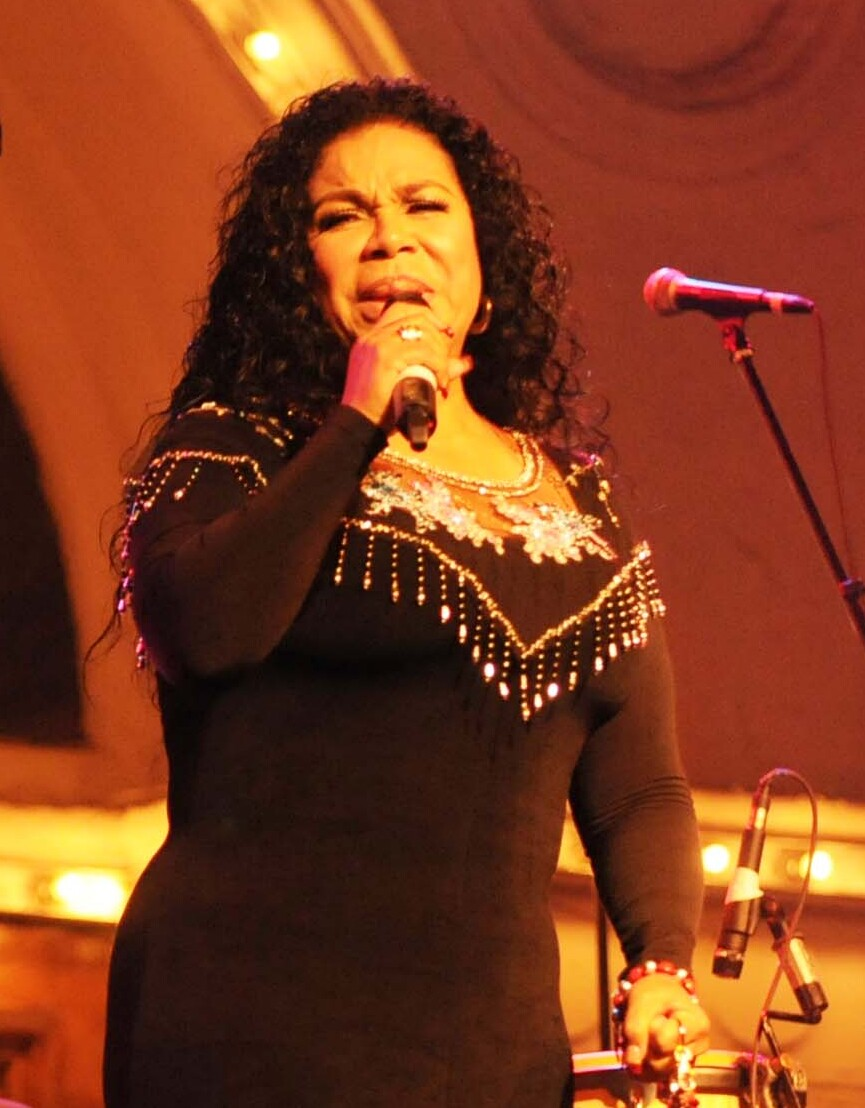
- Ayllón in 2011

Background information
- Born: Eva María Angélica Ayllón Urbina; 7 February 1956 (age 70); Lima, Peru
- Occupations: Singer; songwriter; record producer
- Years active: 1973—present
- Musical career
- Genres: música criolla; folk; cumbia; Landó; Peruvian waltz; Festejo
- Instrument: Vocals
- Label: Latin
- Formerly of: Los Kipus
- Website: www.evaayllon.com.pe

Eva María Angélica Ayllón Urbina (born February 7, 1956), is a female composer and singer, one of Peru's foremost Afro-Peruvian musicians, and one of the country's most enduring living legends. She held the record for most nominations without a winning the Latin Grammy Award for Best Folk Album. In 2019, she received the Latin Grammy Lifetime Achievement Award.

Also known as La Reina del Landó ("The Queen of Landó"), Ayllón is a winner of the Latin Grammy for Musical Excellence for her contribution to Peruvian culture, and has been nominated ten times for Best Folk Album. Considered one of the icons of Creole and musica criolla, Ayllón also ventured into various musical genres and collaborated with a number of prominent artists such as Gilberto Santa Rosa, Soledad Pastorutti, Marc Anthony, Armando Manzanero, Raphael, Diego el Cigala, and José Luis Rodríguez.

With an uninterrupted singing career of nearly 50 years, Ayllón is considered one of the greatest icons of the traditional Peruvian music.

== Early life ==
Ayllón was raised in a traditional Limeño family with her maternal grandmother. Ayllón adopted the stage name "Eva" from her maternal grandmother, Eva, who initiated her in vocalization at the age of three. As a child and teen, Eva Ayllón sang in school competitions and later on television and radio. Throughout the early 1970s, Eva appeared in many música criolla musical groups (locally called "peñas criollas") such as Rinconcito Monsefuano, La peña de los Ugarte, Los Mundialistas o Callejón and Los Kipus. Ayllón sang as the lead voice in this popular trio from 1973 through 1975, eventually leaving the group to pursue a solo career.

== Career ==
In 1979, Ayllón began touring internationally, with appearances in Europe, the United States, Canada, and Japan and since then her music and live performances are requested on a yearly basis at international music events. In 1989, Ayllón was invited to join Los Hijos del Sol, a supergroup made up of Peruvian musical stars, developed by producer Ricardo Ghibellini in an effort to promote Peruvian music through performance and recording. She represented Peru in the OTI Festival 1991 with the song "Enamorado de estar aquí" along Fahed Mitre.

Ayllón released her first US album, Eva! Leyenda Peruana, on Times Square Records in 2004. Since then, Ayllón's musical presence continues to expand boundaries. In her commitment to broaden the awareness of Afro-Peruvian culture, Ayllón changed her residence from Lima, Peru to New Jersey that same year. Leyenda Peruana gained praise and recognition in different latitudes, and in Germany it received the Critic's Choice Award for Best Traditional Recording.

In 2007, Ayllón participated as a judge at Latin America's largest music festival, the Viña del Mar International Song Festival. In April, Ayllón released a live concert DVD recording titled Live from Hollywood.

Ayllón has produced over 30 records, and nominated ten times for the Latin Grammy. Her latest release, "48 años después", is a compilation of her greatest hits, and revisits the musical styles that she has performed over the last four decades. In 2008, she performed at a sold out Carnegie Hall on November 8 in New York.

== Discography ==
- Kipus y Eva (Iempsa, 1977)
- Esta noche (Sonodisc 1979)
- Al ritmo de Eva Ayllón (Sono Radio, 1980)
- Señoras y señores (Sono Radio, 1981)
- Cuando hacemos el amor (Sono Radio, 1982)
- Eva Ayllón (CBS, 1983)
- Eva Ayllón en escena (CBS, 1984)
- Para mi gente (CBS, 1985)
- Para Todos (CBS, 1986)
- Huellas (CBS, 1987)
- Landó de la vida y yo (Sono Radio, 1989)
- Eva siempre Eva (Sono Sur, 1990)
- Concierto de gala en vivo (Discos Independientes, 1992)
- Gracias a la vida (Discos Independientes, 1993)
- Para tenerte (Discos Independientes, 1994)
- 25 años, 25 éxitos (Discos Independientes, 1995)
- Ritmo color y sabor (Discos Independientes, 1996)
- Amanecer en ti (Discos Independientes, 1998)
- Juntos llevamos la Paz (Pro Estudios, 1999)
- 30 años en Vivo (Iempsa, 2000)
- Eva (Sony 2002)
- Eva! Leyenda Peruana (Times Square Records, 2004)
- Live From Hollywood DVD (NIDO Entertainment, 2007)
- Kimba Fá (Times Square Records, 2008)
- Canta A Chabuca Granda (SURA MUSIC S.R.L, 2009)
- Celebra 40 Años Enamorada Del Perú
- Eva + Inti Illimani Histórico (Macondo Koncerte, 2009)
- Como la primera vez (Aylloncito Producciones, 2014)
- Un Bolero Un Vals 1 (Aylloncito Producciones, 2015)
- Clavo y Canela (Aylloncito Producciones, 2017)
- Sencillamente Eva (Aylloncito Producciones, 2018)
- 48 Años después (Aylloncito Producciones, 2018)
- Un Bolero Un Vals 2 (Aylloncito Producciones, 2019)
- Quédate en casa (Aylloncito Producciones, 2021)
- Esta Noche - Versión Eva (Aylloncito Producciones, 2021)
- Al Ritmo De Eva Ayllón - Versión Eva (Aylloncito Producciones, 2022)
- Señoras y Señores - Versión Eva (Aylloncito Producciones, 2022)
- Cuando Hacemos el Amor - Versión Eva (Aylloncito Producciones, 2022)
- En Escena - Versión Eva (Aylloncito Producciones, 2022)
- Para mi gente - Versión Eva (Aylloncito Producciones, 2022)
- Para Todos - Versión Eva (Aylloncito Producciones, 2022)
- Huellas - Versión Eva (Aylloncito Producciones, 2022)
- Con amor y fe por mi Perú - En Vivo (Aylloncito Producciones, 2022)
- Landó de la vida y yo - Versión Eva (Aylloncito Producciones, 2022)

== See also ==
- List of Afro-Latinos
