= Chinlili =

String instrument
- Other names: Chinlilo
- Classification: String instrument
- Hornbostel–Sachs classification: (Composite chordophone)
- Developed: Peru

Related instruments
- Khonkhota, Charango

The Chinlili, also known as the Chinlilo, is a chordophone from Ayacucho, Peru. It is a variant of the Charango tuned to a lower tone. The frets are laid out diatonically, and it has 6 courses of 8 metal strings much like a dulcimer. The doubled courses on the instrument are tuned to an octave. The traditional tuning, known as the "temple tuning" of the courses is E - B - G - D - B - G. The Chinlili was prevalent in Chimaycha songs which portrayed scenes about courtship, love or poverty using metaphors from nature. Historically, the performers were herders who would meet while herding and compose music together. Current indigenous music in cities focuses on social problems and partying. The music is still a forum for people to connect through common issues, but those issues have changed.

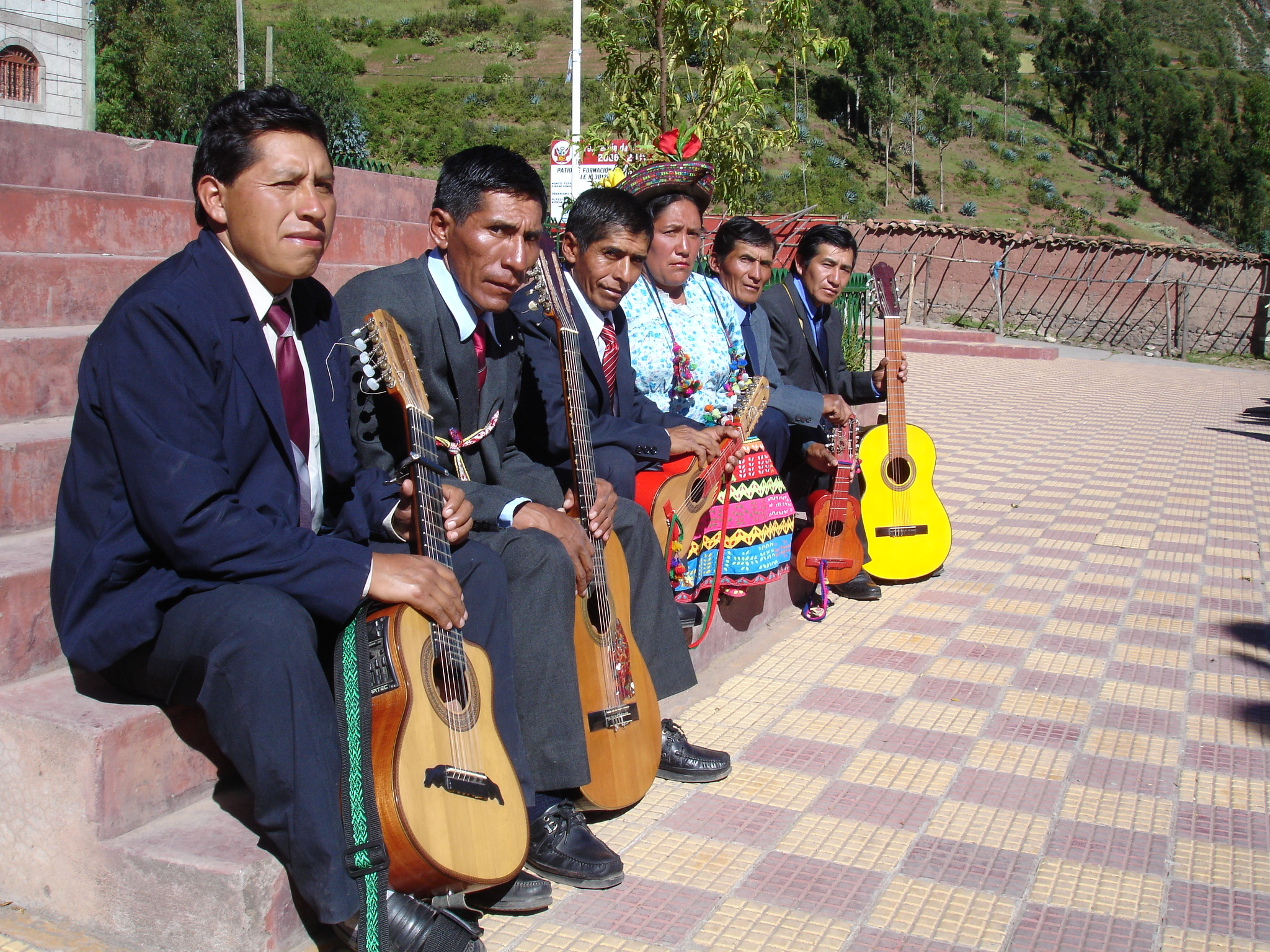
A group of musicians from Peru. The two smaller instruments with diatonic fretting are Chinlilis.
