= Zamacueca =

Music genre

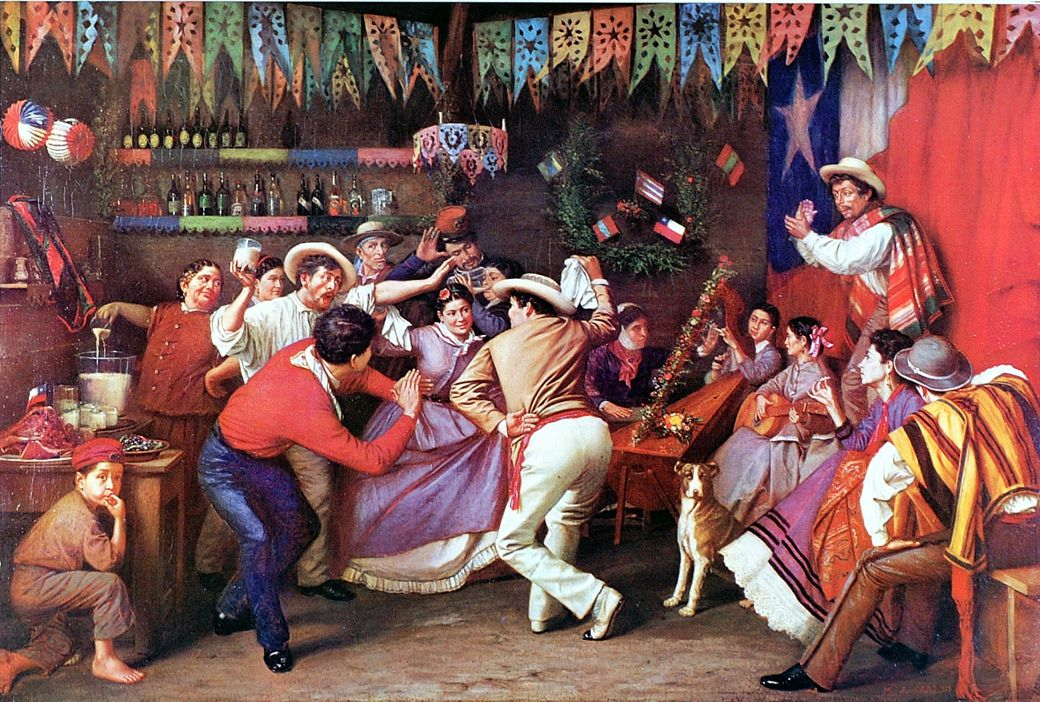
"La zamacueca" (Manuel Antonio Caro, 1873).

The Zamacueca is an ancient colonial dance and music that originated in the Viceroyalty of Peru, taking its roots from Spanish, and Andean rhythms. It is known as a celebratory dance of independence as South America was liberating itself from Spanish rule. It is one of the earliest popular dances of coastal Peru and a direct predecessor of the marinera.

== History ==
The word Zamacueca comes from the 16th-century Spanish dance Zamba Antigua combined with kwa-kwa, which in the African Kikongo language means cajón. This fusion, called Zamba Kwa-kwa (“Zamba of the drum”) later evolved into Zamacueca. The origin of zamacueca, also known as canto de jarana or marinera limeña, comes from the mestizaje music that occurred between the Romani people and the Mulatto people that inhabited Lima during the Viceroyalty of Peru. Founded in 1542, the Viceroyalty of Peru served as a major administrative division of the Spanish Empire. It encompassed modern-day Peru and much of Spain's South American territories with political authority centered in the capital city of Lima. Zamacueca dates back to the 16th and 17th centuries when this mixed musical form began to stand out in the Rímac and Barrios Altos neighborhoods of Callao as well as in bars located among Lima's bridges, alleyways, and balconies. The dance primarily emerged among enslaved people as a rhythmic and seductive courtship dance.

== Characteristics ==
The rhythm was played by the lute (later evolving into the guitar) or a harp where the rhythm was lightly drummed before the use of the cajón peruano. The cajon is a vibrant instrument known as the "heartbeat of Peruvian percussion" especially in genres like festejo, lando, and zamacueca and was first referenced to be used in the Amancaes festival in 1832.

A distinctive feature of the Zamacueca is that both dancers hold a white handkerchief in their right hand, waving it energetically above their heads while performing pelvic movements influenced by African culture. The most skilled performers of this dance gather at the famous Fiesta de Amancaes which is a festival composed of dance, traditional dishes, Peruvian Paso horses, and criolla music. Criolla music is a vibrant Peruvian genre blending Spanish, African, and Andean influences and often involve the cajon as the main instrument.

For costumes, women wear a long shirt called an anaco over a wide skirt fitted at the waist. It is complemented by the ornate filigree earrings known as "dormilonas". Men wear a fine straw hat, a striped white shirt, a northern sash, and white or black dress pants.

== Peruvian influence ==
Peruvian historian Rómulo Cúneo Vidal states that the zamacueca was a dance of rest, whose name came from the Quechua word zawani, meaning "dance of the day of rest". He referred to this dance as one of rest because it referred to the slaves and peasants' rest after a week of heavy labor during the Viceroyalty of Peru. Quechua is Peru's most spoken indigenous language and is the ancestral language of the Incan empire. It serves as a vital part of Andean history and heavily influenced the emergence of cultural fusion in Peru. The Peruvian zamacueca continued spreading throughout South America in the 1820s and during the 19th century, the style became popular in Chile where it was adopted and adapted into cueca.

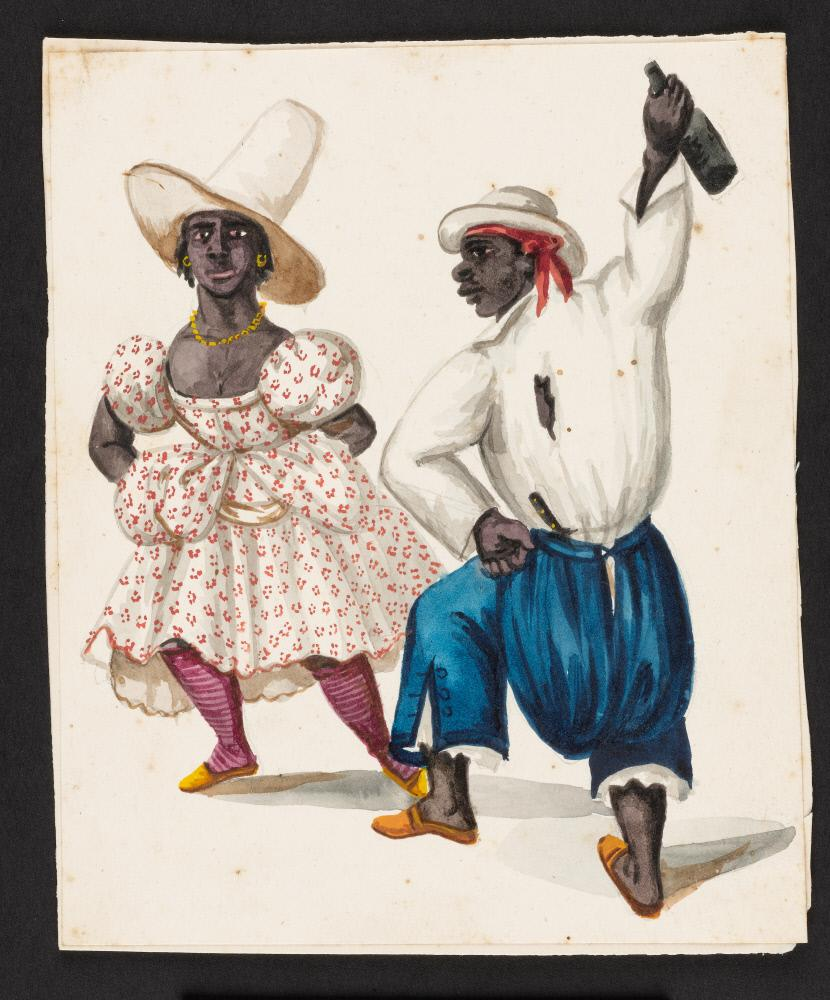
Zamacueca, dance that was banned in Peru because of its daring moves and its connection to Marinera.

== Hispanist influence ==
Zamacueca was said to be inspired by colonial ballroom dances such as the minuet, rigadoon, and quadrille which were danced by household servants and later spread to the general public. Melodies using instruments like the guitar and harp are considered Hispanic contributions to this popular dance. Additionally, the influence of the Spanish jota which is a lively folk dance characterized by quick, bouncing steps, was critical in the creation of the Zamacueca genre.

European rhythms like the fandango and the cashuas played an important role in shaping the zamacueca by introducing musical patterns and partner-dance traditions that were later adapted in Latin America. As these European styles spread during the colonial period, they blended with Indigenous and African influences, contributing to the creation of regional dances like the Chilean sajuriana, Venezuelan zambo, Río de la Plata's cielito gaucho, Ecuadorian amorfino, Granadian bambuco, and Peru's toro mata. Within this cultural exchange, the zamacueca developed as imported rhythms were blended into new Latin American expressions, establishing it as a foundational dance that later influenced other genres like the marinera.

== African influence ==
Aside from Hispanic influence, zamacueca also has African origins since people of mixed African descent were its principal dancers. People of mixed African descent, specifically a mix of African and Indigenous race, were known as Zambos. Fernando Romero Pintado, a well-known artist who depicts local traditions, states that the colonial dance known as the Zamba, performed by bozales (enslaved Africans newly brought to the Americas), is the mother of the zamacueca and the grandmother of the marinera. Likewise, researcher José Durand supports the idea that the zamacueca is the direct predecessor of the marinera.

== Cultural impact ==
The zamacueca has had a lasting cultural impact across Latin America and has influenced several national dances. One of its most notable adaptations is the cueca, which emerged in Chile after the dance spread beyond Peru and evolved to reflect local traditions and musical styles. Similarly, the zamacueca later influenced the development of the marinera, which is one of Peru's most well-known dances.

== See also ==
- Dances of Peru
- Latin American music
- Música criolla
- Music of Peru
- Cueca
