= Tondero =

Peruvian dance and guitar rhythm

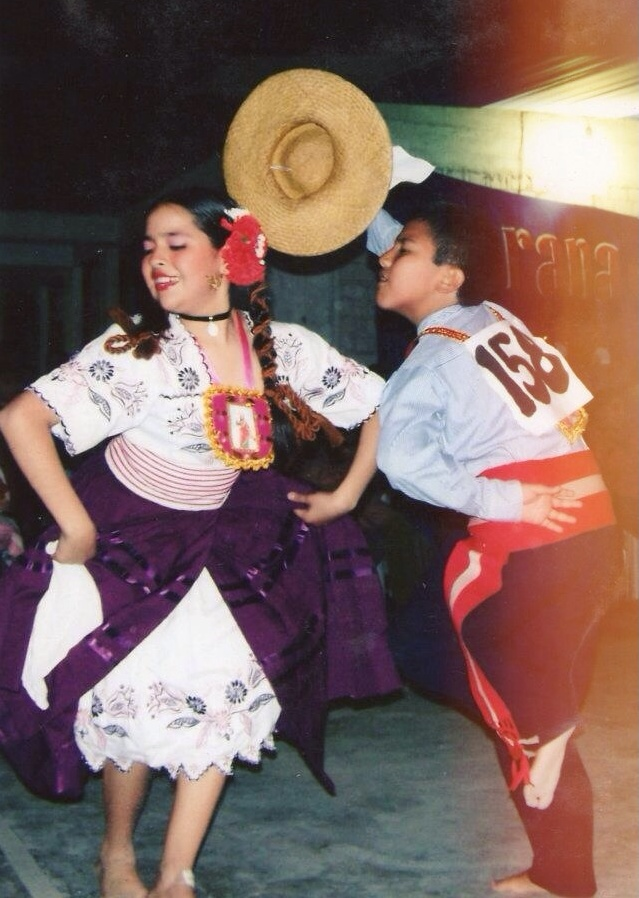
Tondero

Tondero is a dance and guitar rhythm from Peru that developed in the country's northern coastal region (Piura–Lambayeque).

== Geographical origin of tondero and cumananas ==
The Tondero is a Peruvian dance and rhythm born in the north coast adjacent to the eastern valleys of the Sierra or "yungas" of Piura, Sechura and Lambayeque. The oldest version is from the Morropón Province, approximately the center of Piura's region, below the highlands and inland from the coast.

== Description and composition of the tondero ==
The classical version consists of a principal singer, a small chorus, two Criollo style guitar players (one picking up the tundete or tondero bass line); the "Peruvian cajon" (now used in Latin American commercial rhythms), modern flamenco and evolutionary jazz, and/or Peruvian spoon players. It may be accompanied by palms or an Afro-Peruvian instrument made of dried and flattened pumpkins called checo.

It is also played by trumpet and drum bands.

=== Composition ===
It is composed of three parts: 1) glosa 2) dulce and 3) fuga.

1. The glosa is the entrance and lyrical informative part of a tondero. It is characterized by a tragic melodic ballad type of singing called triste or cumanana (picaresque way) whereby the principal voice is heard over the base line initial rhythm. The rhythm is accelerated as the introduction ends; the fast paced "repique" done by the cajons, spoons and hand claps is also called the "Golpe de Tierra".
2. The sweet, or dulce, is the intermedial and reaffirmation of the head singer many times sung right off a rhythm spin and sung by a chorus that cuts between the head singer.
3. The runaway, or fuga, is the ending part. It is very fast paced and sung very passionately.

== Ethnic origin of tondero ==
In its choreography and its music, the tondero is very similar to the marinera, Perú's national dance, and the marinera norteña, the version of the marinera popular in the northern part of Perú—roughly the area around Trujillo and Piura. All of these dances ultimately stem from what had been cultivated in Perú by Spanish horsemen of Romani origin, then modified by African slaves. The terminology of "Tondero" derives from the terms Volandero, and Volero (to fly by, describes the gypsy errant and caravanistic life) yet it eventually evolved into a "T", as to describe the tundete sound and base rhythm typical to it: "Bum Bum Bum". This base rhythm derives from trumpeting Csárdás yet carefully scales on guitar and the dance handfigures and movements are primitive bulerías. The cock fight so popular among Gypsies worldwide is where the dance gets its choreography and inspiration.

However, as the years went on, the significance of African influence added to its Romani origin and so did the mingling of these with the native Amerindians.

Unlike the Zamacueca, which directly derives from Zambrainas and Hispano-African influences without Andean addings, the Tondero maintains a stronger Romani origin in its tragic lyrics with visible addings of African and America, Indian influence as time went by.

== Tondero themes ==
The dance expresses three themes, all inspired from the same emotion: the errant life of birds, cockfighting very common among Peruvians (Peruvian roosters are the largest and most aggressive) and lastly, the falling in love; between birds or between the macho stallion that battles to get the acceptance of the female, she flirts and doesn't let him conquer her until the end.

The prototype image of tondero and cumanana singers is the solitary mestizo or creole (northern Peruvian) farmers who stop and sing about their tragic hard life, their errant ways. Themes are usually tragic and somewhat picaresque, where one makes fun of one's tragedy. Typical topics are the loss of cattle, crops (due usually to El Niño phenomena) or the lament due to unrequited love from his "china" (dear woman).

The use of the handkerchief, as a symbolic element that relates to the flying of errant birds, has a possible Romani inheritance that belongs to the weddings and is also seen in coastal dances like Zamacueca Limeña, Resbalosa, Canto de Jarana or Marinera Norteña. All of the dances seem to have guitarra and cajón instruments as their principal instruments.

Figures of course represent cockfights and the stumps, body-waist movements and hand movements are done in gypsy musical style where flirting is done by the women, and the stud acts, and picaresque attitude called machismo, is done by the man.

== Cultures that surround tondero and cumananas ==
Tondero is played by all coastal regions of the North; so there are styles from La Libertad, Lambayeque, Piura (the official region and origin of Tondero) and even Tumbes.

The "chinganas" (traditional Creole music bars) traditionally display white flags as an invitation for newcomers or solitary bohemian northmen "Piajenos" (the term used by northern people for typical farmers who ride donkeys and mules) to come refresh themselves from the northern heat and have a "Chicha de Jora" drink. They also provide a setting for musical performances, including tondero songs and rhythms, associated particularly with northern Lambayeque and southern Piura.

=== The "Cumanánas" and "Tristes" ===
The cumananas and "Tristes" are somewhat like the tragic initial Zards or the Cante Jondo of Andalucia but in a mestizo flavour. After a few drinks of Pisco, Algarrobina or Chicha en poto come the "Cumanánas"; whom are coplas brought in "contra punto" style. They are sung in satiric and picaresque style but rooted always in a sad theme. The cumananas all surround the Tondero. Right before a tondero it is common to play cumanana and tristes. You can hear the resemblance to the yaraví (Andean song) mestizo in the guitar, gypsy Romani ballads of eastern Europe or Spain in the form of song and then the explosive finish line or "tundete" of guitar: the rhythm of Tondero itself.

== Etymology ==
The most probable is that the term tondero derives from the term volero (flyer, birds that fly) or bolero and after years of changes to Tondero (with a t) as faster version based on Zards and Flamenco. The musical composition of guitarra has a resemblance to the order of those trumpet gypsy bands found in Romania or Hungary whom after tragic intro, flow as nomadic tunes.

So we have a caravan-like feeling, where rhythms of cajón resemble as if they were mules, donkeys or even horses from a caravan. The thumping noise is accompanied by the "Tundete of the guitarr" that sounds like Ton-Ton-Tun. That is why it probably changed into Tondero instead of Volero (Bolero); there is also a gypsy rhythm called Volandero.

The music resembles primitive "bulerías", "tangos" or zards yet played to the creative Peruvian cockfights, in the movements.

== Famous tonderos ==
1. EL BORRACHITO: Tondero from Salomón Díaz
2. HA DE LLEGAR MI DUENA: Tondero from Chabuca Granda
3. SAN MIGUEL DE PIURA: honoring of the first Spanish city in South America (Piura)
4. ROSA VICTORIA: a famous tondero dance from Canchaque-Morropon
5. LA PERLA DEL CHIRA: sung in honor of river and valley of Chira in Sullana
6. SAN MIGUEL DE MORROPON: the City of Tondero farmers
7. EL FORASTERO: in relation to their errant lives
8. COPLAS DE AMOR Y TONDERO: cumanana & tondero from Lambayeque
9. LA GRIPE LLEGO A CHEPEN: flu came to Chepen City
10. MALABRIGO: in honor of La Libertad region; bad-luck port
11. EN CHICLAYO NACIO DIOS: in honor of Chiclayo (hoy Trujillano)
