= Marinera =

National dance and music genre of Perú

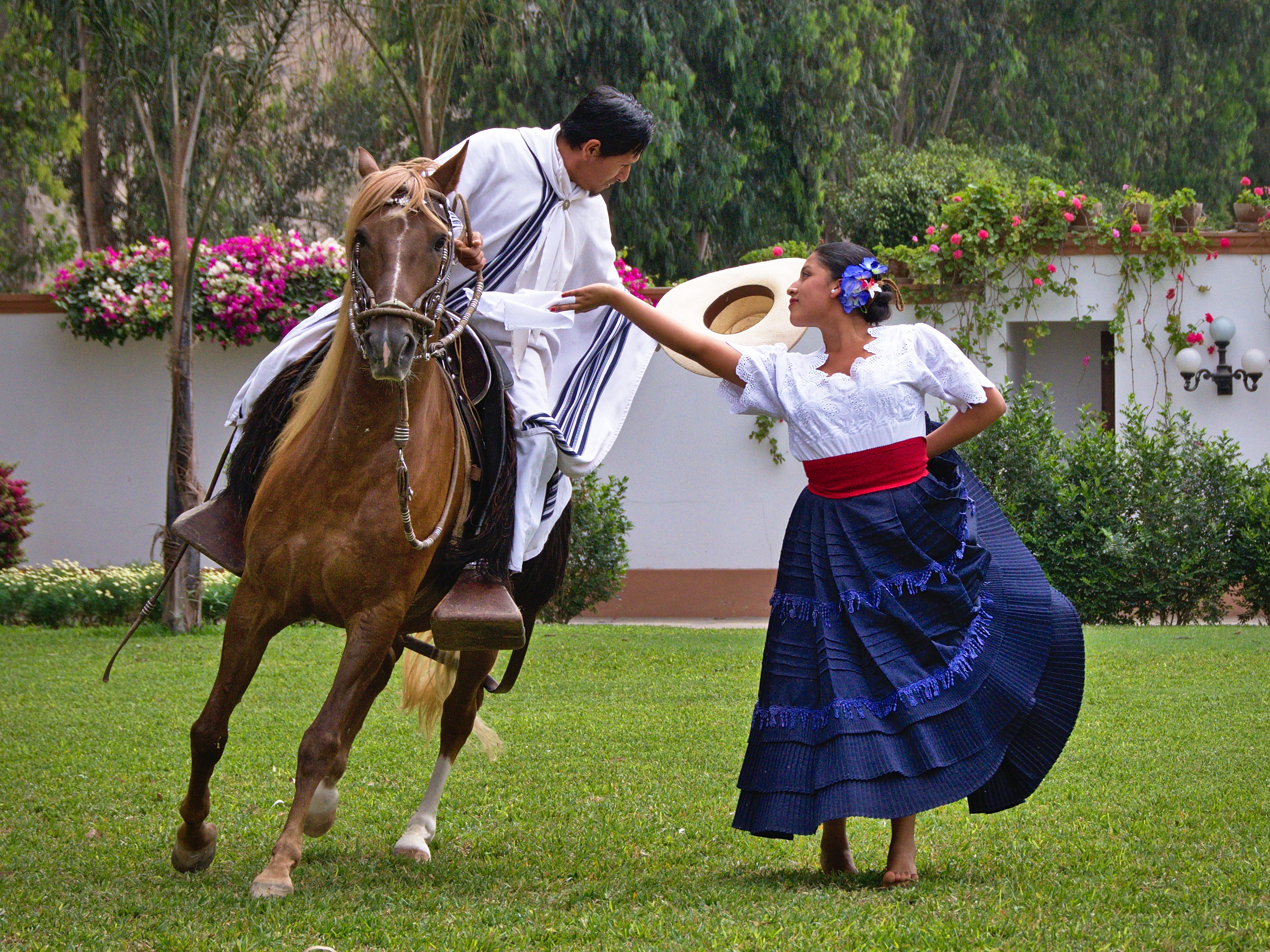
- A couple dances the Peruvian marinera
- Stylistic origins: Andean; candombe; milonga; tango flamenco; Música criolla; polka; waltz; payada
- Cultural origins: Peru, 1879–1894
- Derivative forms: Marinera norteña; Marinera limeña; Caballo de paso

Fusion genres
- Criolla; Cumbia

Other topics
- Peruvian music

Cultural Heritage of Peru
- Official name: Formas coreográficas y musicales de La Marinera
- Type: Intangible
- Criteria: Music and dances
- Designated: 30 January 1986; 40 years ago
- Legal basis: R.S. Nº 022-86-ED

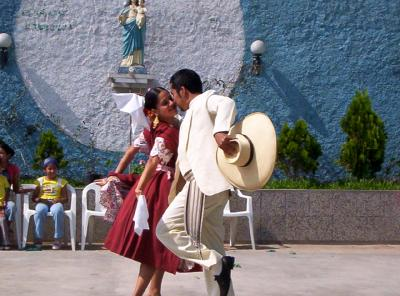
Marinera Norteña

Marinera is a partner dance that originated along the coastal regions of Peru, using handkerchiefs as props. The dance is a re-enactment of an ancient Mochic dance, modernised with a mix of Spanish contradanza and Andean zamacueca, and is a stylized reenactment of a courtship, showing a blend of the different cultures of Peru. The dance has gained recognition throughout South America and is known as the most prominent traditional dance of Peru. The city of Trujillo has been recognized as the national birthplace of the marinera since 1986. The Marinera Festival, a cultural event dedicated to marinera held in Trujillo, although as of 2023 the festival has been held in the city of Lima. These annual competitions of the dance have taken place since 1960. In 2012, the Congress of Peru observed nationally October 7 as a commemorative day for the marinera.

The dance is traditionally accompanied by several instruments: cajón, clarinets, guitars, drums, and bugles.

== History ==
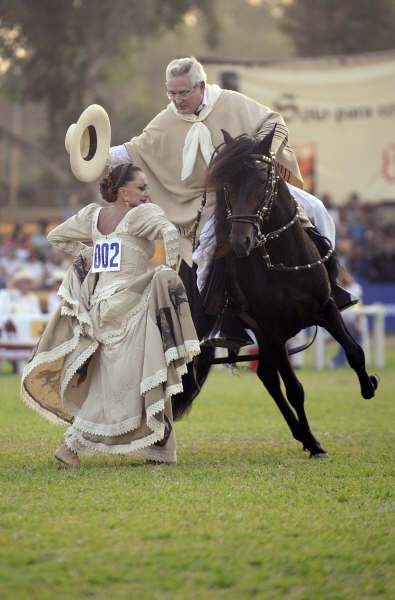
Peruvian Paso horse dancing marinera

The origins of the dance can be traced to Spanish, Moorish, Andean, and Romani people rhythmic influences. Although the dance had informally been around in Peru since the colonial era, it was formally recognized as "Marinera" in honor of the Navy of Peru, or the Marina de Guerra del Peru in 1879 during the War of the Pacific.

According to the Peruvian historian Rómulo Cúneo y Vidal, the Zamacueca was itself a dance of rest during the era of the Inca Empire. Thus, coming from such a far native Peruvian background, the dance is itself simply a derivation of an ancient Peruvian dance. Ancient pottery dating from the Pre-Columbian era called huacos depicted people resting in Zamacueca positions.

The first Marinera to be written in musical notation was La Concheperla composed by Abelardo Gamarra Rondó and José Alvarado, by Rosa Mercedes Ayarza de Morales in 1894...

== Creation theories ==
=== Peruvian proposal ===
Peru claims that the dance is exclusively Peruvian.

According to Peruvian historian Rómulo Cúneo y Vidal, the zamacueca was itself a dance of rest during the times of the Inca Empire and pre-Inca cultures, supporting the proposal that Marinera is native to Peru as a derivation of traditional dance, as depicted in some ancient huacos of people resting in Zamacueca positions.

=== Hispanic proposal ===
Ballroom dances of Europe's Viceroyalty are also a proposed origin for many Latin American dances, including the Marinera. The Hispanic proposal also suggests that European ballroom dances such as "Fandango" and "Cashuas" led to the creation of the Chilean Sajuriana, the Venezuelan Zambo, the Argentine Cielo Gaucho, the Mexican Tas-be, the Colombian Bambuco, the Ecuadorian Amor Fino, and the Peruvian Toro Mata.

== Varieties ==
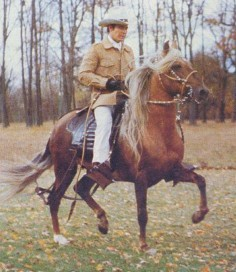
Peruvian Paso.

Different schools and dancing styles of the Marinera exist, based on location. There are Marinera dance academies all over Peru, and competitions are frequently held. The most important competition is the National Competition of the Marinera (Concurso Nacional de Marinera) held during the National Festival of the Marinera (Festival Nacional de Marinera), held in Trujillo, every January.

The three main variations are the Marinera Limeña, the Marinera Norteña, and the Marinera Serrana. Sometimes the Marinera is danced with her partner mounted on a Peruvian Paso (the horse dancing, and the chálan directing it).

=== Marinera Limeña ===
This Marinera is elegant and a little slow-paced in comparison to other variations. The dance can be interpreted in low or high tones. The Marinera of contrapunto or "canto de jarana" usually consists of three Marineras, Resbalosa (Slippery), and a succession of "fugas" (Escapes).

Nowadays, the Marinera Limeña seems to be becoming overshadowed by the Marinera Norteña, because of its popular qualities. Nevertheless, the dance still has a small number of fans that dance it during October fests or during the anniversary of Lima.

=== Marinera Norteña ===
It acquired characteristics of the Marinera Limeña, and soon enough it became a new variation of the dance. The dance itself tends to be quick-paced and though not as "elegant" as the Limeña, it can also be very stylish. Even though the dance originated in the Northern coasts of the country, it has become quite popular throughout Peru.

It is thanks to that popularity that the Marinera is considered the National Dance of Peru, along with the Peruvian Waltz.

The Marinera Norteña is characterized by male dancers wearing shoes while female dancers perform barefoot. Extended practice causes female dancers' feet to adapt, enabling them to execute steps on coarse or hot outdoor pavement

The dancer must go to the dance floor wearing their best clothes but with bare feet, in the same way they did the rural northern girls of the nineteenth century. Being forced to dance barefoot on any surface without showing any discomfort, professional dancers should practice enough to develop thick calluses on the soles of their feet."

"The Marinera Norteña allows men to wear shoes, but women must dance barefoot, soon developing thick calluses on their feet, of which they are proud to show off."

"It was in Trujillo that female dancers started the whole tradition of going barefoot—some even pride themselves on being able to put out cigarettes on their callused soles."

Very often the Marinera Norteña presentations on open air are purposely scheduled at noon, when the pavement is hotter, because this motivates and encourages the barefoot female dancers to dance better and to conquer the Chalán and also because the public is astonished to see how the girls smile and enjoy as they burn the soles of their feet on the scorching hot ground.

Besides high skills and constant rehearsals, marinera also demands physical effort from the dancers, who must exercise and have a proper diet. In order to strengthen the soles of their feet it is known that many marinera dancer women train by walking barefoot in the street, going to different places as a part of their regular routine and in their spare time, becoming what's known as "barefooters". More advanced female dancers are even able to walk barefoot on broken glass and to put cigarettes out on the tough soles of their feet, in order to make them stronger. Men, on the other hand, have intense practice on "zapateo" and the different steps of the dance until they master them. A marinera norteña dancer may leave aside social life, family reunions and resting hours in order to dedicate time to his/hers passion.

It's mandatory that the women dance barefoot. It is unacceptable for them to wear sandals, canvas shoes, ballet slippers or any kind of footwear outside of practice.

For the men it is typical to wear "chalan" clothing, with cotton poncho, or a suit and a wide straw hat. In some places they wear a white drill suit. Men wear black, glossy shoes.

=== Marinera Serrana ===
This Marinera is typical from the highland and mountain regions of Peru. It usually has a minor tone and is characterized by a slower movement. This marinera is also repeated twice, and then is followed by a "fuga de huayno". The second part is more sentimental than the first one.

== See also ==
- Peruvian Paso
- Peruvian music
