= Lucha Reyes (Peruvian singer) =

Peruvian musical artist (1936–1973)

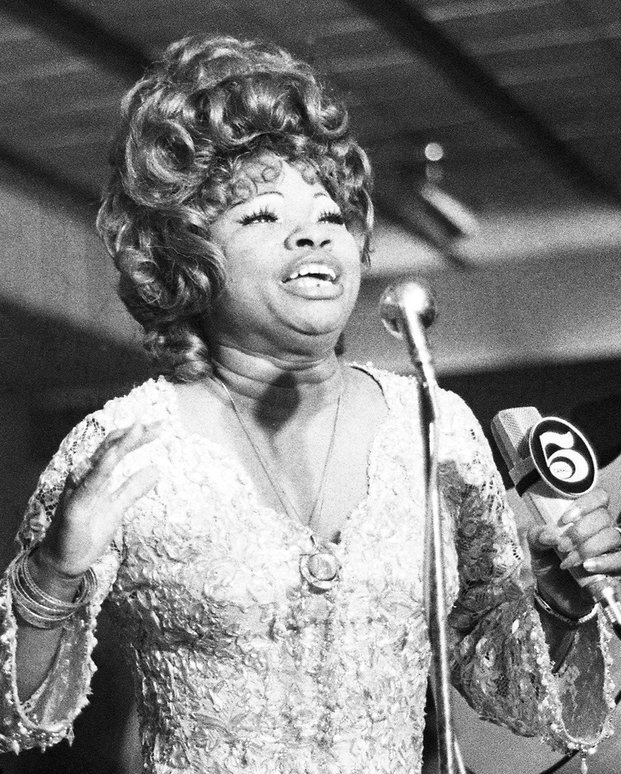
- Lucha Reyes in 1972
- Born: Lucila Justina Sarcines Reyes; July 19, 1936; Rímac, Lima, Peru
- Died: October 31, 1973 (aged 37); Lima, Peru
- Burial place: El Ángel Cemetery
- Other names: La Morena de Oro del Perú (The Golden Dark-Skinned Woman of Peru); La Reina de la Popularidad (The Queen of Popularity)
- Occupations: Musician; Singer-songwriter
- Musical career
- Origin: Lima
- Genres: Música criolla; Peruvian waltz
- Instrument: Vocals
- Years active: 1958–1973
- Label: RCA Records

Lucila Justina Sarcines Reyes (July 19, 1936 – October 31, 1973), was a Peruvian performer and one of the most respected singers of her country, one of Peru's most famous African-Peruvian personalities as well as a symbol of Peruvian nationalism both in Peru and to expatriates. She was also known by the pseudonyms "La Morena de Oro del Perú", given to her by Augusto Ferrando, and "La Reina de la Popularidad". She is well known for her voice and her music has gone through history as some of the best in the history of Peruvian music.

== History ==
Born to a poor family in the capital, Lima, Reyes was one of sixteen siblings. Her father, Tobías Sarcines, died after she turned six months old. Reyes spent much of her childhood living away from her immediate family. She sold newspapers and lottery tickets to survive. Her house burned down, and she went on to live at a Catholic church.

As a child, Reyes met Pitito Pérez, a famous Peruvian singer of the era. Pérez liked her voice and invited her to join him in a duo. The duo was named Lucha y Juan. The duo gave Reyes the opportunity to be heard on national radio stations. Lucha Reyes debuted in a show named El Sentir de los Barrios (or "The way the Neighborhoods Feel") singing the cultural standard "Abandonada" by Sixto Carrera, a song with lyrics that resembled her own experiences on the streets. She eventually joined the controversial music group Peña Ferrando of Augusto Ferrando.

Lucha Reyes was briefly married to a policeman.

== Art ==
Reyes acted sporadically in theater plays around Lima and would later go on to act in a movie named Una Carta al Cielo ("A Letter to Heaven") by Salvador Oda, about a boy whose dead mother (voiced-over by Reyes) would speak to him. Lucha performed in various acts, living on art in a bohemian style, and produced music favored by the military nationalist government, who encouraged the diffusion of the Peruvian cultural expressions through mass media.

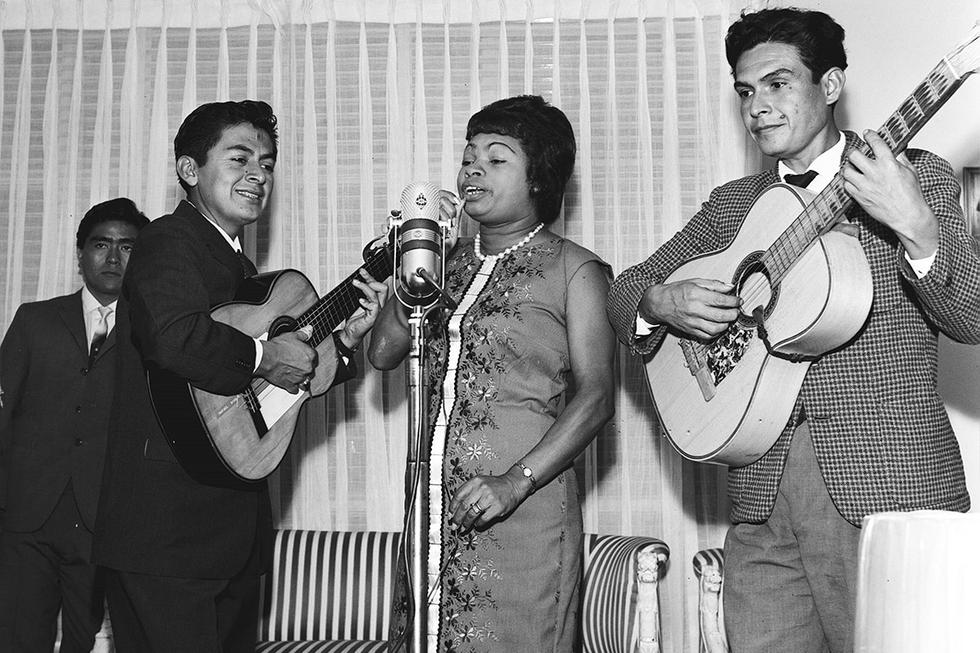
Presentation of Lucha Reyes at the Peña Ferrando, on April 11, 1966.

In 1970, helped by Nilo Marchand, manager of the record label FTA (Fabricantes Técnicos Asociados), subsidiary company of RCA, Reyes recorded her greatest success, "Regresa" ("Come Back") by Augusto Polo Campos, a number-one international hit. On the success of "Regresa", Reyes recorded her first LP and, soon after, began her only international tour.

== Last days ==
She was diagnosed with tuberculosis and diabetes. The diabetes left her blind. She had cardiac complications and alcoholism.

Lucha Reyes asked composer Pedro Pacheco to write "Mi Última Canción" ("My Last Song"). On October 30, 1973, one day before her death, she sang "My Last Song" at a well-known local radio broadcasting station. On the following day, October 31, 1973, Lucha Reyes, "La Morena de Oro del Perú" (Peru's Golden Black Woman) died. She is buried in El Ángel Cemetery in Lima.

== Legacy ==
Lucha Reyes and the ensemble Los Morochucos made a name for black performers among the leading interpreters of the vals criollo and marinera genres. The vals criollo derives from the Viennese waltz. The music is not originally African-Peruvian, but was converted by phrasing lyrics and playing the vals criollo with slightly off-beat accents. The addition of the cajón to the traditional instrumentation of two guitars served to give the vals an African -Peruvian dimension. Marinera songs honor the sailors who fought in the war with Chile and are played with two guitars, a cajón, and accompanied by hand clapping.

Songs such as "¿Qué Importa?" of Juan Mosto ("What Does It Matter?"), with lyrics like " yet another failure is but a drop of water in the ocean for me " were made famous by Lucha Reyes. Her songs were rich with Peruvian Nationalism and criollo pride. October 31, the anniversary of her death, coincides with the annual celebration of the "Día de la Canción Criolla" (Day of the Creole Song) in Peru.

== Discography ==
- La Morena De Oro Del Peru (1970)
- Una Carta al Cielo (1971)
- Siempre Criolla (1972)
- Mi Ultima Cancion (1973)
- ¡Regresa!.... (1974)
- Lucha por Siempre....Lucha (1974)
- El Show de Lucha Reyes (1975)
- Cuatro Estrellas Criollas
- Jamás impedirás
- Un rosal divino
- Yo tengo una pena

=== Compilations ===
- Criollos Inolvidables
- Criollos Inolvidables Vol.2
- Criollos Inolvidables Vol.3
- Regresa: Lucha Reyes, La Morena de Oro del Perú (Music & More, 2010)
