= Landó (music) =

Peruvian music genre

Landó is an Afro-Peruvian form of music in the musica criolla genre.

== Influences ==
There are theories of the origin of this genre. According to the Peruvian reciter and ethnomusicologist Nicomedes Santa Cruz (1925-1992), the word "landó" derives from ondú, an African dance. It is also suggested that the landó comes from the Brazilian dance lundu. Likewise, the term "landó" is hardly found in the literature of the time of the Viceroyalty of Peru, although there is some mention of the "zamba landa". No reliable historical sources have yet been found on which an accurate description of the development of the landau in Peru can be elaborated; the only available source is the scant information provided by twentieth-century informants who witnessed the execution and the text and music of the few landós that have survived.

== Today ==
It is only in the 1960s that a song called "Samba Malató", compiled in Lima by Nicomedes Santa Cruz, and recorded by his Conjunto "Cumanana" became popular. Since then, dance groups have recreated a choreography for this dance, as the original was lost.

After this success, other landós emerged such as "A saca camote con el pie" and "Taita Guaranguito", collected in the areas of Cañete and Chincha. Over the years, various composers popularized various landós.

== Rhythmic structure ==
The basic rhythm of Landó is a two-bar figure, played on the cajón (B = bass, F = flam, . = rest):

B . F . B B | . F B . F B 

...or, alternatively:

B . F . B B | . F . F . B 

This pattern is closely related to a bell pattern found in many African-based rhythms (L = low pitch, H = high pitch):

L . H . H H | . H . H . H 

However, another pattern for the hand bell is often favoured:

H H H . H H | H . H H H .
