= Los Troveros Criollos =

Peruvian musical group

Los Troveros Criollos (English: The Creole Searchers) is a Peruvian musical group that is recognized for its contribution to música criolla. Between 1952 and 1961, they recorded a wide range of songs, which became standards within the genre.

== History ==
Los Troveros Criollos was founded as a dúo in 1952 by lead guitarist and vocalist Luis Garland and Jorge Pérez, main vocalist and rhythm guitar. Their style was remarkable and somehow funny, using in their songs typical street expressions, known as "replana". Their composer Mario Cavagnaro created exclusively these songs for them. Their biggest hits were "Yo la quería Patita", "Cantame ese vals Patita"" and "Afane otro estofado".

Garland and Pérez separated in 1955, because of musical reasons. Luis Garland, looking for improvements and development in his music found two other musicians, to fulfill his aspirations. Jorge Pérez remained loyal to his original style and continued singing similar songs until the end of his career.

The trío Los Troveros Criollos consisted of Humberto Pejovés (lead singer), Luis Garland (vocals and lead guitar) and José Ladd (vocals and rhythm guitar). Their style was wide and included all typical arts of musica criolla; i.e. valses, marineras limenas, marineras nortenas, tonderos, etc. Among the characteristics of this group were their ability to create romantic three voice harmonies as well as energic and furious interpretations of the old guard (guardia vieja) waltzes and marineras.

Los Troveros Criollos' biggest hits were "Luis Pardo", "Romance en la Parada" (a love story in the marketplace), "Cuando esté bajo una Loza" (When I´m buried) and "Rosa Te". They separated in 1961, because of personal reasons. All of them returned to practice their own professions in finances and law.

For a short period another trío was built, integrated by again Luis Garland, José Ladd and Carlos García, new lead vocal. During this period their major hits were "El rosario de mi madre", "Gracia", and "Noche de Amargura". They finally separated in 1962.

== Discography ==
The first generation of Los Troveros Criollos (Garland & Pérez), recorded many songs between 1952 and 1955. The most popular were: "Afana otro Estofado", "Ay Raquel", "Cantame ese Vals Patita", "Carretas aquí es el Tono", "El Parisien", "Parlamanias" and "Yo la quería Patita".

The second generation of Los Troveros Criollos (Pejovés, Garland & Ladd) also recorded a wide number of songs between 1956 and 1960. The most popular were: "Corto Circuito", "Cuando esté bajo una Loza", "Luis Pardo", "Puedes irte", "Romance en La Parada", "Rosa Té" and "Zamba Zambita".

The third generation of Los Troveros Criollos (García, Garland & Ladd) recorded their first and only own LP and a contribution to another one called The Best of Chabuca Granda. Their major hits were "El Rosario de mi Madre", "Gracia" and "Noche de Amargura".

Period	Song	Author
1952–1955	Ay Raquel	A.Polo Campos
1952–1955	Cabecita loca	F. Quiroz
1952–1955	Cantame ese Vals Patita	M. Cavagnaro
1952–1955	Carretas aquí es el Tono	M. Cavagnaro
1952–1955	El Parisien	Derechos reservados
1952–1955	La Jarana de Colón	A. Polo Campos
1952–1955	Yo la quería Patita	M. Cavagnaro
1956–1960	Corto Circuito	M. Cavagnaro
1956–1960	Cuando esté bajo una Loza	M. Acosta Ojeda
1956–1960	Luis Pardo	Guardia vieja
1956–1960	Mi Perdición	Guardia vieja
1956–1960	Puedes irte	M. Acosta Ojeda
1956–1960	Romance en la Parada	A. Polo Campos
1956–1960	Rosa Té	M. Arroyo
1961–1962	Así te quiero yo	M. Acosta Ojeda
1961–1962	El Rosario de mi Madre	M. Cavagnaro
1961–1962	Gracia	I. Granda
1961–1962	Noche de Amargura	A. Polo Campos
