= Harawi (genre) =

Harawi is an ancient traditional genre of Andean music and also indigenous lyric poetry. Harawi was widespread in the Inca Empire and now is especially common in countries that were part of it, mainly: Peru, Ecuador, Bolivia. Typically, harawi is a moody, soulful slow and melodic song or tune played on the quena (flute). The words of harawi speak of love (often unrequited), plight of ordinary peasant, privations of orphans, etc. Melodies are mainly in minor pentatonic scale.

Harawi is frequently used at marriages and agricultural ceremonies. The genre is monophonic and has been traditionally sung by elderly women in a high nasal style.

== History ==
The first recorded harawi lyrics related to the Inca era. Some of the extant songs may also have the same age. Later, harawi became the basis for the mestizo genre yaravi.

== "Harawi language" ==
In Andean villages, there is still a tradition: a man, in love with a woman, expresses his feelings for her by playing one of many well-known "harawis" on the flute, not far from her house. She recognizes the melody and remembers the words of this song to understand the feelings men experience.
