= Música criolla =

Genre of Peruvian music

Criolla music
- Stylistic origins: European waltz; polka; Afro-Peruvian music
- Cultural origins: Central coast of Peru
- Typical instruments: Percussion, wind, string instruments

Subgenres
- Peruvian polka, Peruvian waltz, marinera, landó, festejo

Fusion genres
- Salsa-criolla, electronic-festejo, criolla rock

Regional scenes
- Afro-Peruvian music

Música criolla, Peruvian Creole music or canción criolla is a varied genre of Peruvian music that exhibits influences from European, African and Andean music. The genre's name reflects the coastal culture of Peru, and the local evolution of the term criollo, a word originally denoting high-status people of full Spanish ancestry, into a more socially inclusive element of the nation.

From the presence of waltzes of Viennese origin, mazurkas, with the influence of French and Italian music from Europe, Lima's popular culture was shaped through the transformation and decantation of genres, transforming the musical genres and imported aesthetic patterns in such a way that, even assuming the fashions corresponding to each era, some musical forms were developed and developed that reach the end of the 20th century and identify what is Peruvian. Each historical moment, from the colonial period until now, was shaped in different ways in the musical culture of Peru through the musical instruments used, the forms and contents of the songs, dances, etc.

Among the most representative genres of criollo music are the Peruvian waltz (vals criollo) and the Peruvian polka. It also extends as criollo music the Marinera, the Tondero, the Festejo, the Zamacueca, coplas de amor fino, landó, among others. Peru's national Día de la Canción Criolla takes place on October 31.

== Subgenres ==
=== Vals criollo ===
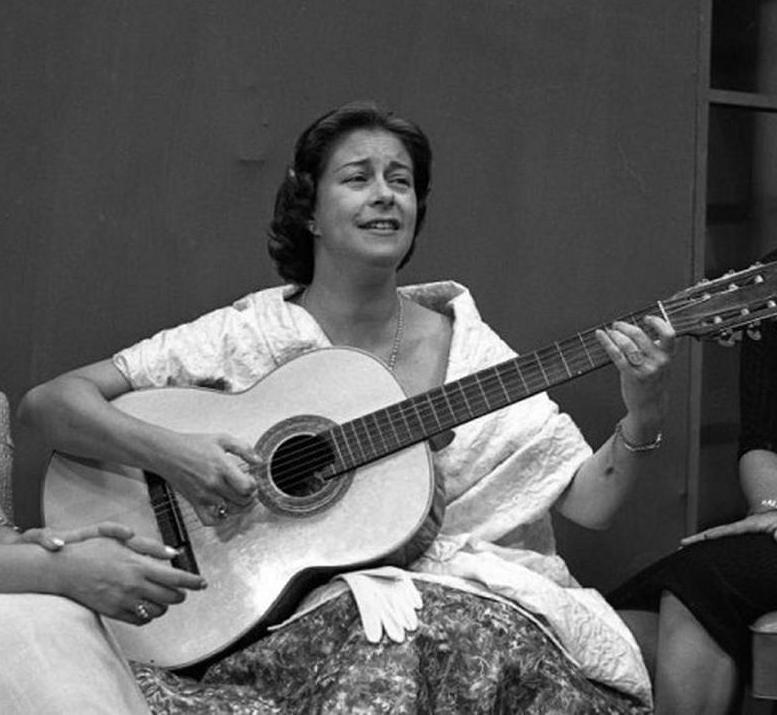
Chabuca Granda singing during a presentation on national television in 1960.

The vals criollo is a unique musical form characterized by 3/4 time, originating in the coast of Peru. The vals criollo is a variation of the European Waltz brought by Spaniards to Peru, played with Spanish instruments by criollos and mestizos of all races since the Peruvian Colonial Period. It was around the 1930s when city neighborhoods or barrios started developing their own styles. It was not heavily promoted by the media until the 50s when several Peruvian groups and singers started touring heavily. Other singers, songwriters and ethnomusicologists were compiling old interpretations and began recording songs that were never recorded before. This type of music includes elaborate Spanish guitar work accompanied in recent years by cajón and castanets with lyrics that talk about love, social dilemmas and nostalgia. This form is known outside of Peru as vals peruano (Peruvian waltz). Popular vals artists include singers like Arturo "Zambo" Cavero, Jesús Vásquez, groups like Los Morochucos, Los Troveros Criollos, Los Embajadores Criollos, Fiesta Criolla and composers like Felipe Pinglo Alva, Chabuca Granda and Augusto Polo Campos.

=== Polca criolla ===
The Peruvian polka or polka criolla is a musical genre and ballroom dance originated in Peru within the genre of Criollo (Spaniard) music. It has its origins in Peru in the 19th century, coming from Europe. Is similar to the vals in some respects, but is composed in 4/4 time and has a much faster rhythm. The style and lyrics are an expression of mischievous and joyous celebration of life. It is also called "polquita", a term of endearment. Like the vals, it is typical of the coast, using the same basic repertoire of instruments, interpreters, and songwriters. Some common examples are "La Pitita", "Callao", and "Tacna".

=== Marinera ===
Marinera is a graceful and romantic couple's dance that uses handkerchiefs as props. The dance is an elegant and stylized reenactment of a courtship, and it shows a blend of the different cultures of Peru. Different schools and dancing styles of the Marinera exist, based on location. There are Marinera dance academies all over Peru, and competitions are frequently held.

==== Marinera Limeña or Canto de Jarana ====
The coplas, music and dance of the Limenian Marinera comes from the Zamacueca, intensely danced in 19th century Peru. However, it is Abelardo Gamarra, "El Tunante", who proposes, after the war with Chile, to change the name of the Zamacueca to that of Marinera, honouring the fallen war heroes of the Peruvian Navy, since at the time the Zamacueca had the alternative name of Chilena. The Zamacueca gives rise to the Argentinian Zamba, the Cueca Cuyana and Cueca Norteña (Argentina), the Chilean Cueca, the Bolivian Cueca, the Mexican Chilena, and the Limenian Marinera (Peru). The Jarana singing was the accompaniment of choice for the Marinera Limeña, cultivated by musical groups in Lima until the middle of the 20th century, Jarana singing has declined since then.

A Limenian Marinera consists of five parts: three marineras, one resbalosa and one fuga. For this reason, it is said "Marinera de Jarana: of five, three." In this musical and choreographic form, the practitioners can compete in a song of counterpoint of variable time, according to the enthusiasm and the circumstances of the meeting.

Nowadays, the Marinera Limeña seems to be becoming overshadowed by the Marinera Norteña, because of the later popular qualities. Nevertheless, the dance still has a small number of fans that dance it during the festivals of the Purple Month (October) or during the anniversary of Lima.

==== Marinera Norteña ====
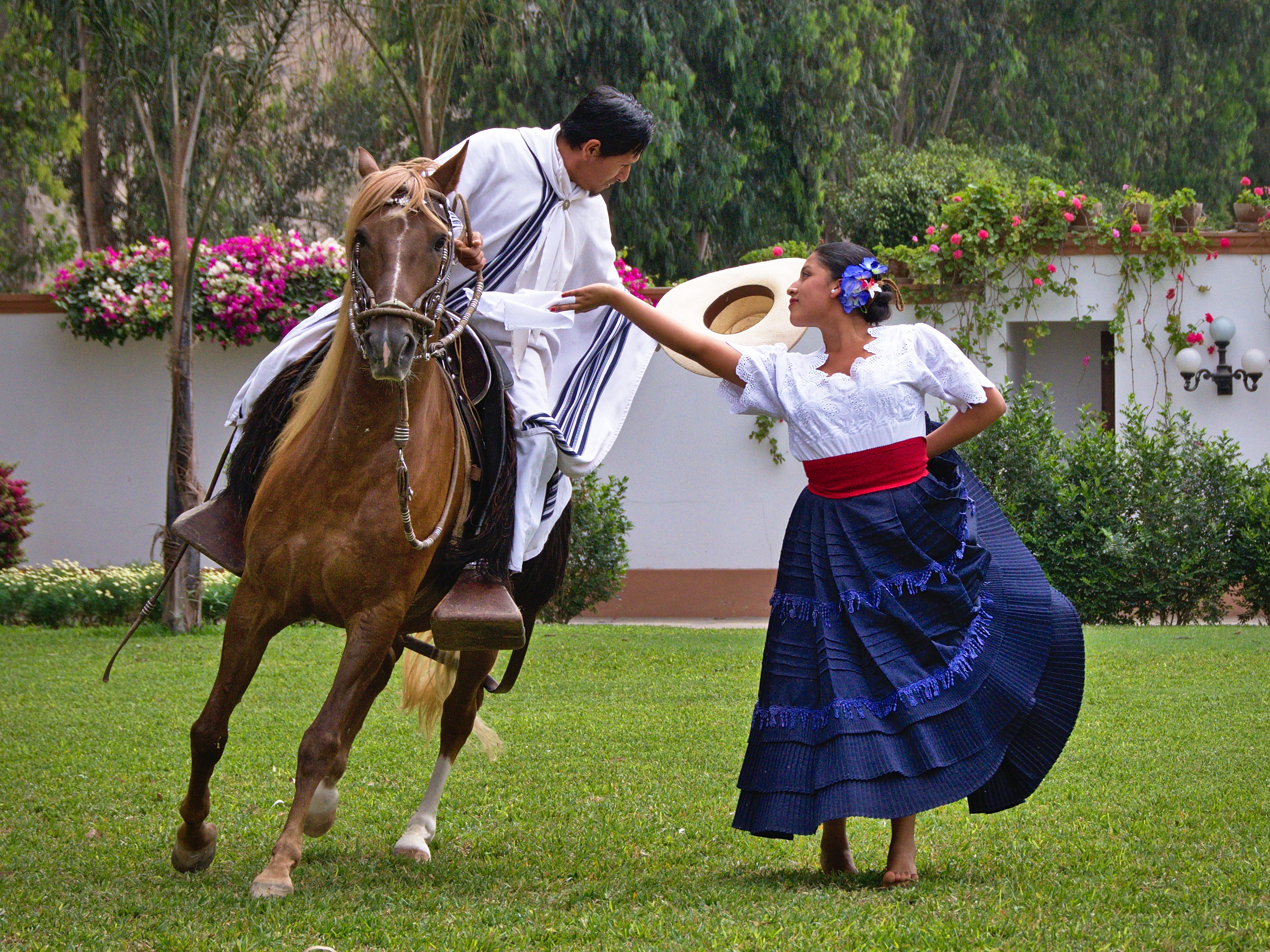
Marinera dance with Peruvian Paso horse

The Northern Marinera originates in the northern Peruvian coast and acquired characteristics of the Marinera Limeña, soon enough it became a new variation of the dance. The dance itself tends to be quick-paced and though not as "elegant" as the Limeña, it can also be very stylish. Even though the dance originated in the northern coast of the country, it has become quite popular throughout Peru. It is thanks to that popularity that the Marinera is considered the National Dance of Peru, along with the Peruvian Waltz.

In the Marinera Norteña, the man wears shoes, while the woman dances completely barefoot. In the most traditionalist households of Peru's northern coastal desert towns and villages, it is known that many marinera women dancers train by walking barefoot on the pavement, going to different destinations as a part of their regular schedule and in their spare time, becoming what's known as "barefooters", being able to dance barefoot on extremely hot pavement and coarse, very rough surfaces, as the soles of their feet become well seasoned and toughened up, something they are really proud of. "The dancer must go to the dance floor wearing their best clothes but with bare feet, in the same way they did the rural northern girls of the nineteenth century."

In this variety there's no "Marinera dress". Female dancers should wear the typical clothing of the towns where this marinera style is performed. It is mandatory though that women dance barefoot, it is unacceptable for them to wear any kind of footwear to perform this dance. For the men it is typical to wear "chalan" clothing, with cotton poncho and wide straw hat. In some places they wear a white drill suit. Men wear black, glossy shoes.

==== Marinera Serrana ====
The Marinera Serrana or Marinera Andina is typical of the highlands and mountainous regions of Peru, having a more indigenous "Andean" vibe than the rest of Marineras. It usually has a minor tone and is characterized by a slower movement. This marinera is repeated twice, and then is followed by a "fuga de huayno". The second part is more sentimental than the first one.

=== Tondero ===
Tondero, nowadays also called Marinera of the Alto Piura, or Marinera of the yunga piurana (Morropon). Its origins predate the Zamacueca, despite being labeled as a Marinera at the present time. It derives from gypsy and Spanish music in dance and song. The main characteristic that differentiates it from the typical Marinera is its repetitive guitar tundete related to gypsy band trumpet music. It has African influence in its chorus form and sometimes the use of checo, an instrument built using dry gourd to give "black rhythm". It has a later Andean influence as well, which is reflected in its melodic "squeaky" form of playing the guitar. Tondero carries the influence of the mestizaje criollo (Hispanic-Gypsy-Afro-descendants) and indigenous Andean. Cities like Morropón, Chulucanas, San Juan de Bigote, La Matanza, and Salitral were dotted with rice and soapweed plantations where many black slaves lived, and due to the proximity to the mountain range, Andean Indian migrants as well, the later brought the melancholic Yaraví (Harawi) from the Andean highlands, melting it with the Hispanic-African Cumanana of the coast, creating the famous northern term "triste con Fuga de Tondero" (sad with Fuga of Tondero), which is very popular in the yunga areas of Lambayeque (Chongoyapana).

=== Zamacueca ===
The Peruvian researcher Castro Nué has dealt with the origin of certain dances, and maintains that the Marinera has its origin in the Zamacueca or Mozamala. This dance of manners probably originates in the North Coast of Peru, La Libertad region. In its origin it derives from dances of European, Andean, and African origins, that were typically danced in the Peruvian coast. The northern version is more lively, moving and played on trumpets as well, although in Lima, the Zamacueca has more African influence and the guitar playing style is sweeter and more rhythmic, that is, contrasted with the northern version which is more "agitanada" and "mestiza". As in the Tondero piurano, the dance represents the chase of the rooster to the hen, the love of birds and the Pelea de Gallos, themes so popular within the central and northern coast of Peru. The woman dancer wears a nightgown called anaco that protrudes as a blouse over the wide skirt attached to the waist. The famous "Dormilonas", artistic earrings made of filigree, are also very colourful, the work of the town's goldsmiths. The male wears a fine straw hat, a striped or white shirt, a northern sash and white or black trousers.

=== Afroperuvian ===
Afro-Peruvian music was first created by African slaves in Peru during the Colonial Period and beyond. The rhythms include Festejo, Landó, Socabon, Pregon, Zamacueca, and Alcatraz. Many of those were played with a mixture of Spanish and Indian instruments and used the Spanish coplas as lyrics. They were practiced only in private black gatherings until the 1950s, when efforts of some scholars studying the Peruvian community, such as Nicomedes Santa Cruz, Victoria Santa Cruz and Jose Durand, compiled songs and dances after struggling with racism and poor recognition. Interpreters such as Lucila Campos, Caitro Soto, Susana Baca, Eva Ayllon, and the Peru Negro dance company, among others, have brought these genres to the world's attention. Landó is often compared to blues music because of its minor scale and its rhythmic origin. Musically the Landó is slower than the Festejo. Victoria Santa Cruz (who directed the National School of Folklore in Peru), worked to develop this genre around 40 or 50 years ago. It is related to South American dances of courtship because of its sensual movements and the soft tempo. Composed in 12/8 time, it has become a popular choice for Peruvian songwriters. It has its origins in the Angolan londu, and is also related to the Brazilian lundu.

Festejo (from Spanish 'fiesta') is a festive form of music. It can be seen as a celebration of Peru's independence and the emancipation of slaves, or as an attempt to reinvent diaspora African music without reference to slavery. Composers of all races have contributed to the development of festejo repertoire. Its origins are in a competitive circle dance performed by men playing cajónes. Nowadays, people of all ages and races participate in a witty dance accompanying the festejo.

== See also ==
- Andean music
- Latin American culture
- Latin American music
- Nueva ola
- Peruvian dances
- Peruvian cumbia
- Peruvian rock
