= Peruvian waltz =

Peruvian musical genre

Peruvian Creole Waltz
- Native name: Vals criollo, Vals peruano
- Stylistic origins: European Waltz; Classical music; Peruvian music; Music of Spain
- Cultural origins: Late XIX century – early XX Century, Peru
- Typical instruments: Classical Guitar; bass guitar (or double bass sometimes); cajón; accordion; vocals; piano

The vals criollo (English: Creole waltz), or Peruvian waltz (Spanish: vals peruano), is an adaptation of the European waltz brought to the Americas during colonial times by Spain. In the Viceroyalty of Peru, the waltz was gradually adapted to the likings of the Criollo people. In the 20th century, the genre became symbolic of the nation's culture as it gained widespread popularity in the country. It also became popular outside of Peru, particularly in Argentina, where local artists composed many notable Peruvian waltz compositions such as Amarraditos and Que nadie sepa mi sufrir.

== History ==
"La Guardia Vieja," translated as "the old guard," was a time period in Peru approximately from 1900 to 1920 in which as a result of the combination of European, Afro-Peruvian, and indigenous musical elements the vals criollo emerged among the public. The music is characterized by the use of triple metre, sometimes compound duple time, and the lyrics consist of verses in strophic form with intercalated choruses. Throughout the 1920s and 1930s, the vals criollo became the main musical expression of the urban working class, with its lyrics reflecting their cultural personality, conflicts, and value systems. Composers such as Felipe Pinglo Alva, Laureano Martinez, Carlos Saco, Filomeno Ormeño Belmonte, and Alicia Maguiña enriched and drove the music at the time.

== Development ==
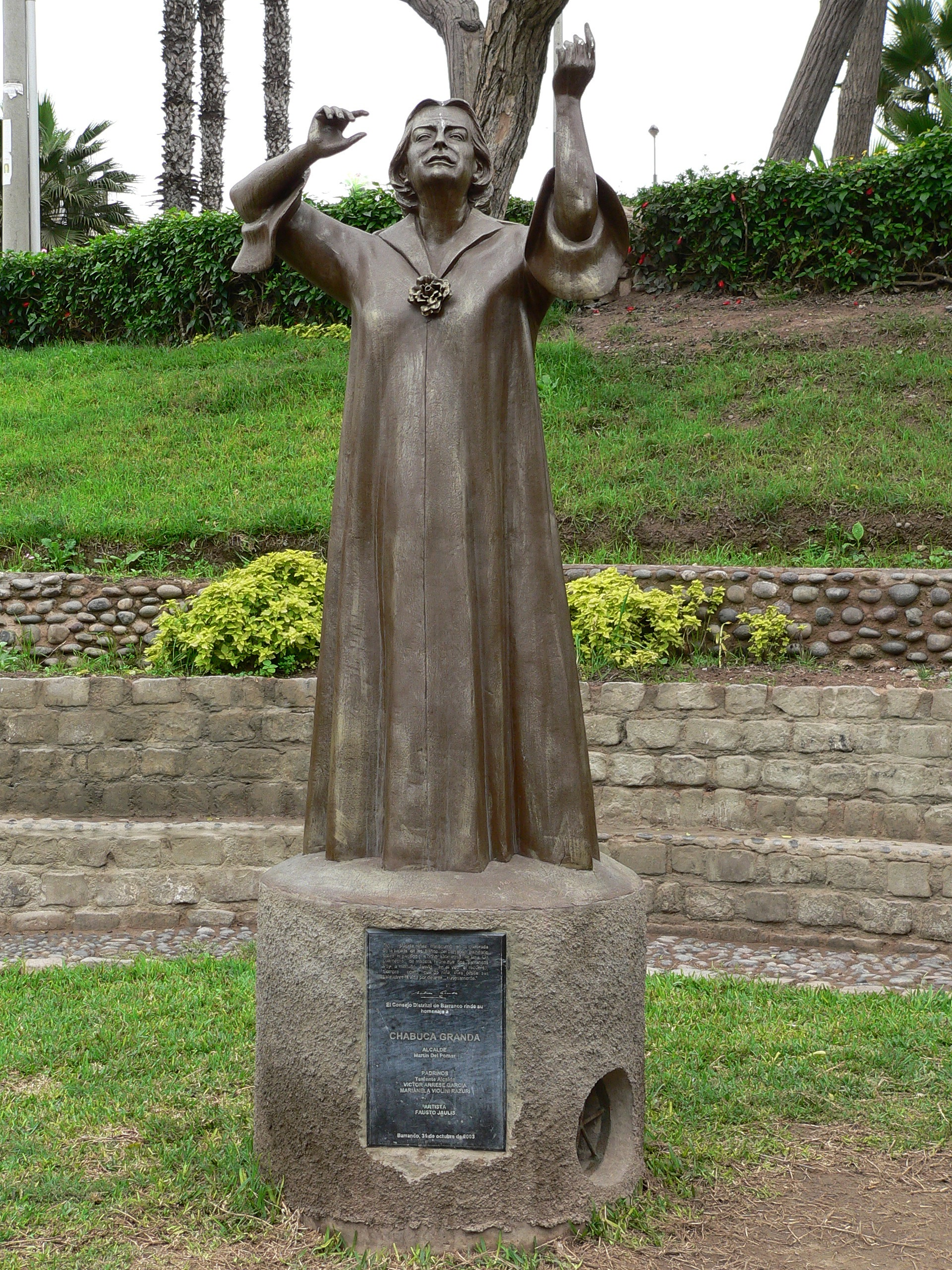
Statue of Chabuca Granda, ambassador of this musical genre.

In the 1940s, groups like Los Trovadores del Perú, Los Chalanes del Perú and later Los Morochucos y Los Embajadores Criollos created a unique sound that made the now called Vals Criollo and music more distinct from the European Waltz and other dances of South America such as the Tango. By the 1950s, popular composer and singer Chabuca Granda helped in making the music widely known throughout Latin America, and the name Vals Peruano in time became used to refer to the dance in countries outside of Peru. In the Argentine tango community a special style of tango developed, adapted to the music of vals criollo, and commonly known simply as vals. Granda's song "La flor de la canela" is considered the unofficial anthem of Lima, the Peruvian capital.

At the height of its national and international popularity, the sounds of the 1950s and into the 1970s were introduced into the Vals Peruano by musicians and singers such as Lucha Reyes, Los Morochucos, Los Troveros Criollos, Fiesta Criolla and later on Eva Ayllón, Arturo Cavero and Oscar Avilés.

In modern times, the Vals Peruano, although softer and less traditional than before, still remains a widely popular symbol of Peruvian culture and still holds a certain degree of popularity in Latin American society.

== Music ==
Musica criolla such as the vals criollo typically includes two main instruments that symbolically represent European and African heritage: the guitar and the cajón. Typically, the lead guitarist plays solos and strongly plucked phrases on the upper strings, while a second guitarist performs riffs (bordones) on the two lowest strings and strums rhythmically. In the early part of the twentieth century, guitars, hand clapping and singing were the traditional instrumentation. By the mid-twentieth century, the cajón was incorporated, providing a rhythmic base for the music.

== See also ==
- Desde el Alma, Yo la quería patita, famous Peruvian waltzes
