= Parque de las Leyendas =

Park, zoo and botanical garden in Lima, Peru

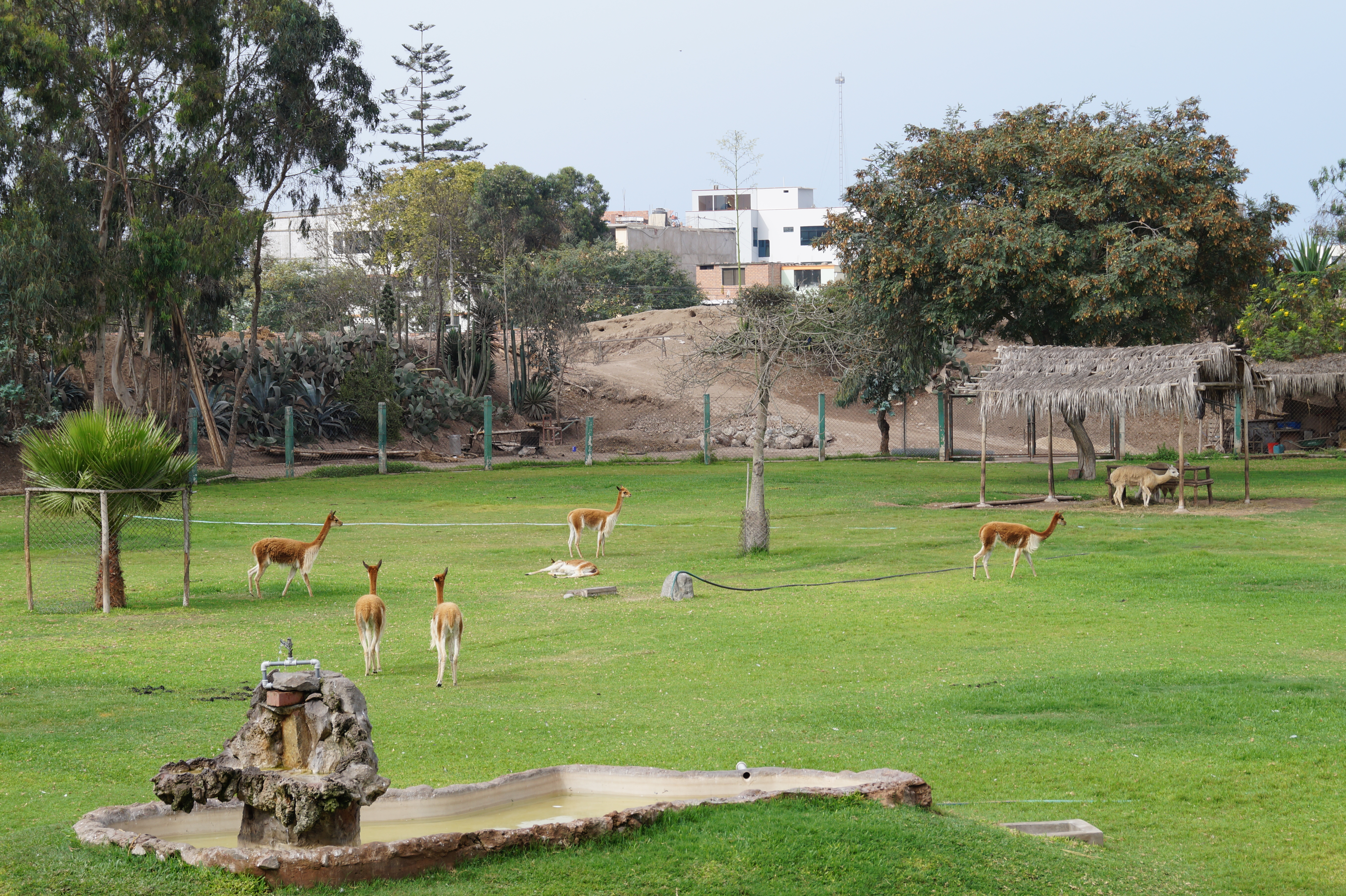
- Interactive map of Parque de las Leyendas
- 12.0676384°S 77.0867131°W
- Location: Lima, Peru
- Land area: 970 000 m²
- No. of animals: 2071
- No. of species: 215
- Website: https://www.leyendas.gob.pe

The Park of Legends (Spanish: Parque de las Leyendas), formally the Dr. Felipe Benavides Barreda Park of Legends (Spanish: Parque de las Leyendas "Dr. Felipe Benavides Barreda"), is a zoo located in San Miguel District, Lima, Peru. It is managed by the Metropolitan Municipality of Lima (MML). It is the most influential and visited zoo in the entire capital, featuring recreation and entertainment areas, archaeological museums, and botanical garden.

Since 2023, another branch has operated in Ate District with the same name after the MML acquired the Huachipa Recreational Ecological Centre (Spanish: Centro Ecológico Recreacional Huachipa), commonly known simply as Huachipa Zoo (Spanish: Zoológico de Huachipa).

== History ==
The park was founded by renowned conservationist Felipe Benavides Barreda, from Lima, in the Pando area of San Miguel during the government of Fernando Belaúnde Terry in 1964. It was originally named "Las Leyendas," and popular usage apparently led to a change in the name to "De Las Leyendas," as it is officially known today. The name comes from the Inca and pre-Inca legends that were illustrated by Sabino Springett and displayed on walls at the entrance. These illustrations were removed around 2008, and currently, only the texts remain in the well-known attraction called the "Patio de Leyendas" (Courtyard of Legends) within the Cultural Park.

In 1970, Barranco Zoo (Spanish: Zoológico de Barranco) was permanently closed (currently functioning as Luis Gálvez Chipoco Stadium), and all the animals housed there were relocated from Barranco District to the park in San Miguel. Of these animals, a number still live, such as a female Tumbes crocodile known as Naylamp and two Galápagos tortoises known as Sansón and Job, both weighing 220 kg each. The three arrived at the zoo in 1963.

The park, specifically the Board of Trustees (PATPAL), was under the administration of the central government for several years: initially through PARNAZ (Patronato de Parques Nacionales y Zonales) and SERPAR (Servicio de Parques de Lima), later under the ministries of Housing, Presidency, and finally that of Women and Social Development. However, by the end of the 2000s, Law No. 28998 of 2007 ultimately granted the administration of the park to the Metropolitan Municipality of Lima.

== Gallery ==
=== Coastal area ===
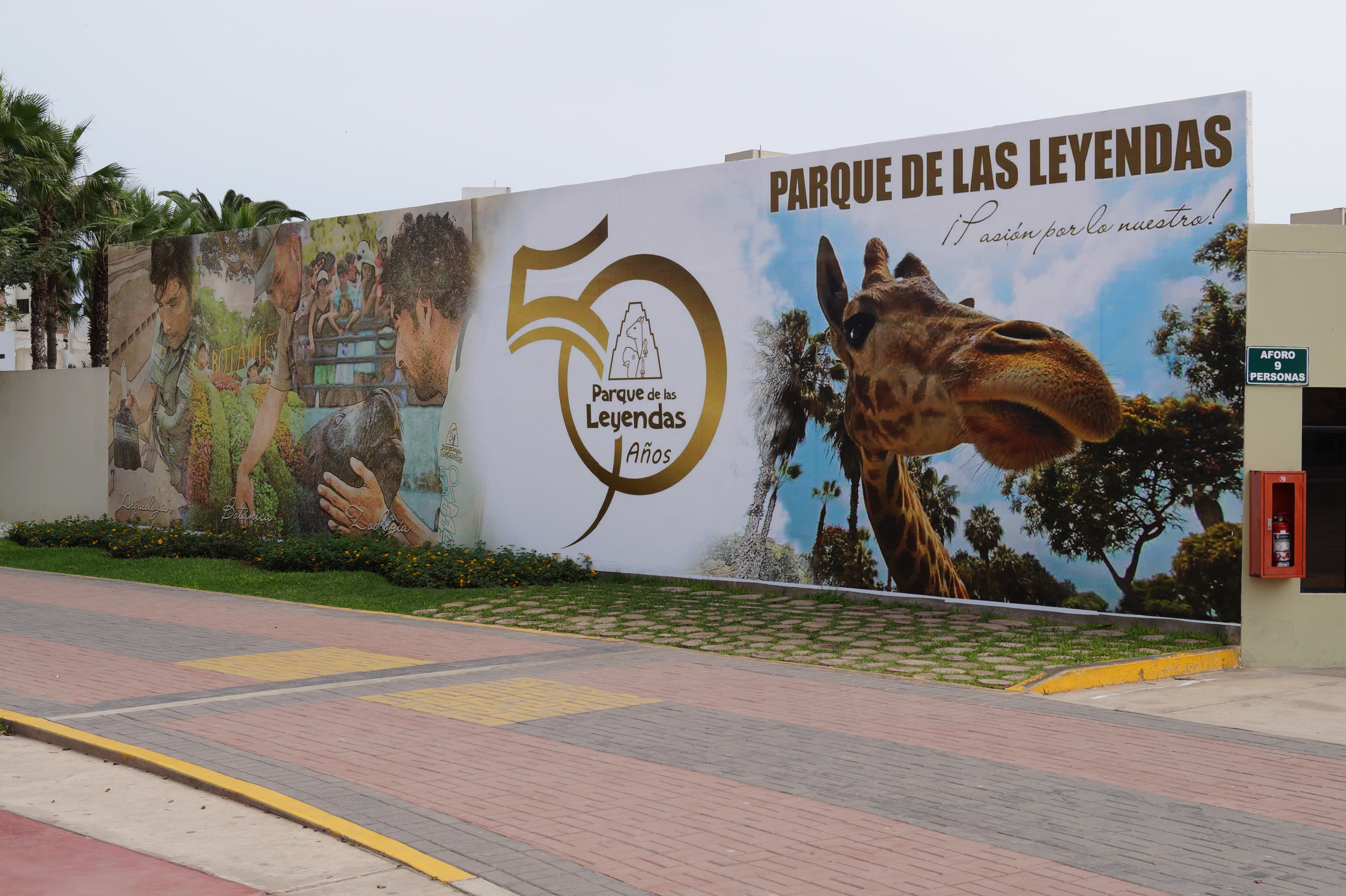
Celebration of the zoo's 50'th anniversary

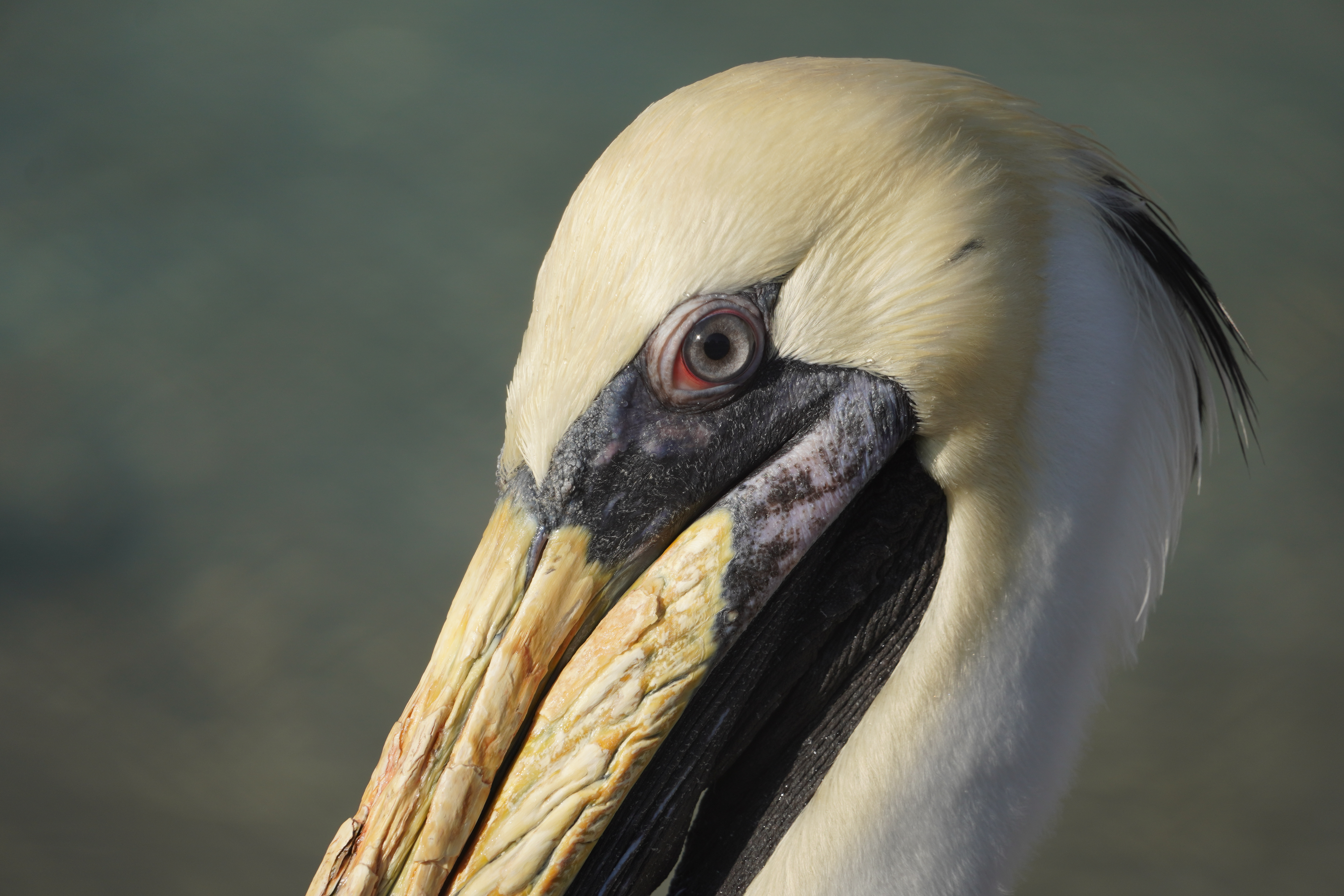
Brown Pelican

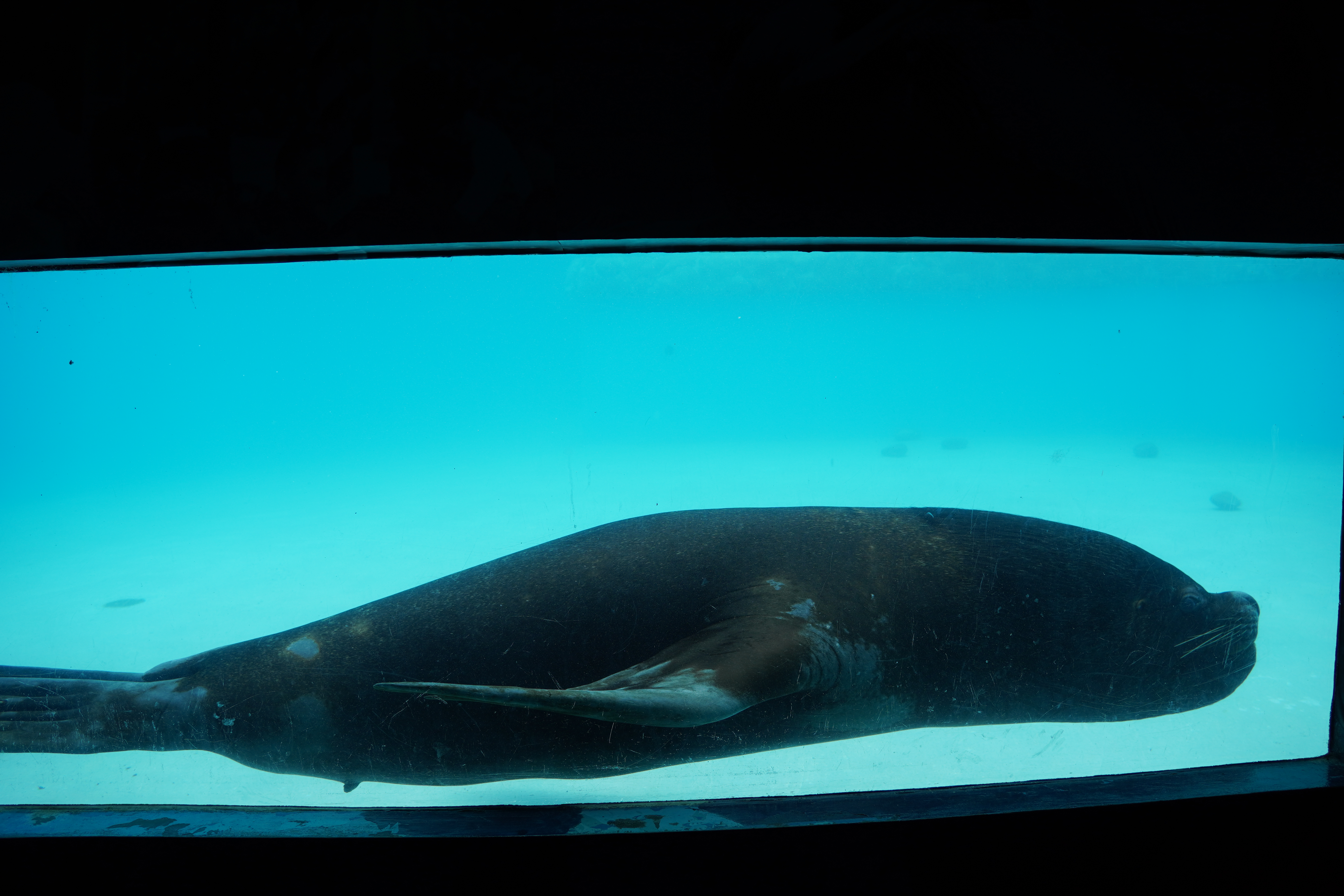
Male South American Sea lion

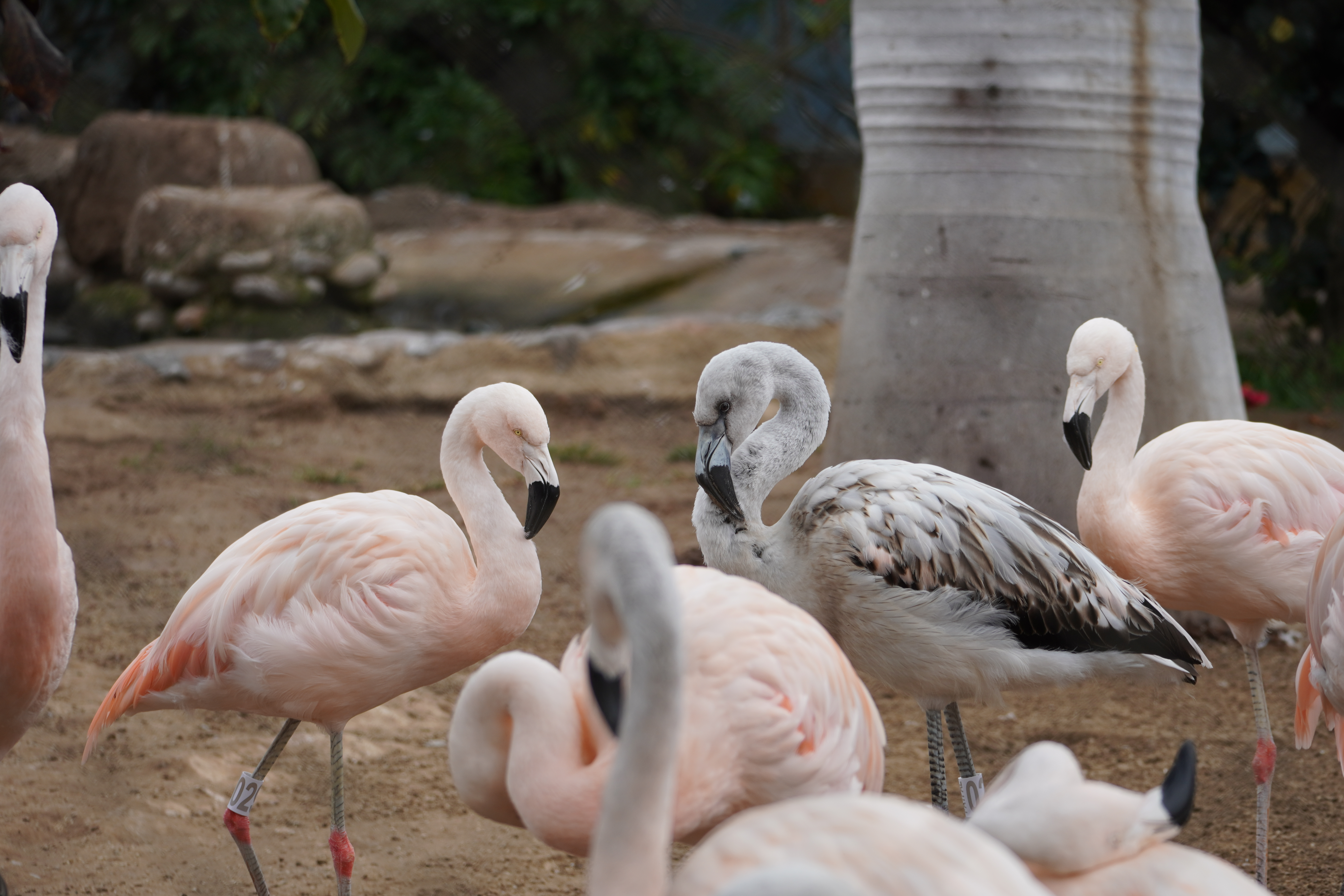
Chilean Flamingo

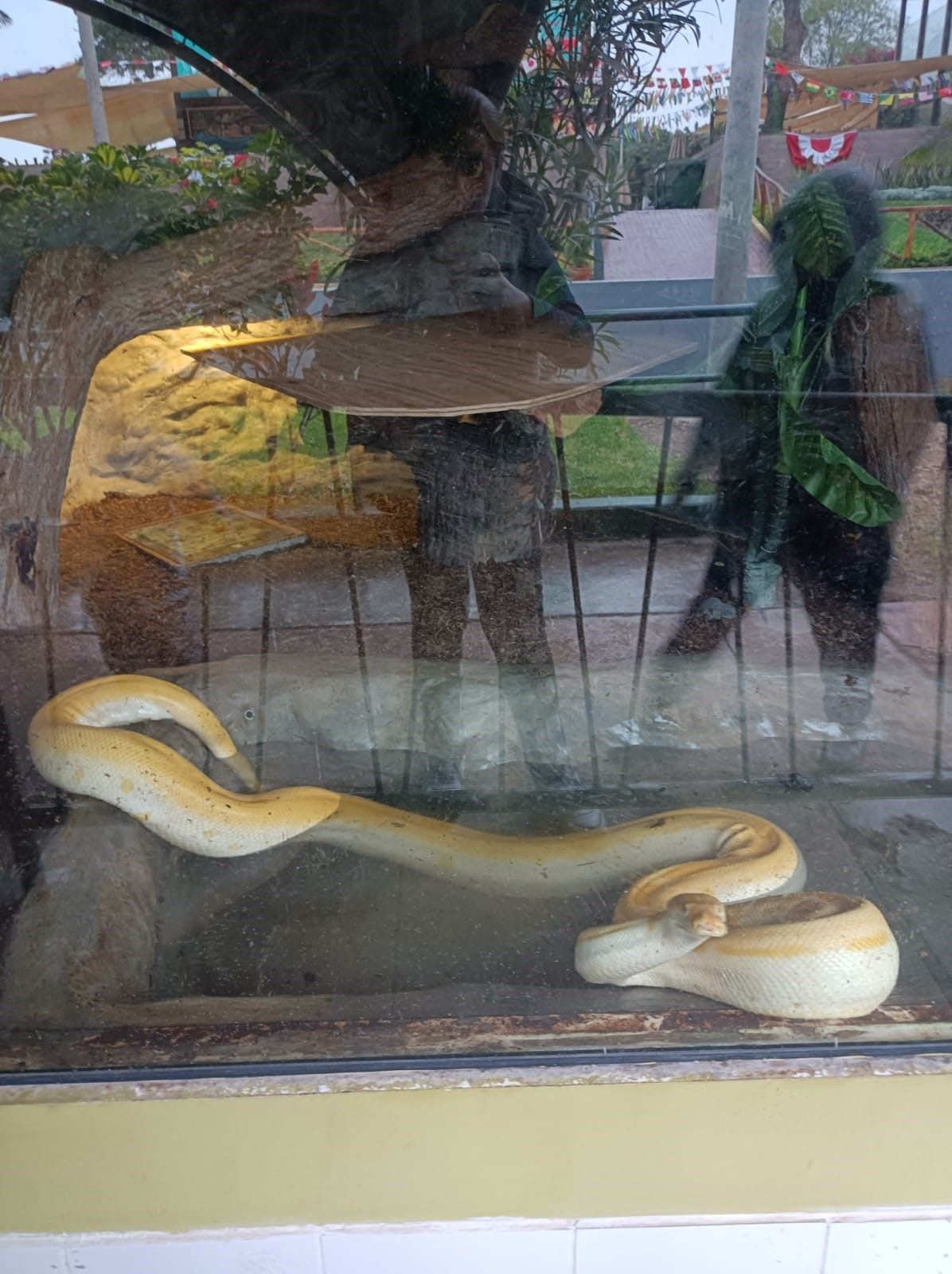
Amelanistic Burmese python

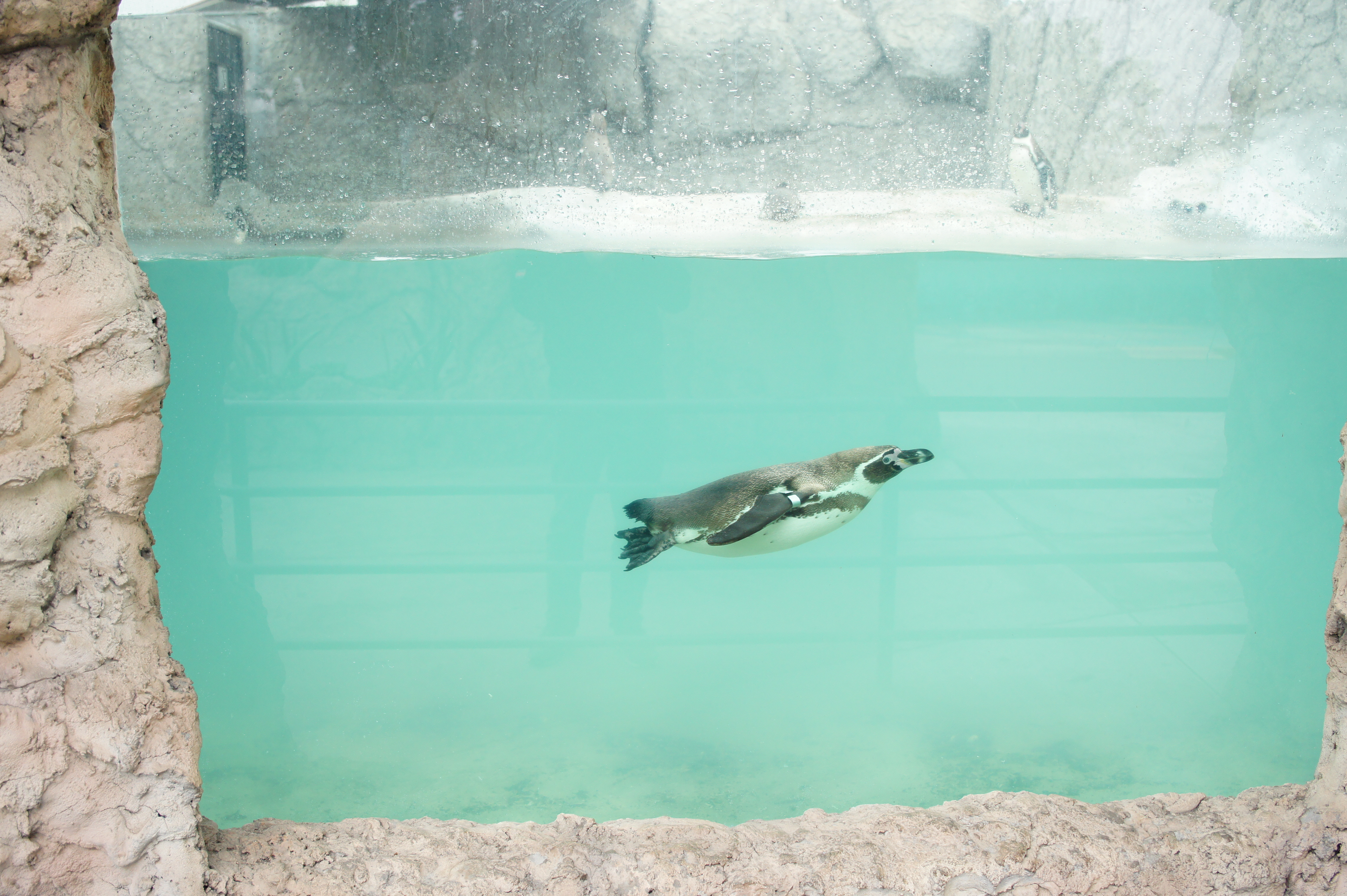
Humbolt Penguin swimming

=== Andean area ===
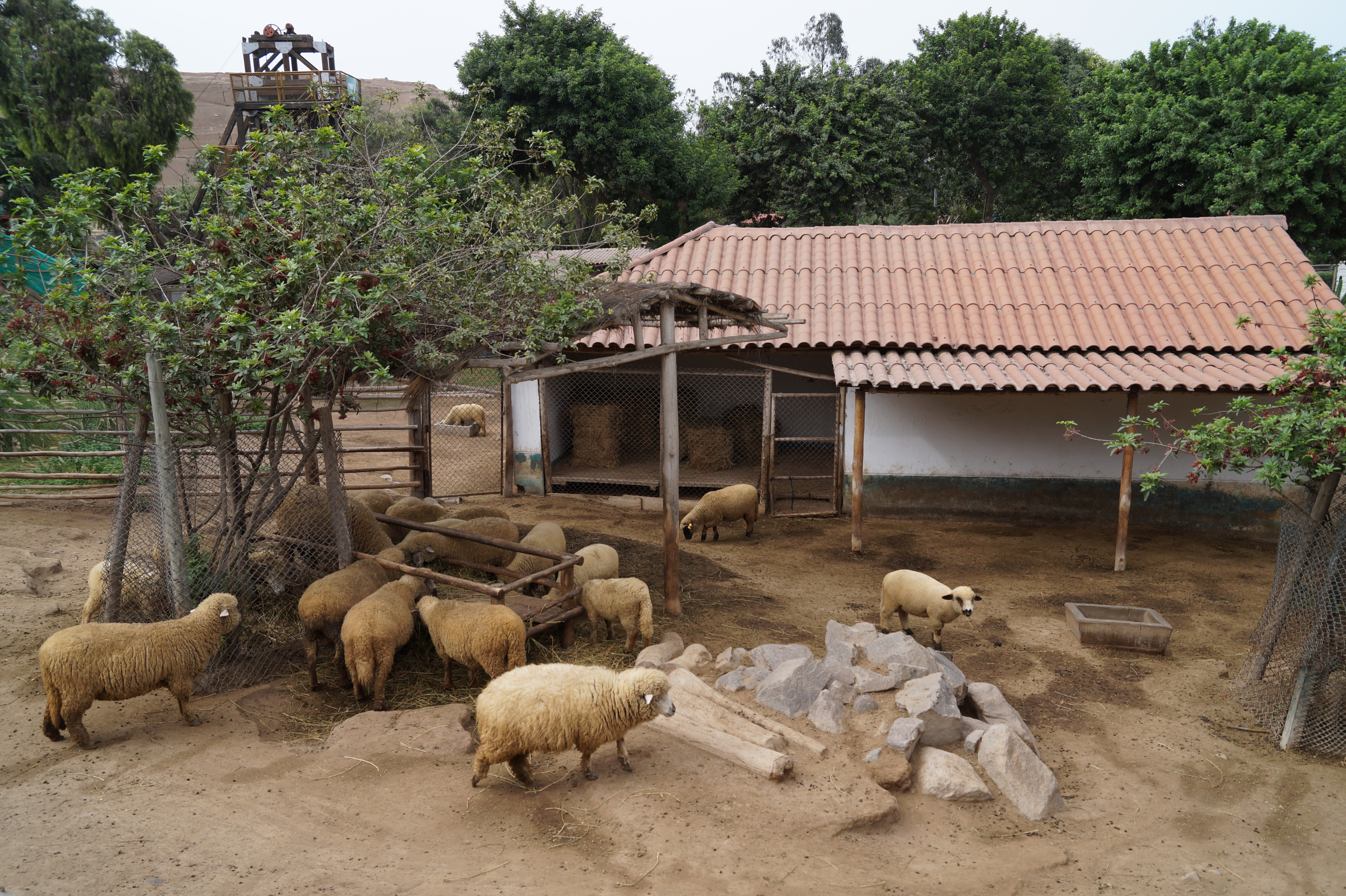
Domestic sheep

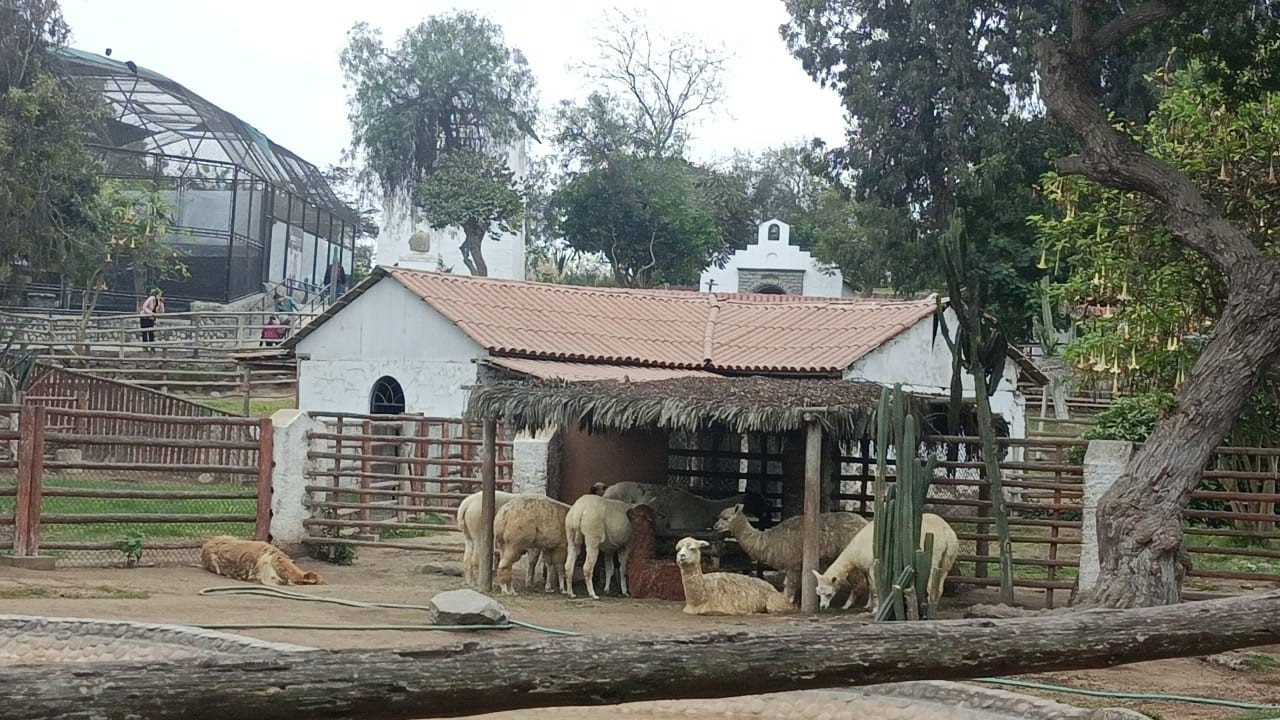
Vicuñas, Alpacas and Llamas

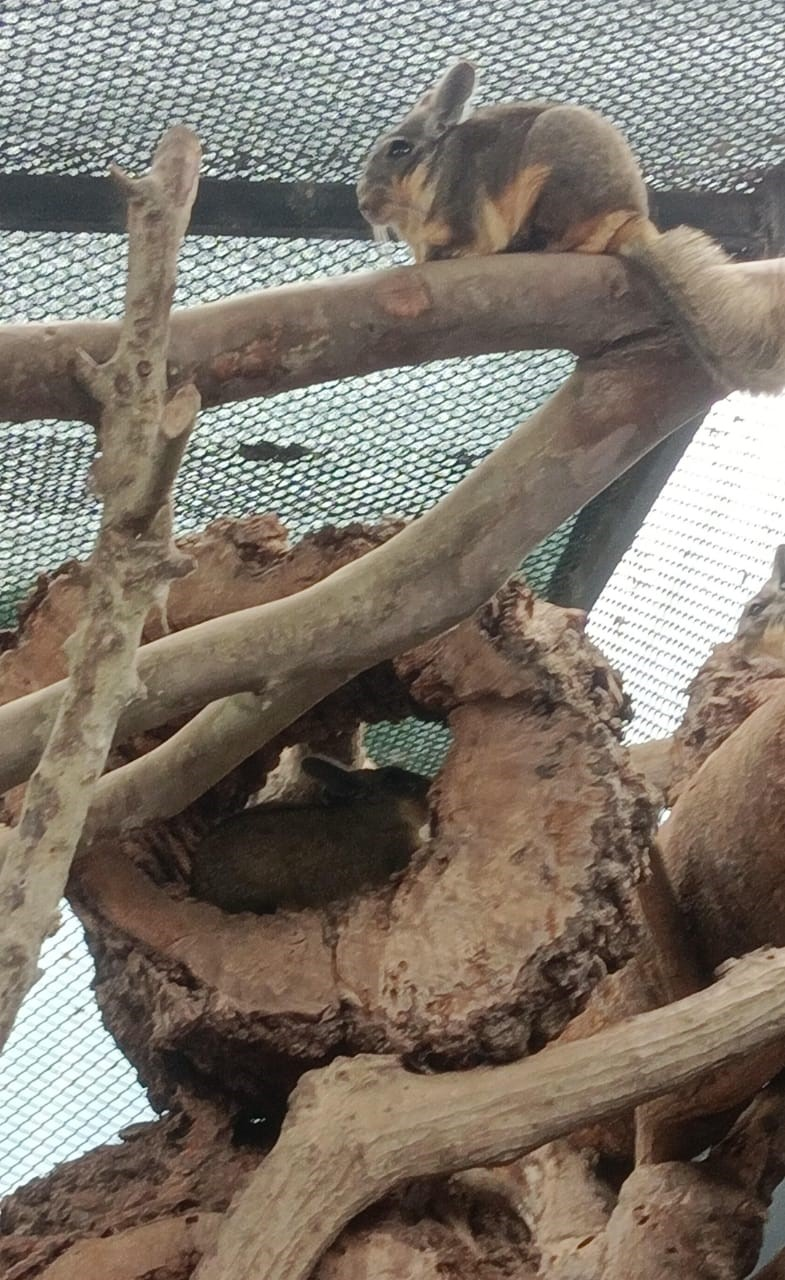
Viscacha

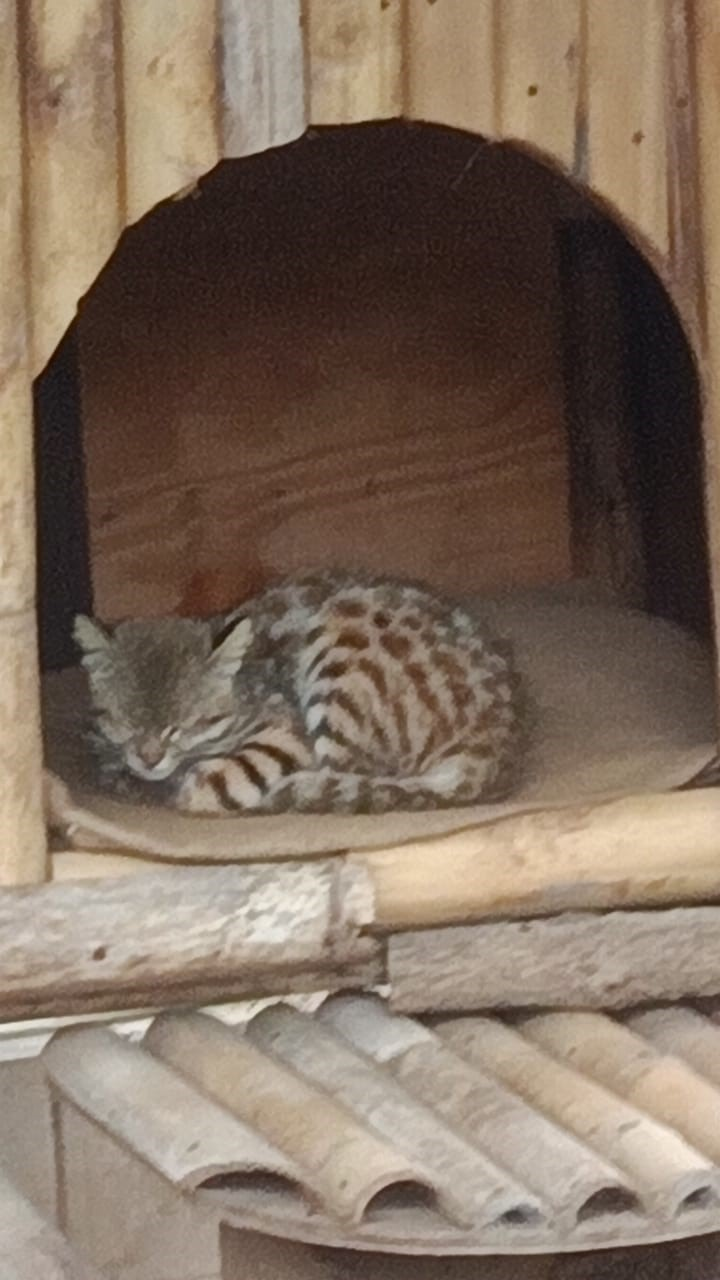
Pampas cat

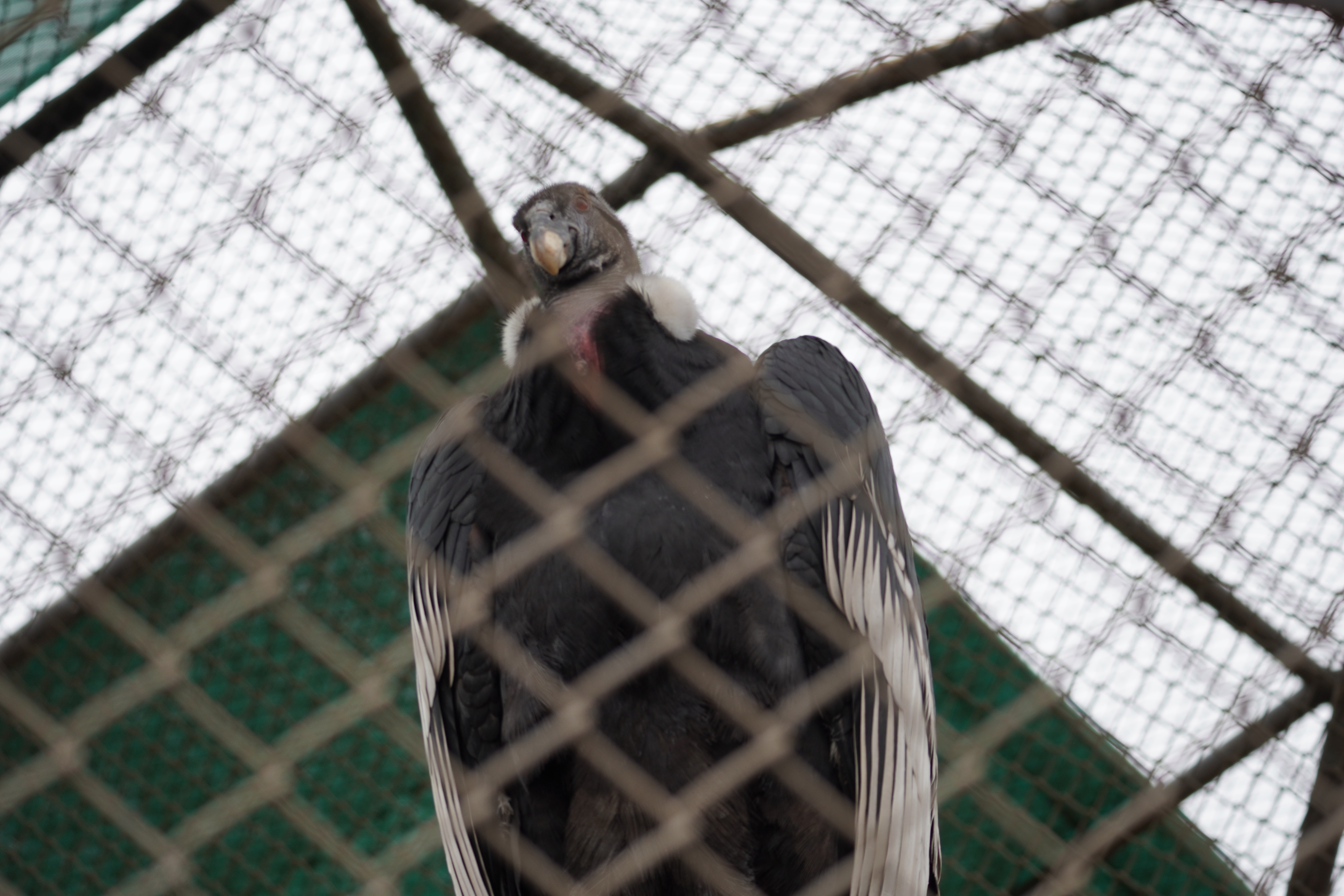
Female Andean Condor

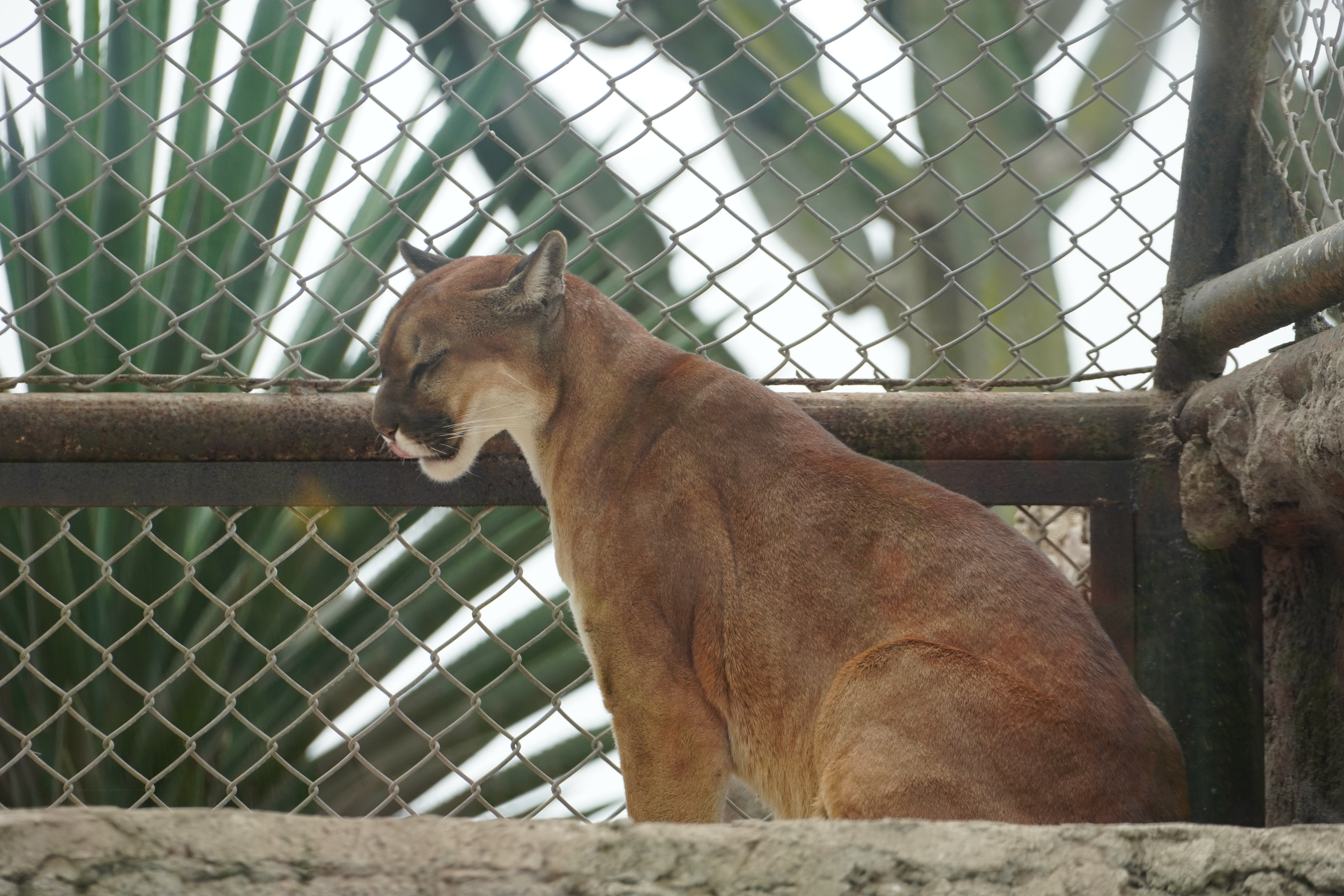
Cougar

=== Rainforest(Amazon) area ===
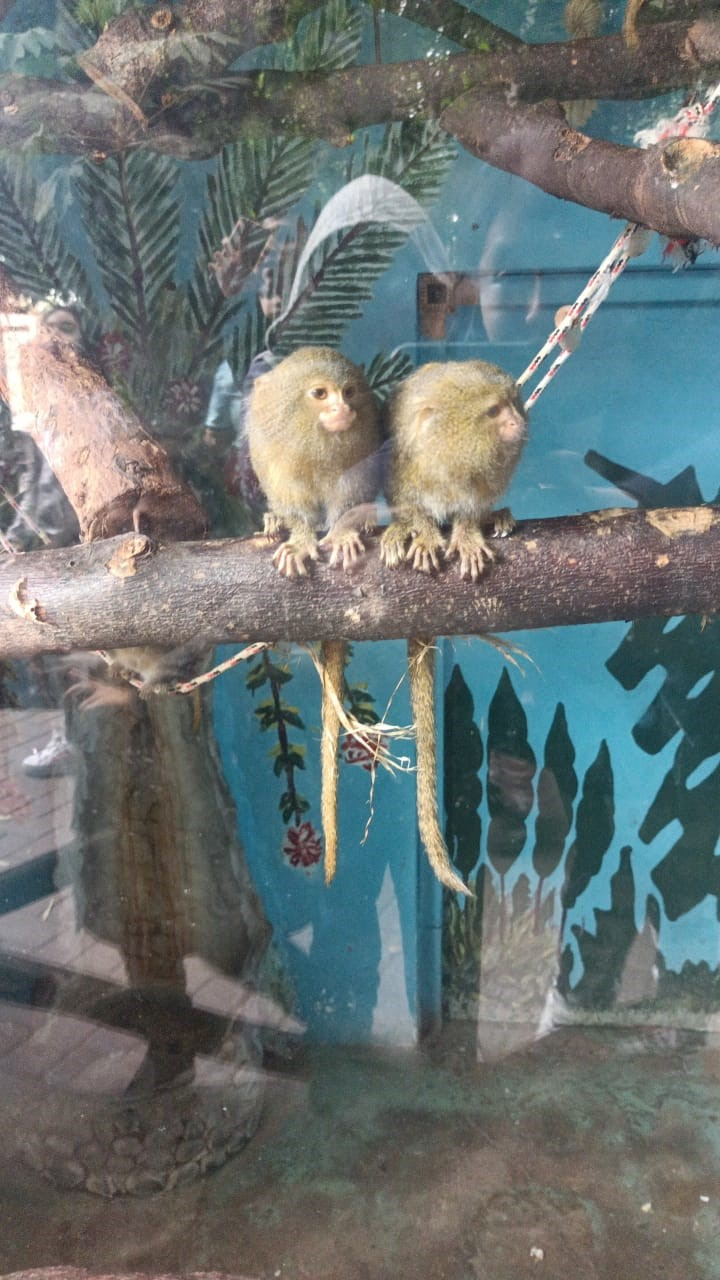
Western pygmy marmoset

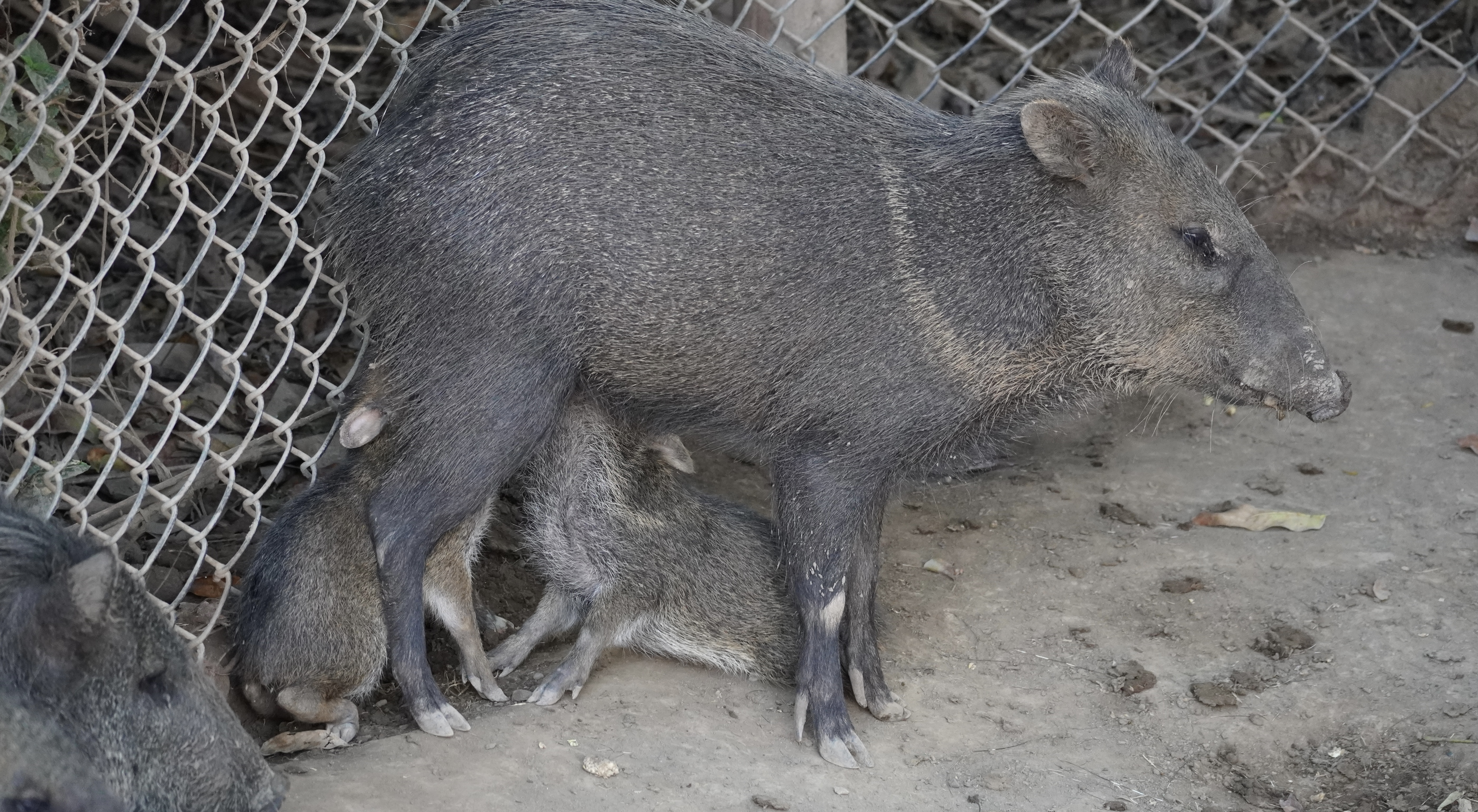
Collared peccary nursing towards its young

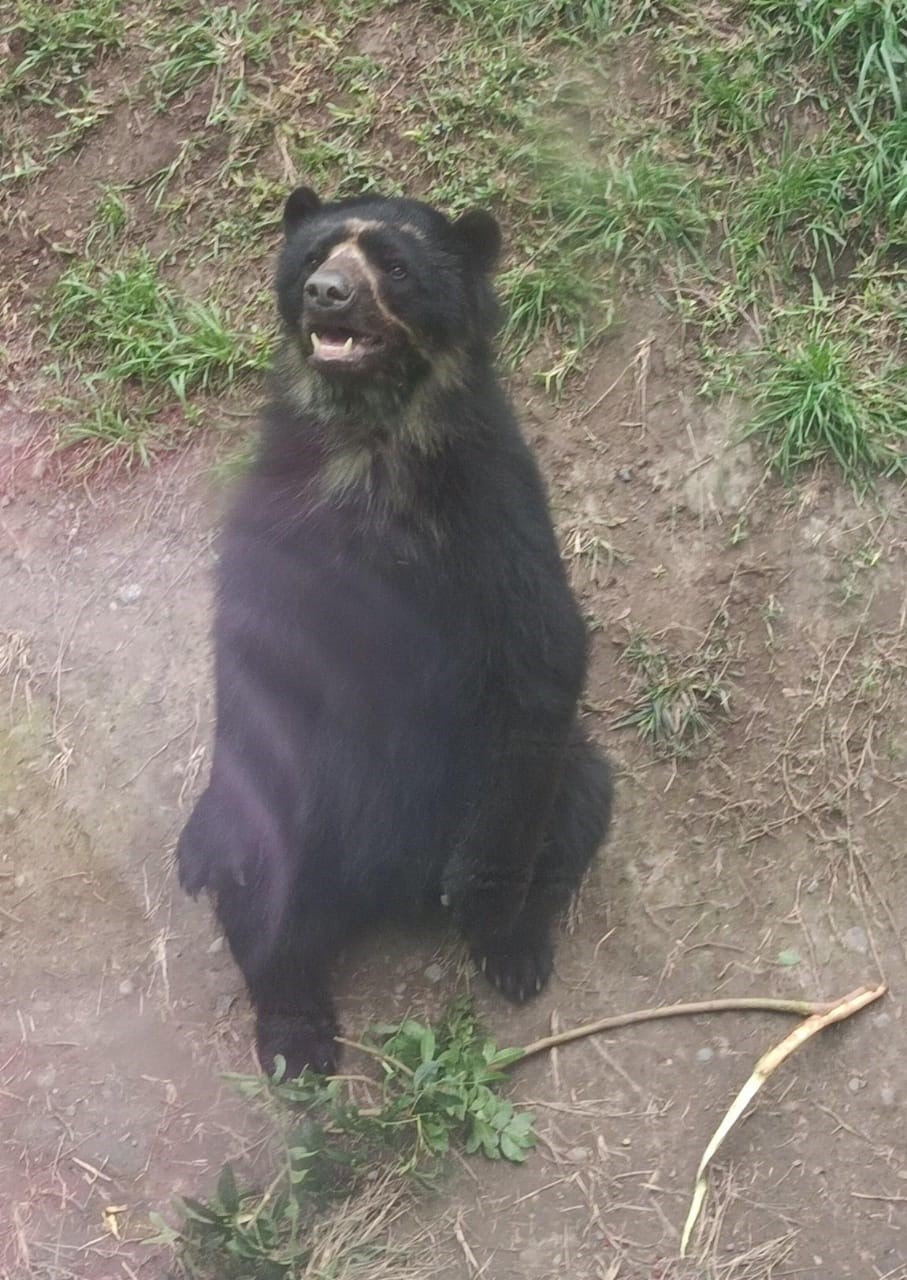
Spectacled Bear

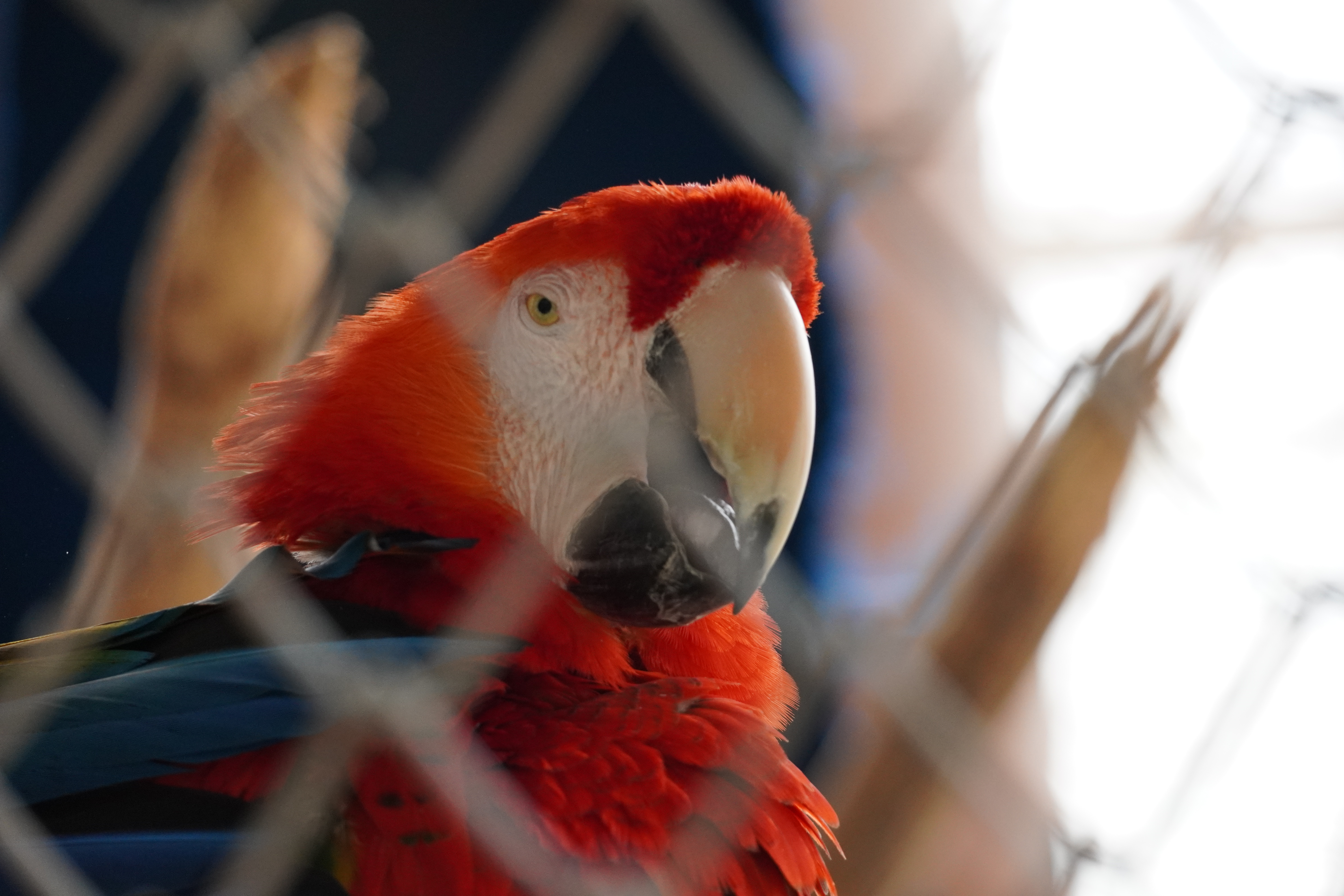
Scarlet Macaw

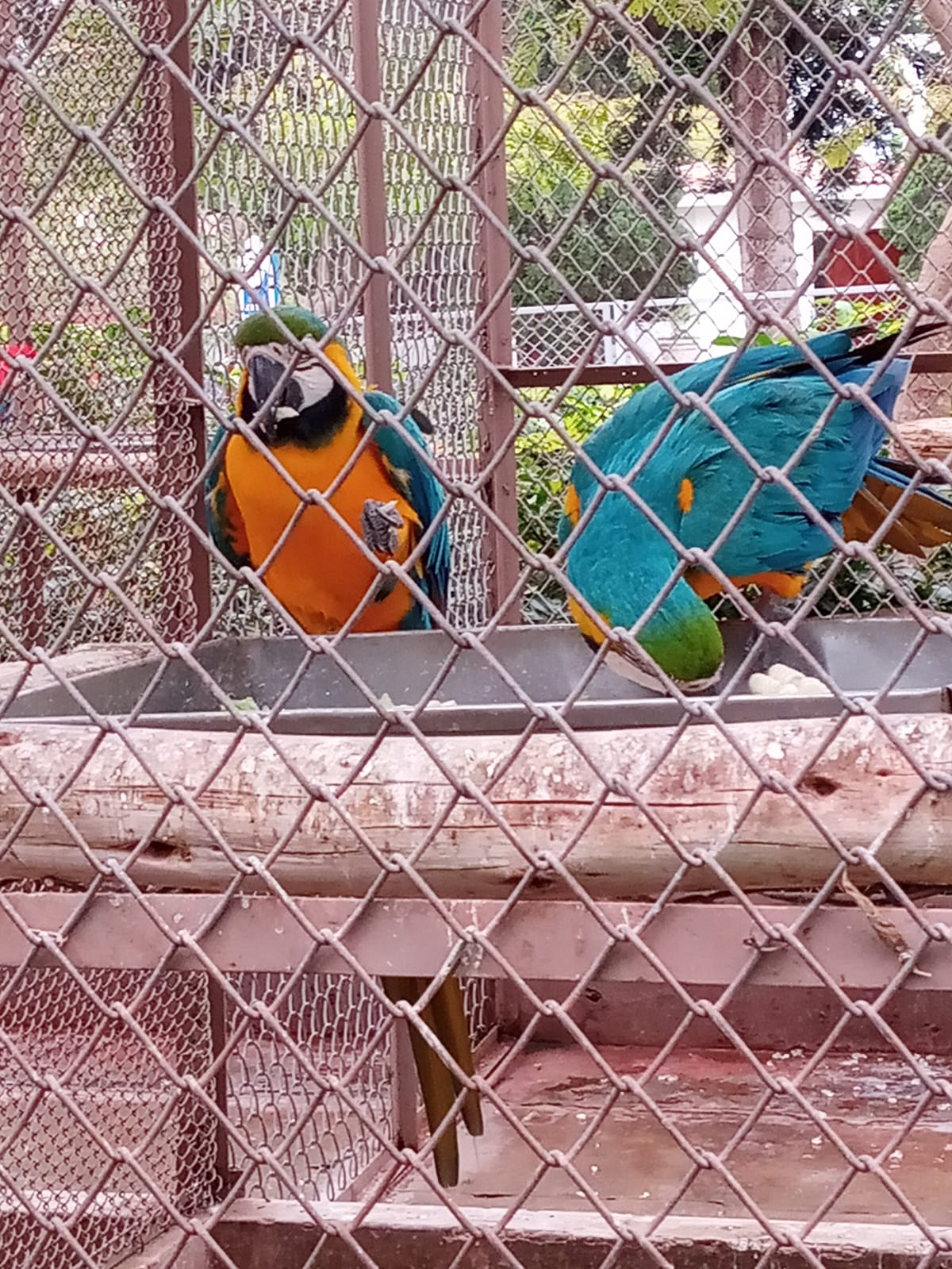
Blue-and-yellow macaw

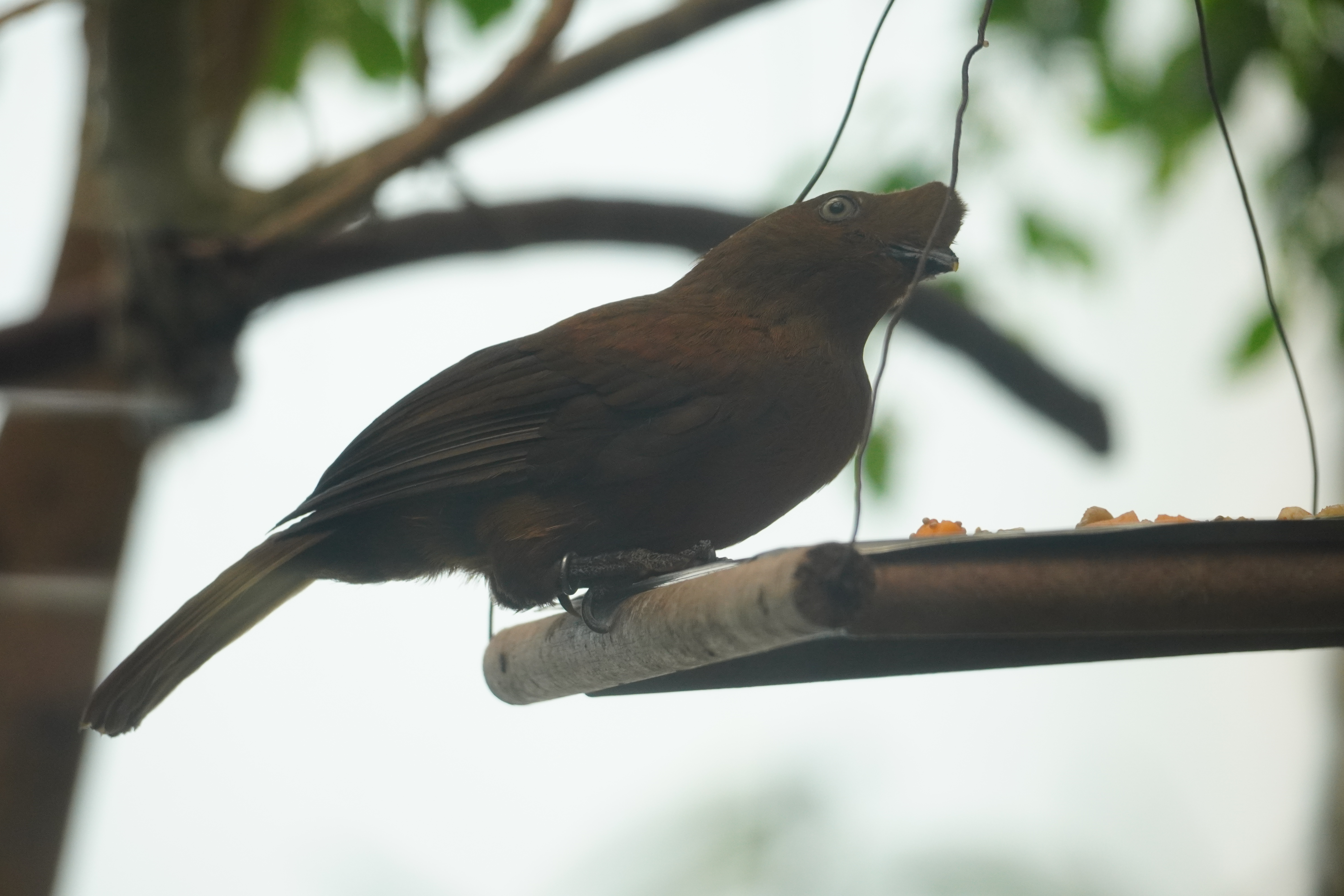
Female Andean cock-of-the-rock

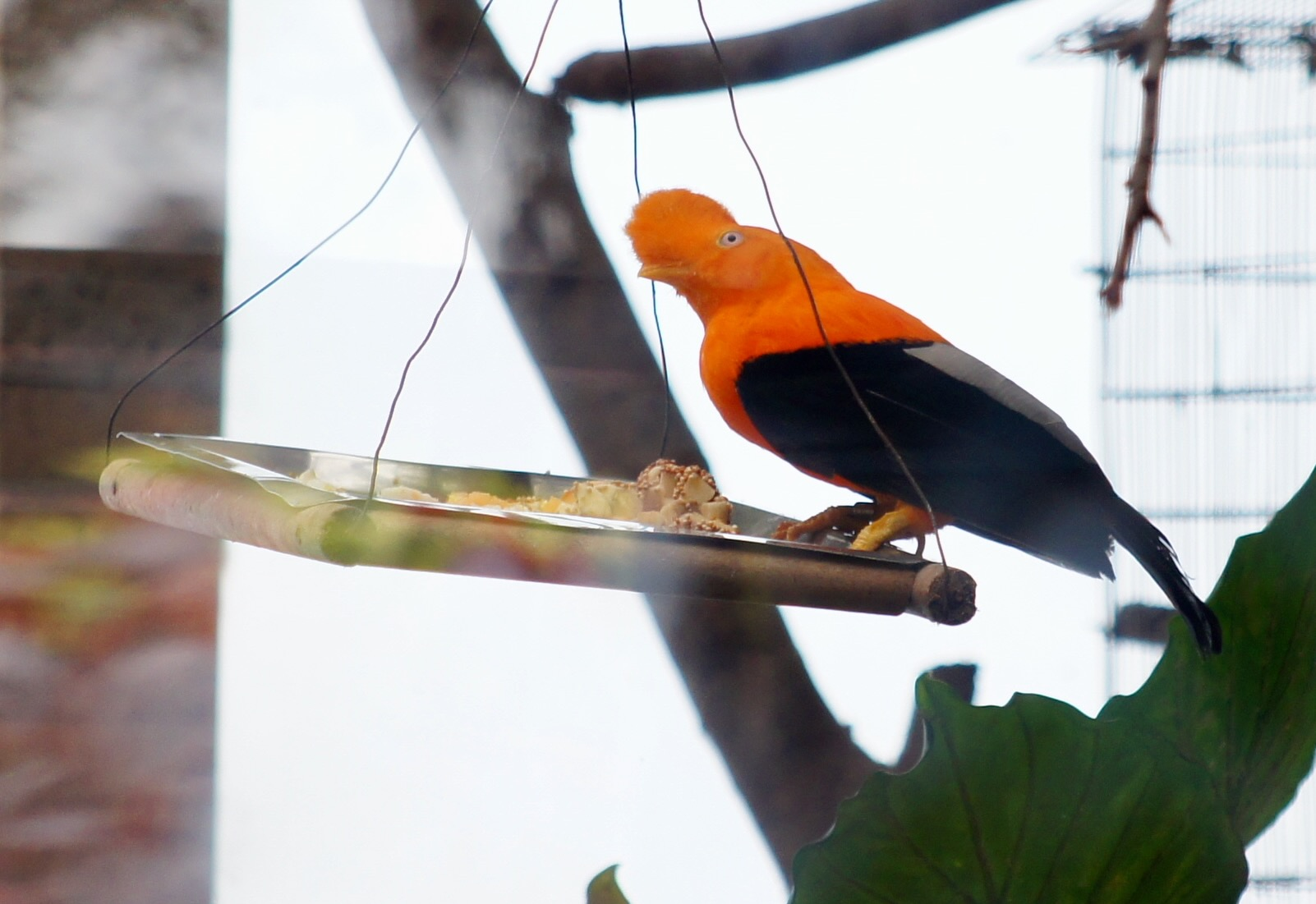
Male Andean cock-of-the-rock

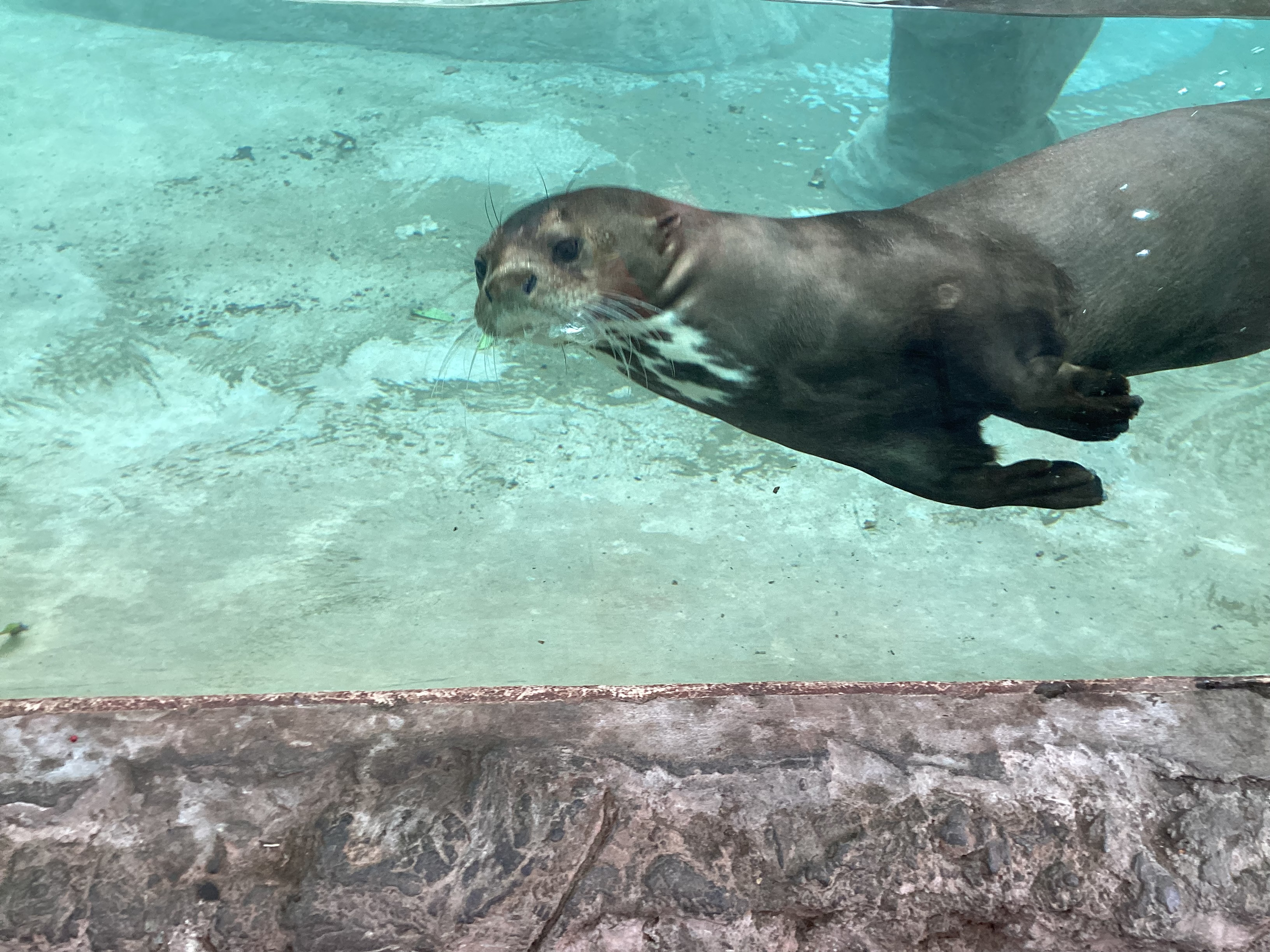
Giant otter

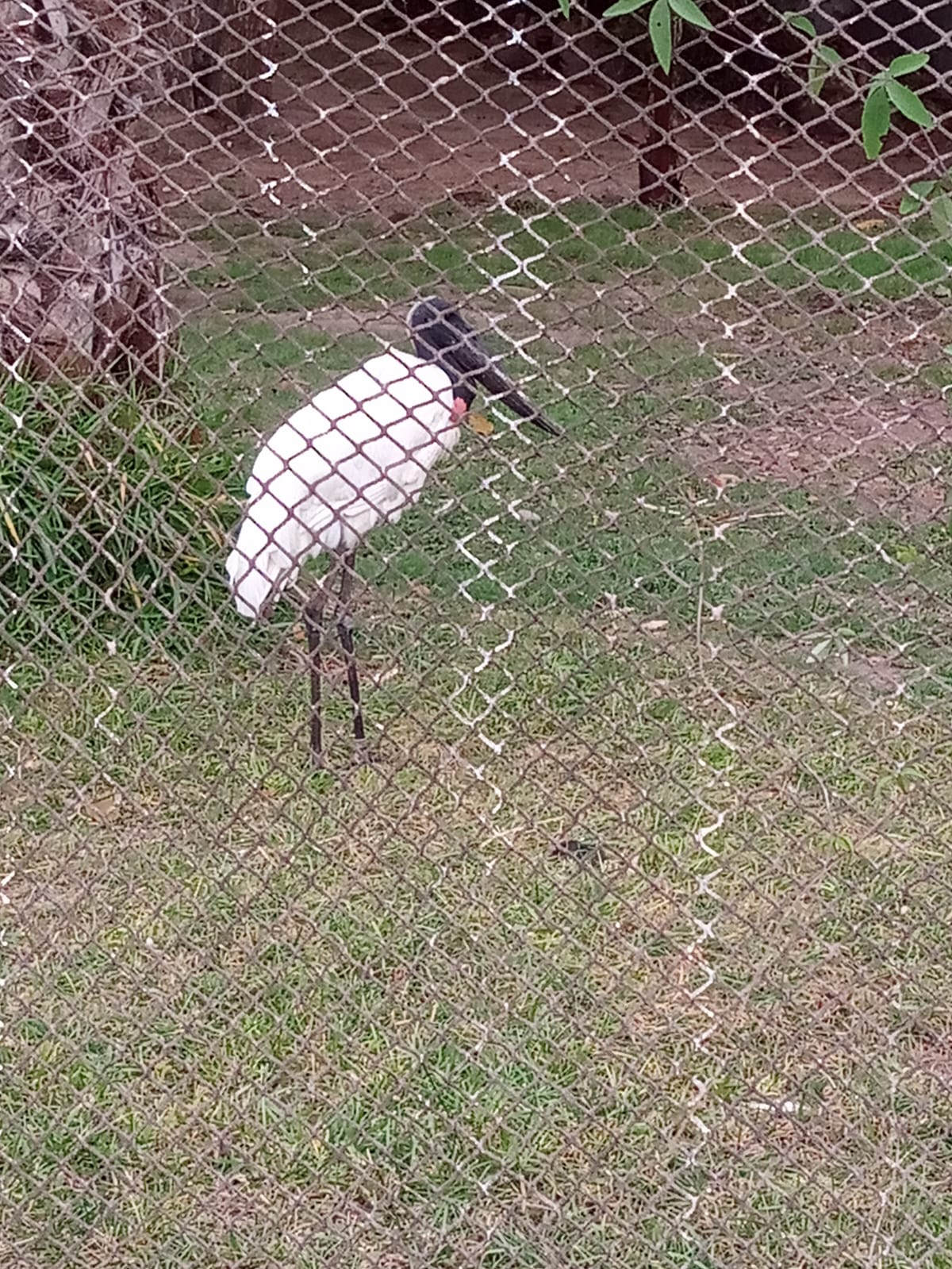
Jabiru

=== International area ===
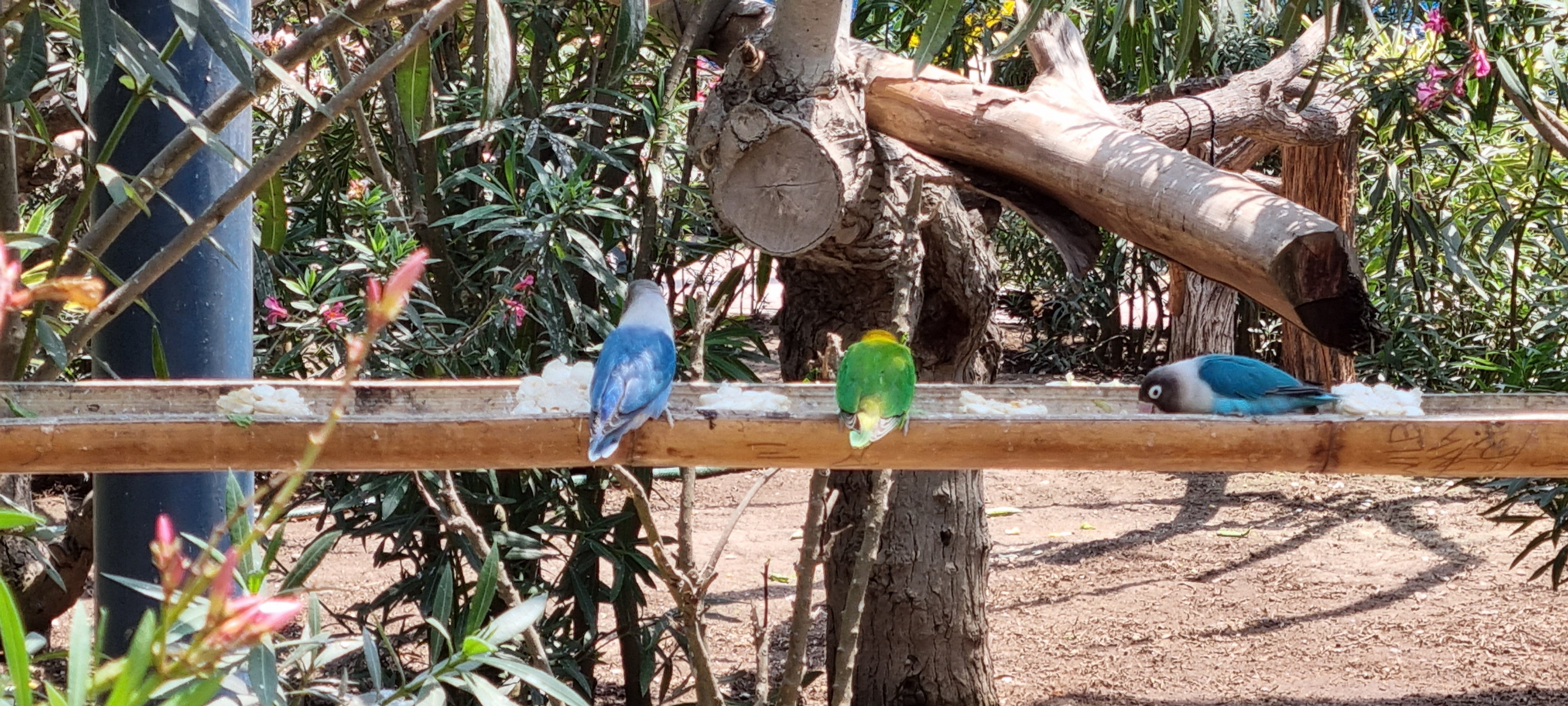
Color morphs of Yellow-collared lovebird on the Aviary

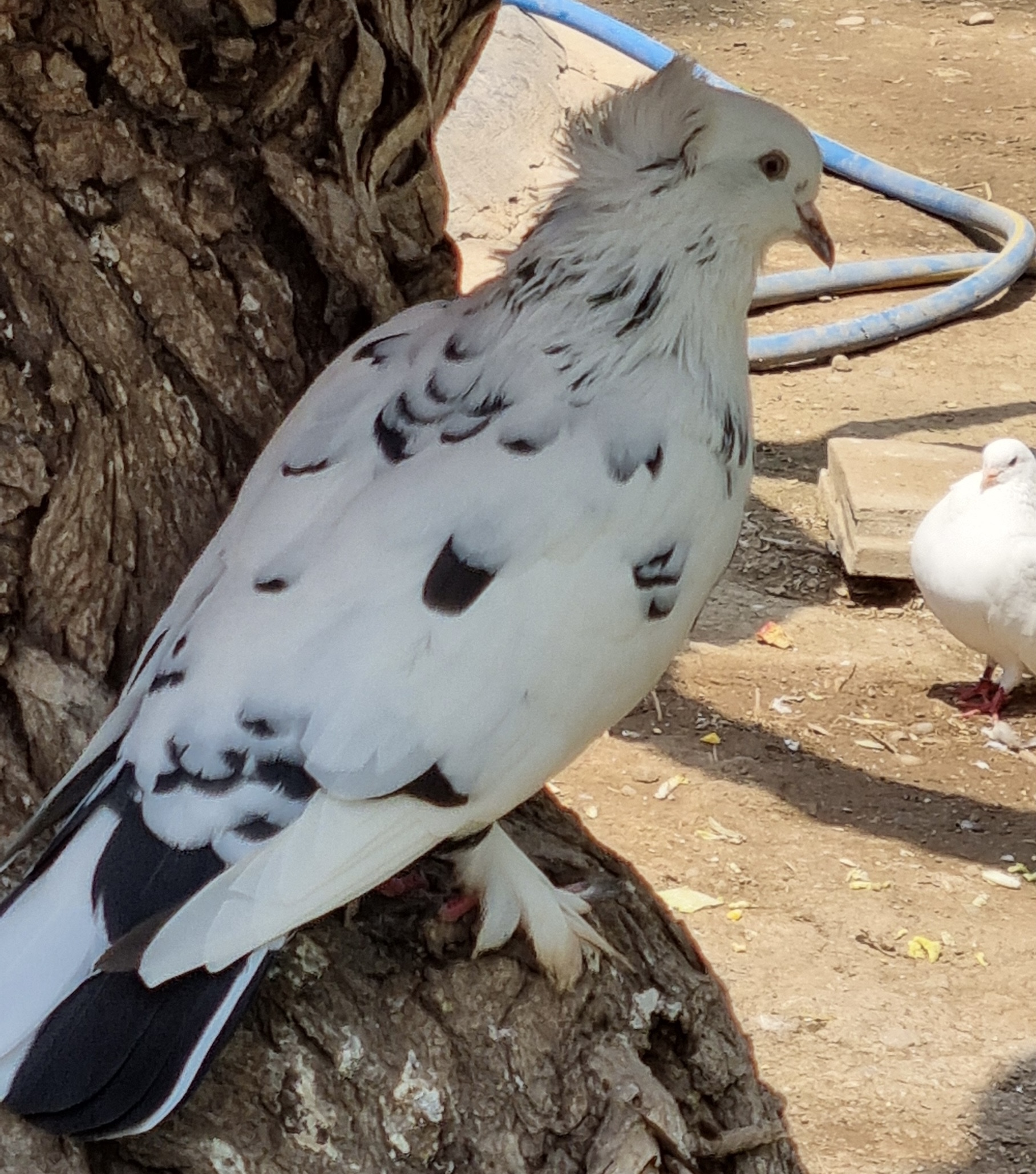
Domestic Pigeon in the Aviary

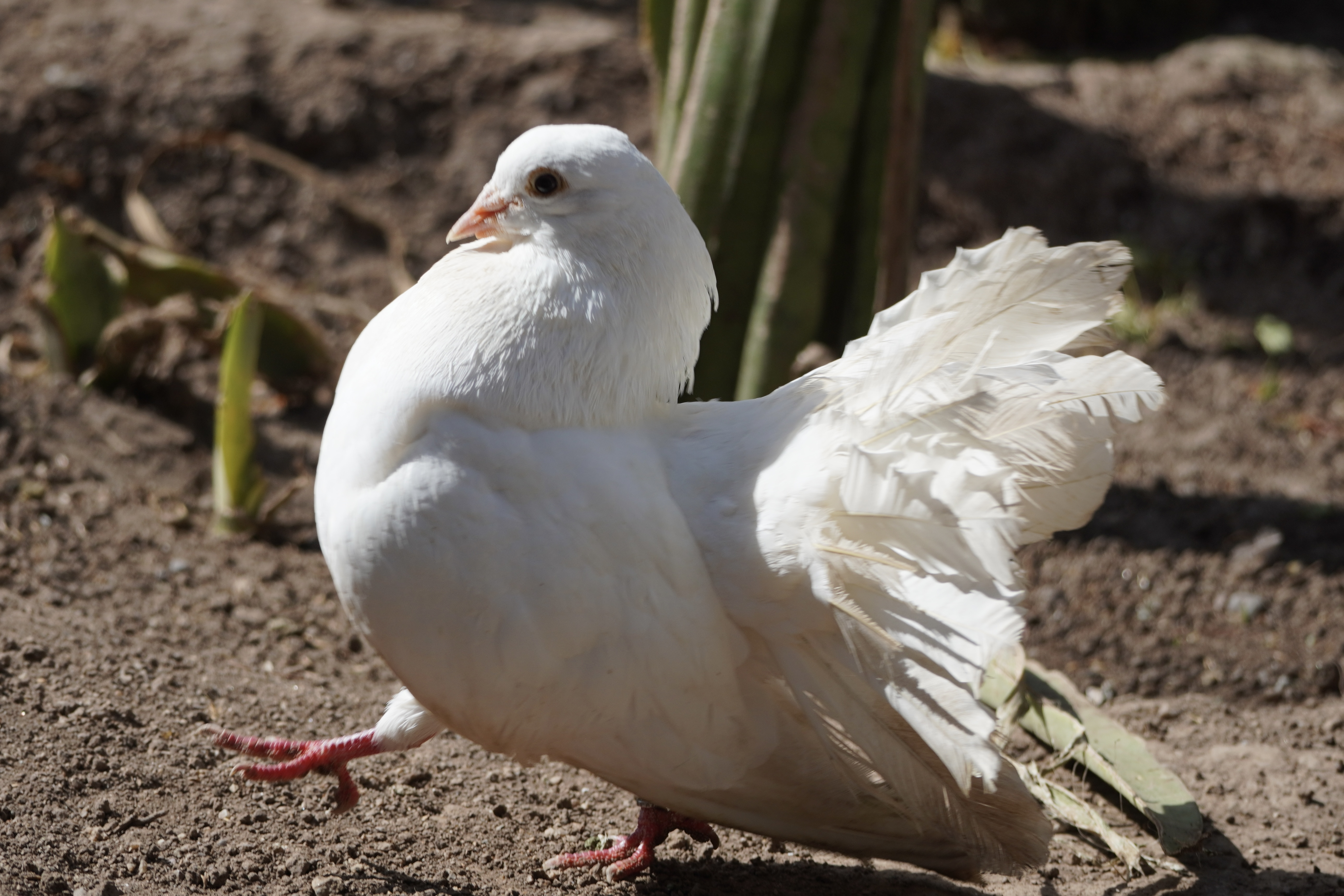
White English Fantail from the Aviary

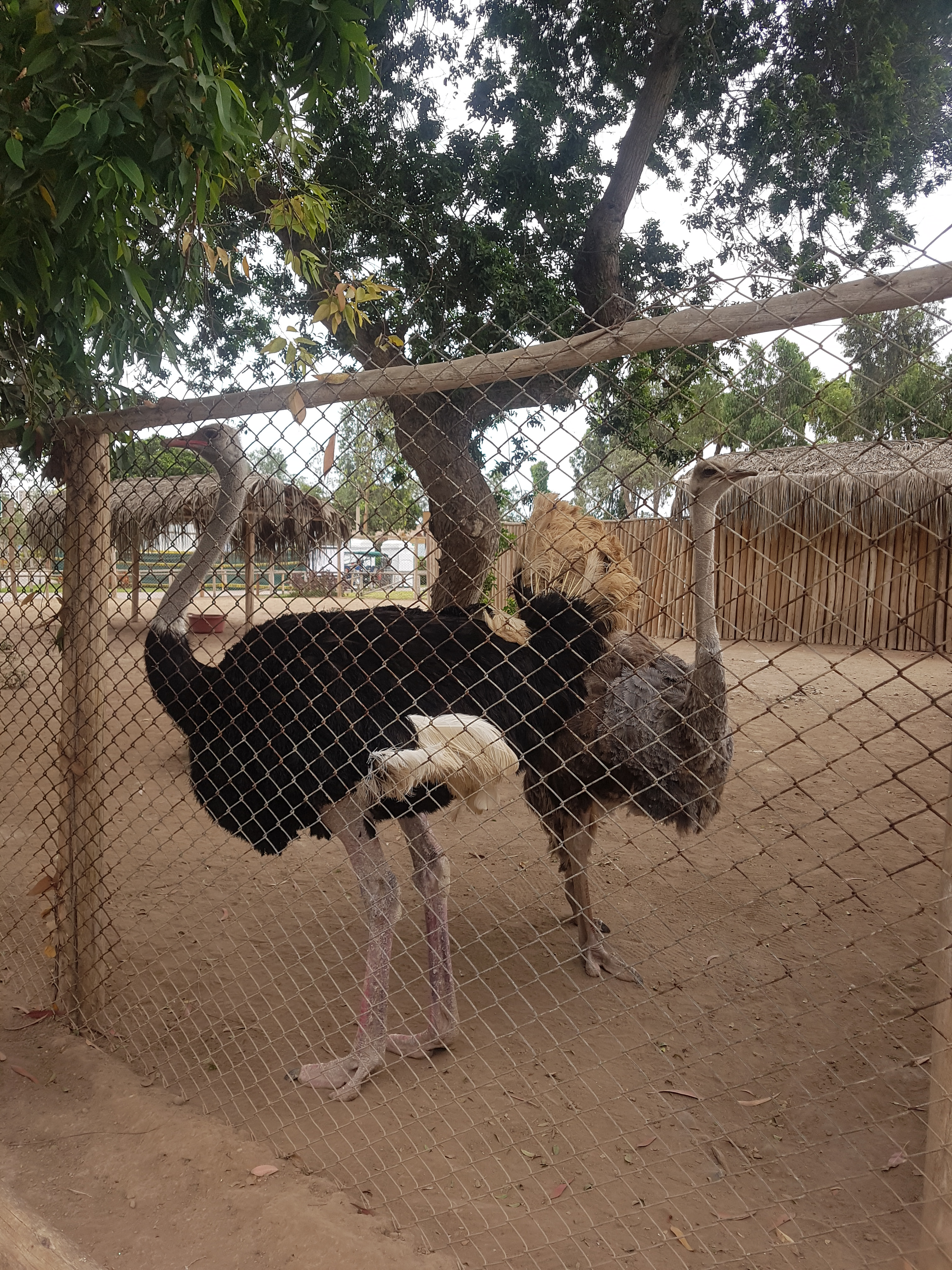
Male (front) and Female (back) Common ostriches

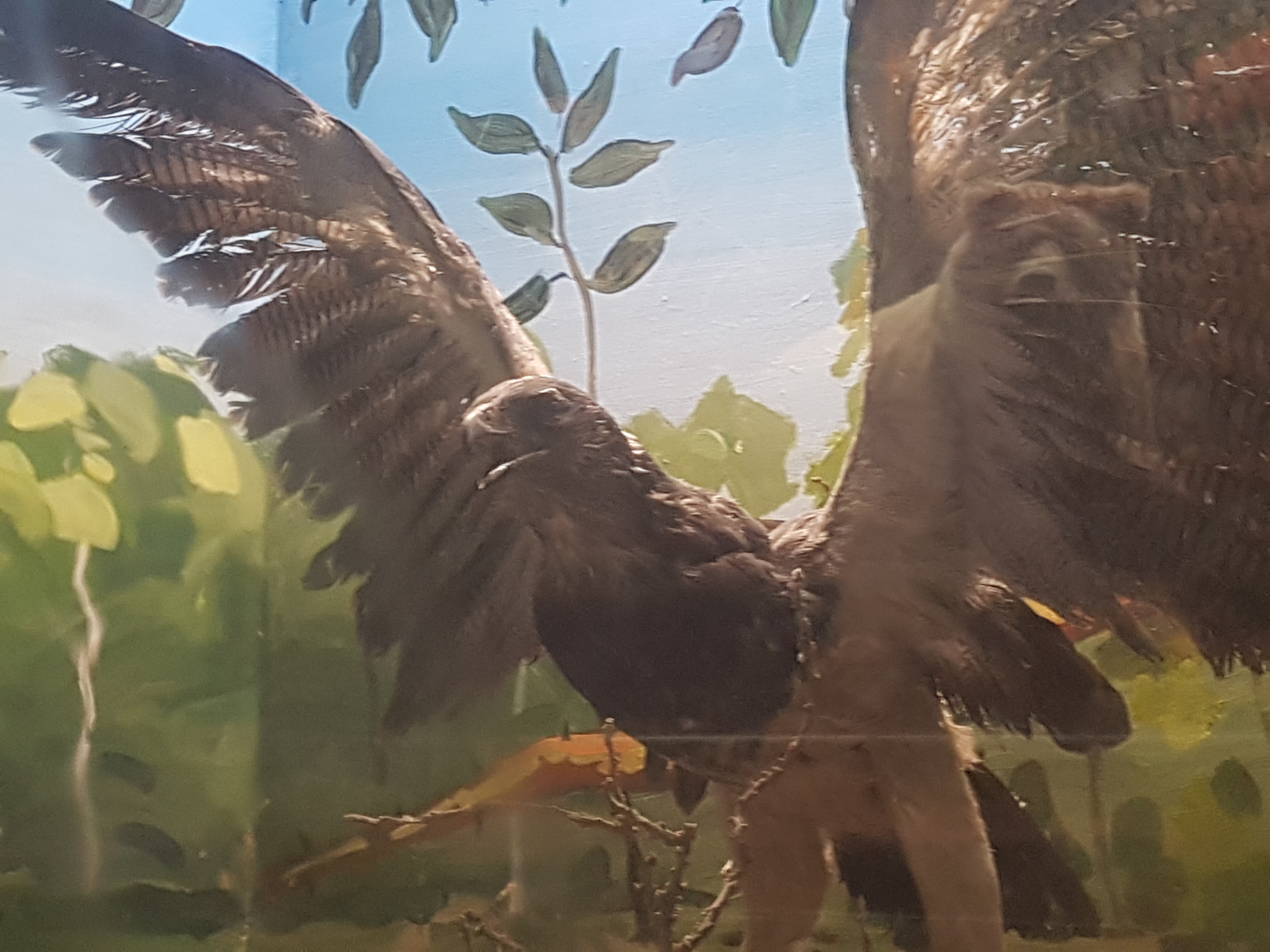
Harpy Eagle from the Kalinowski meuseum

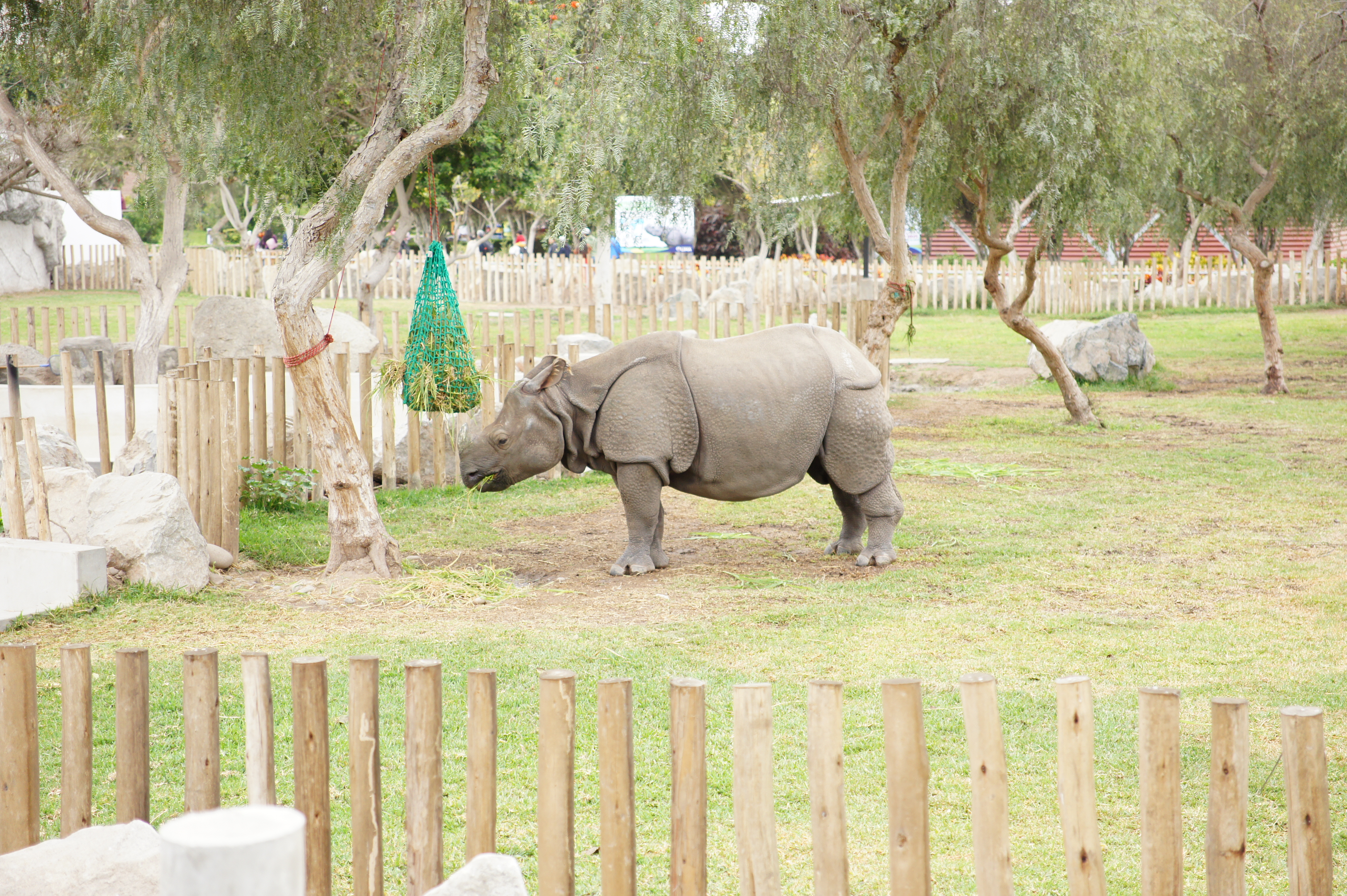
Indian Rhinoceros

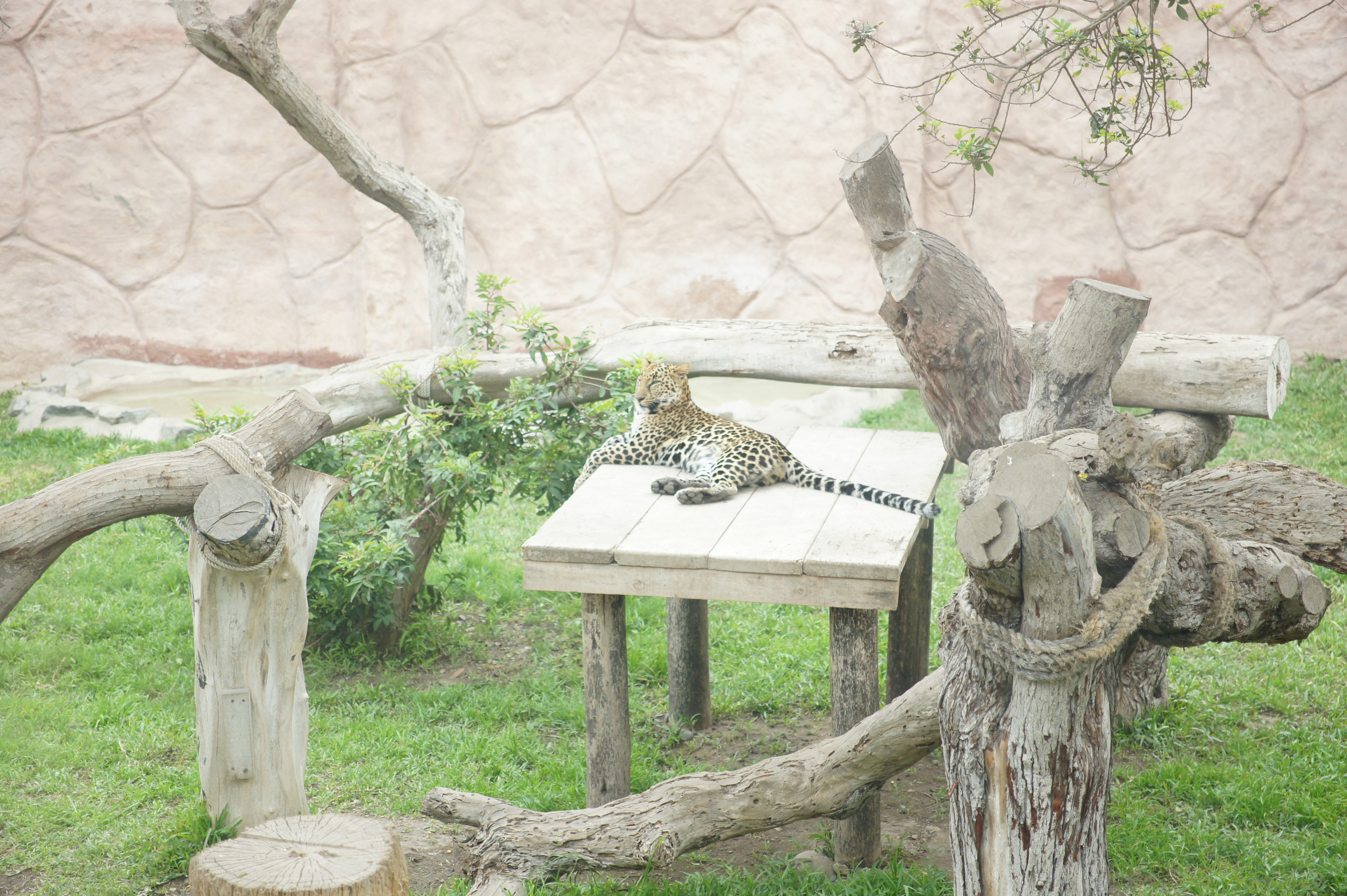
African Leopard in the Felinary

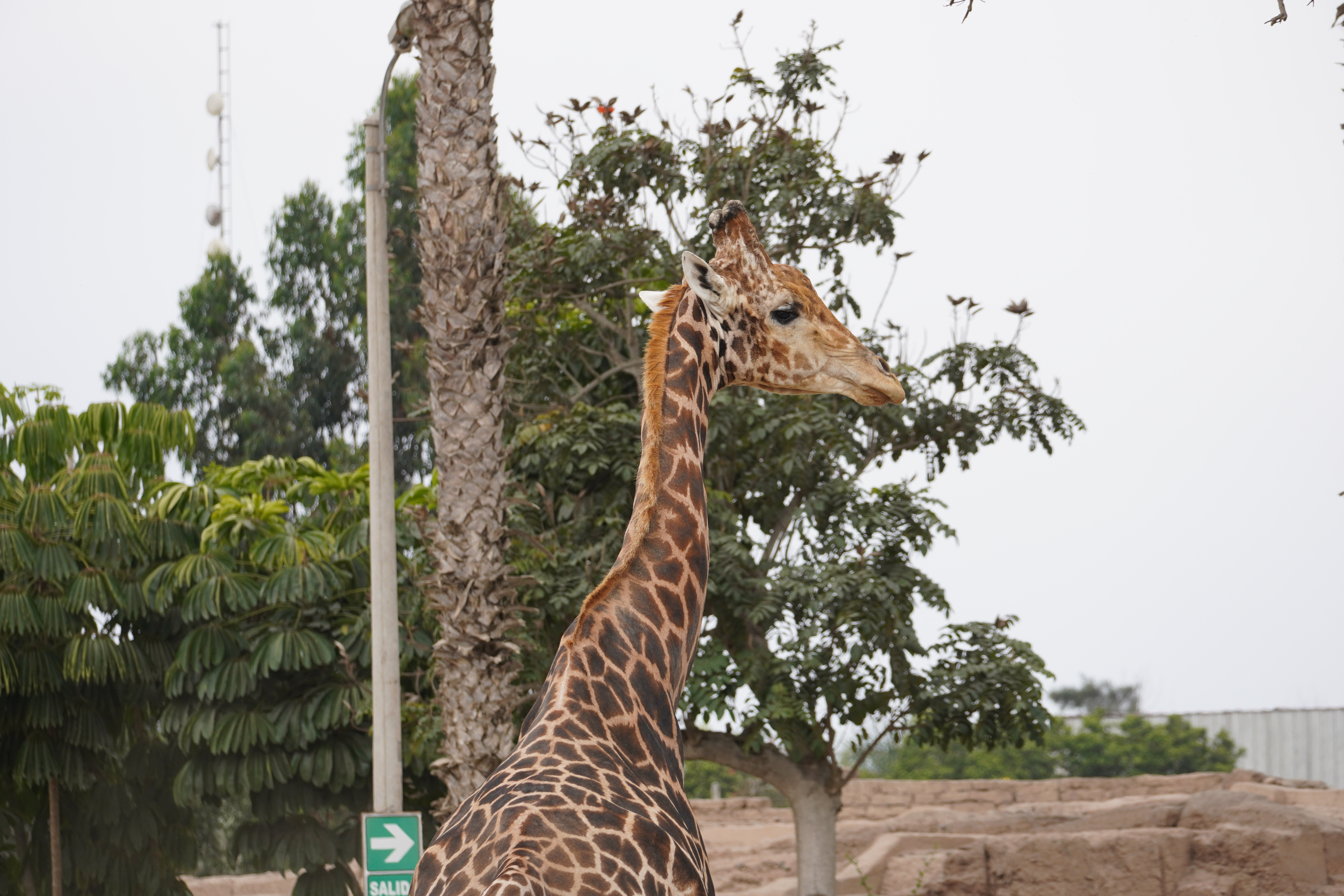
Domingo (Sunday in English) a Rothschild's Giraffe

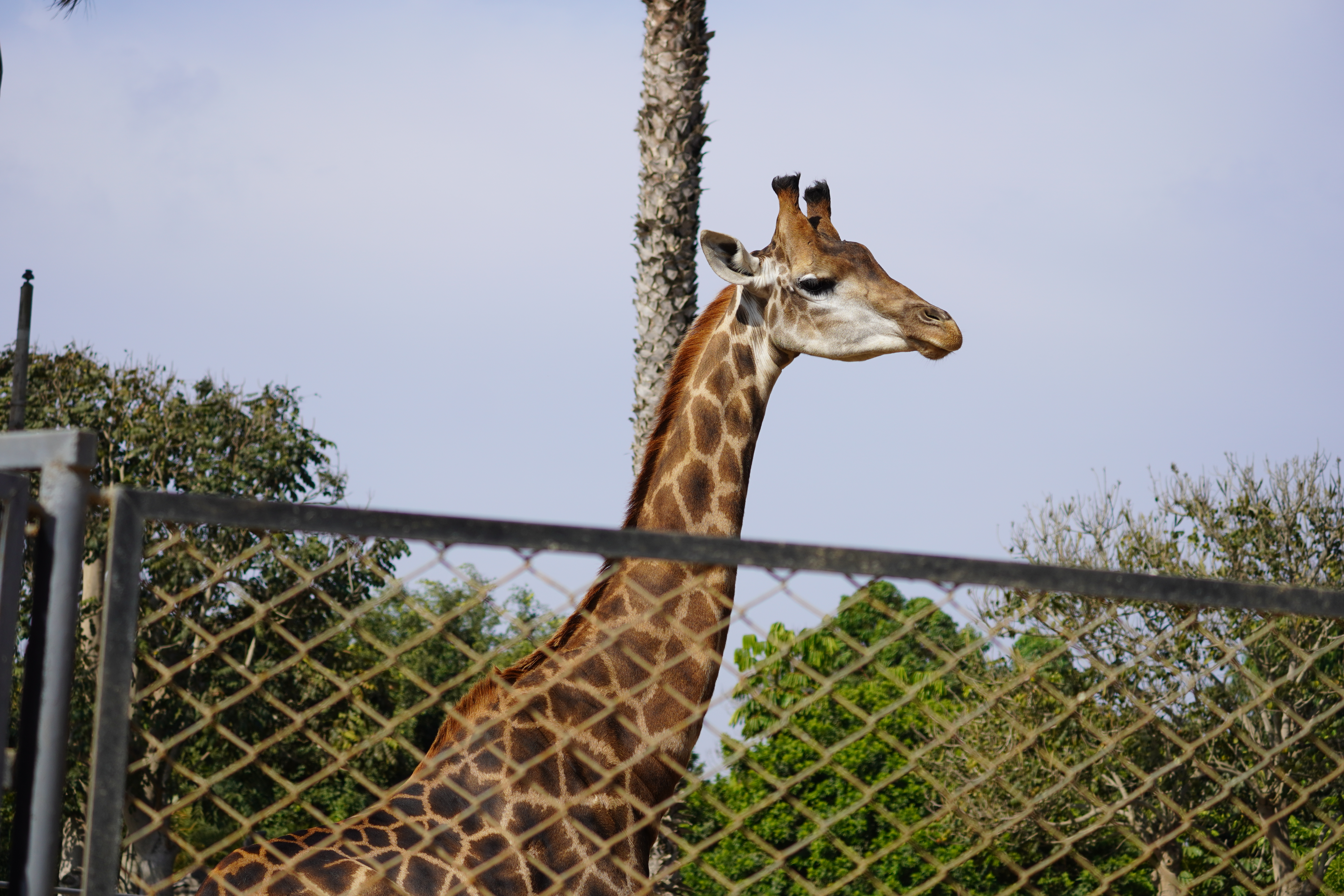
Melman, a nominate Rothschild's giraffe

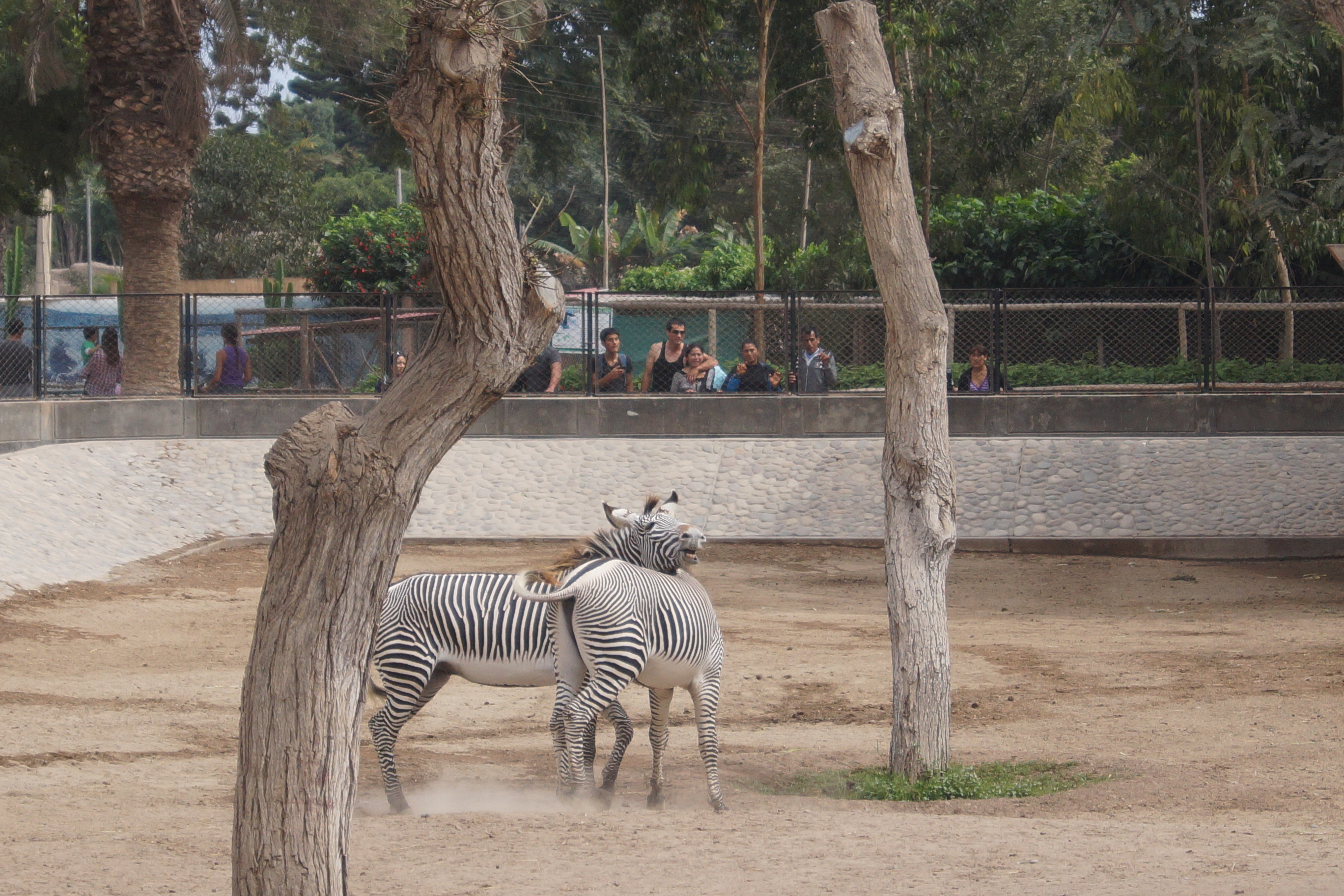
Grévy's zebra

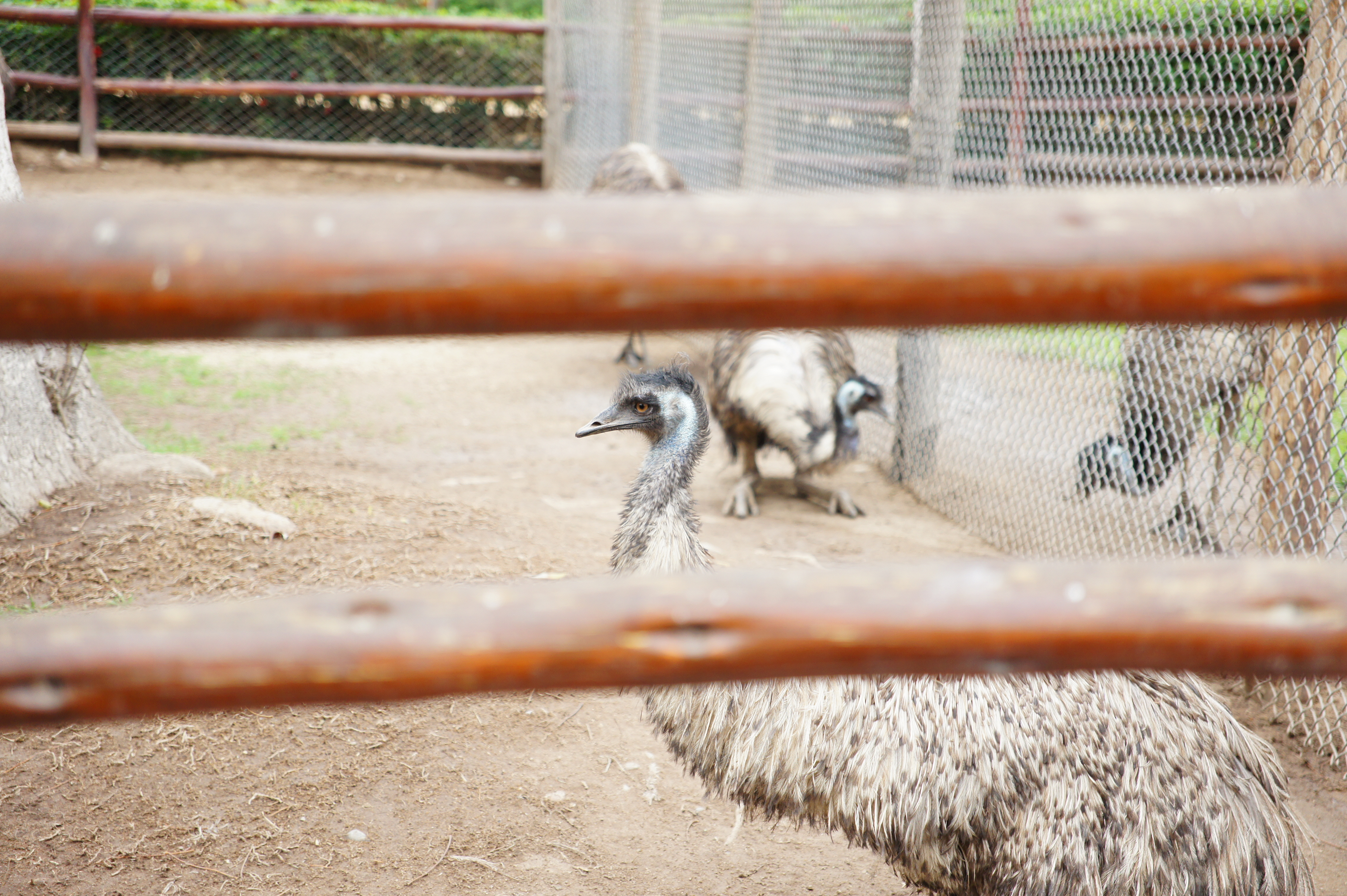
Emu

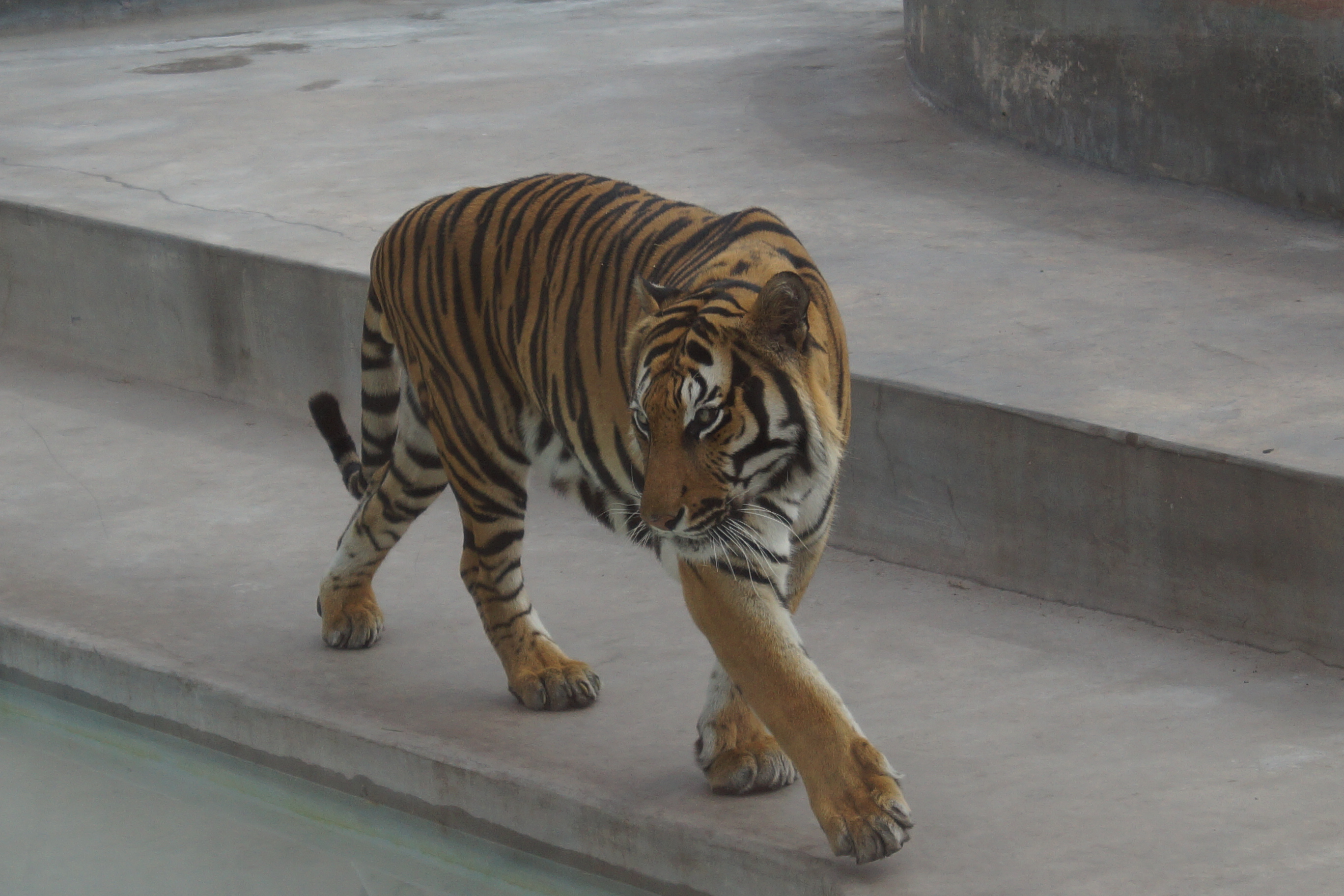
Bengal Tiger

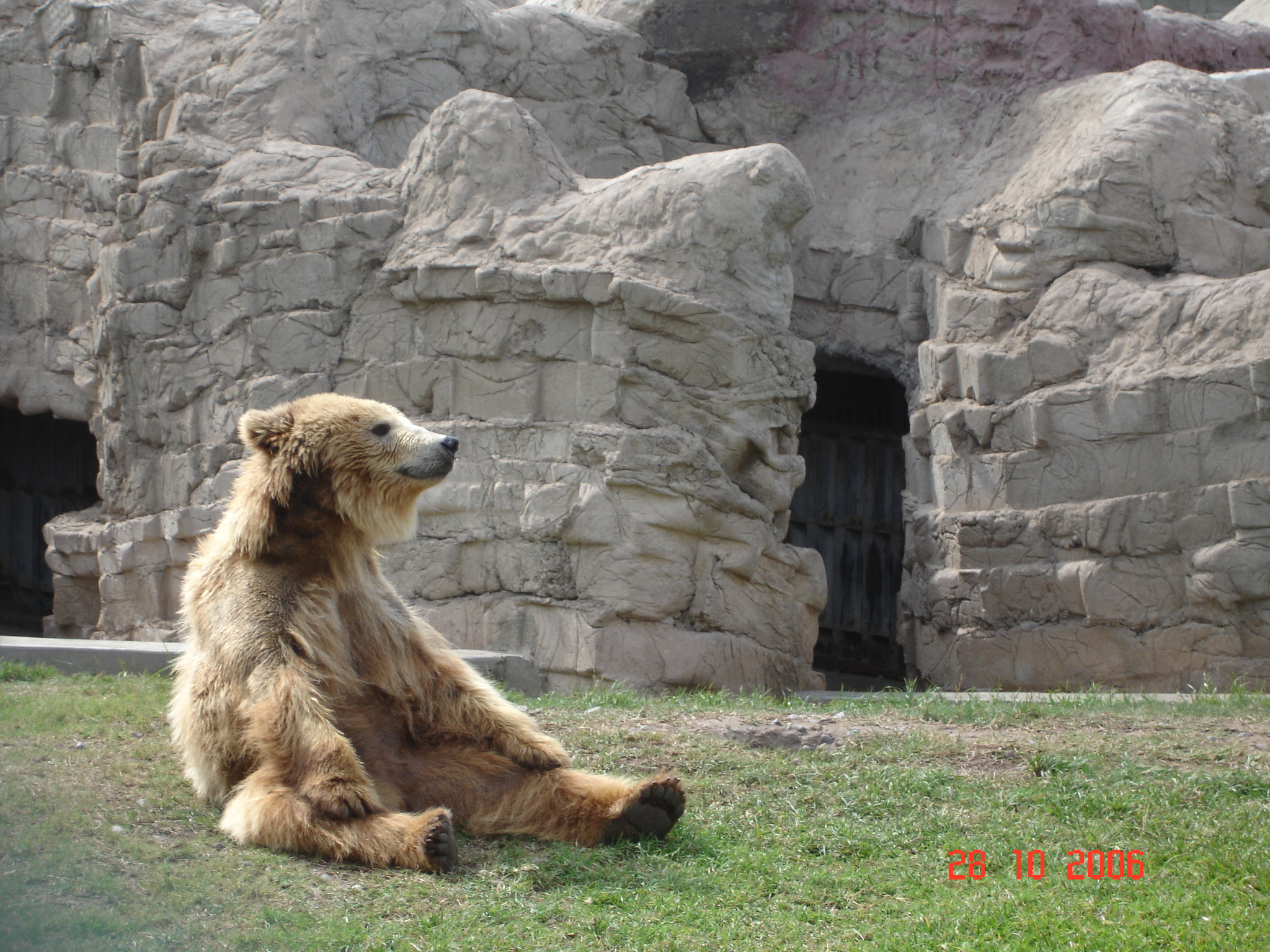
The now deceased Eurasian Brown Bear

=== Botanical garden ===
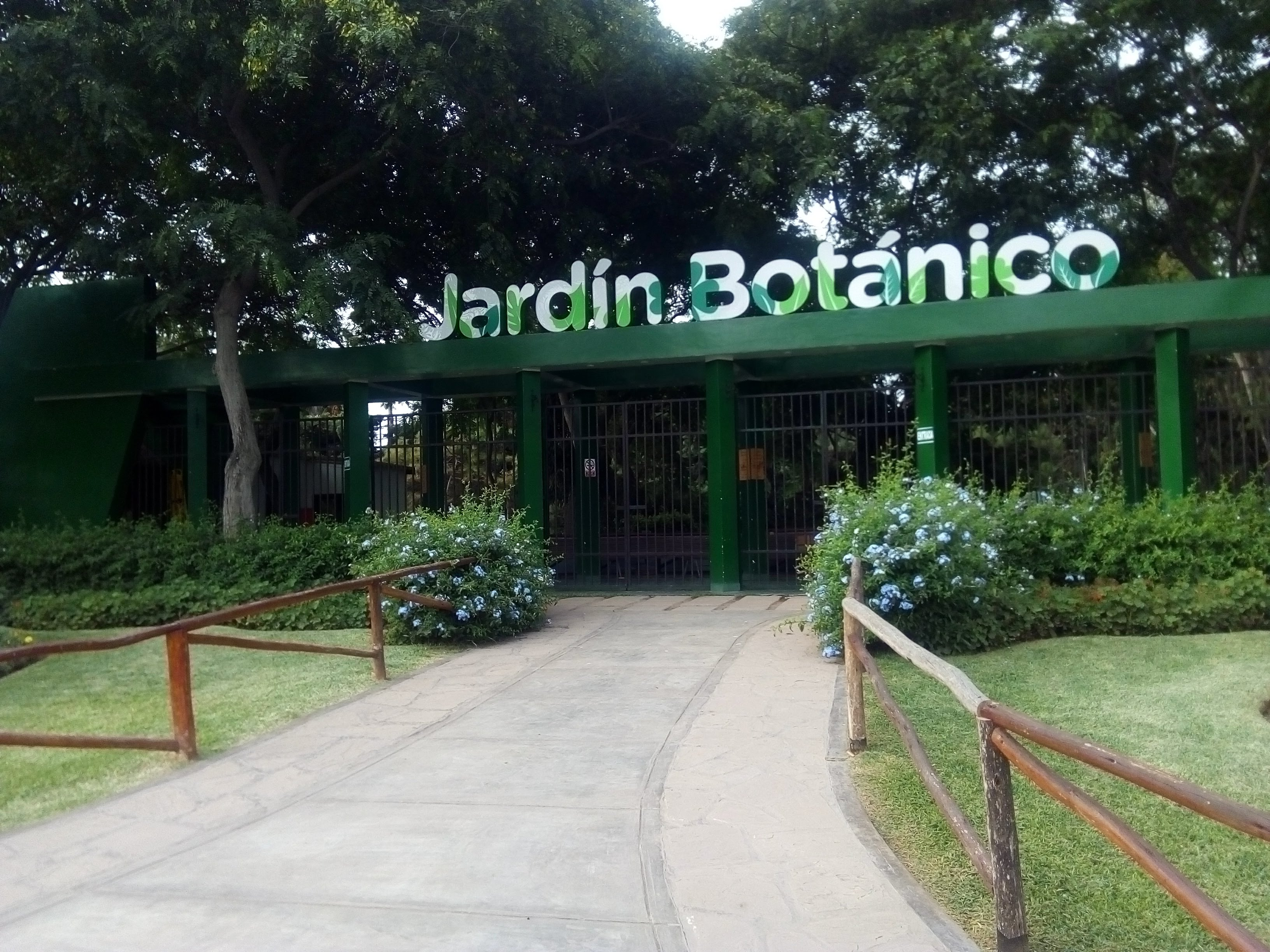
Entrance of the Botanical garden

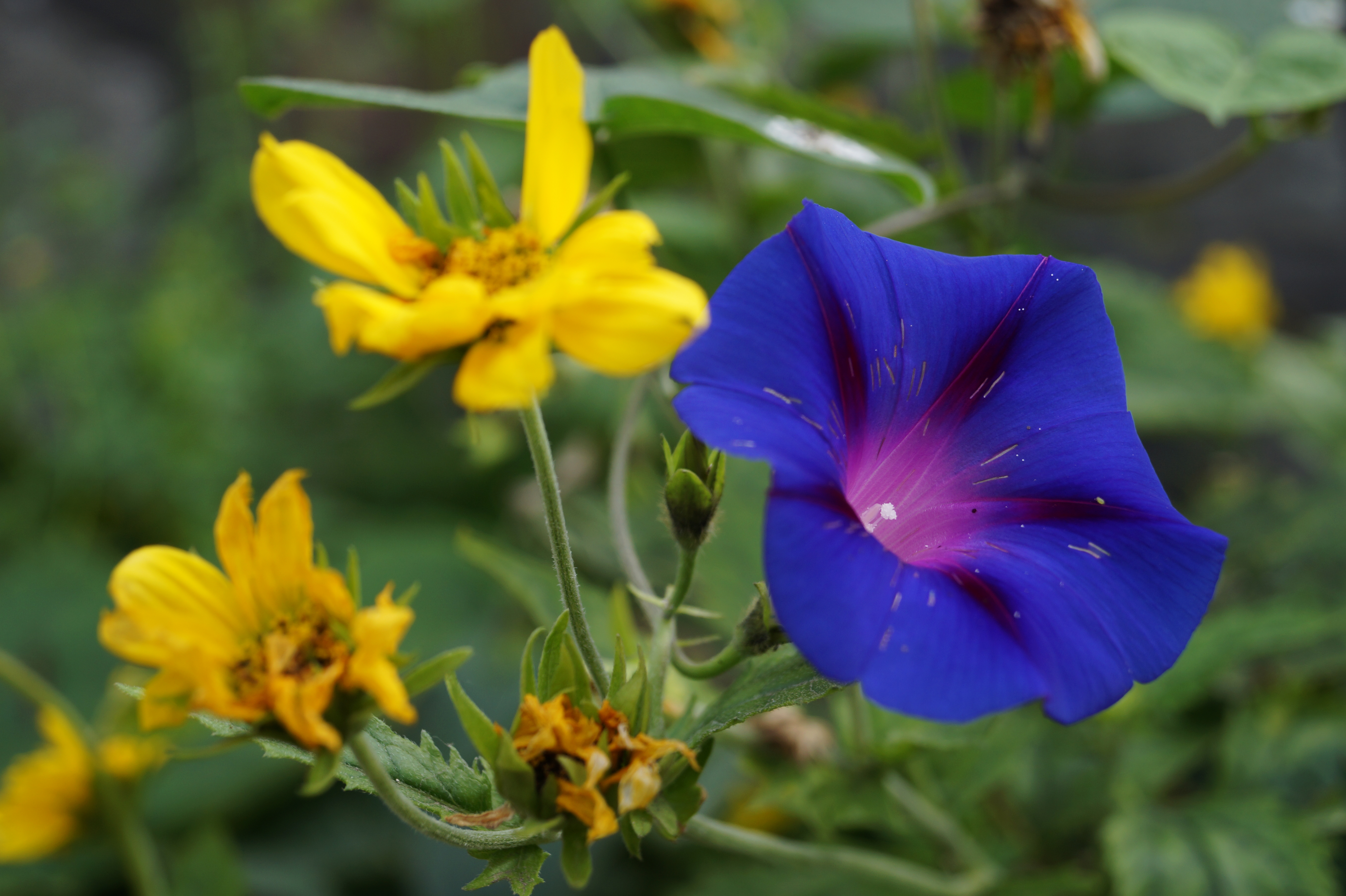
Japanese morning glory

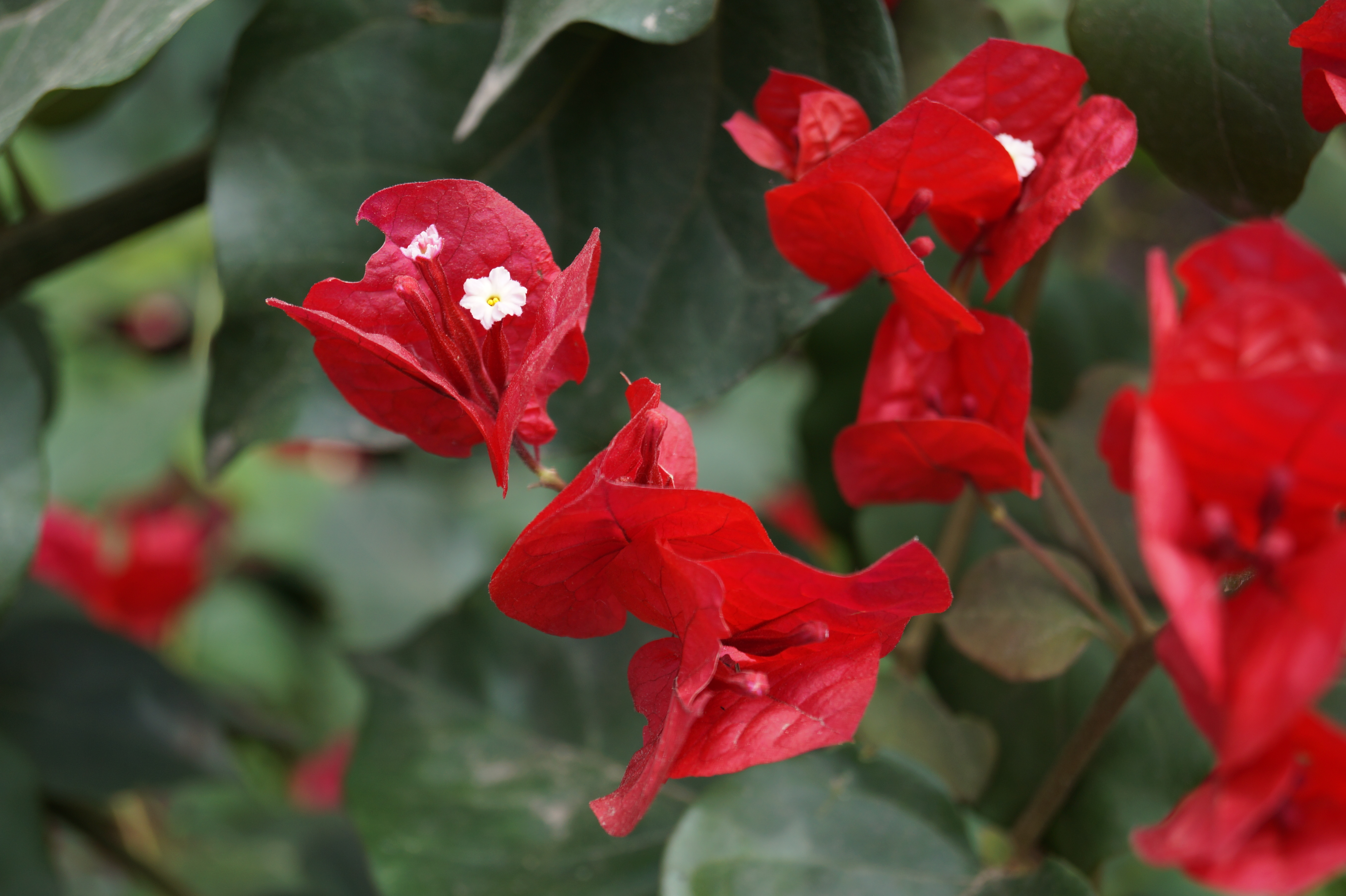
Great bougainvillea

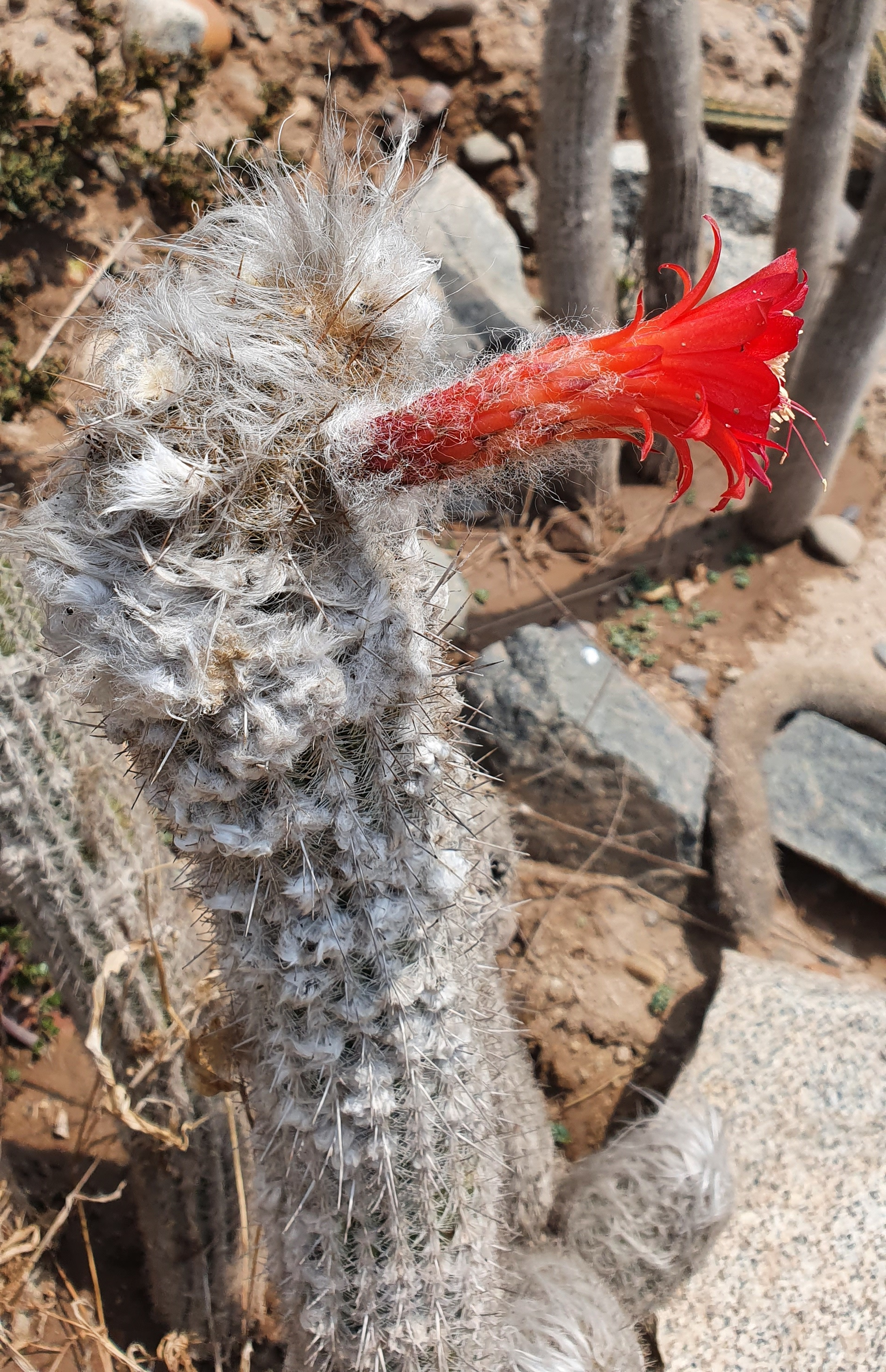
Loxanthocrereus hoffmannii

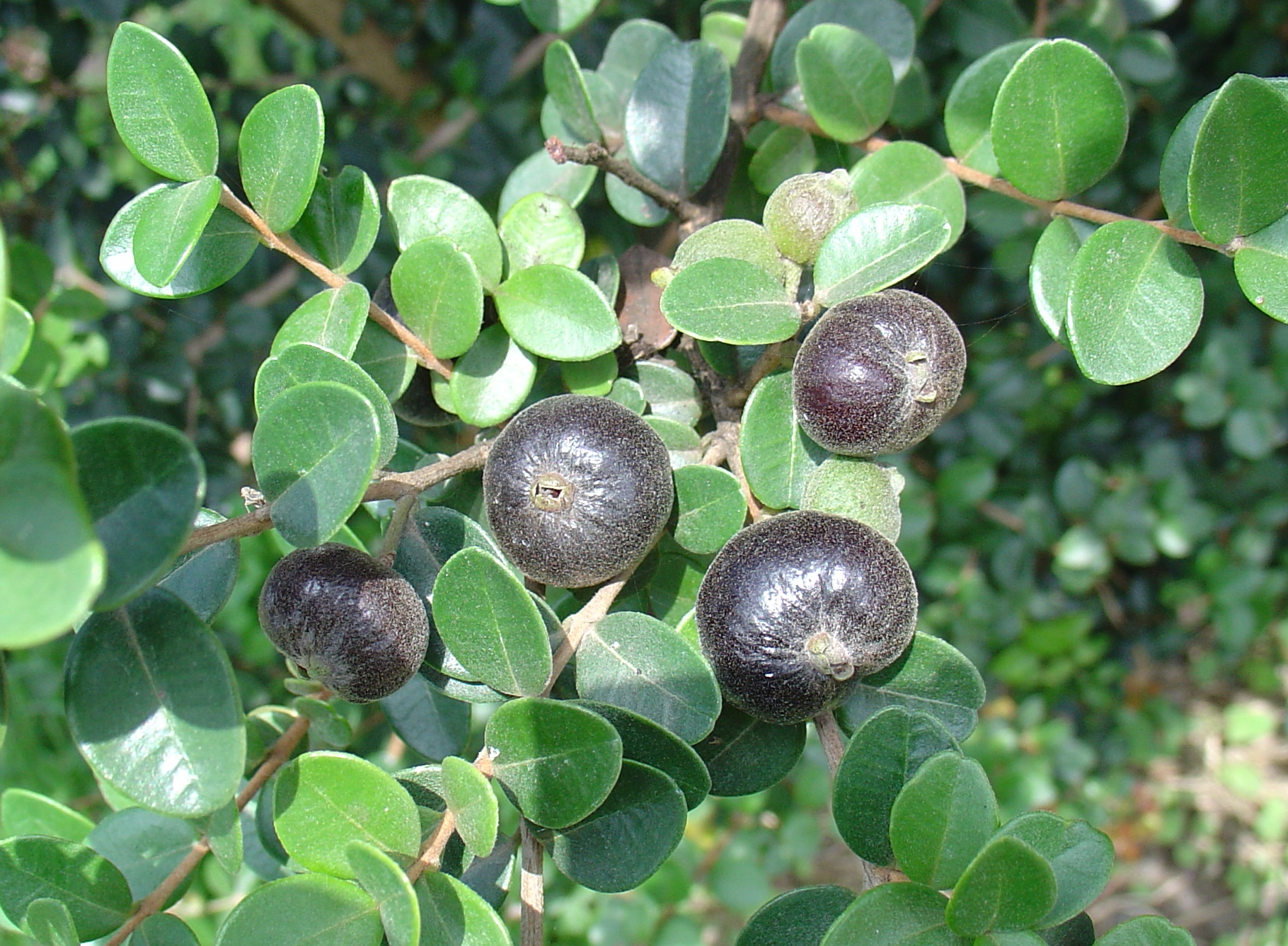
Fruits of the Myrcianthes ferreyrae

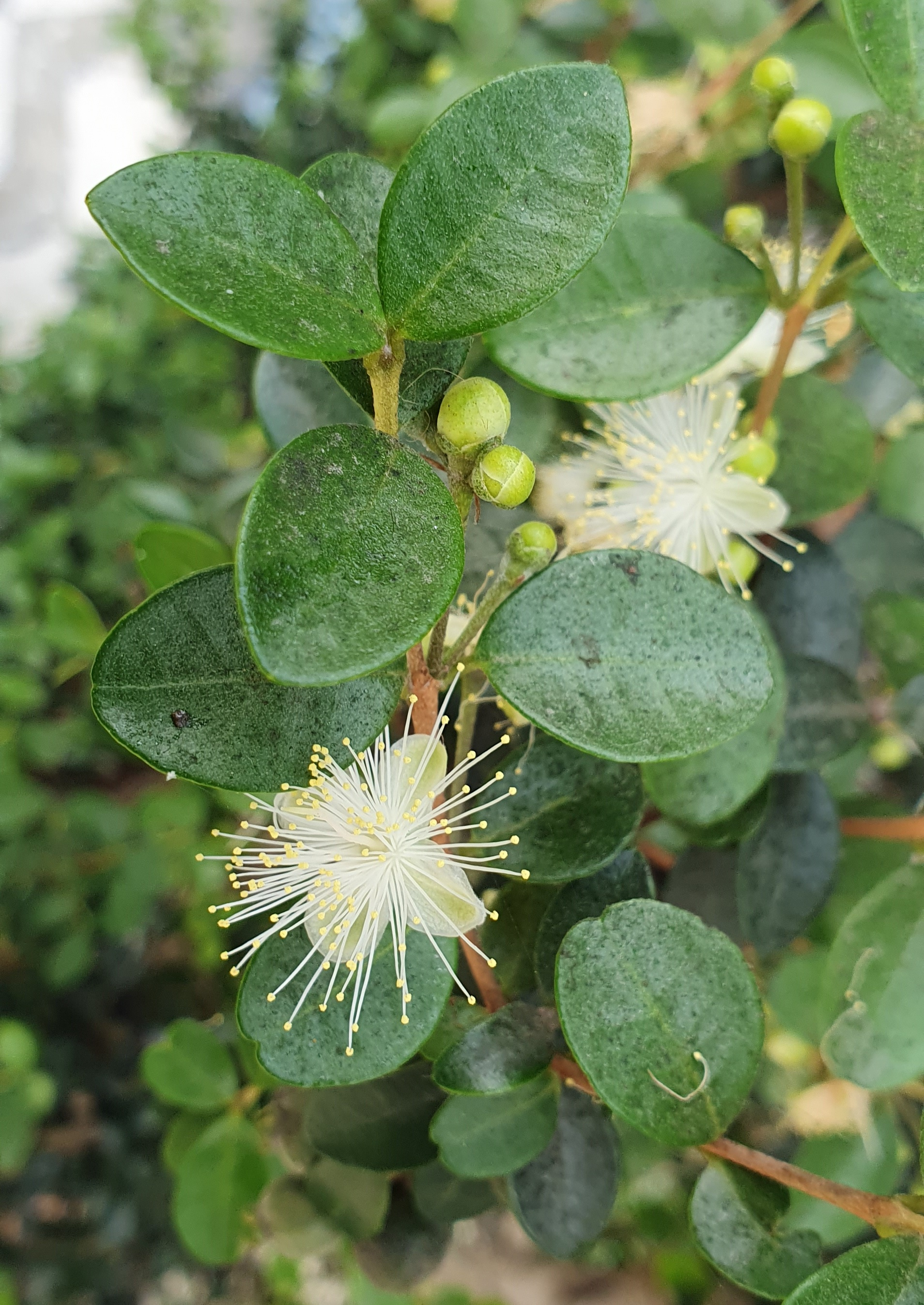
Flowers of the Myrcianthes ferreyrae

== Huachipa site ==
Huachipa Zoo
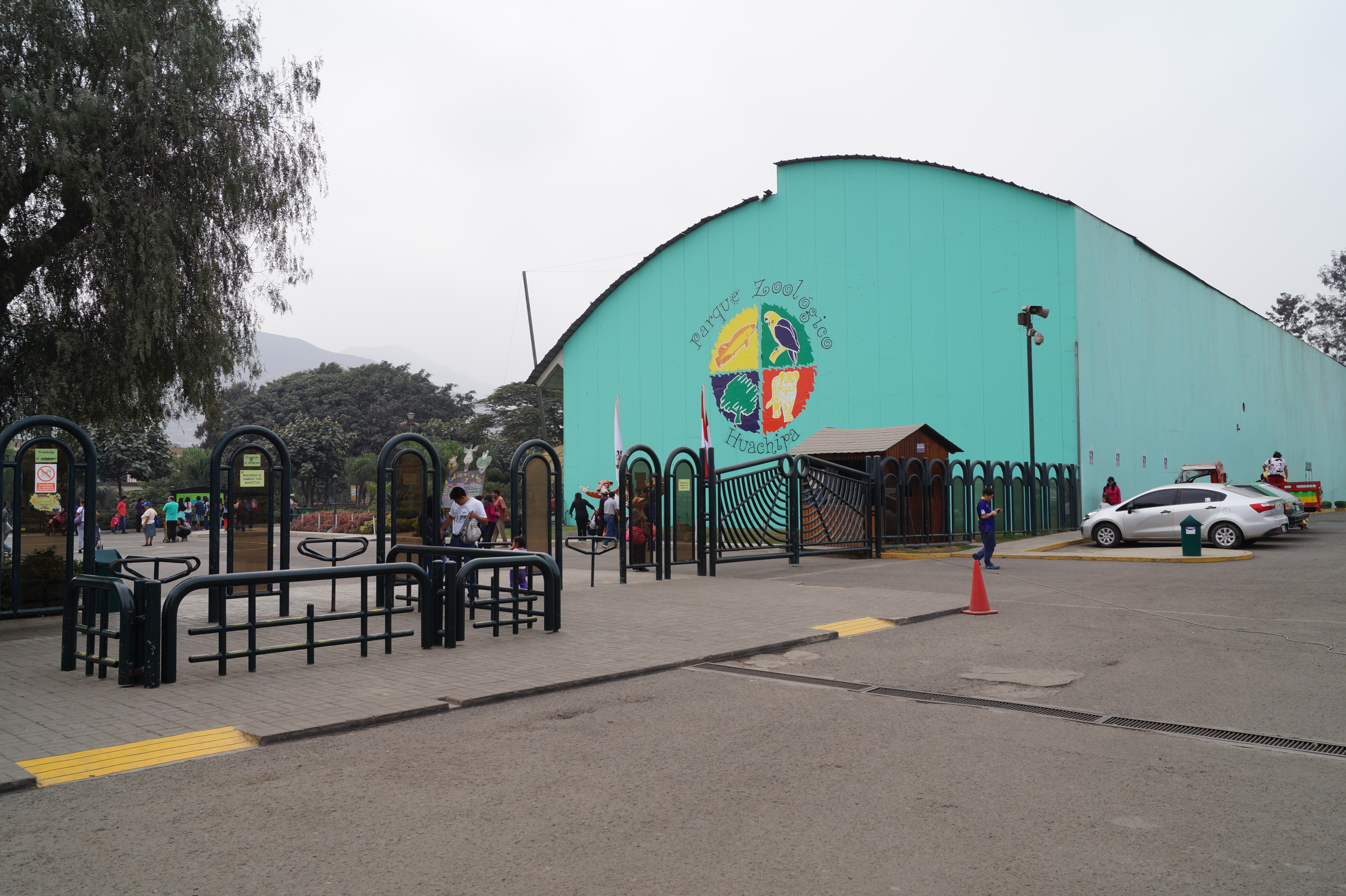
- The zoo's entrance in 2014
- Interactive map of Huachipa Zoo
- Date opened: February 22, 1999
- Location: Huachipa, Lima, Peru
- Land area: 112,000 m^{2} (1,210,000 sq ft)
- Website: http://leyendas.gob.pe/

Huachipa Recreational Ecological Centre (Spanish: Centro Ecológico Recreacional Huachipa), commonly known simply as Huachipa Zoo (Spanish: Zoológico de Huachipa), has functioned as the branch in Ate District of the park since its acquisition by its board of trustees in 2023. In 2020, it reportedly had over 2,000 animals and a capacity of 14,000 people. In addition to its outdoor exhibits, it also features an aquarium.

=== History ===
The zoo was originally inaugurated on December 23, 1998, with its original name of CER Huachipa, and it first opened its doors to the public on February 22, 1999.

In 2015, the park—the only one in Peru affiliated with the World Association of Zoos and Aquariums at the time—was named by American television network Telemundo as one number 11 on its list of best zoos that year. Earlier on the same year, the zoo had been flooded after heavy rains affected the district.

The zoo's aquarium, the largest in the country with an area of almost 1,000 m^{2}, was inaugurated on July 26, 2016.

In 2019, under the mayoralty of Edde Cuellar, the zoo was temporarily closed due to irregularities and potential hazards found during an inspection by the district's municipality.

In 2020, as a consequence of the COVID-19 pandemic in Peru, the zoo closed its doors in March, but was soon forced to reopen them to a limited public between the ages of 14 and 65 in order to be able to purchase food for the animals, which had a monthly cost of S/. 30,000 in 2015. Soon after, it started providing virtual tours using the Zoom programme for the same reason.

The park was acquired by the Board of Trustees of the Parque de las Leyendas in 2023, and has since been renamed, operating under the Metropolitan Municipality of Lima.

== Gallery ==
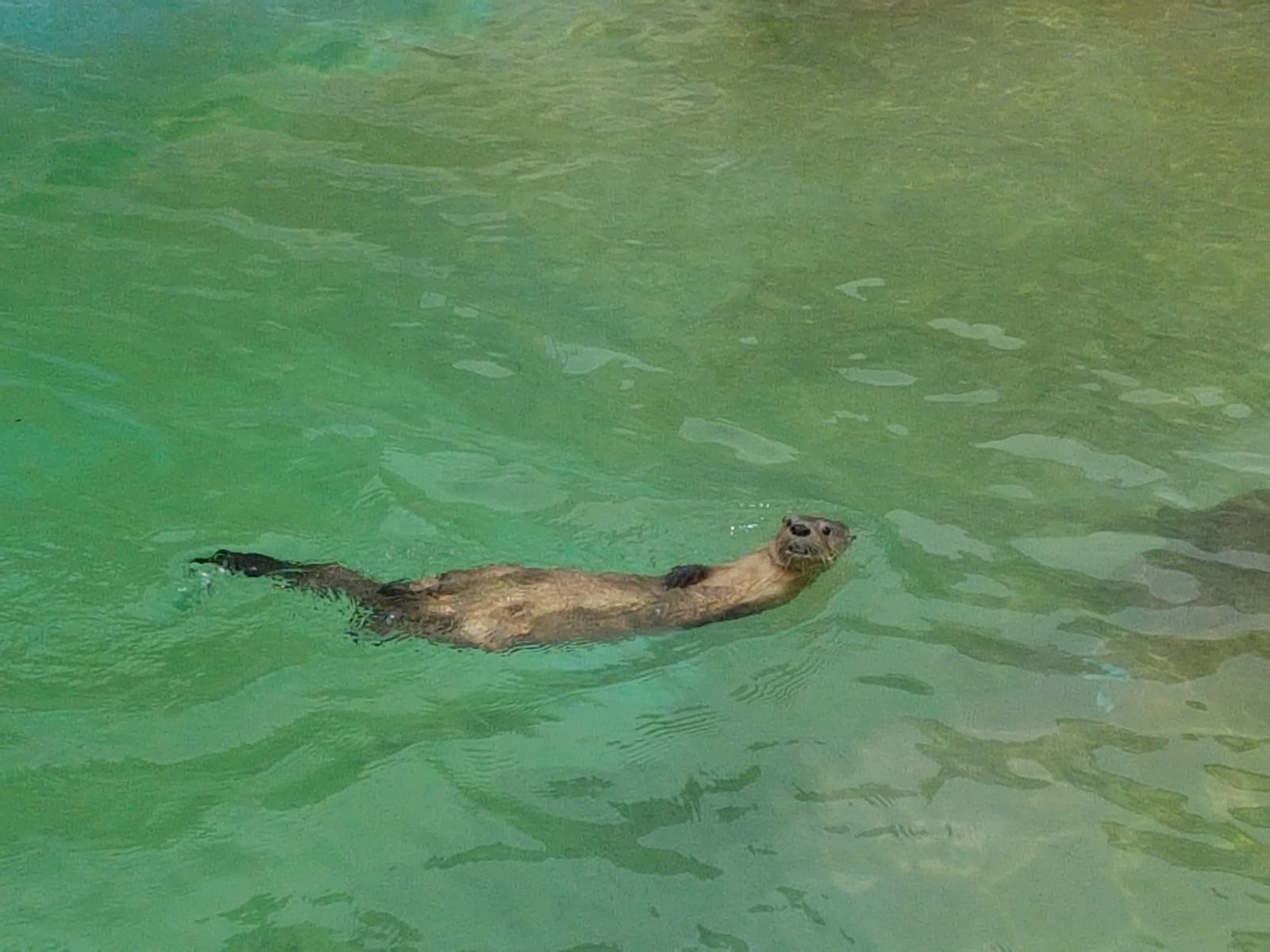
Marine otter in the Marine exhibits

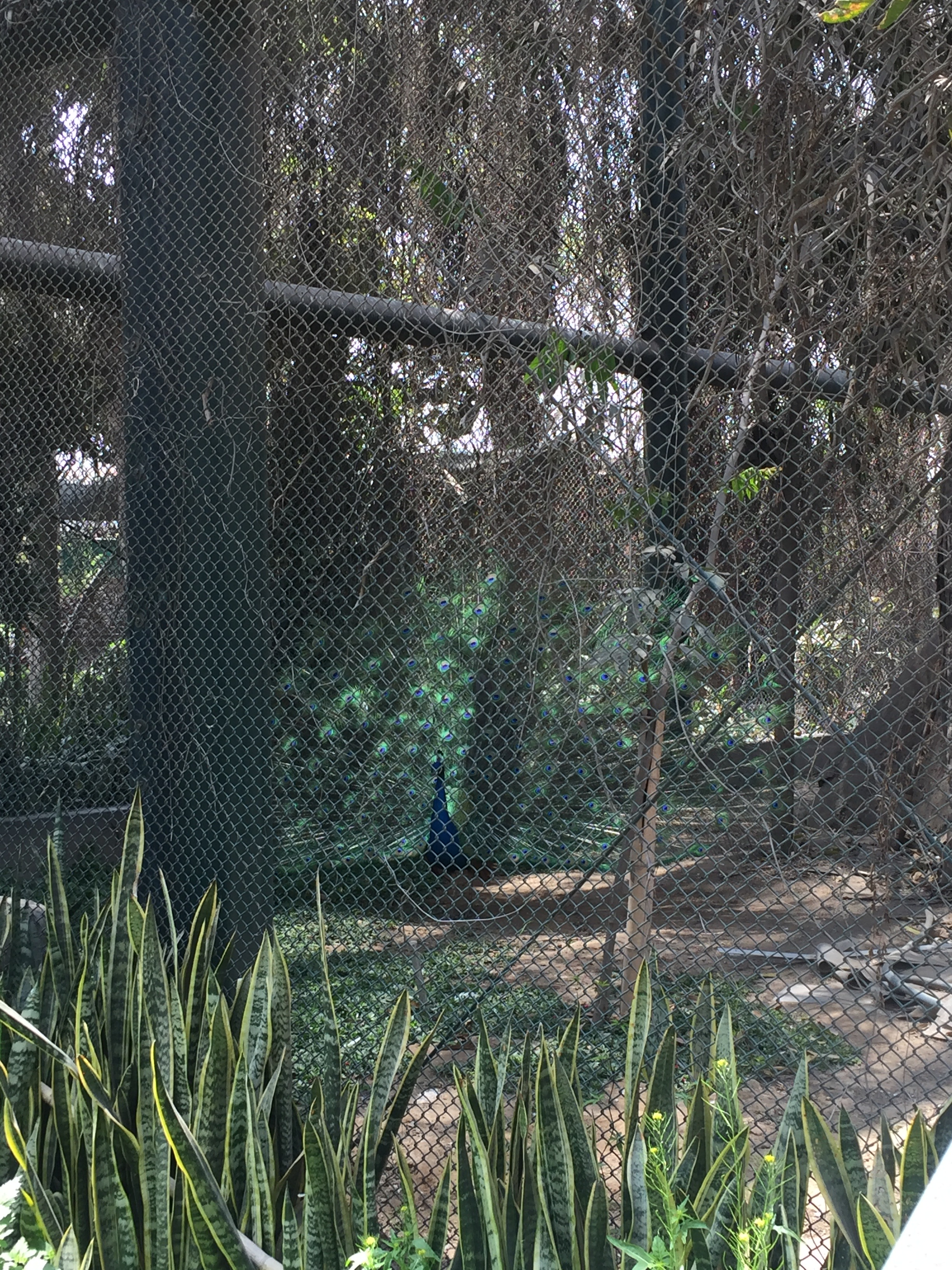
Indian peafowl at the Bird forest

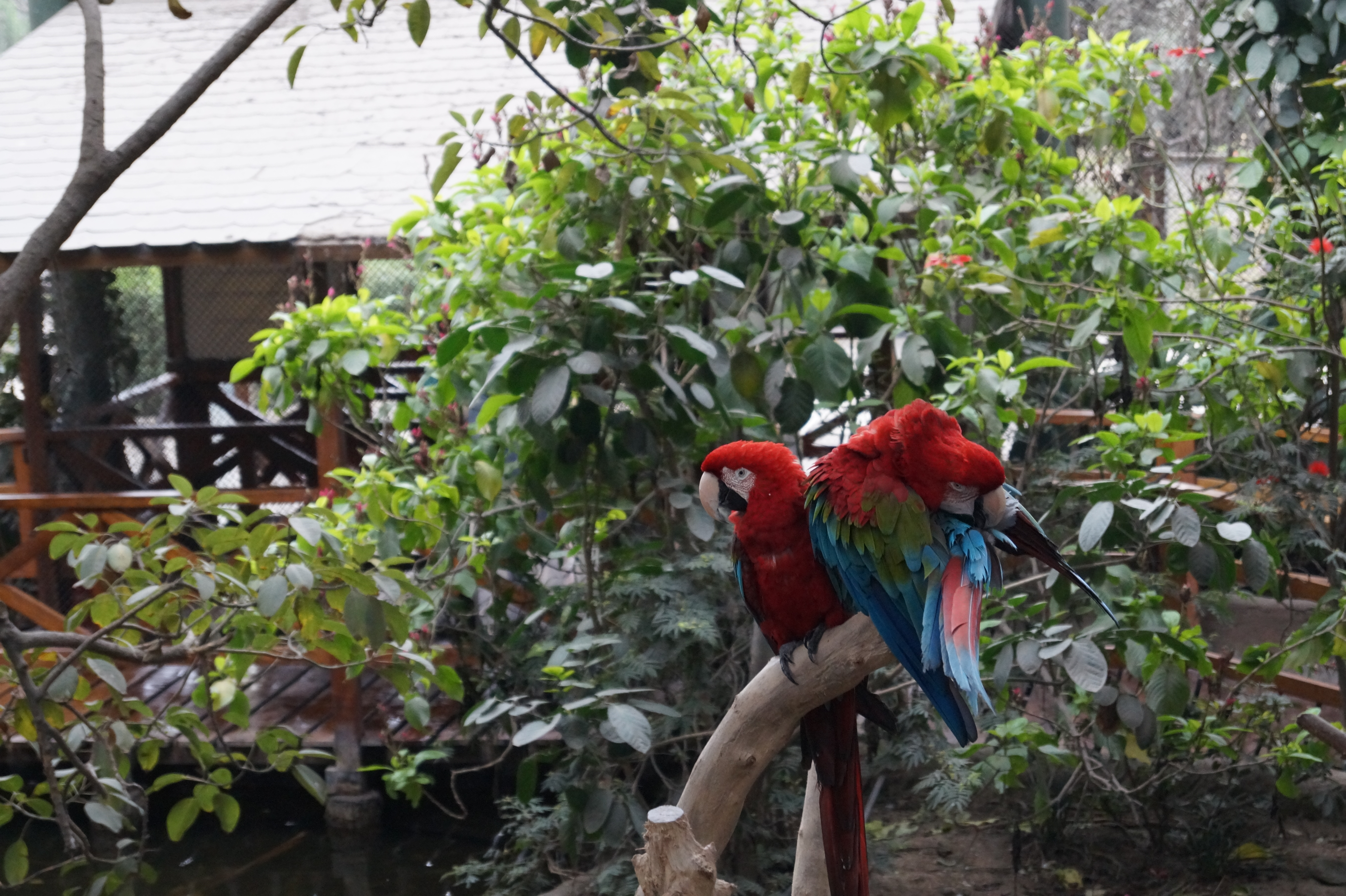
Red-and-green macaws at the Bird forest

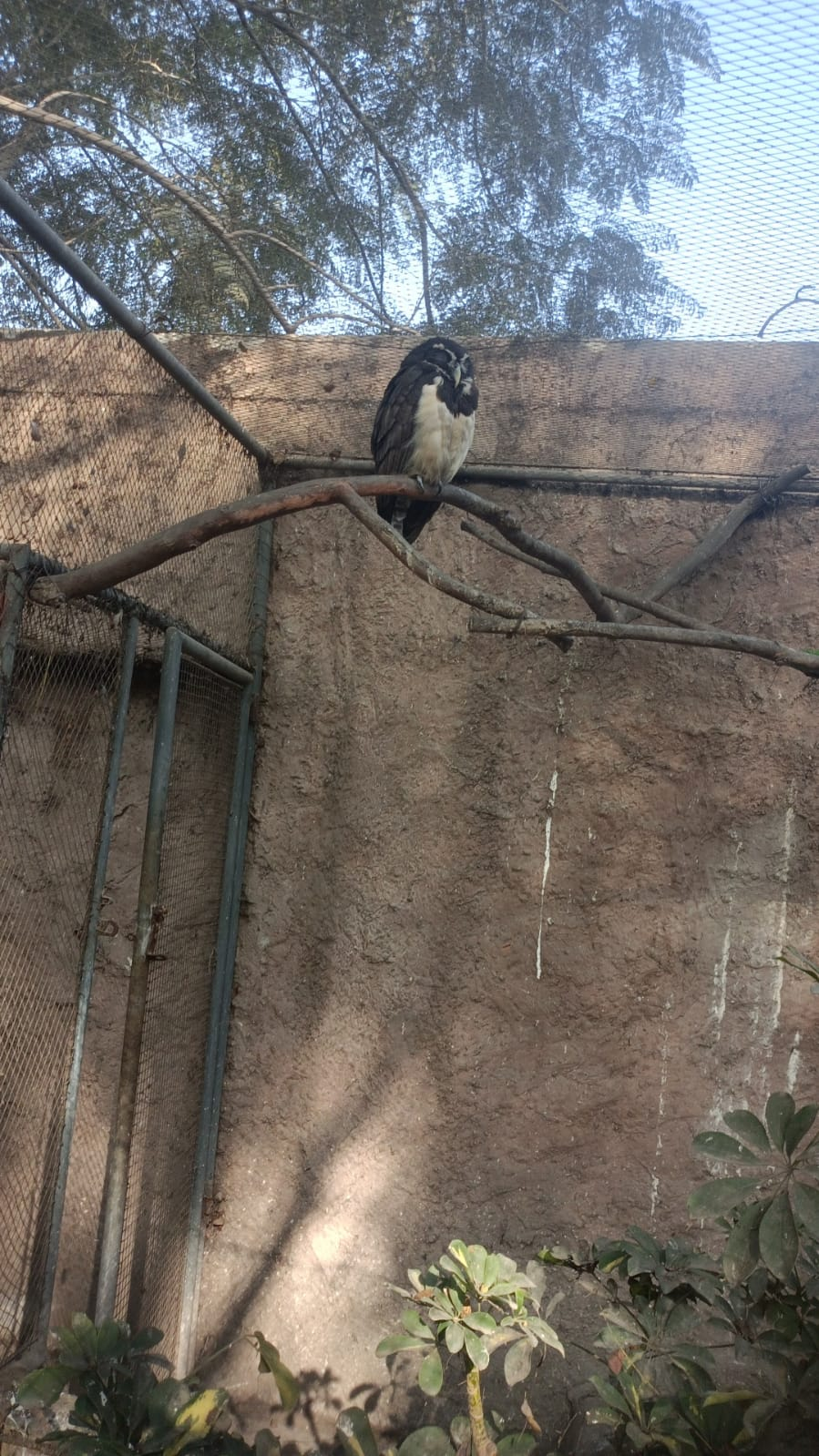
Spectacled owl

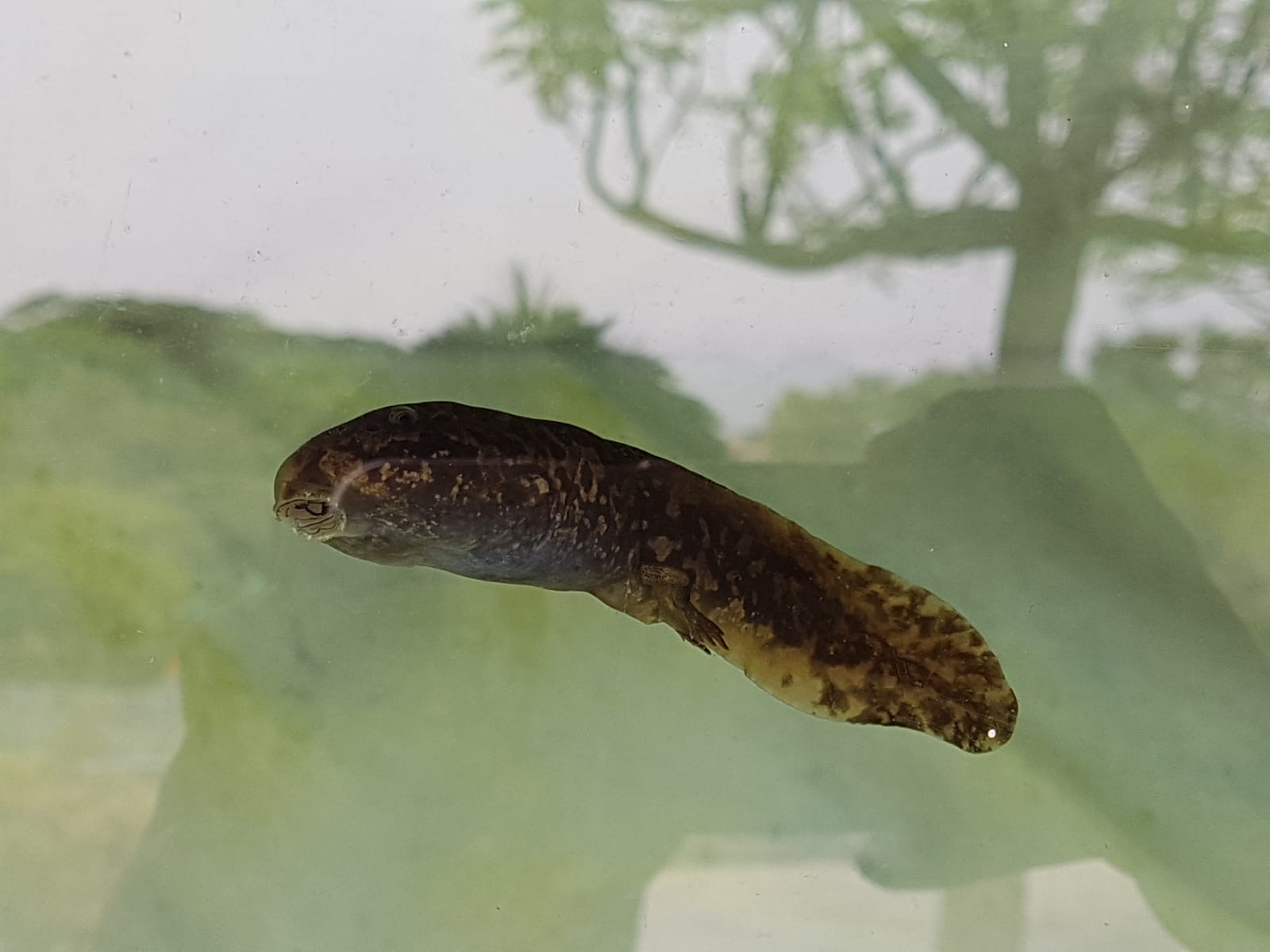
A froglet of the Titicaca frog in the Amphibians Exhibit

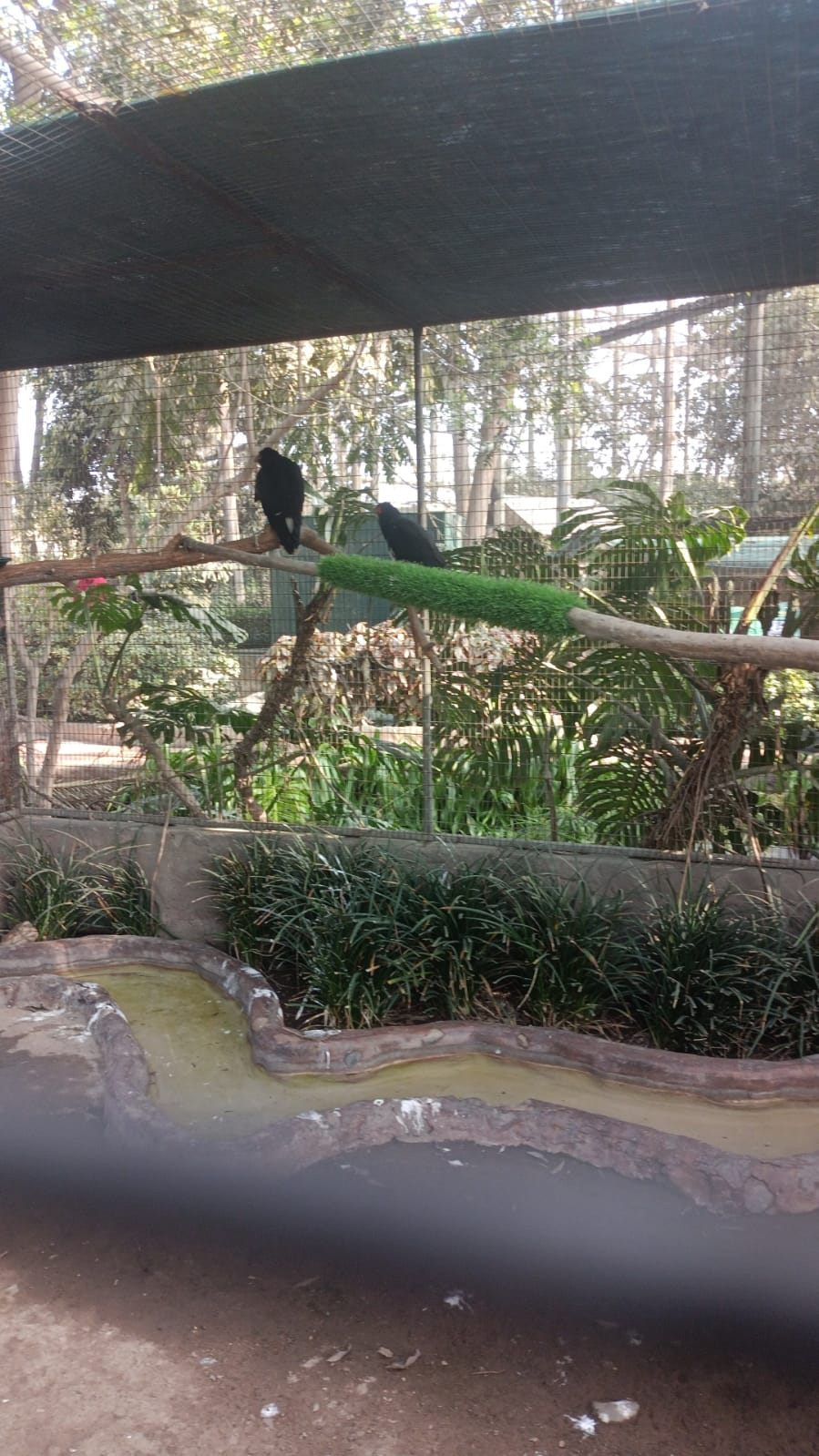
Mountain caracara

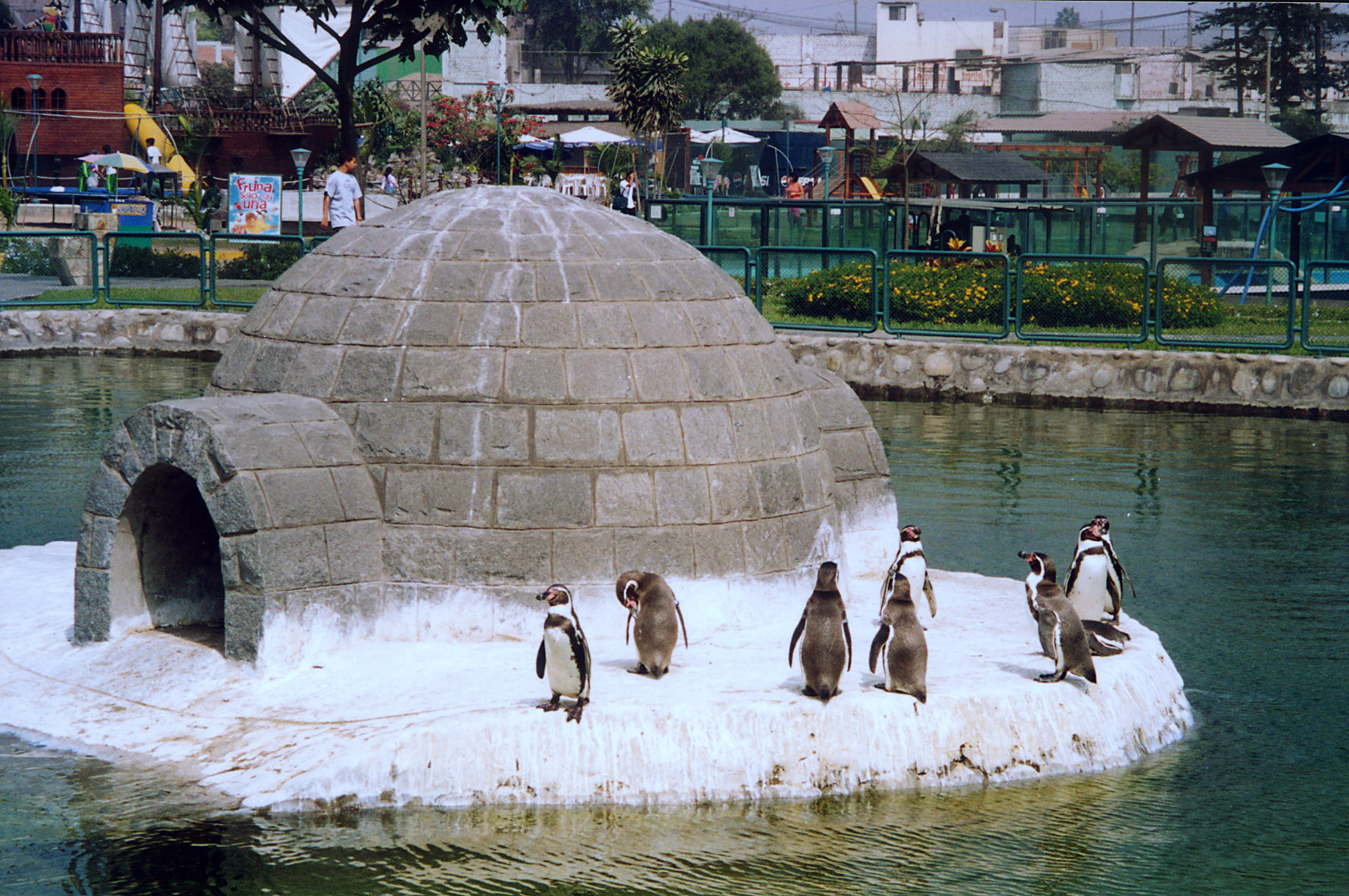
Humbolt peguins in the center of the zoo

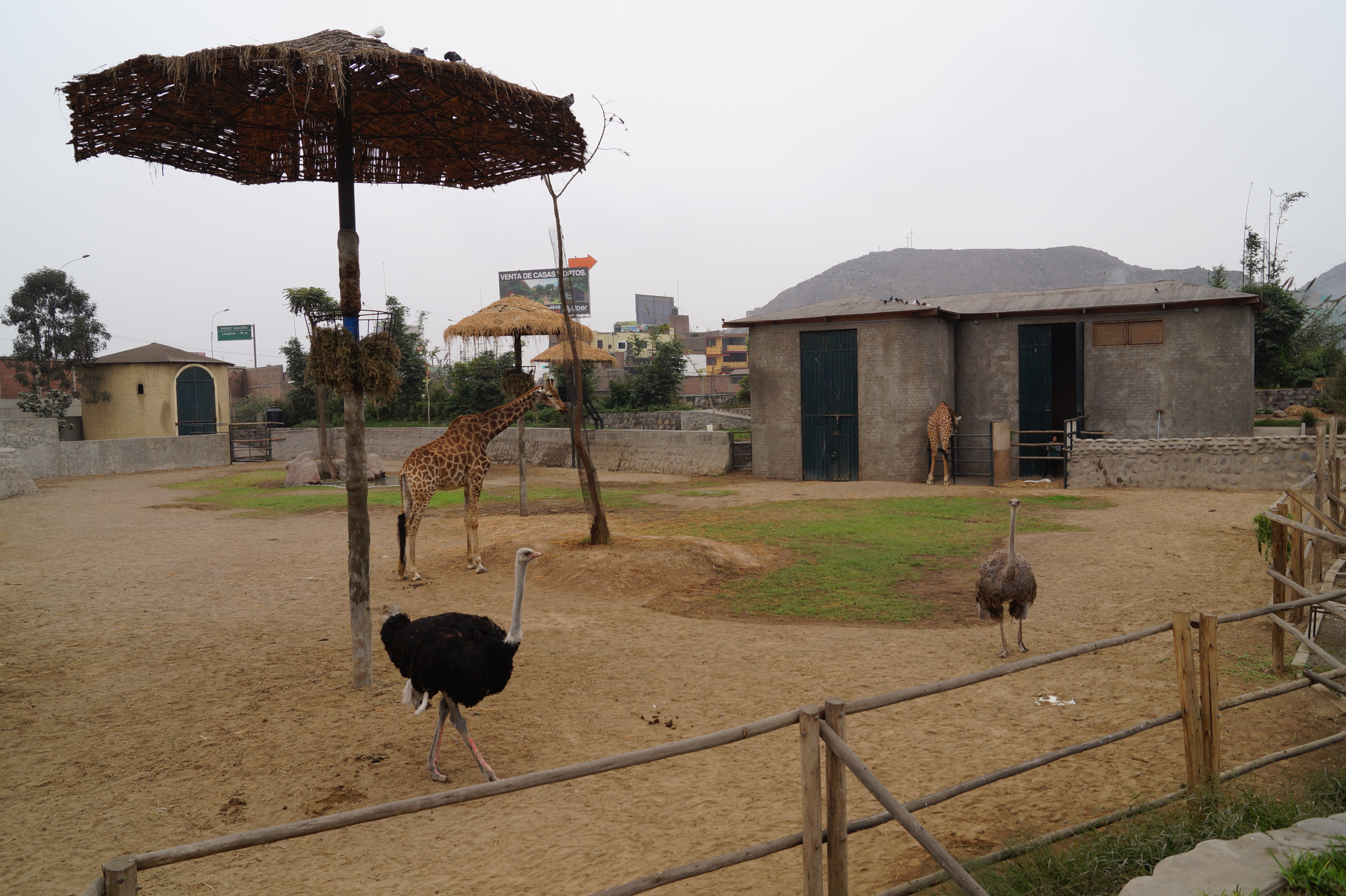
African Savannah Exhibit, with a pair of Common Ostriches and a Rothschild's giraffe

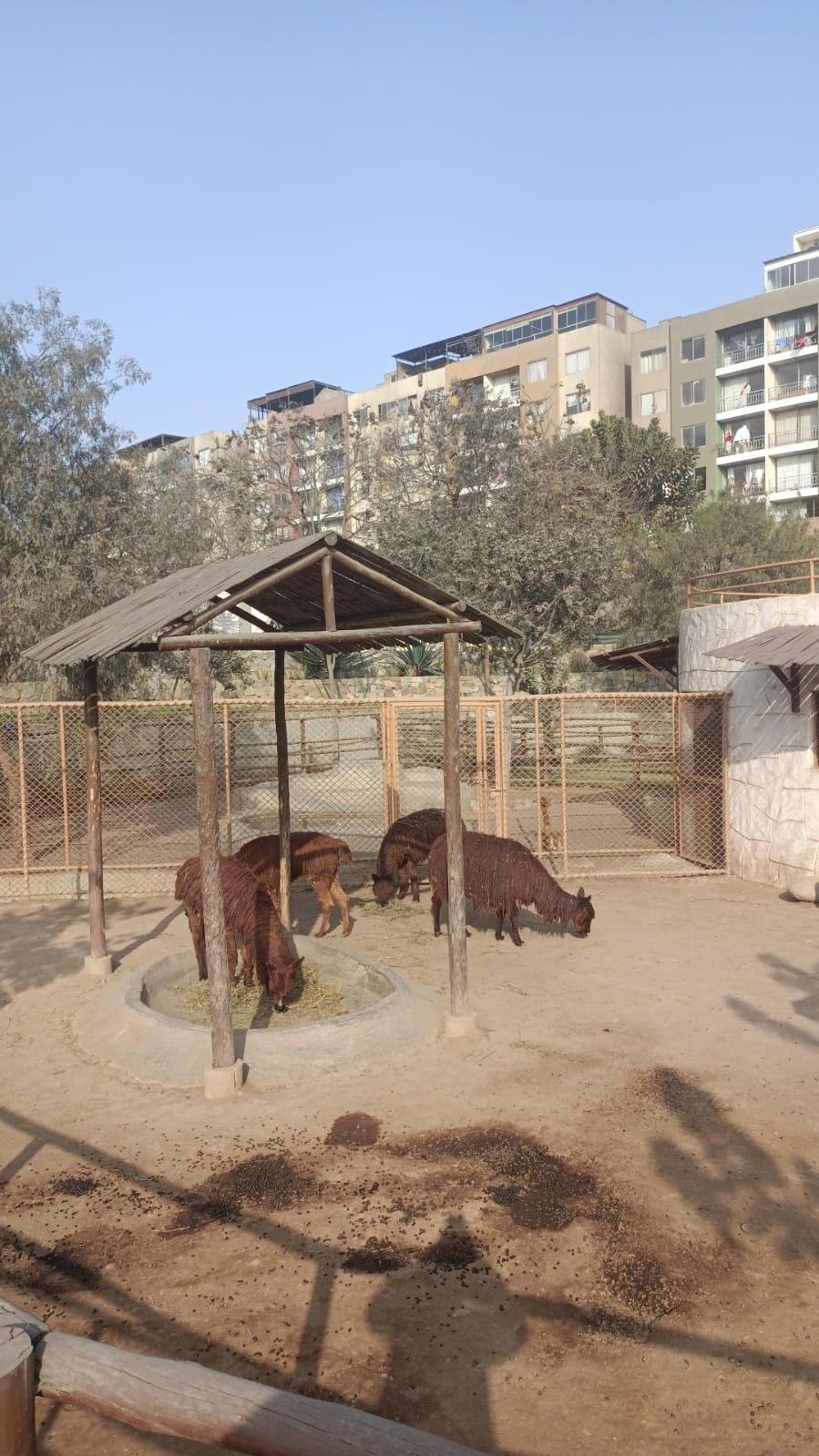
Alpaca

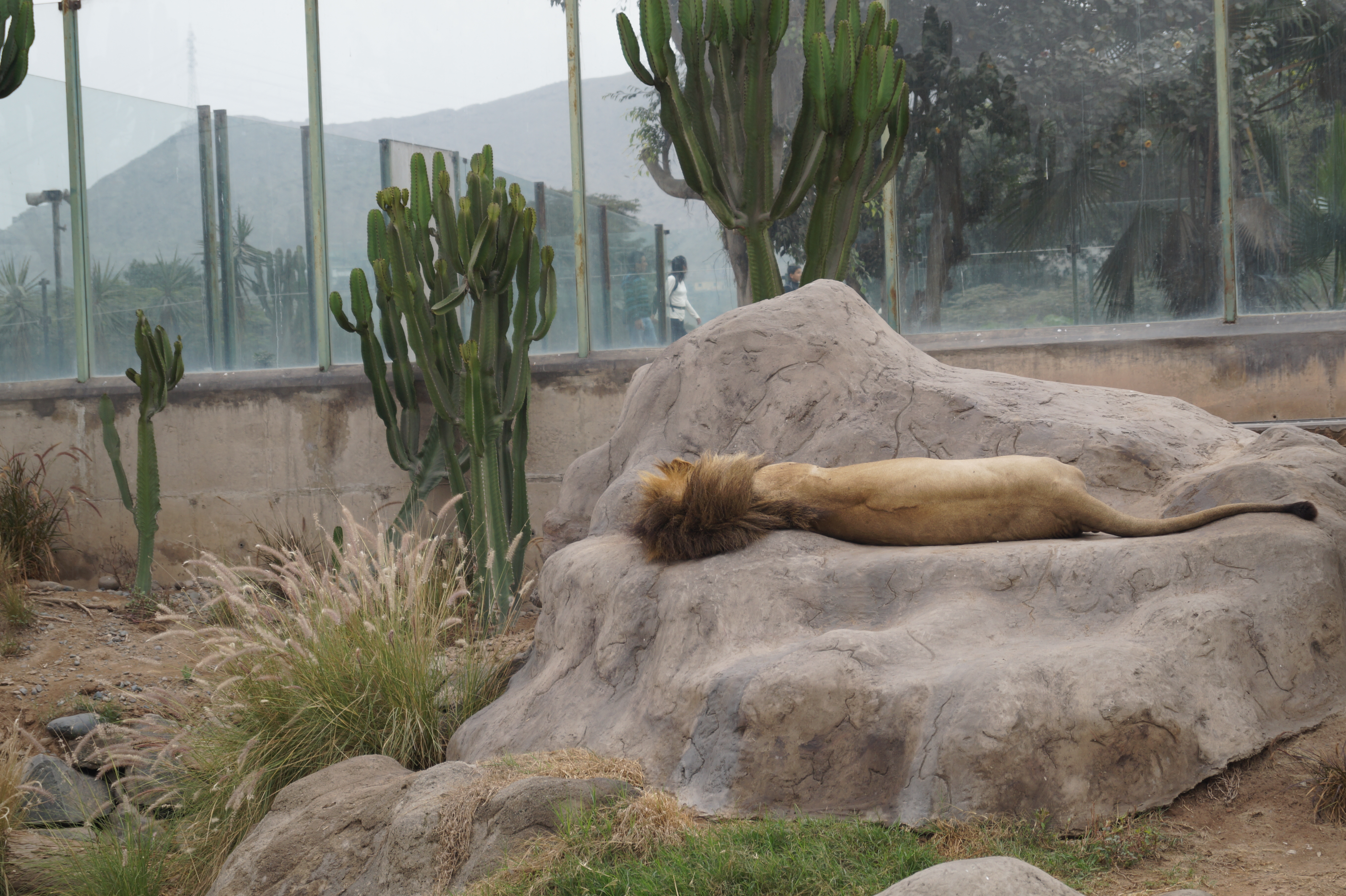
African Lion in the Felinary

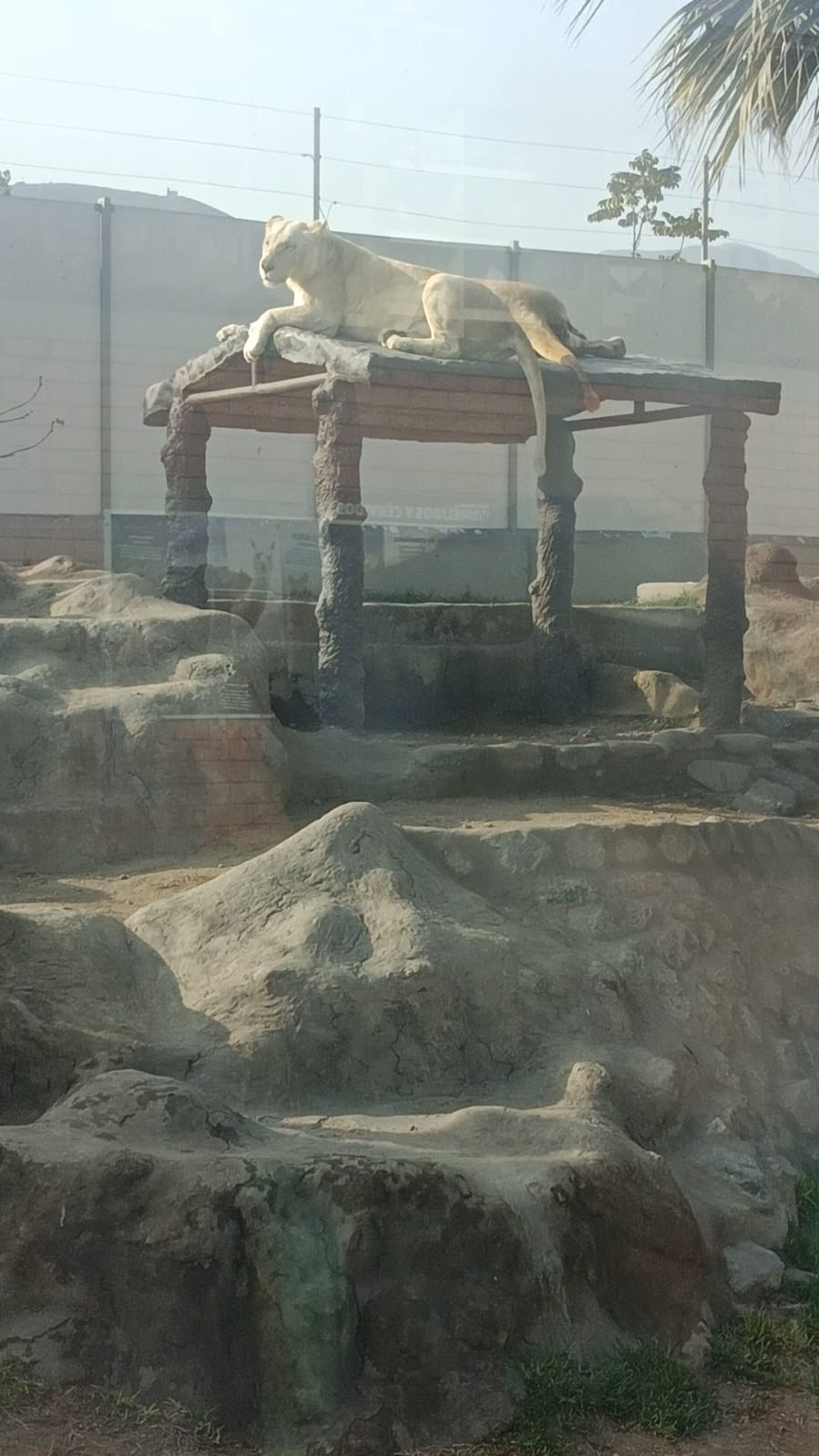
White Lions

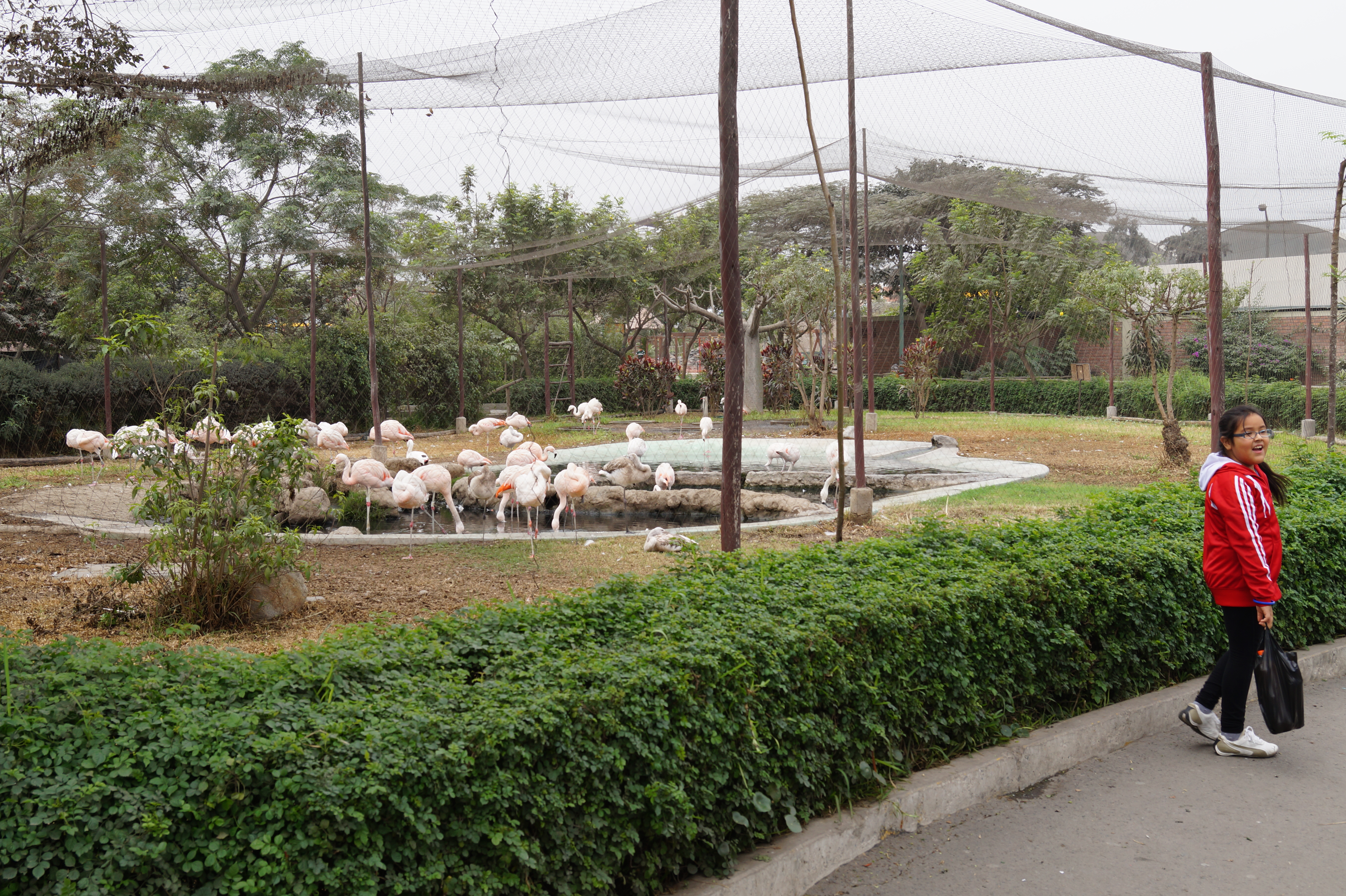
Chilean Flamingo

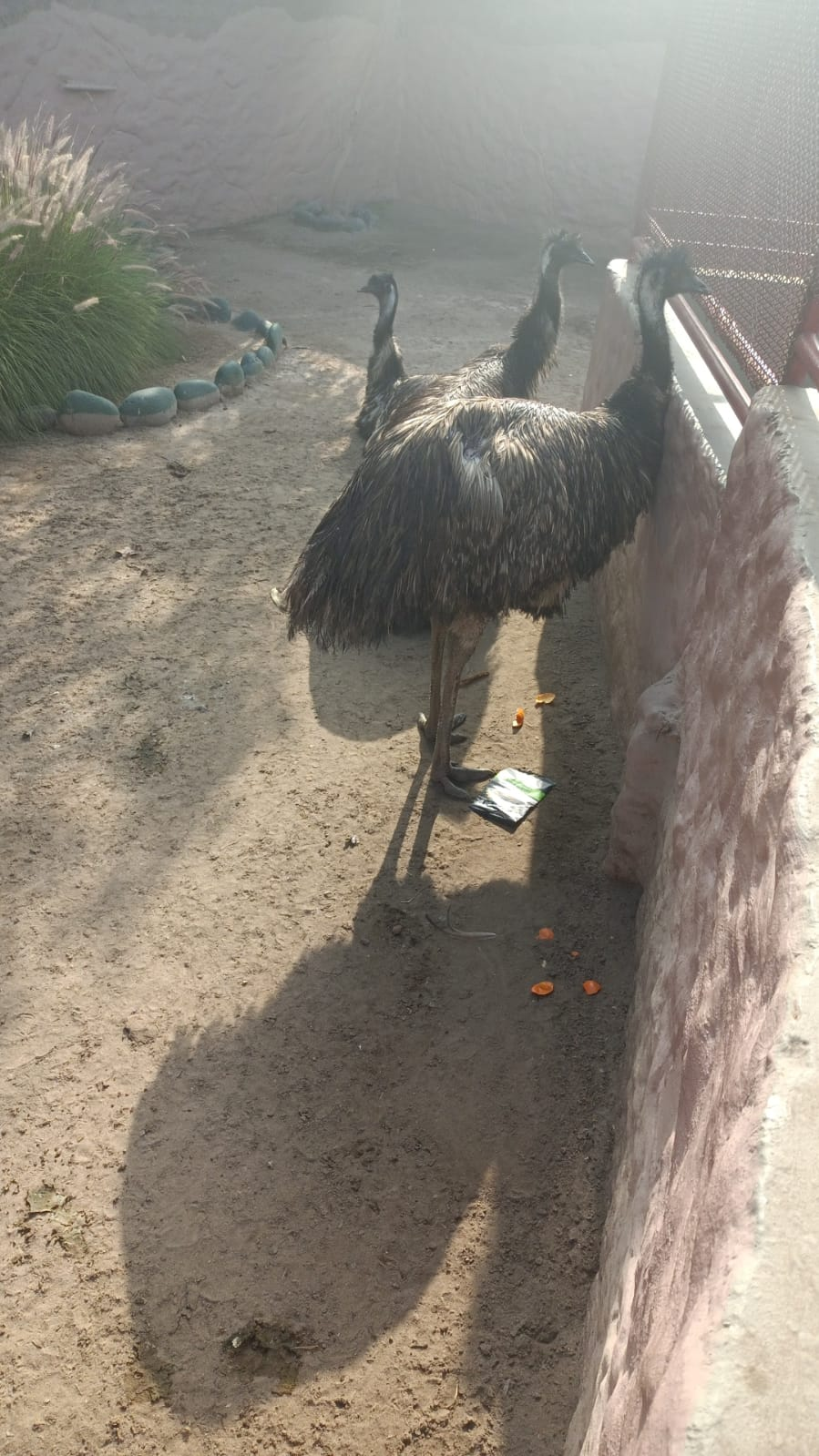
Emu, at the Australia exhibits

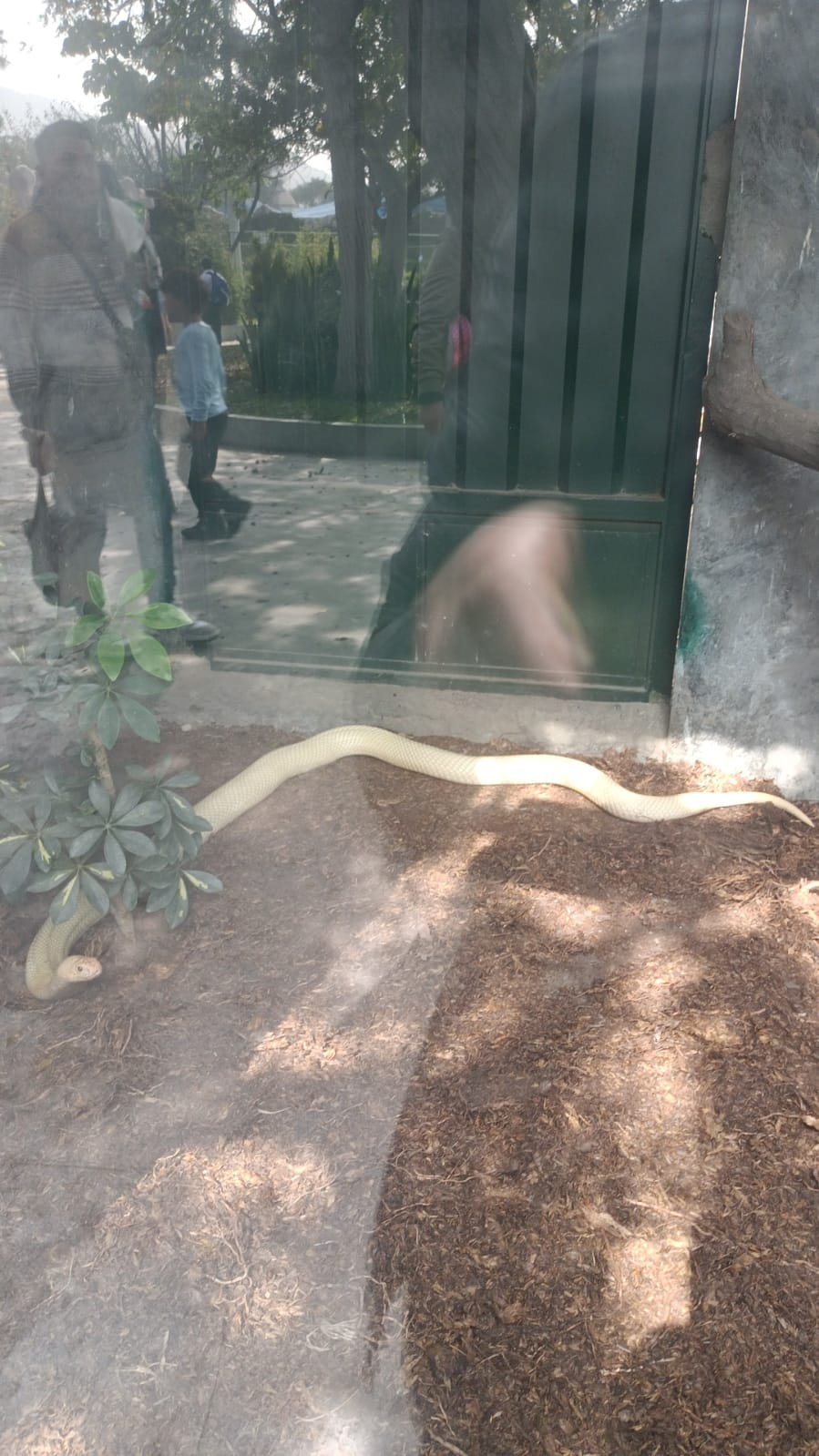
Albino Monocled cobra

== See also ==
- Parque de la Exposición, which once functioned as the city's zoo.
