= Monument to Chabuca Granda =

Monument in Peru

Coordinates: 12°08′56″S 77°01′22″W

- Monumento a Chabuca Granda
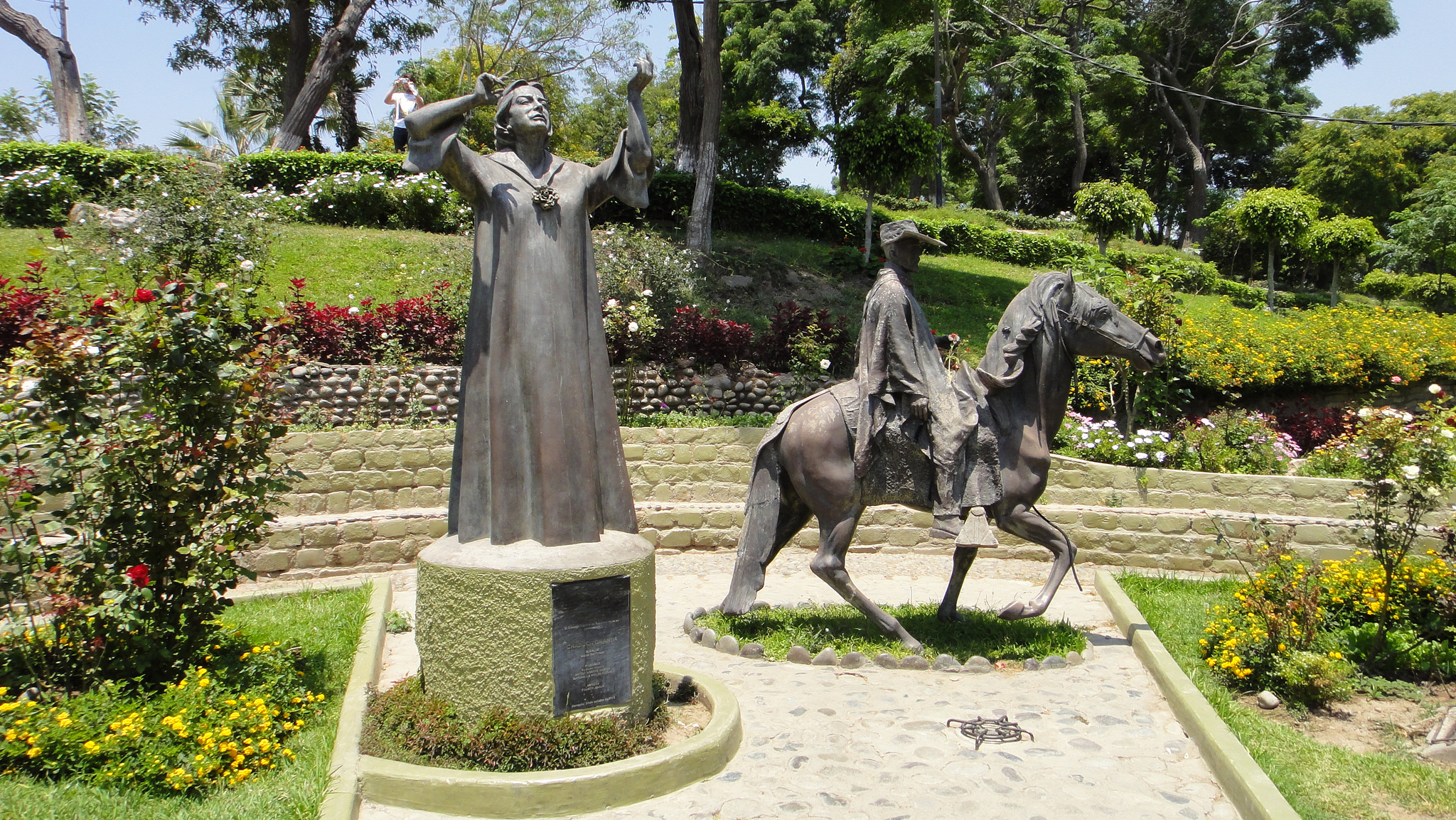
- Location: Plazuela Chabuca Granda
- Designer: Fausto Jaulis
- Type: Statue
- Material: Stone
- Opening date: October 24, 1992
- Dedicated to: Chabuca Granda; José Antonio Lavalle

The Monument to Chabuca Granda (Spanish: Monumento a Chabuca Granda) is a monument made up by a pair of stone statues located at the Plazuela Chabuca Granda in Barranco District, Lima, dedicated to Peruvian singer-songwriter Chabuca Granda. Next to Granda's statue is an equestrian statue of José Antonio de Lavalle y García, the subject of Granda's song José Antonio.

== History ==
Granda lived part of her childhood on a ranch at the Bajada de los Baños in the district of Barranco until she was twelve years old, near the Bridge of Sighs, to which in 1960 she dedicated a song of the same name.

As a result of this tribute to a major landmark of the district, the municipality decided to erect a sculpture in gratitude to her. The monument, a stone work by Fausto Jaulis, an artist from Ayacucho, was inaugurated on October 24, 1992, in the Plazuela Chabuca Granda, next to the Bridge of Sighs. Next to it stands the monument to the José Antonio de Lavalle y García, to whom Chabuca dedicated the song José Antonio.

In Santiago de Chile, a replica of the statue was unveiled in 2015.

In 2021, Lavalle's statue was vandalised, with its head removed. It was quickly restored to its original state and an investigation was launched.

== See also ==
- Bridge of Sighs (Lima)
- Hermitage of Barranco
