= Hermitage of Barranco =

Church in Peru

Coordinates: 12°08′57″S 77°01′23″W

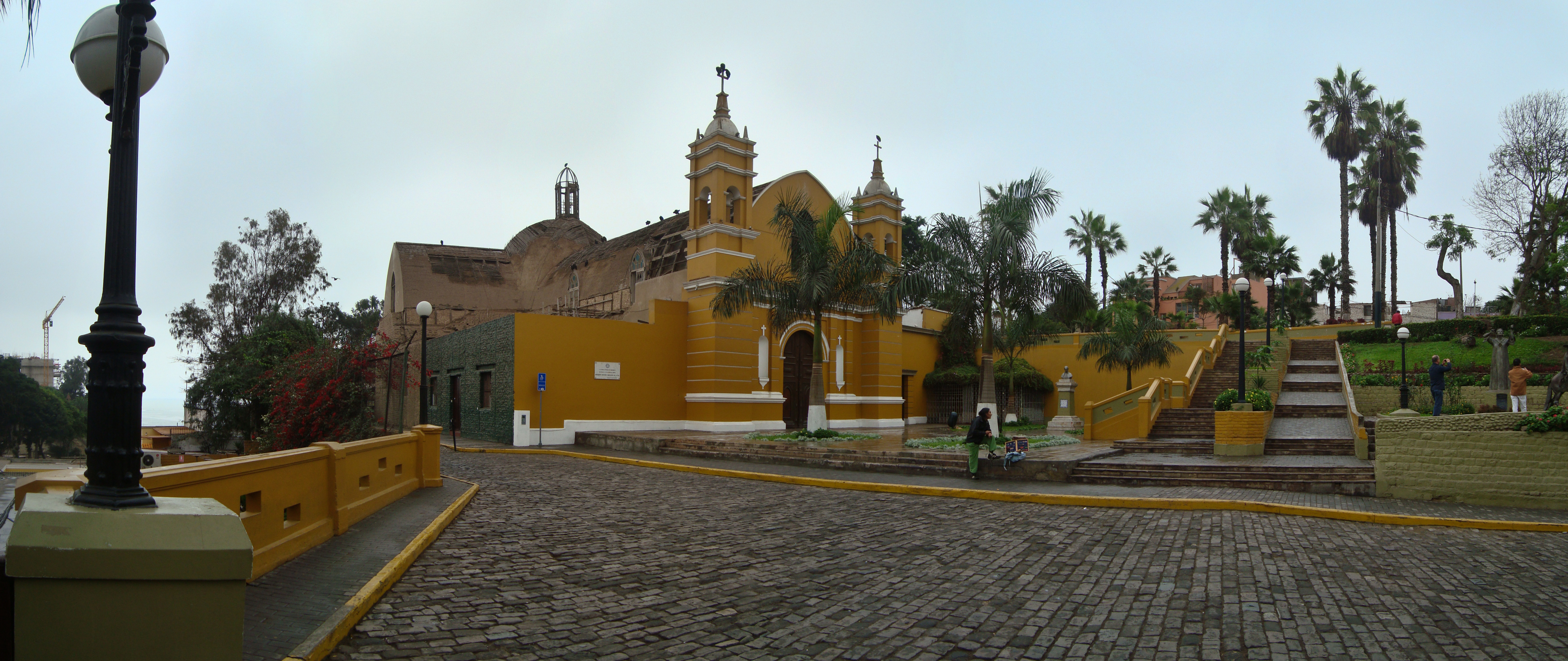
- Hermitage of Barranco
- Country: Peru
- Denomination: Catholic

History
- Status: Closed
- Founded: 18th century

Architecture
- Architectural type: Gothic Revival
- Closed: 1974

Administration
- Archdiocese: Lima

The Hermitage of Barranco (Spanish: Ermita de Barranco), formerly known as the Templo de la Santísima Cruz and later as Santísima Cruz de Barranco, is a Catholic church building in Barranco District, Lima, Peru. It is located in the district's historic centre and once served as the district's capital and cathedral, next to the Bridge of Sighs, and has been closed since 1974 due to the damages caused by that year's earthquake.

The Plazuela Chabuca Granda, named after the Peruvian singer who dedicated a song to the bridge, serves as the main public area outside the church and features two statues by sculptor Fausto Jaulis dedicated to Granda and José Antonio de Lavalle y García, the subject of another song of hers. It was inaugurated on October 24, 1992.

== History ==
The location of the church is traditionally considered the origin of the district, with an 18th-century legend claiming that two Indian fishermen who had become lost at sea managed to find their way to the shore through a light cast by a cross located there.

The church was built in the mid-18th century as a small chapel where humble fishermen and travelers attended mass, financed by a Mr. Caicedo, a baker and devout Catholic. Caicedo died at the end of the century, leaving the project incomplete, which was finished with the name of Templo de la Santísima Cruz in honour of the fishermen's miracle.

In 1874, it was chosen as the centre and capital of the town of San José de Surco, created by Manuel Pardo y Lavalle on October 26, with the neighbourhoods of Talana, Condesa, Ollería, Tejada, Larrión and Pacayar under its jurisdiction, bordered to the north by the Quebrada honda de Armendáriz and the chacra del Cuadrado to the south.

On January 14, 1881, the unfinished church was looted and destroyed by a fire, both perpetrated by the Chilean Army, during the War of the Pacific, it was rebuilt in 1882 through funds acquired by Chaplain Manuel de la Fuente Chávez from local donations and some funds from Patricio Lynch.

On December 12, 1903, the archbishop of Lima accepted the district's 1900 request that the church be elevated to a parish, independent from Surco and Chorrillos, with the temple now known as the Santísima Cruz de Barranco and under the direction of de la Fuente (1903–1913, died in office). After de la Fuente's death, he was succeeded by the Spaniard Santiago Roca (1914–1937).

=== Damage and gradual replacement ===
The church was damaged during the 1940 Lima earthquake, leading to a request being made to the archbishop, requesting his authorisation to build a new church, which was granted in 1942 and with construction works starting in 1944 before being ultimately consecrated by Juan Landázuri Ricketts on June 1, 1963, in a ceremony attended by the church's patrons, siblings Pedro and Angélica de Osma Gildemeister. The original church was declared a historic monument subject to the care of the National Conservation Council, and renovated in 1960 by th pro-restoration committee established by architect Alberto Aranzaens in 1957. In was subsequently declared part of the cultural heritage of Peru in 1972, through Supreme Resolution 2972-ED.

It was again damaged during the 1974 Lima earthquake and has since been closed to the public. In 2016, reconstruction works were reported to be carried out by the Plan COPESCO Nacional.

== See also ==
- Bridge of Sighs (Lima)
- 1974 Lima earthquake
- Chabuca Granda
