= Museum of Contemporary Art of Lima =

Museum in Peru

Museum of Contemporary Art
- Museo de Arte Contemporáneo

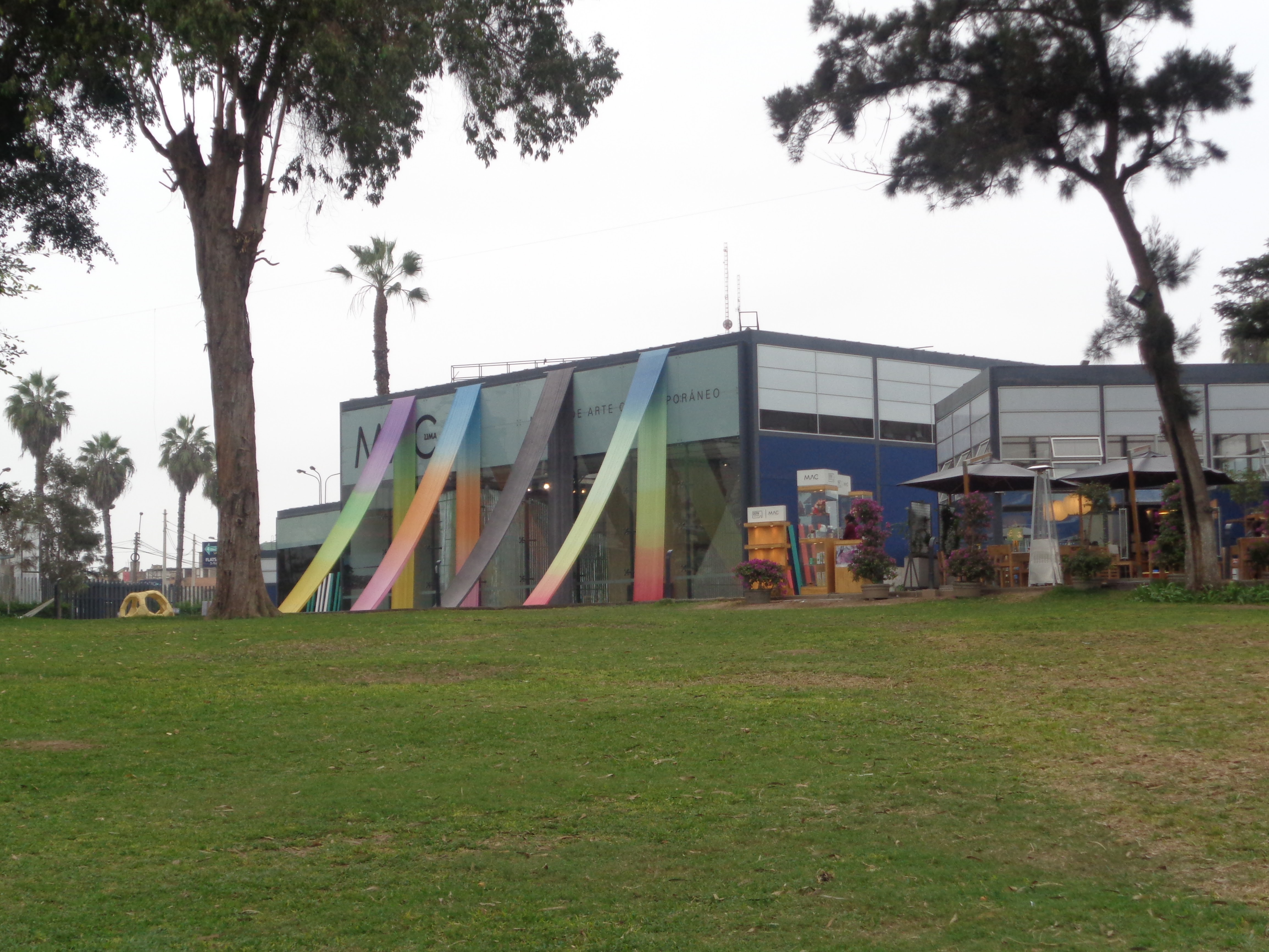
- Established: January 2013
- Location: Av. Grau 511, Barranco, Lima
- Coordinates: 12°08′13″S 77°01′24″W
- Type: Art museum
- Website: maclima.pe

The Museum of Contemporary Art of Lima (Spanish: Museo de Arte Contemporáneo de Lima, MAC Lima) is a contemporary art museum in Barranco District, Lima, Peru. The museum was designed by Peruvian architect Frederick Cooper Llosa and built on land donated by the Municipality of Barranco. It is run as a private non-profit organization.

== History ==
The museum was preceded by the Institute of Contemporary Art (Spanish: Instituto de Arte Contemporáneo, IAC), inaugurated in 1955 in the former premises of the Galería de Lima in the jirón Ocoña. Its inauguration was attended by José Sabogal, Fernando de Szyszlo and other figures. It later moved to the Casa Mujica in the Calle Belén in 1966. Between 1969 and 1972, it occupied the premises of the Museum of Italian Art, and in 1981, plans began for a contemporary art museum.

The museum was formally inaugurated in late January 2013 in an area once occupied by the Barranco Zoo and lake, which closed in 1970. It is located on top of the former artificial lake, once the site of a highly publicised scandal involving a police raid on a restaurant named after the lake.

== Notable exhibitions ==
In 2018, the museum presented Vírgenes de la Puerta by Peruvian artist Juan José Barboza-Gubo and American artist Andrew Mroczek, curated by the museum's head of exhibitions Juan Peralta. The photographic series, made in collaboration with transgender women and portraying them as Catholic saints, generated public controversy, with conservative groups organizing petitions against the exhibition. The exhibition was part of MAC Lima's programming focus on "issues of gender identity, feminism and discrimination".

In December 2024, Contemporáneo 1 opened, an exhibition of the museum's permanent collection, with works by such artists as Jorge Eduardo Eielson, Baldomero Pestana, Fernando De Szyszlo, Elliot Túpac, and Judith Westphalen.

== See also ==
- Peruvian art
- Luis Gálvez Chipoco Stadium
