= Llosa =

Llosa may refer to:

- La Llosa, a village in Castellón, Valencia, Spain
- La Llosa, a former Roman villa and archaeological site in Cambrils, Catalonia, Spain
- Mario Vargas Llosa (born 1936), Peruvian novelist, journalist, essayist and politician
- Frederick Cooper Llosa (born 1939), Peruvian architect and professor
- Claudia Llosa Bueno (born 1976), Peruvian film director and writer
- Luis Llosa (born 1951), Peruvian film director
- Ricardo Pau-Llosa (born 1954), Cuban-American writer
- Vargas Llosa (surname), a Peruvian surname
- Marquess of Vargas Llosa, a Spanish title of nobility
