= Luis Gálvez Chipoco Stadium =

Stadium in Peru

Coordinates: 12.1381°S 77.0235°W

- Estadio Luis Gálvez Chipoco
- Interactive map of Luis Gálvez Chipoco Stadium
- Location: Barranco, Lima, Peru
- Type: Sports venue

Construction
- Opened: 12 October 1986
- Renovated: 2009

Luis Gálvez Chipoco Stadium (Spanish: Estadio Luis Gálvez Chipoco) is a multi-purpose stadium in Barranco, Lima, Peru. It is also, erroneously known as Parque Confraternidad, the name of the public park located there prior to its construction that partially served as the location of Barranco Zoo (Spanish: Zoológico de Barranco), the district's zoo from 1947 until its closure in 1970, when its animals were moved to the Parque de las Leyendas in San Miguel.

== History ==
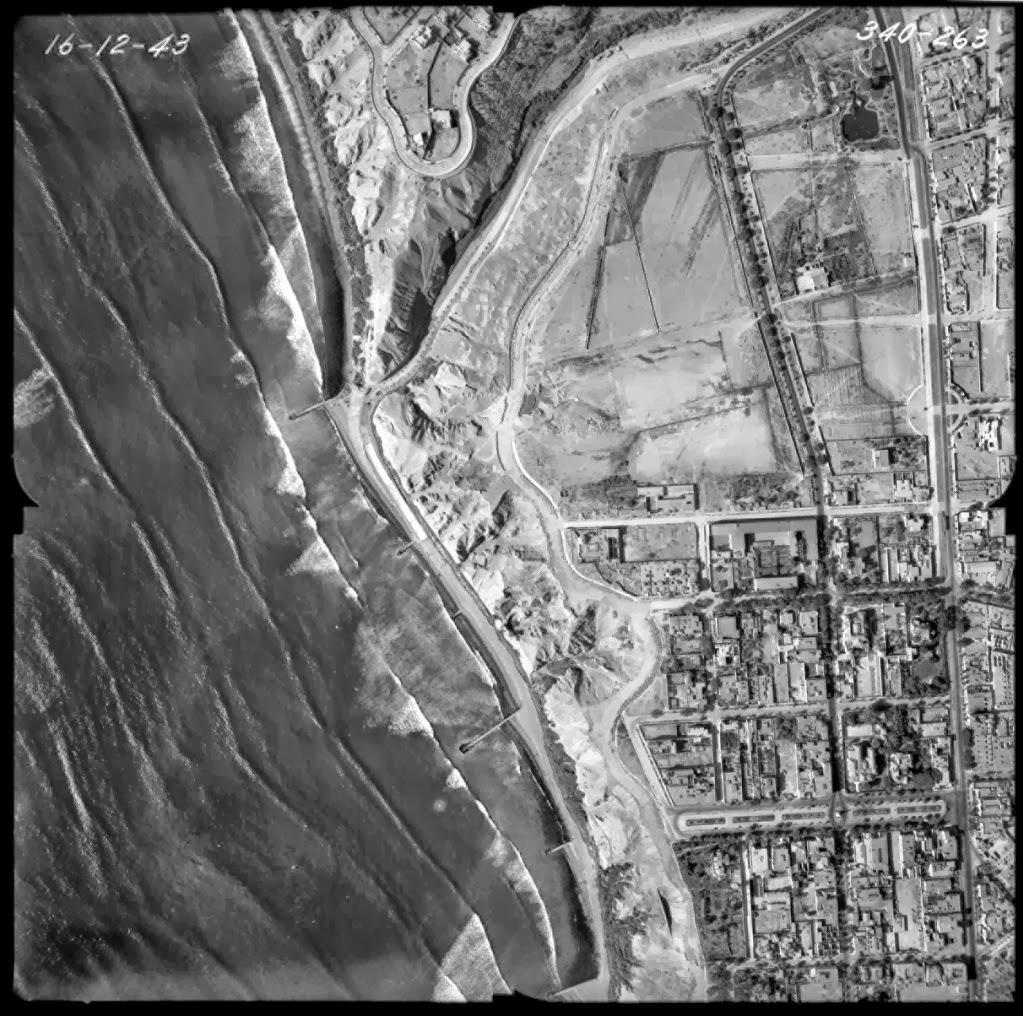
Aerial photograph of the park and the zoo in 1943 by SANDIVRA.

=== Park ===
The area where the stadium is currently located, located at the entrance of the district, near its limit with Miraflores, was originally a public park known as Parque Confraternidad, inaugurated in 1943 and featuring a lake. Under mayor Eduardo Núñez, who took office in 1956, the grounds for the stadium were used in festivities. From 1958 to 1966, a building at the park hosted the district's municipal library until it moved to its current premises in the district's main square.

=== Zoo ===
The park's lake was located adjacent to Barranco Zoo (Spanish: Zoológico de Barranco), created in 1947 with the arrival of the animals previously part of the zoo located at the Parque de la Exposición, eventually developing into a full-fledged zoo with over 600 specimens in 1956.

At least two elephants were purchased from a circus by the district's municipality to form part of the zoo's collection: in 1959, it acquired six-year-old Mary Jumbo from the "Tropicana" circus at the Plaza Dos de Mayo—who refused to board a truck and walked from the historic centre of Lima towards the zoo—and in 1962 another elephant walked the same path, alongside a camel, and two lions, a puma and a siberian bear known as "Chaplin" who rode a bicycle as part of its performances. Additionally, a lioness known as "La Reina" arrived from Costa Rica in 1959, and two polar bears known as Karl and Hilda arrived from California on April 27, 1964.

Other animals featured at the park included condors, hippos and sea lions in the lake, as well as jaguars and pumas. The aforementioned six-ton Mary Jumbo became well known for her calmness when being photographed alongside young visitors, as did a giant turtle originally from the exhibit at the Parque Neptuno. The zoo's collection often received donations from a number of different countries as a symbol of their friendship with Peru.

By the time it closed on May 15, 1970, its number of unique specimens had been reduced to around 250, with all of them moving to the Parque de las Leyendas, inaugurated in 1964.

=== Namesake ===
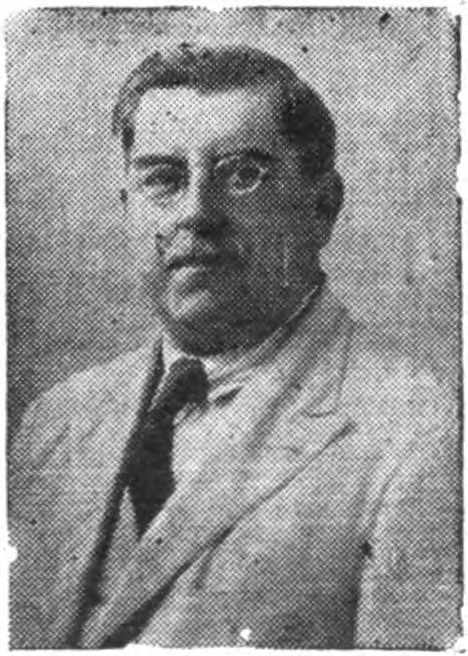
Luis Gálvez Chipoco (1877–1960)

The stadium is named after former CONSUDATLE President Dr. Luis Gálvez Chipoco, (Arica; September 6, 1877 — Barranco; March 27, 1960). Dr. Gálvez, a descendant of Peruvian philanthropists during the War of the Pacific was also uncle of the celebrated artist Cristina Gálvez. He, at the same time was a descendant of the family of Pedro Menéndez de Avilés. His home still stands in Barranco on Plaza Espinoza, the house is now known as Rancho Galvéz y Martínez-Carrasco, built by his father don Pedro Alcántara Galvéz y Martínez-Carrasco. His brother’s house still stands and is known today as Casona Gálvez Chipoco.

It’s important to note, former mayor Carlos Gálvez Martínez often claims to be a relative of the Gálvez family of Barranco, he is not.

=== Stadium ===
The stadium was inaugurated on October 12, 1986, by then mayor Jorge del Castillo. It features a full-sized soccer field, an athletic track and a swimming pool. The park's remaining area has since become the Park of the Family (Spanish: Parque de la Familia), and it features an artificial lake populated by geese whose conditions have been criticised on numerous occasions.

In 2009, a modernised athletic track was inaugurated as part of Peru's bid to host the 2015 Pan American Games due to a design error at the renovated National Stadium.

== See also ==
- Museum of Contemporary Art, Lima
