= Miguel Grau Avenue (Barranco) =

Avenue in Lima, Peru

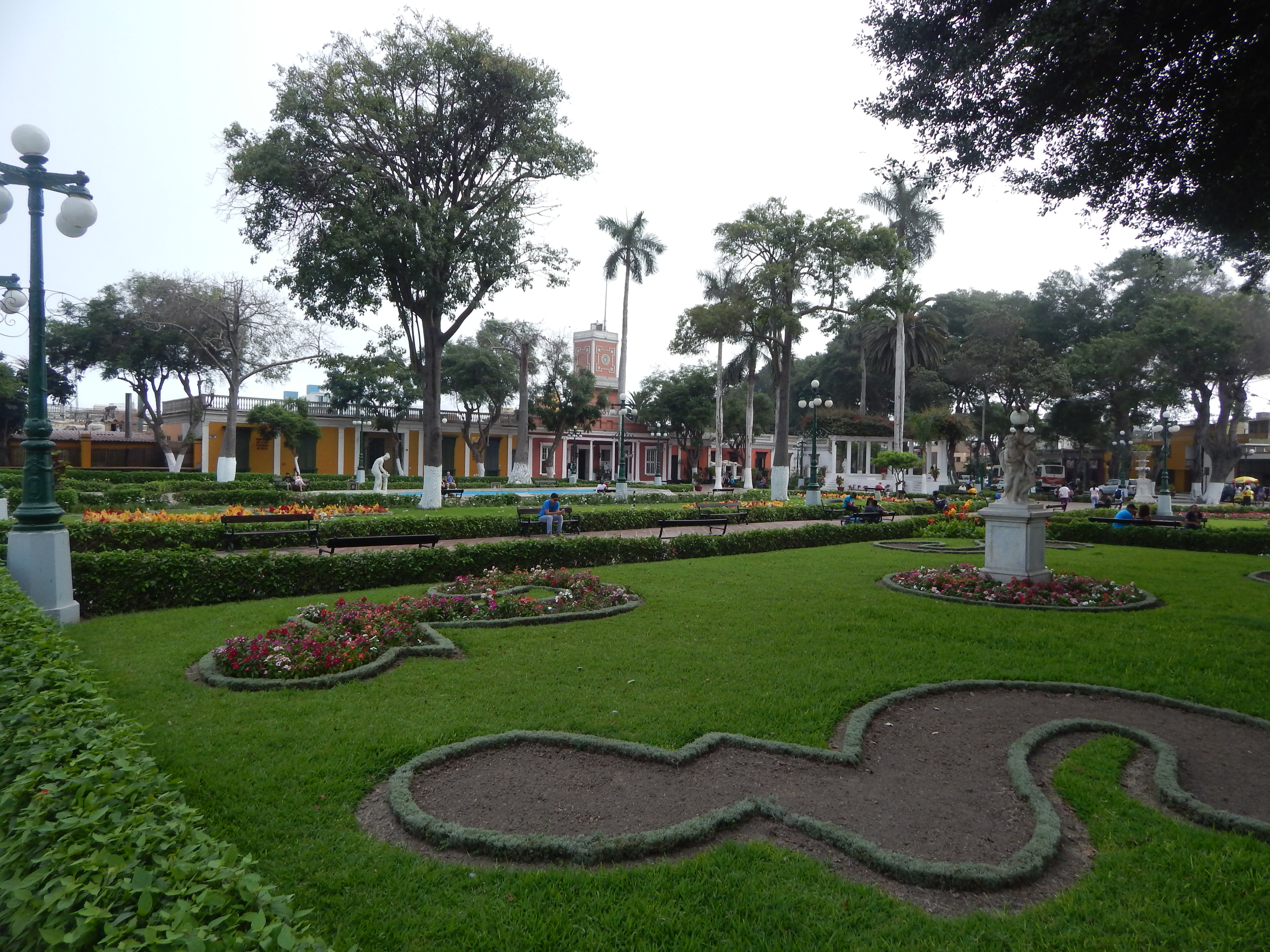
- The main square of Barranco seen from the avenue
- Part of: Historic Centre of Barranco
- Namesake: Miguel Grau; José María Eguren (to 1956)
- From: Panamericana Sur
- Major junctions: Avenida El Sol, Jirón Sáenz Peña
- To: Reducto Bridge

Admiral Miguel Grau Avenue (Spanish: Avenida Almirante Miguel Grau), formerly known as José María Eguren until 1956 and as Mendiburu prior to that, is a major avenue that crosses vertically through central Barranco District in Lima, Peru. It is the district's main commercial route, with a total span of 16 blocks.

== Overview ==
Part of the district's historic centre, it starts at its intersection with the Panamericana Sur and continues until it reaches Reducto Bridge (located above Armendariz road), which joins Barranco with the district of Miraflores. Since 2019, the avenue runs from north to south from its intersection with the jirón Centenario.

The avenue houses buildings such as the Museum of Contemporary Art of Lima, located on its first blocks and founded in 2013. It also crosses through the city's municipal park.

== Gallery ==
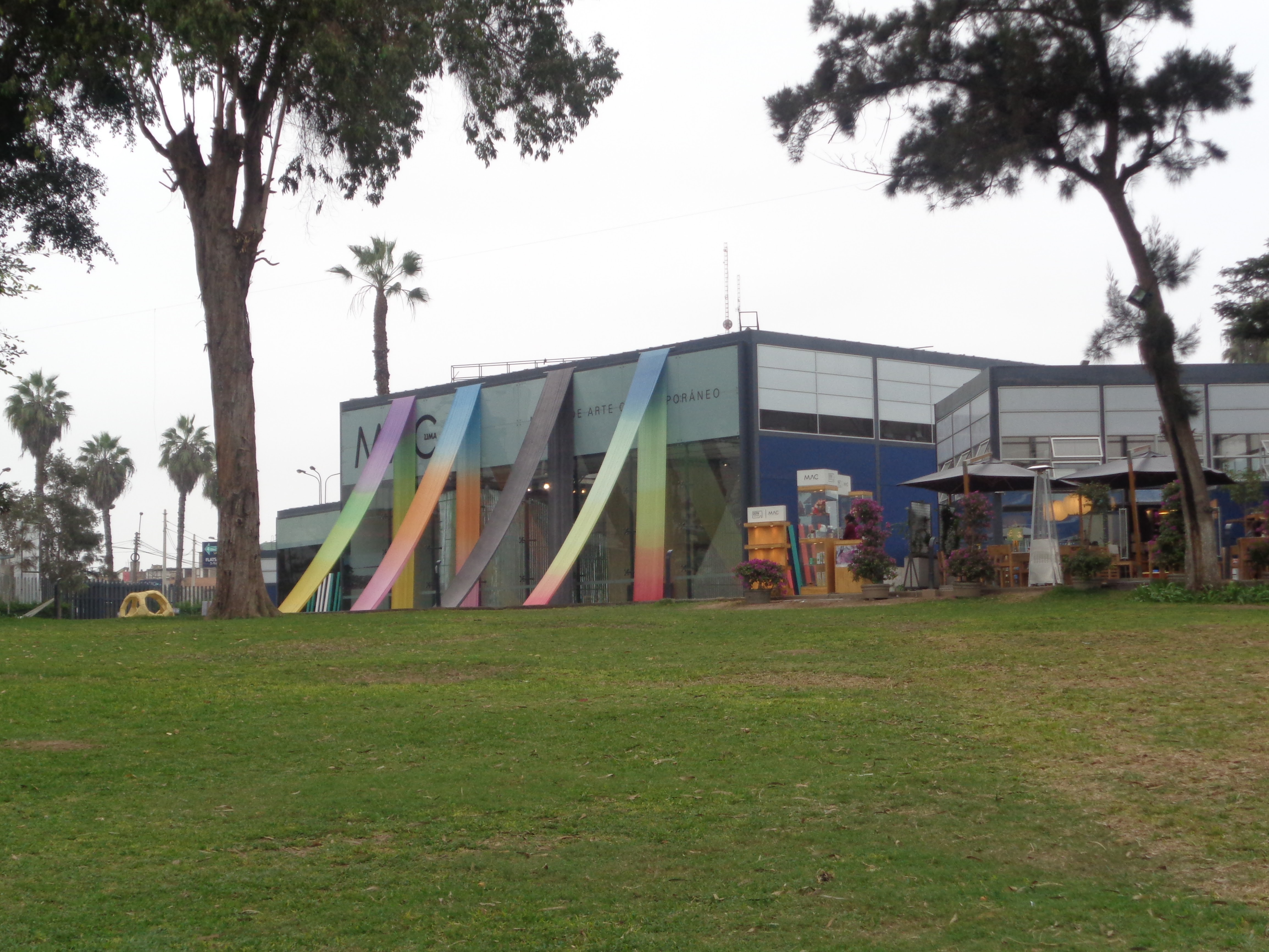
The Museum of Contemporary Art

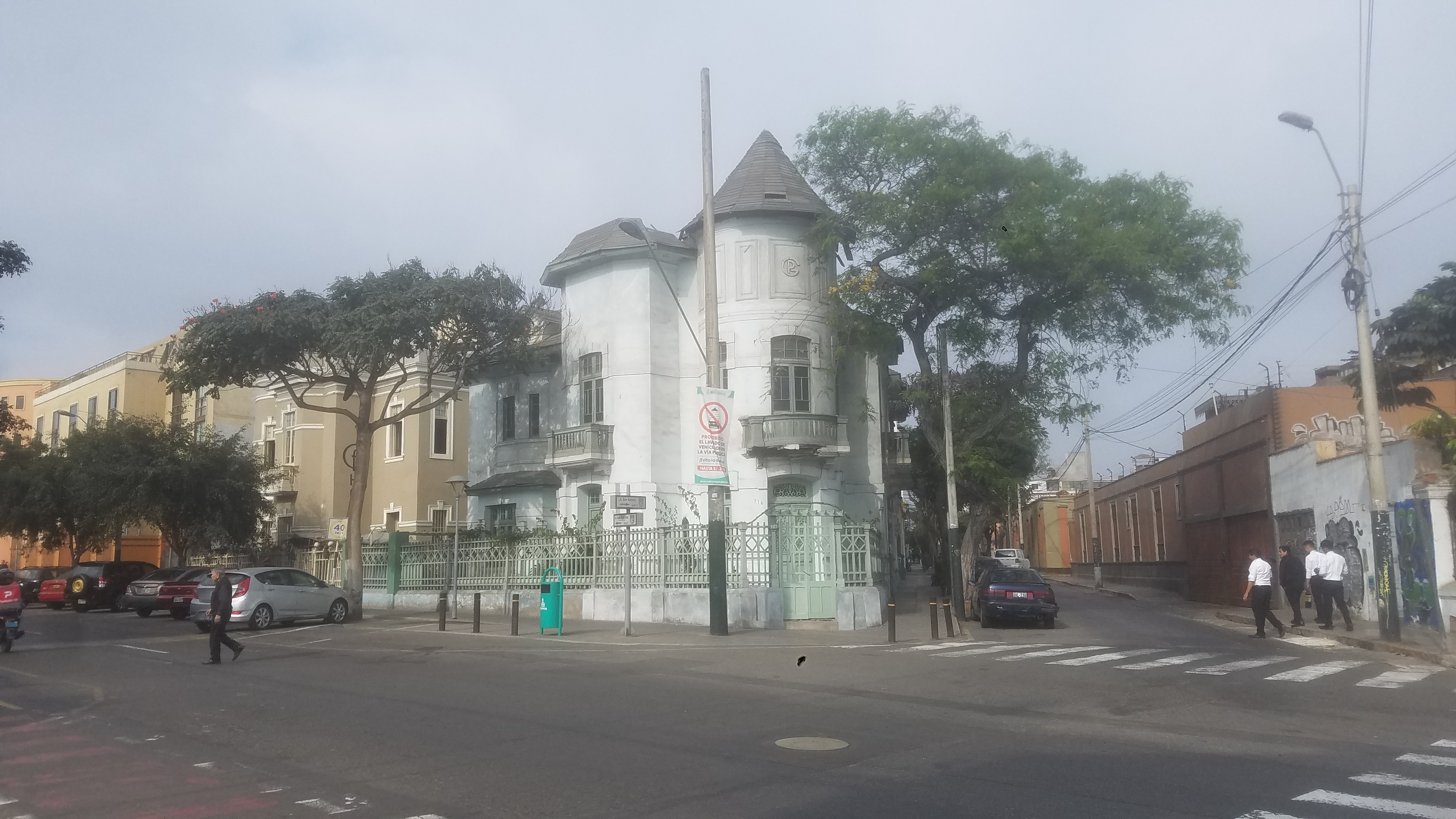
House at the corner with San Antonio street

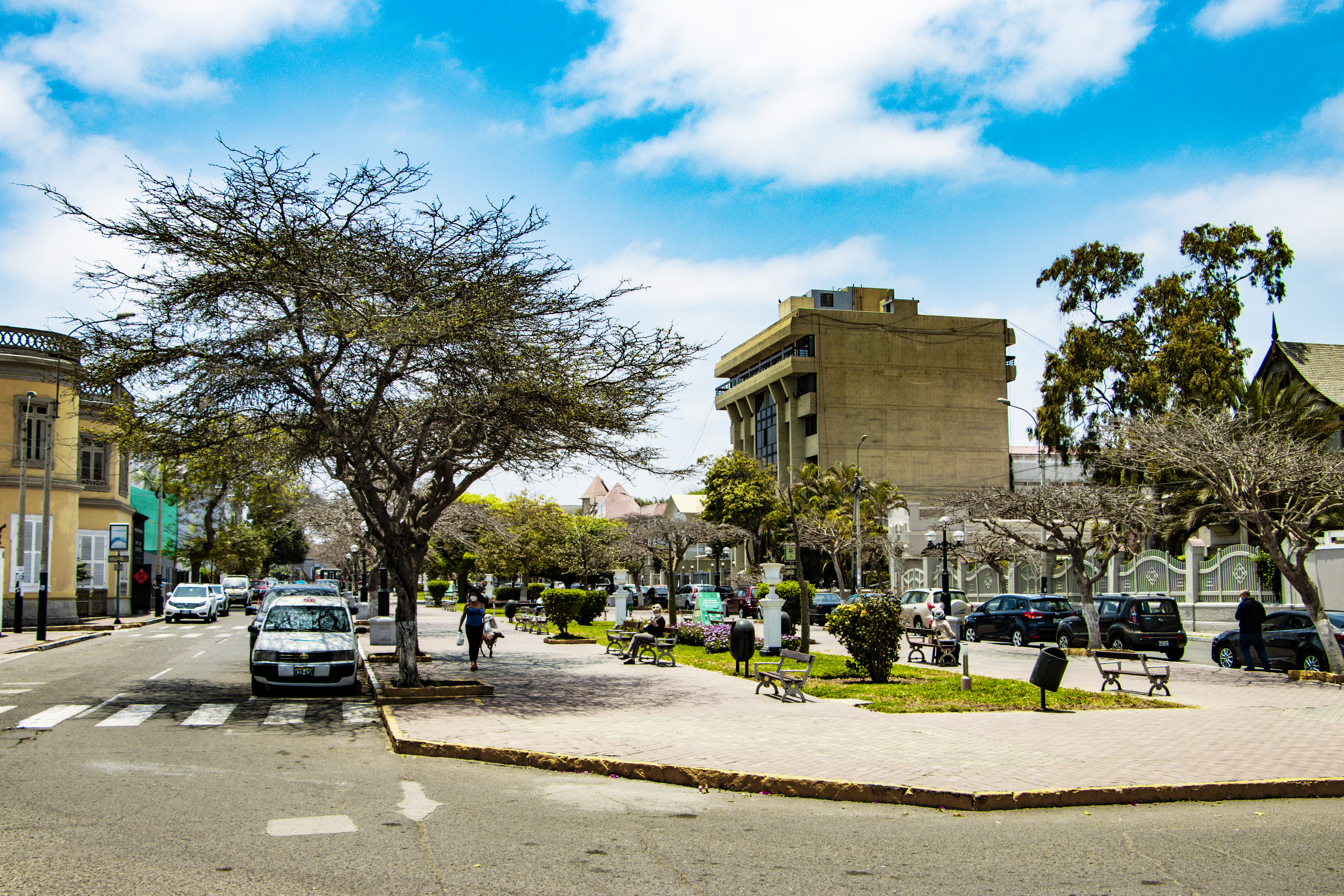
Intersection with Sáenz Peña street

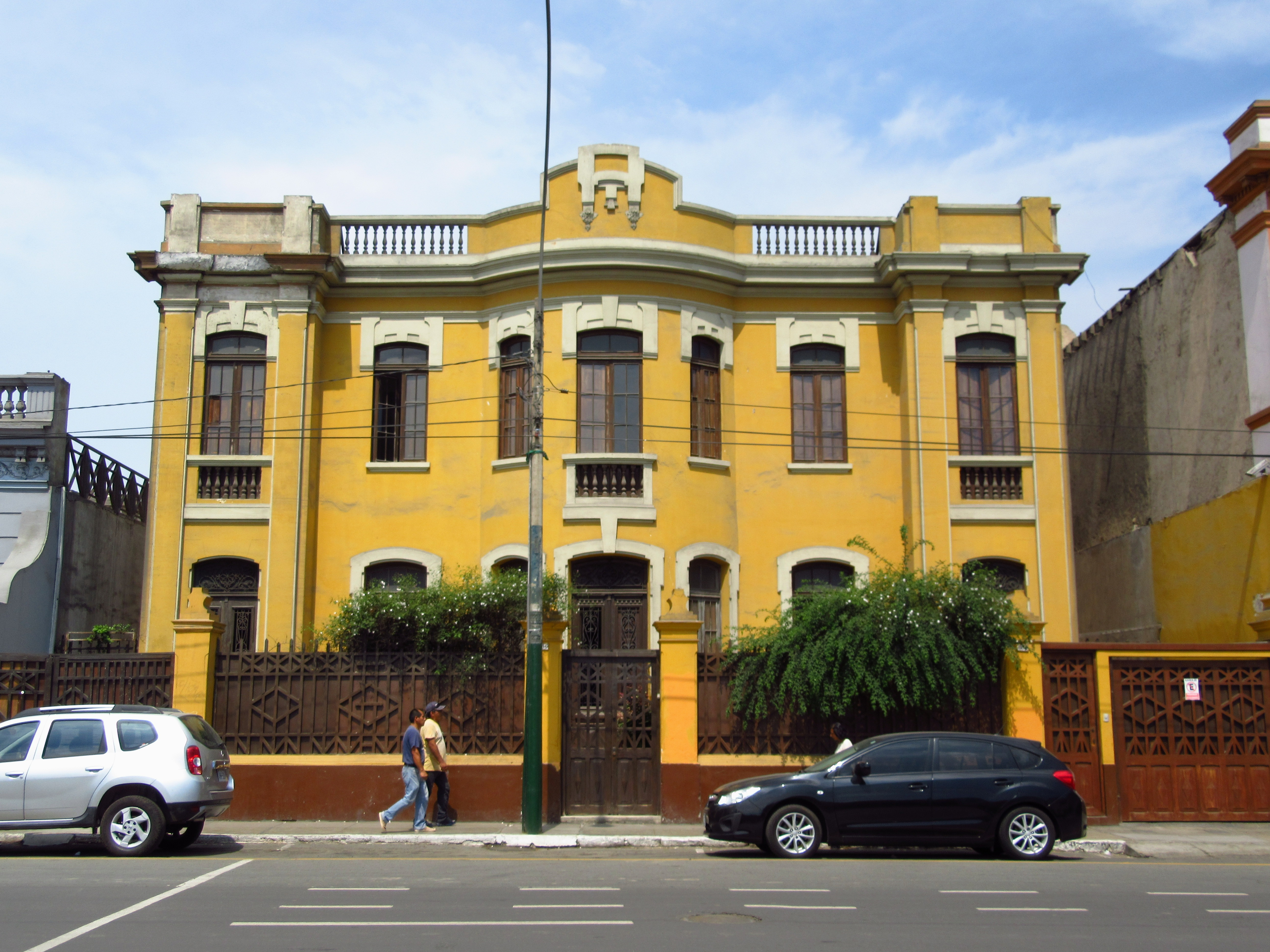
Ditto

== See also ==
- Barranco District
