= Bridge of Sighs (Lima) =

Bridge in Barranco, Peru

Bridge of Sighs Puente de los Suspiros
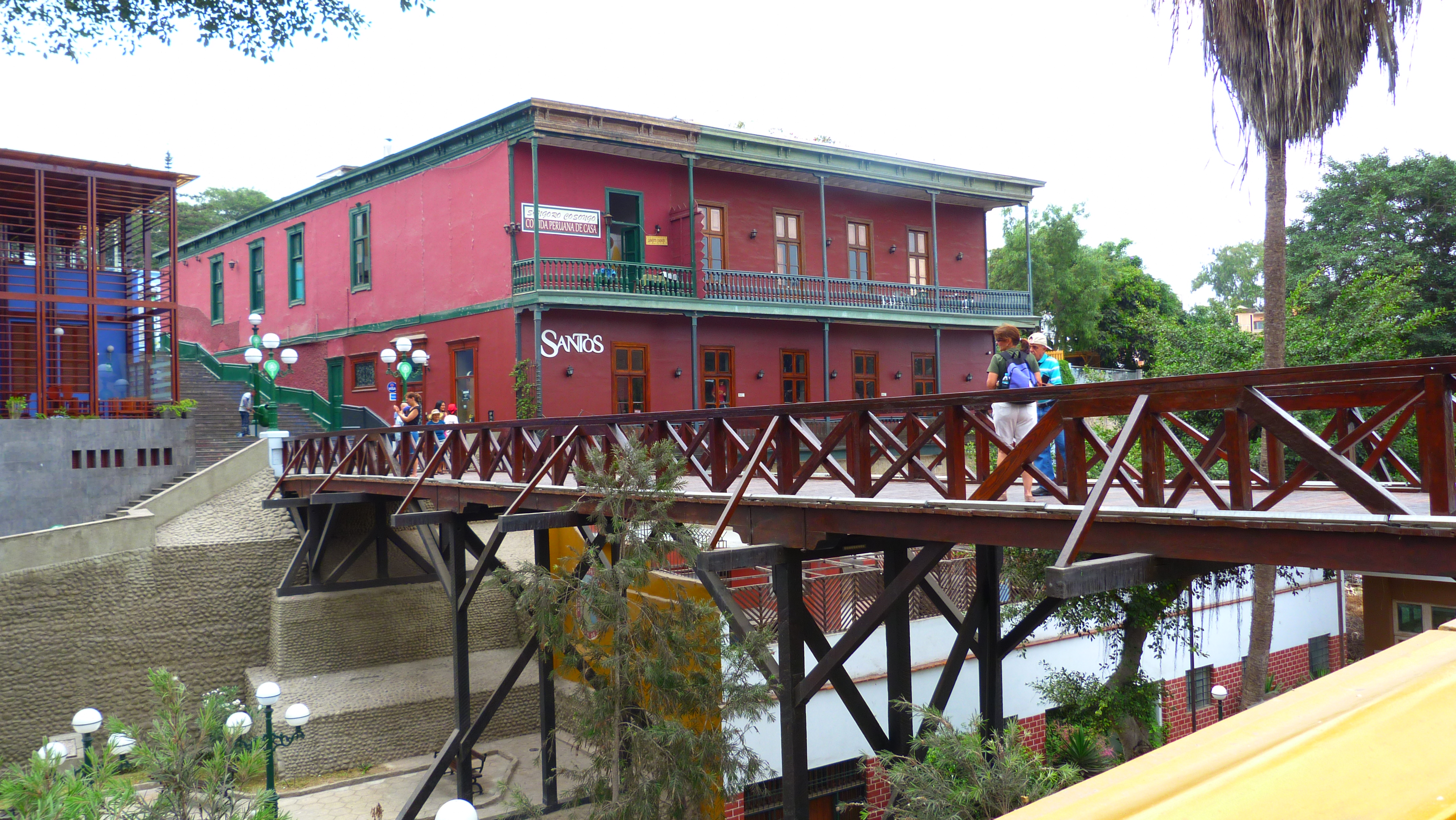
- The bridge in 2016
- Coordinates: 12°08′57″S 77°01′21″W

History
- Inaugurated: 1876

Location
- Interactive map of Bridge of Sighs

The Bridge of Sighs (Spanish: Puente de los Suspiros) is a wooden pedestrian overpass located between the Hermitage of Barranco and the Paseo Chabuca Granda (also known by its former name of Pasaje Zepita) in Barranco District, in Lima, Peru. It is one of the most visited tourist places in the historic district, and a meeting point for couples in love.

== Overview ==
The bridge, 44 metres long and 3 metres wide, joins Ayacucho Street with the Paseo Chabuca Granda (the access to the hermitage of Barranco that runs up until it reaches Pedro de Osma Avenue), while, by joining the ends of the ravine and saving a height of 8.5 metres, the Bajada of the Baños of Barranco passes below (the road that leads to the district's beaches).

Due to the popular tradition that indicated the place as a meeting point for lovers and romances, the bridge became known as the bridge "of sighs".

== History ==
The bridge was inaugurated during the municipal administration (1875–1878) of Mayor Francisco García Monterroso, on February 14, 1876. During the War of the Pacific, it was destroyed by Chilean troops passing through the place after being victorious in the Battle of Chorrillos on January 13, 1881.

In 1960, the Creole music composer Chabuca Granda dedicated the Peruvian waltz "El puente de los suspiros" to the bridge. Years later, the municipality of the district placed a monument to the singer next to the bridge.

In December 2014, after six months of restoration work, the bridge was reopened to the public. The investment for the job was S/. 10 million.

In the early morning of June 3, 2023, the structural integrity of a building built in 1911 located next to the bridge became compromised, causing a partial collapse of a section of a wall that faces the passage that leads to the bridge, leading to the closure of the area, including the bridge. Its reconstruction was soon announced.

== Gallery ==
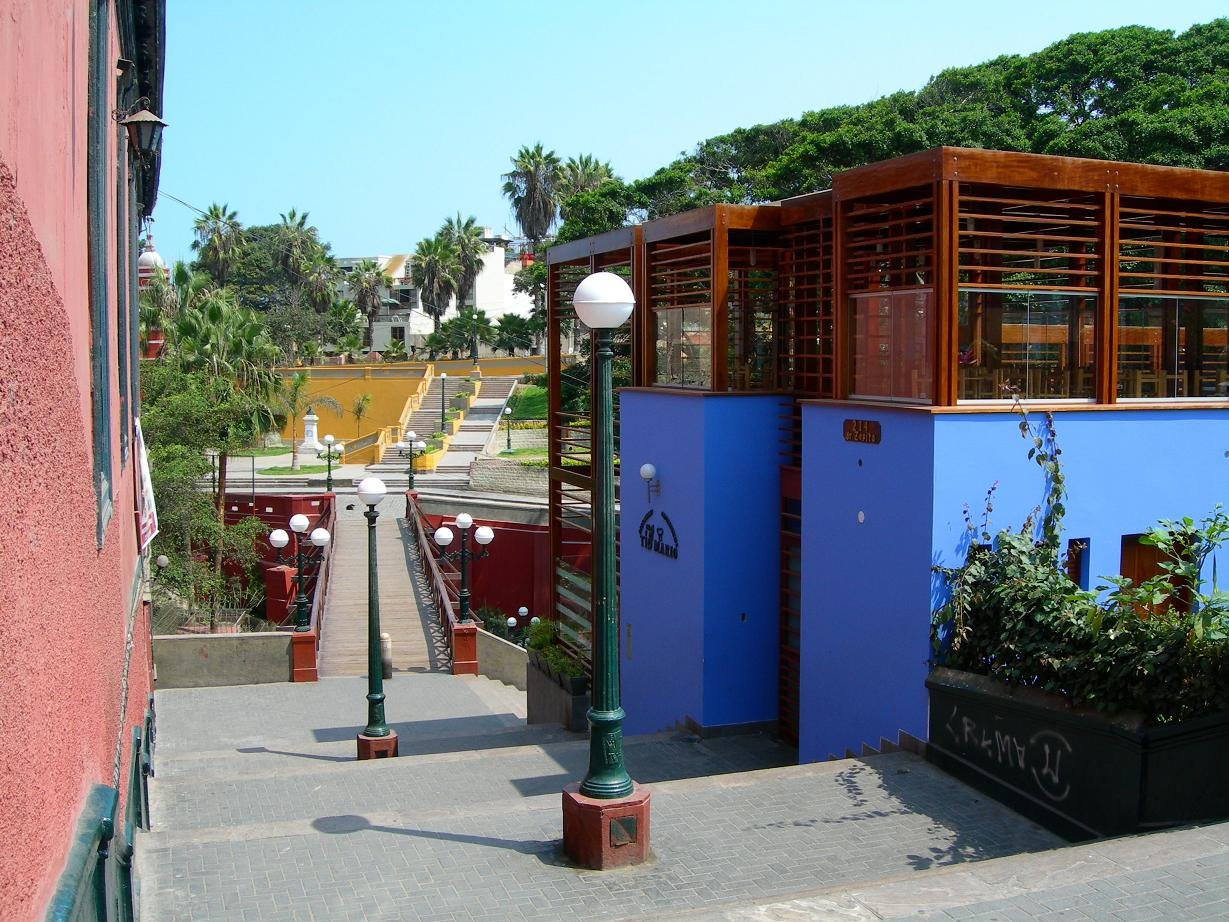
Seen from the Bajada de Baños

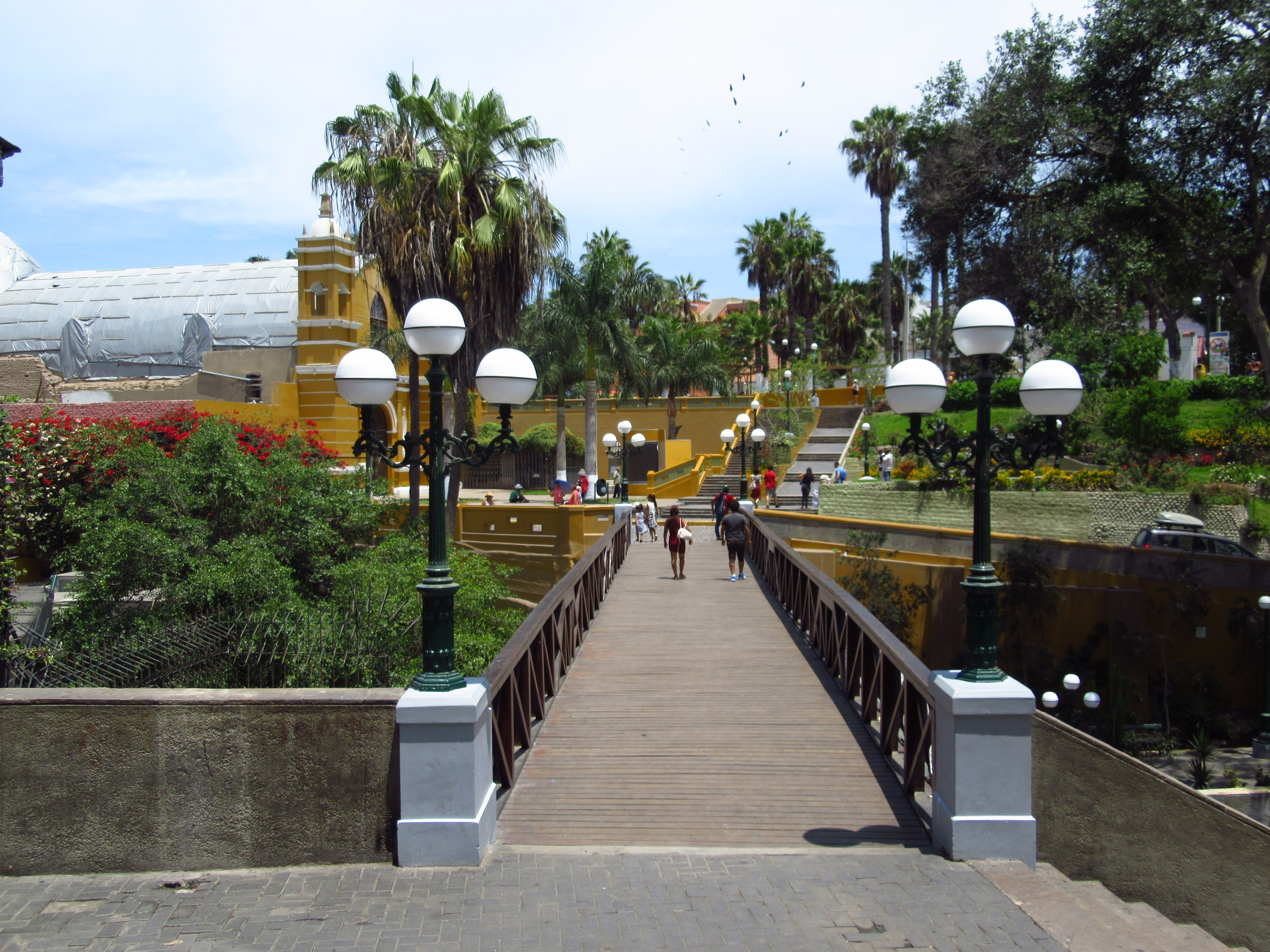
Ditto.

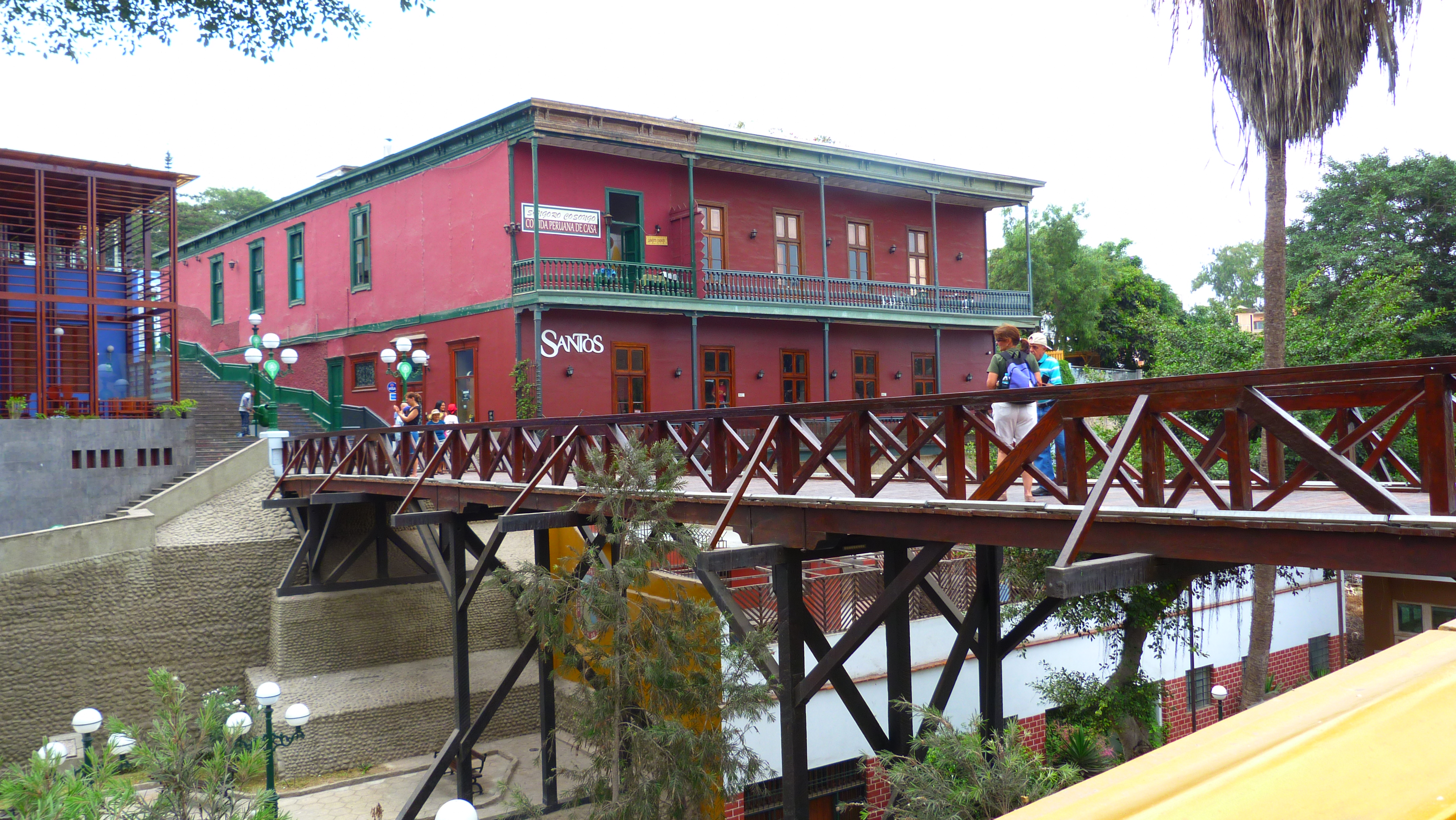
Opposite view

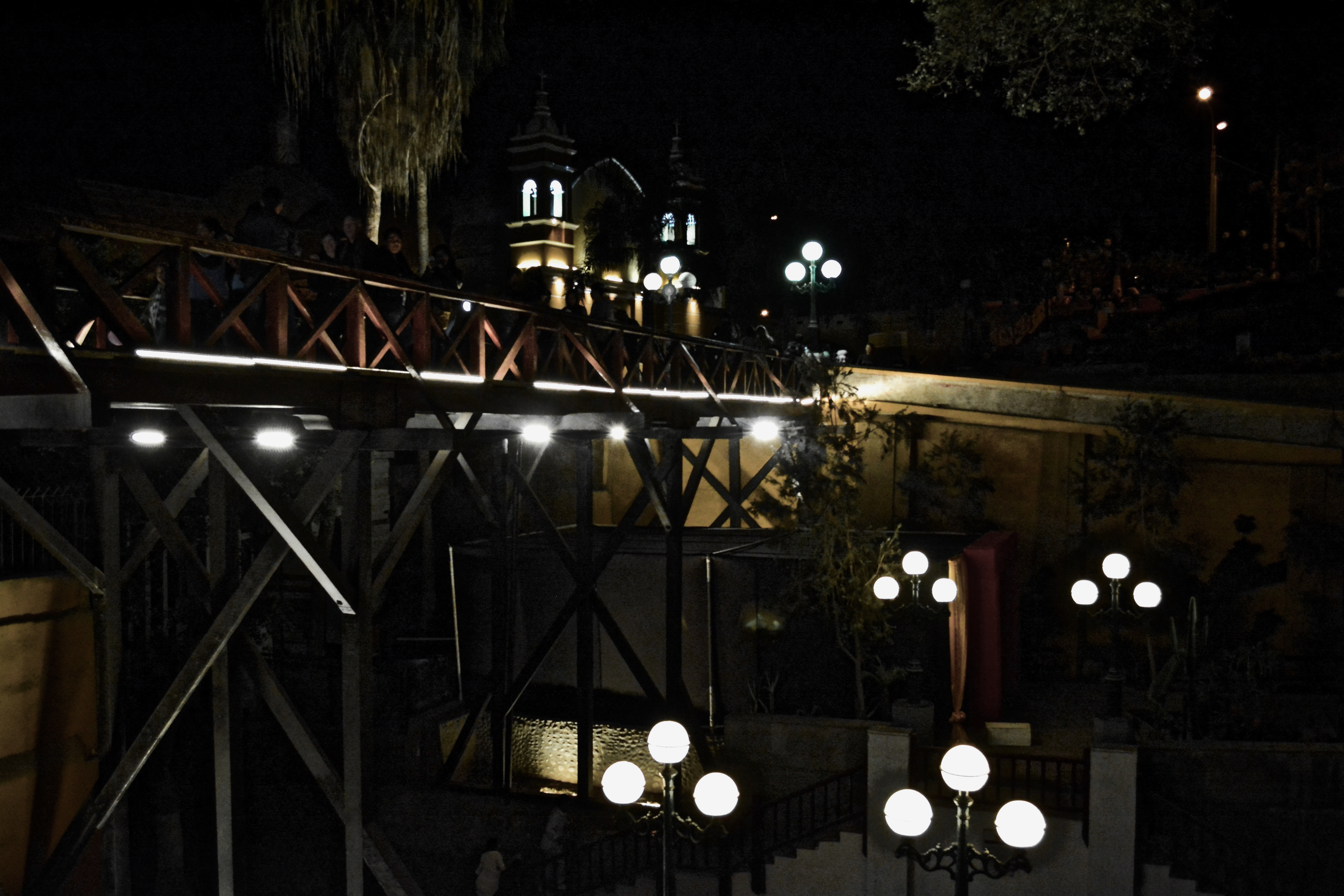
The bridge at night

== See also ==
- El puente de los suspiros (song)
- Monument to Chabuca Granda
