= La Laguna scandal =

Scandal at an LGBTQ party in Lima

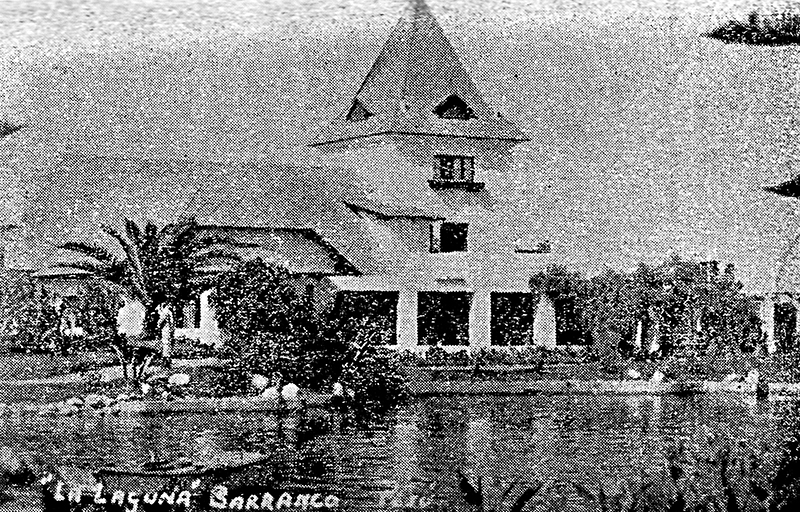
- "La Laguna", several years prior to the scandal
- Date: January 31, 1959
- Location: Barranco District, Lima, Peru; 12.0813°S 77.0123°W
- Type: Police raid and detention

The La Laguna scandal was a police raid that took place on January 31, 1959 at "La Laguna", a restaurant located in the Lima district of Barranco in Peru.

== History ==
At around 22:00 on January 30, 1959, a party began at the restaurant, attended by people dressed in suits and others in women's clothing, accompanied by makeup artists, hairstylists, and dancers. There was also a "competition of luxurious costumes, jewelry, and ornaments", as the newspaper La Prensa described it, which Coco Geis would go on to win. Although there was no police response during the hours in which the party took place, it occurred during the hours and days after due to complaints from the residents of the area and the mayor of Barranco. On February 4, La Crónica reported that four of the party attendees had been arrested.

The Peruvian press gave extensive sensationalist coverage to the scandal, reporting on the arrests of the homosexuals involved, most of whom were transgender. There was also speculation in the press that Miguel Zapata Borda, who years earlier had intended to undergo sex reassignment surgery in Denmark after learning of Christine Jorgensen, may have been present at the party in La Laguna.

Following the La Laguna scandal, the restaurant would go on to be replaced by another establishment called "El Caballo Negro." The scandal has been compared to other gay dances that occurred in Latin America during the 20th century, such as the dance of the forty-one in Mexico.

== See also ==
- LGBTQ rights in Peru
