= Ll =

Digraph

Latin Ll digraph.

Ll or ll is a digraph that occurs in several languages.

== English ==
In English, ⟨ll⟩ often represents the same sound as single ⟨l⟩: /l/. The doubling is used to indicate that the preceding vowel is (historically) short, or that the "l" sound is to be extended longer than a single ⟨l.⟩ would provide (etymologically, in latinisms coming from a gemination). Different English language traditions use ⟨l⟩ and ⟨ll⟩ in different words: for example the past tense form of "travel" is spelt "travelled" in British English but "traveled" in American English. See also: Doubled consonants. ⟨ll⟩ is also used in syllable-coda position in monosyllabic words or compounds derived from them, such as "will", "mall", and "killjoy"

== Welsh ==
The Middle-Welsh LL ligature. Unicode: U+1EFA and U+1EFB.

In Welsh, ⟨ll⟩ stands for a voiceless alveolar lateral fricative sound (IPA: [ɬ]). This sound is very common in place names in Wales because it occurs in the word llan, for example, Llanelli, where the ⟨ll⟩ appears twice, or Llanfairpwllgwyngyll, where (in the long version of the name) the ⟨ll⟩ appears five times – with two instances of llan and two consecutive ⟨ll⟩ in -drobwllllan-.

In Welsh, ⟨ll⟩ is a separate digraph letter from ⟨l⟩ (e.g., lwc sorts before llaw). In modern Welsh this, and other digraph letters, are written with two symbols but count as one letter. In Middle Welsh it was written with a tied ligature; this ligature is included in the Latin Extended Additional Unicode block as U+1EFA Ỻ LATIN CAPITAL LETTER MIDDLE-WELSH LL and U+1EFB ỻ LATIN SMALL LETTER MIDDLE-WELSH LL. This ligature is seldom used in Modern Welsh, but equivalent ligatures may be included in modern fonts, for example the three fonts commissioned by the Welsh Government in 2020.

== Romance languages ==
=== Asturian ===
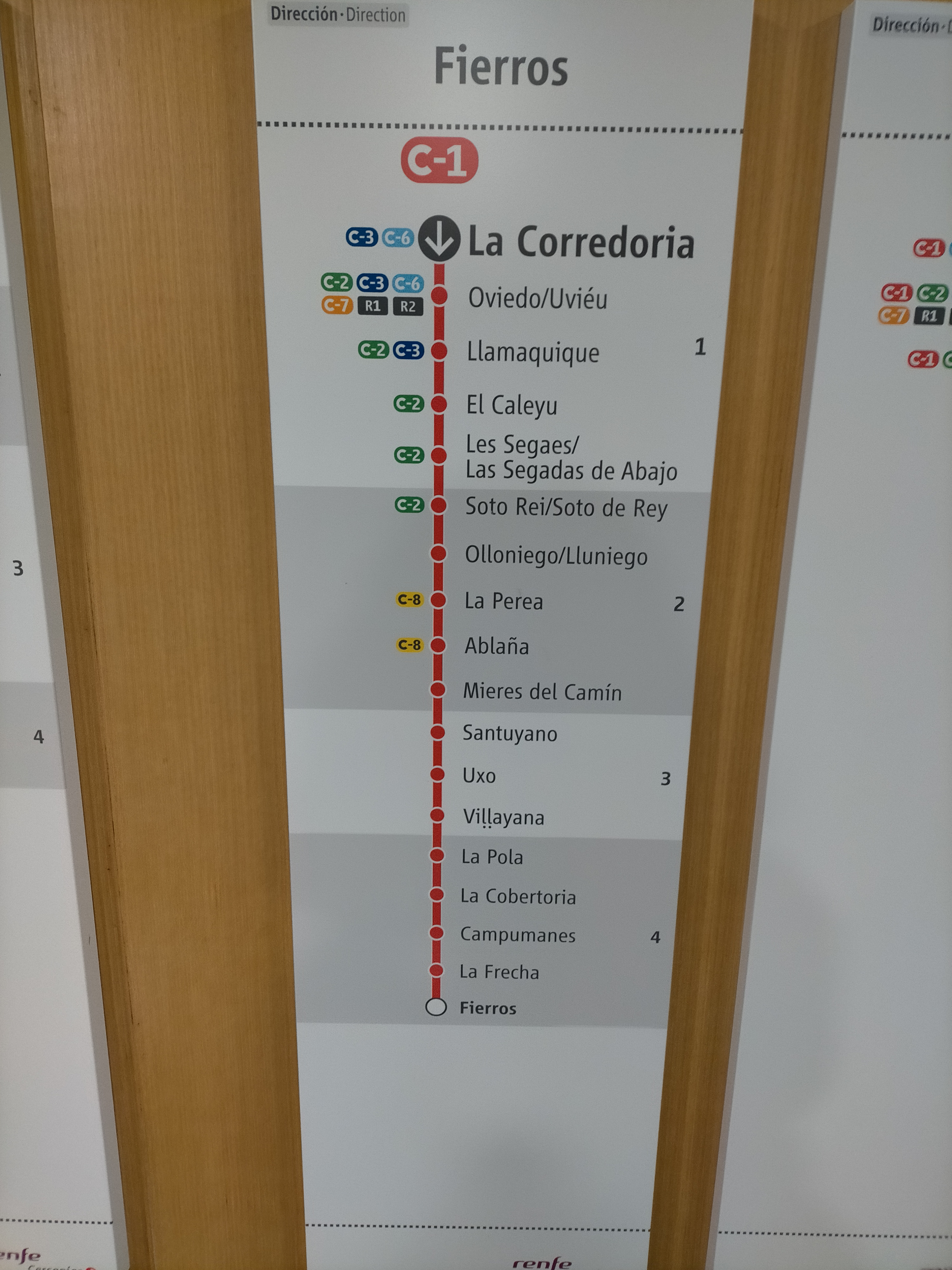
⟨ḷḷ⟩ used on a sign in Cercanías Asturies as part of the place name Viḷḷayana

In the standard Asturian orthography published by the Academy of the Asturian Language in 1981, ⟨ll⟩ represents the phoneme /ʎ/ (palatal lateral approximant).

A variation of this digraph, ⟨l-l⟩, is used to separate a verb form that ends in -l and the enclitics lu, la, lo, los or les. This is pronounced as a geminated ⟨l⟩ /ll/. For example, val-lo ("it is worth it").

Another variation of this digraph, ⟨ḷḷ⟩, is used to represent a set of dialectal phonemes used in Western Asturian that correspond to /ʎ/ in other dialects: [ɖ] (voiced retroflex plosive), [ɖʐ] (voiced retroflex affricate), [ʈʂ] (voiceless retroflex affricate) or [t͡s] (voiceless alveolar affricate). This may also be written as ⟨l.l⟩ in devices that do not support the Unicode characters U+1E36 Ḷ LATIN CAPITAL LETTER L WITH DOT BELOW and U+1E37 ḷ LATIN SMALL LETTER L WITH DOT BELOW.

=== Catalan ===
In Catalan, ⟨ll⟩ represents the phoneme /ʎ/, as in llengua (language, tongue), enllaç (linkage, connection), or coltell (knife).

==== L with middle dot ====
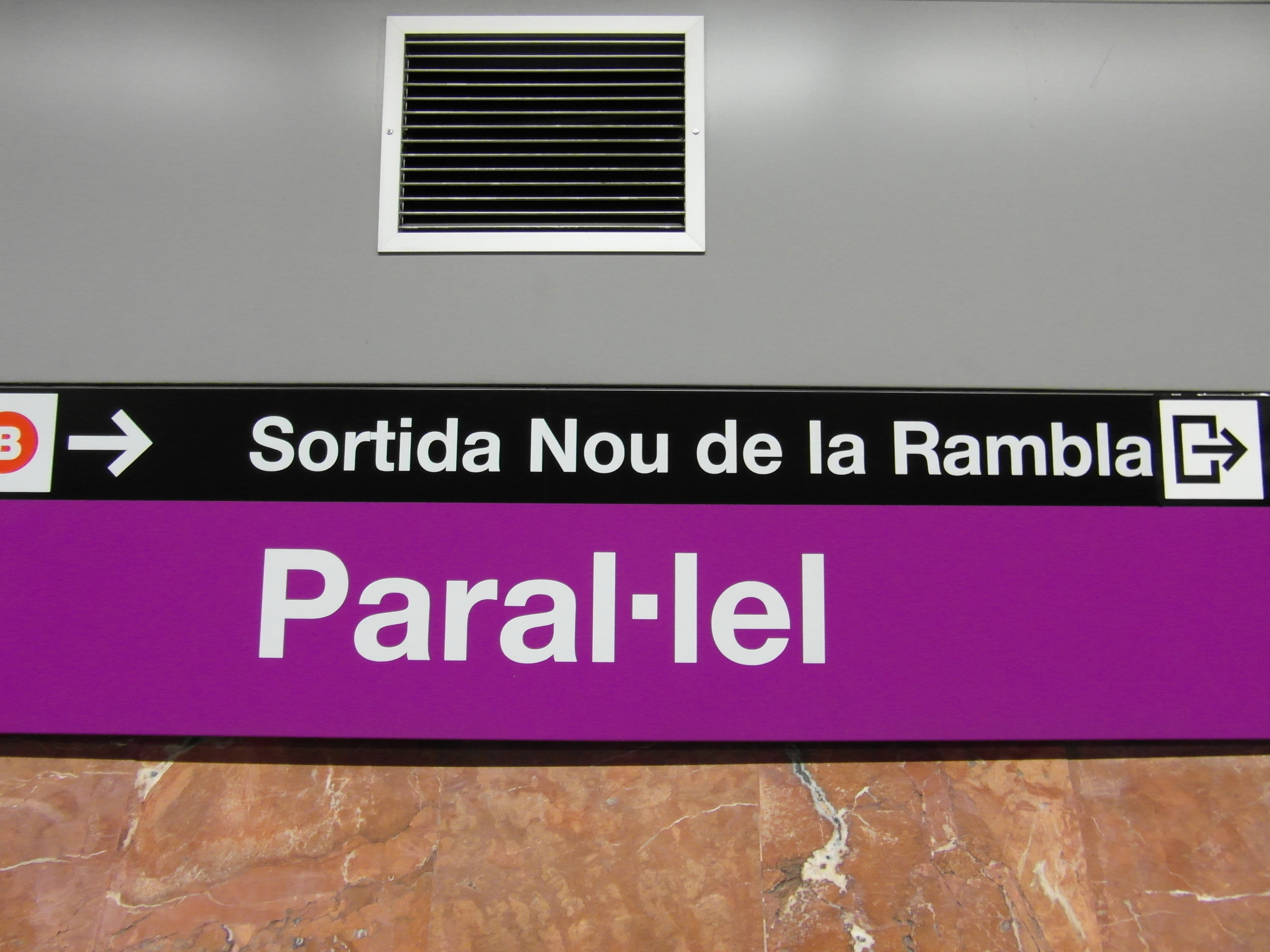
⟨ŀl⟩ used on a sign at the Paral·lel station in Barcelona

Latin Ll digraph with middle dot

In order to not confuse ⟨ll⟩ /ʎ/ with a geminated ⟨l⟩ /ll/, Catalan uses a middle dot (interpunct or punt volat in Catalan) in between ⟨ŀl⟩. For example exceŀlent ("excellent"). The first character in the digraph, ⟨Ŀ⟩ and ⟨ŀ⟩, is included in the Latin Extended-A Unicode block at U+013F (uppercase) and U+0140 (lowercase) respectively.

In Catalan typography, ⟨ŀl⟩ is intended to fill two spaces, not three, so the interpunct is placed in the narrow space between the two ⟨l⟩s: ⟨ĿL⟩ and ⟨ŀl⟩. However, it is common to write ⟨L·L⟩ and ⟨l·l⟩, occupying three spaces. ⟨L.L⟩ and ⟨l.l⟩, although sometimes seen, are incorrect.

=== Galician ===
In official Galician spelling the ⟨ll⟩ combination stands for the phoneme /ʎ/ (palatal lateral approximant, a palatal counterpart of /l/).

=== Spanish ===
ʎ
ʝ

In Spanish, ⟨ll⟩ was considered from 1754 to 2010 the fourteenth letter of the Spanish alphabet because of its representation of a palatal lateral articulation consonant phoneme (as defined by the Royal Academy of the Spanish Language).

- The digraph is called elle, pronounced [ˈeʎe], [ˈeʝe], etc. in different dialects.
- The letter was collated after ⟨l⟩ as a separate entry from 1803 until April 1994 when the X Congress of the Association of Spanish Language Academies adopted standard Latin alphabet collation rules. Since then, the digraph ⟨ll⟩ has been considered a sequence of two characters. (A similar situation occurred with the Spanish-language digraph ch.)
- Hypercorrection leads some to wrongly capitalize ⟨ll⟩ as a single letter, as with the Dutch IJ, for example *LLosa instead of Llosa. In handwriting, ⟨Ll⟩ is written as a ligature of two ⟨l⟩s, with distinct uppercase and lowercase forms.
- Today, most Spanish speakers pronounce ⟨ll⟩ and ⟨y⟩ as the same sound, a phenomenon called yeísmo. In much of the Spanish-speaking Americas, and in many regions of Spain, ⟨ll⟩ and ⟨y⟩ are pronounced [ʝ] (voiced palatal fricative); speakers in Colombia and Tabasco, Mexico, as well as Rioplatense speakers in both Argentina and Uruguay, pronounce ⟨ll⟩ and ⟨y⟩ as [ʒ] (voiced postalveolar fricative) or [ʃ] (voiceless postalveolar fricative). The original pronunciation of ⟨ll⟩ —the phoneme /ʎ/ (palatal lateral approximant)— still exists in northern Spain (mostly in rural areas) and in Andes Mountains. In parts of Colombia and in the Andean regions of Ecuador, ⟨ll⟩ is pronounced [ʒ] but ⟨y⟩ is pronounced [ʝ].

== Philippine languages ==
While Philippine languages like Tagalog and Ilocano write ⟨ly⟩ or ⟨li⟩ when spelling Spanish loanwords, ⟨ll⟩ still survives in proper nouns. However, the pronunciation of ⟨ll⟩ is simply [lj] rather than [ʎ]. Hence the surnames Llamzon, Llamas, Padilla, Bellen, Basallote and Villanueva are respectively pronounced [ljɐmˈzon]/[ljɐmˈson], [ˈljɐmas], [pɐˈdɪːlja], [bɪːlˈjɛːn], [bɐsɐlˈjotɛ] and [ˌbɪːljanuˈwɛːba]/[ˌvɪːljanuˈwɛːva].

Furthermore, in Ilocano ⟨ll⟩ represents a geminate alveolar lateral approximant /lː/, like in Italian.

== Icelandic ==
In Icelandic, the ⟨ll⟩ can represent [tɬ] (similar to a voiceless alveolar lateral affricate), [ɬ] or [l] depending on which letters surround it. [tɬ] appears in fullur ("full", masculine), [ɬ] appears in fullt ("full", neuter), and [l] appears in fulls ("full", neuter genitive). The geographical name Eyjafjallajökull includes the [tɬ] sound twice.

=== Broken L ===
In Old Icelandic, the broken L ligature appears in some instances, such as vꜹꝇum (field) and oꝇo (all). It takes the form of a lowercase ⟨l⟩ with the top half shifted to the left, connected to the lower half with a thin horizontal stroke. This ligature is encoded in the Latin Extended-D Unicode block at U+A746 (uppercase) and U+A747 (lowercase), displaying as Ꝇ and ꝇ respectively.

== Other languages ==
In Albanian, ⟨L⟩ stands for the sound /l/, while ⟨Ll⟩ is pronounced as the velarized sound /ɫ/.

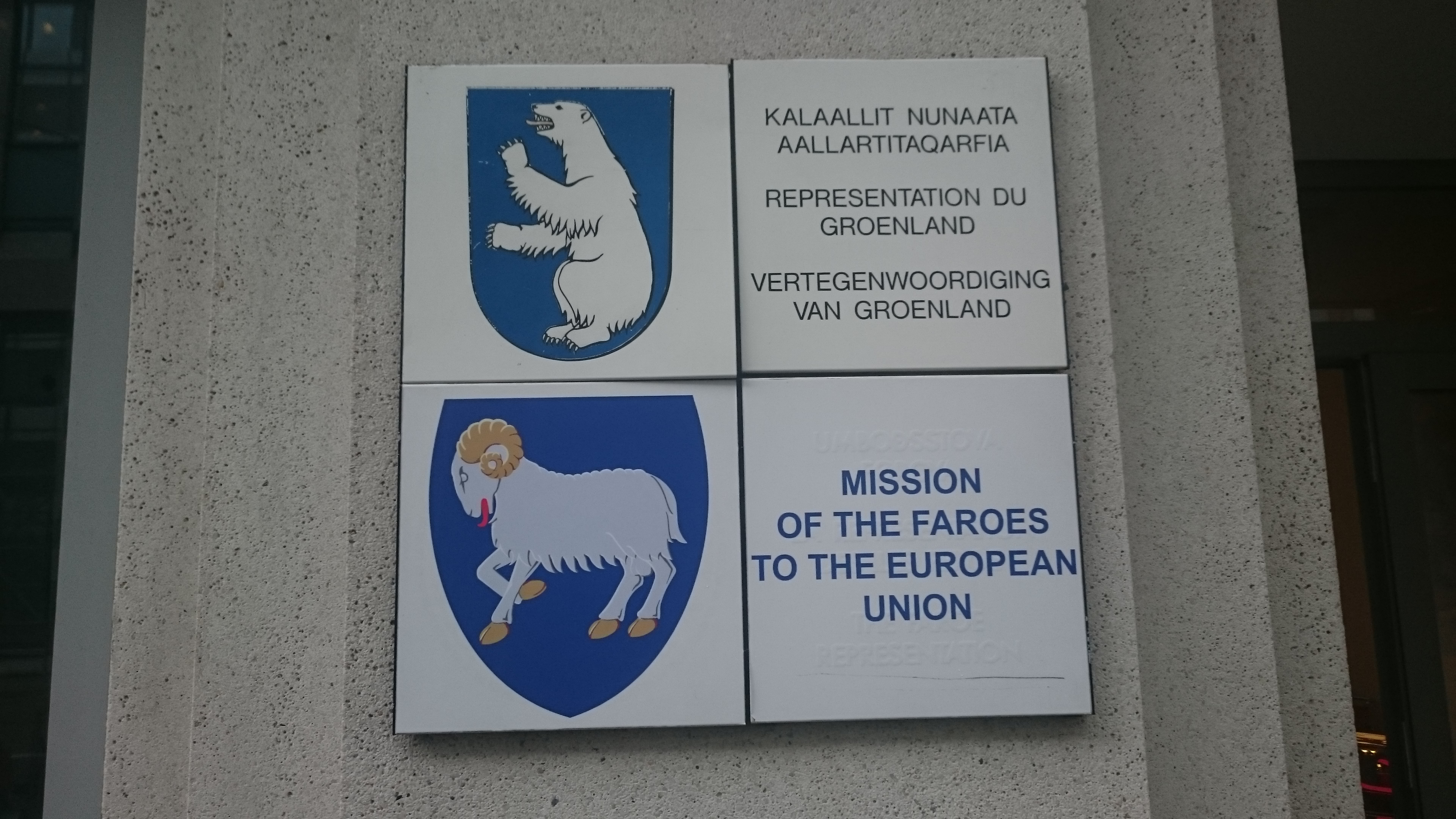
⟨LL⟩ appearing in Greenlandic text. The text reads Kalaallit nunaata aallartitaqarfia.

In Central Alaskan Yupʼik and the Greenlandic language, ⟨ll⟩ stands for /ɬː/.

In the Gwoyeu Romatzyh romanization of Standard Mandarin, the final ⟨-ll⟩ indicates a falling tone on a syllable ending in /ɚ/.

In Haida (Bringhurst orthography), ⟨ll⟩ is glottalized /ˀl/.

== See also ==
- Lh (digraph)
- Lj (digraph)
- Hungarian ly
