= José Antonio de Lavalle y Pardo =

Peruvian politician (1858–1918)

Deputy for Moyobamba
- In office July 28, 1907 – December 23, 1912

Minister of Justice, Instruction and Worship
- In office November 25, 1897 – March 16, 1898
- President: Nicolás de Piérola

Personal details
- Born: January 1, 1858 Lima, Peru
- Died: February 9, 1918 (aged 60) Lima, Peru
- Children: José Antonio de Lavalle; Hernando de Lavalle; Juan Bautista de Lavalle
- Relatives: José Antonio de Lavalle (father); Mariana Pardo y Lavalle (mother); Manuel Pardo y Lavalle (uncle)

Military service
- Branch/service: Peruvian Army
- Years of service: 1879–1881
- Battles/wars: War of the Pacific: Battle of Miraflores

José Antonio de Lavalle y Pardo was a Peruvian lawyer and politician.

== Biography ==
He was born in Lima on January 1, 1858. His father was the diplomat José Antonio de Lavalle y Arias de Saavedra, who participated in the Lavalle Mediation before the War of the Pacific. His mother was Mariana Pardo y Lavalle, sister of President Manuel Pardo y Lavalle. On December 16, 1886, he married Rosalía García Delgado with whom he had five children, including José Antonio de Lavalle y García and Juan Bautista de Lavalle y García. He completed his studies in Europe and finished them at the University of San Marcos.

He fought in the War of the Pacific, joining the reserves of the Peruvian Army and later being part of the battle of Miraflores during the defense of Lima.

During the second government of Nicolás de Piérola, he was appointed Minister of Justice, Instruction and Worship between November 1897 and March 1998, forming part of the cabinets of José Antonio de Lavalle y García and Juan Bautista de Lavalle y García.

In 1907 he was elected deputy for the province of Moyobamba. He served in office during the first governments of José Pardo y Barreda and Augusto B. Leguía. In addition to this, he was Minister of Justice and prosecutor of the Supreme Court.

He died in Lima on February 9, 1918.
