= Vargas Llosa (surname) =

Surname

Vargas Llosa is the surname of two prominent Peruvian intellectuals who are father and son.

- Mario Vargas Llosa, 1st Marquess of Vargas Llosa (1936–2025) was a novelist, journalist, politician and essayist, winner of the Nobel Prize for Literature 2010.
- Álvaro Vargas-Llosa, 2nd Marquess of Vargas Llosa (born 1966) is a writer and political commentator on international affairs.

Although the name appears to consist of a first name, a middle name and a last name, Vargas Llosa is in fact the complete surname (Spanish-speaking countries use a paternal last name followed by a maternal last name), and falls alphabetically under the letter V. In a library, bookstore, bibliography or similar place, it is not correct to file the works of either of these authors under the letter L or Ll.

== See also ==
- Marquess of Vargas Llosa, a hereditary title in the Spanish nobility
