= Maria Isabel Sanchez-Concha =

Peruvian screenwriter (1889–1977)

Maria Isabel Sánchez Concha
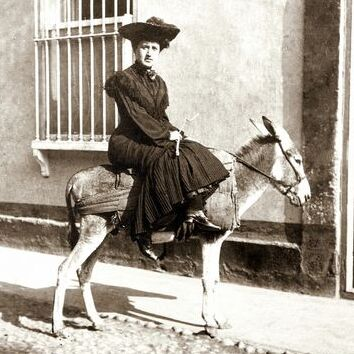
- in 1898
- Born: 29 June 1889; Barranco, Lima, Peru
- Died: 1977 (aged 87–88)
- Occupation: screenwriter
- Writing career
- Pen name: Belsarima or Marisabidilla
- Genres: novel and filmscript

Maria Isabel Sánchez Concha Aramburú (29 June 1889 – 1977) was a Peruvian screenwriter for one of the first films made in Peru.

== Life ==
Concha was born in the area of Lima, Peru called Barranco in 1889. She studied at the Colegio del Sagrado Corazón de San Pedro and from a young age showed her literary ability.

When she was fifteen she was involved in the deception of the Spanish poet, and later Nobel Laureate, Juan Ramón Jiménez. José Gálvez, Carlos Rodríguez Hübner and her created a fictional woman named Georgina Hübner and they started a correspondence with the poet. José and Carlos were hoping to get access to his writing and Sanchez-Concha did the writing. Jiménez fell in love with their creation and planned to travel to Peru to meet the young woman. The plan was only aborted by a telegram they arranged via the Spanish consul to the poet, giving him the fabricated news of Georgina's death. Juan Ramón Jiménez later wrote an elegy Carta a Georgina Hübner en el cielo de Lima which was published in his 1913 collection of poems Laberinto.

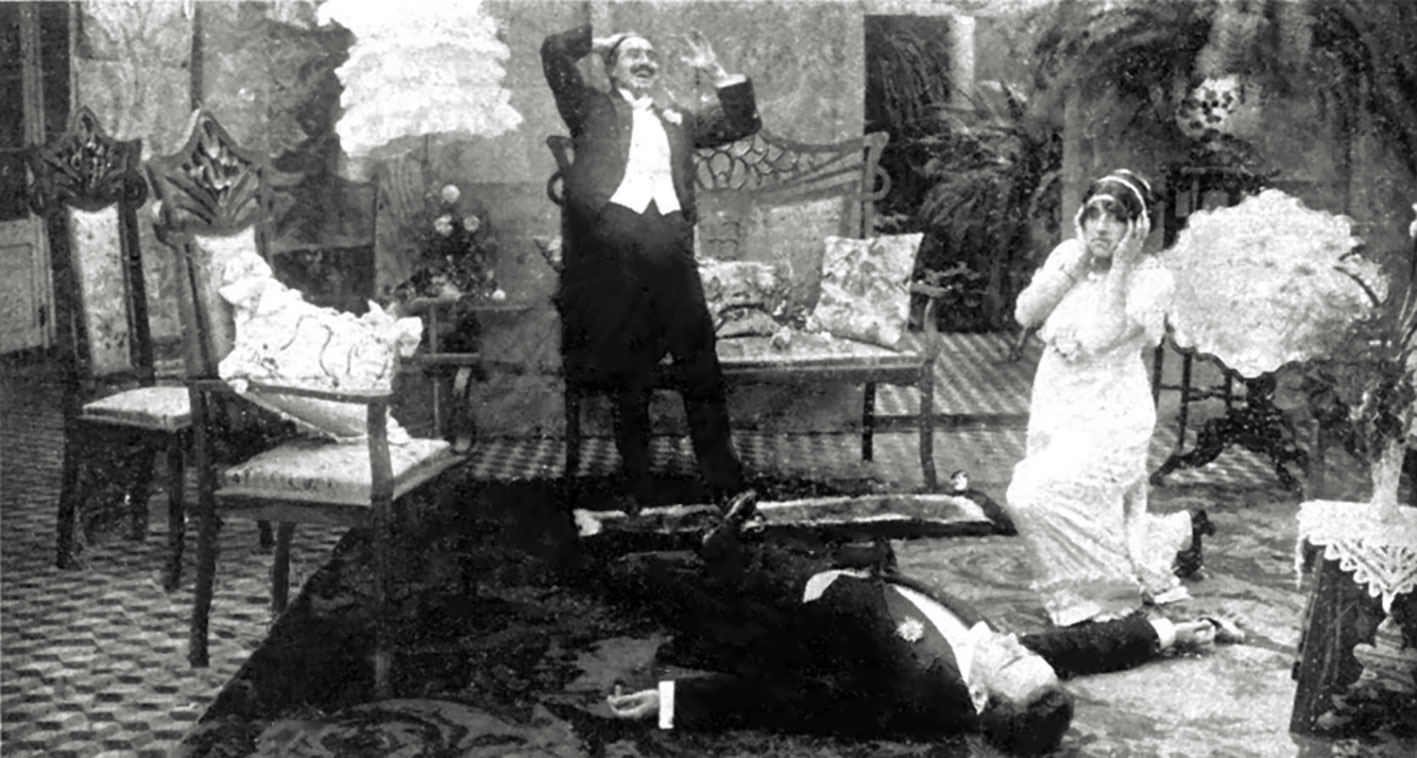
At right, in this still, from her film Del manicomio al matrimonio

She was a member of the local intelligentsia attending meetings and activities that were catalogued, photographed and reported by magazines like La Crónica and Variedades.

Sánchez-Concha continued to develop her career as a writer, using the names Belsarima or Marisabidilla, in the Lima press. In 1913 using the name Belsarima she published her first book, Crónica limeña, with a prologue by the ex-librarian and magazine editor Clemente Palma. She created the script for Del manicomio al matrimonio (From the asylum to marriage) in 1913 which was filmed by Fernando Lund. It was said to be the second feature film made in Peru. She was the screenwriter as well as one of the actresses.

She also participated in the artistic community of Quinta Heeren, where there was a painting workshop for women. In 1924 she directed the segment referring to the history of Peru in the documentary El Perú ante el mundo. El film de La Prensa. These scenes describe the history from the Inca period to Peruvian independence.

== Private life ==
She married Antonio Pinilla who was the Spanish Consul in Peru. In 1927 they had a son, Enrique Pinilla Sanchez-Concha, who became a notable composer.
