= José Antonio de Lavalle =

Peruvian diplomat, writer and historian (1833–1893)

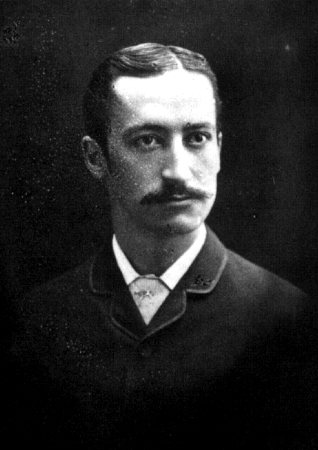

Deputy for Lima
- In office 1860–1866

Minister of Foreign Relations
- In office 1883–1883
- President: Miguel Iglesias

Personal details
- Born: 22 March 1833 Lima, Peru
- Died: 16 November 1893 (aged 60) Lima, Peru
- Children: José Antonio de Lavalle y Pardo
- Relatives: Juan Bautista de Lavalle y Zugasti (father); Mariana Pardo y Lavalle (father-in-law); Manuel Pardo y Lavalle (brother-in-law); Juan de Zavala (cousin)

José Antonio de Lavalle y Arias de Saavedra (22 March 1833 – 16 November 1893) was a Peruvian diplomat, writer and historian. He was Minister Plenipotentiary to Germany, Russia, Chile and Brazil and minister of Foreign Relations. He is known for having led the Peruvian Mission to Chile before the War of the Pacific and for signing Treaty of Ancón.

In the Congress, he was member of the Chamber of Deputies (1860 –1864) and the Senate (1874, 1876 – 1878).

== Biography ==
Lavalle was born in Lima into a prominent family. His father was the soldier and politician Juan Bautista de Lavalle y Zugasti, son of the 1st Count of Premio Real and he himself Count of San Antonio de Vista Alegre, who decided to remain in Peru after the War of Independence and was later Interim President of the Republic. His mother, Narcisa, was the youngest daughter of the 1st Count of Casa Saavedra and the 3rd Marquise of Torreblanca.

When the War of Independence broke out, part of his maternal family remained loyal to Spain and decided to move to Madrid. His uncle Pedro José de Zavala, 7th Marquis of Valleumbroso, become commander of the Queen's Guard and his first cousin Juan de Zavala, 1st Marquis of Sierra Bullones, become Prime Minister. He was also a cousin of the Spanish diplomat José Antonio de Lavalle y Motezuma, 4th Count of Premio Real, on his father's side.

He was educated at the College of Our Lady of Guadalupe. After finishing his studies, Lavalle entered the Diplomatic Service in 1851. He was subsequently attaché to the Peruvian legations in Washington, D.C. (1851), Rome (1852) and Madrid (1853), before he was promoted to Second Secretary to the legation in Chile (1854). Then, he retired from the service and married Mariana Pardo y Lavalle, his cousin and a daughter of the writer Felipe Pardo.

In 1854, Lavalle initiated his journalistic and literary career. At 22 years old, he published his exegetical commentaries to the Peruvian Constitution in El Heraldo de Lima led by Toribio Pacheco. These commentaries were later incorporated to the Proposed Political Constitution presented and published by Felipe Pardo in 1859. That same year, Lavalle published his main literary work Don Pablo de Olavide. Apuntes sobre su vida y sus obras, a historical biography on the life of Pablo de Olavide.

Lavalle founded and published La Revista de Lima among with Pacheco and Ricardo Palma in 1860. This literary magazine was created as a continuation of El Mercurio Peruano and was considered one of the most important of its kind during the three years of its publication.

In 1860, Lavalle was elected Deputy for Lima. Next year, he was elected and then reelected a member of the Permanent Commission of the Congress which acted during the parliamentary recess. In 1864, Lavalle was once again elected Deputy and also Director of the Charity of Lima.

In 1866, after the proclamation of Mariano I. Prado as Dictator and the dissolution of the Congress, he and his family moved to Europe living in France, Spain, England, Belgium, The Netherlands, Switzerland and Germany. While he was settled in London, the Government appointed him Minister Plenipotentiary to Berlin and St Petersburg in 1873.

Upon his return to Lima, Lavalle was elected Senator for Loreto in 1874. By this time, he presumably headed a secret mission before the Chilean government when a controversy arose between this country and the United Kingdom for the imprisonment of a Chilean captain. In 1875, he was appointed once again Minister Plenipotentiary to St Petersburg. In the Russian court, he headed the delegation who represented the Peruvian claim against the Japanese Emperor for the María Luz impasse, which was finally decided by the Tsar in favor of the Japaneses. His experiences in the courts of Berlin and St Petersburg were published in La Opinión Nacional between 1876 and 1877 and recollected in Hojas de un diario and Páginas de un libro que no se publicará published in 1878.

In 1876, he was appointed Minister Plenipotentiary to Berlin, where he remained until 1878 when returned to Peru to resume his senatorial duties. He was Chairman of the Diplomatic Committee of the Congress when the Chilean-Bolivian conflict broke out in 1879. This year, the Government appointed him Special Envoy to Santiago to mediate in the controversy. During his mission he was informed of a secret treaty signed between his country and Bolivia in 1873 and despite his efforts the war broke out between the three countries.

After finishing his mission in 1879, he was appointed Minister Plenipotentiary to Rio de Janeiro. Returned to Peru in 1881, Lavalle was first held prisoner during the Chilean occupation of Lima and then sent to Chile. He received the declaration of surrender signed by a part of the Peruvian staff and was required to negotiate the peace. Released in 1883, he returned to Peru and was appointed by an interim government Minister of Foreign Affairs, signing in this capacity the Treaty of Ancón.

Retired from public life, Lavalle dedicated himself to academic matters. He participated in several literary circles and was one of the founders of the Peruvian Academy of Language and its first director in 1887.

== Family ==
In 1854, he married his first cousin Mariana Pardo y Lavalle, daughter of the writer Felipe Pardo and sister of the politician Manuel Pardo, later President of Peru. His wife died in 1875 in St Petersburg.

The couple had nine children including José Antonio de Lavalle y Pardo (1858–1918), later Minister of Justice and General Prosecutor of the Supreme Court, and Hernando de Lavalle y Pardo, killed in the Battle of San Juan in 1881.

== Main publications ==
- Don Pablo de Ovalide. Apuntes sobre su vida y su obra (Don Pablo de Olavide: Notes on his Life and Work, 1859)
- Proyecto de Constitución Política (Proposed Political Constitution, 1859), written by Felipe Pardo y Aliaga and commented by Lavalle.
- Los Jesuitas (The Jesuits, 1859).
- Negociaciones entre el Gobierno de los Estados Unidos y el Gobierno de S.M. Británica respecto al reconocimiento de la independencia de los Estados Hispano Americanos (Negotiations between the Government of the United States and Her Majesty's Government on the Recognition of the Independence of the Hispanic-American States, 1874)
- Exposición presentada al Emperador de Rusia, árbitro en el caso de la "María Luz", por el plenipotenciario del Perú (Memorial submitted before the Emperor of Russia, arbitrator in the María Luz case, by the Plenipotentiary of Peru, 1875).
- Hojas de un diario. Relatos de un viaje a través de Rusia en 1875 (Journal Pages: Accounts on a Travel Through Russia in 1875, published in the Peruvian newspaper La Opinión Nacional in 1876), republished as Kilka kartek z dziennika podróży po Rosyi in the Polish newspaper Czas of Kraków in 1877.
- Mariano Belzunce (1866)
- El Dr. D. José Manuel Valdés. Apunte sobre su vida y sus obras (Dr. Don José Manuel Valdés: Notes on his Life and Works, 1886)
- Galería de retratos de los gobernadores y virreyes del Perú (1553-1824) (Portrait Gallery of the Governors and Viceroys of Peru, 1891), with drawings by E. San Cristóval and comments by Lavalle.
- Galería de retratos de los arzobispos de Lima (1541-1891) (Portrait Gallery of the Archbishops of Lima, 1892), with drawings by Carlos Fabbri and comments by Lavalle.
- Salto atrás (published anonymously)
- La hija del contador (The Daughter of the Accountant).
- Mi misión a Chile en 1879 (My Mission to Chile in 1879)
