= José Antonio de Lavalle y García =

Peruvian agronomist and horse breeder

OSP José Antonio de Lavalle y García
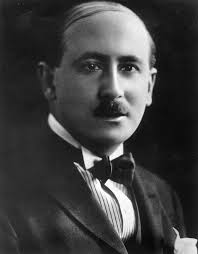
- Born: November 4, 1888; Lima, Peru
- Died: May 17, 1957 (aged 68); Lima, Peru
- Organization(s): National Club; Jockey Club; Regatas Lima
- Awards: Order of the Sun of Peru; Order of Merit (Chile); Order of the Crown of Italy

José Antonio de Lavalle y García (Lima, November 4, 1888 – May 17, 1957) was a Peruvian agronomist and horse breeder. He was the inspiration for Chabuca Granda's song José Antonio.

== Biography ==
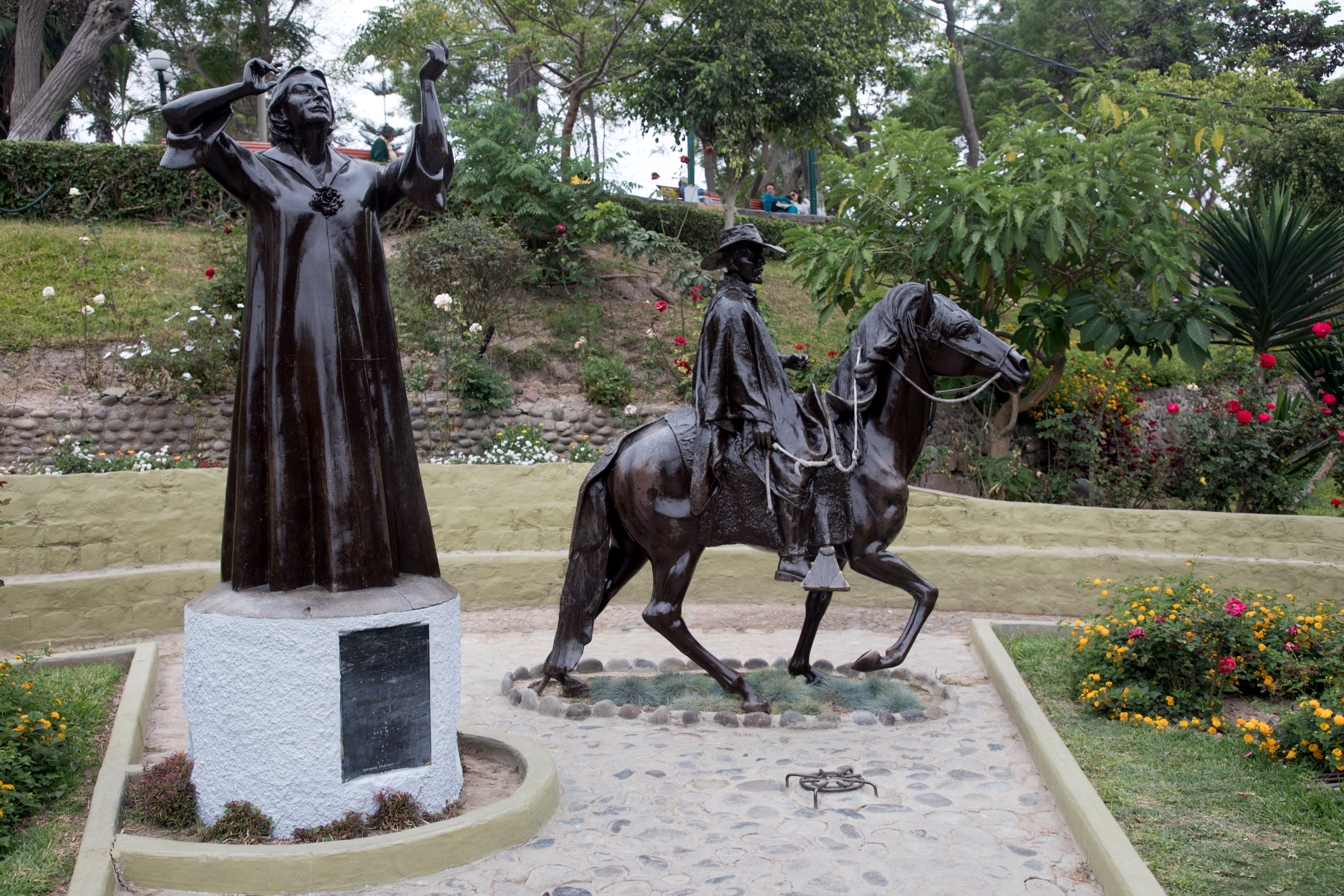
Statues of Lavalle and Granda in Barranco

He was born to aristocratic parents José Antonio de Lavalle y Pardo and Rosalía García Delgado. He was a descendant through his father's family of the counts of Premio Real and Casa Saavedra, both by his grandfather; and of the Marquises of Fuente Hermosa de Miranda, by his grandmother. He studied at the Colegio Sagrados Corazones Recoleta (1897–1903) and then entered the National School of Agriculture, from which he graduated as an agronomist (1909). In 1921, he married Sara Garragori Cebrián, with whom he had four children.

He held various positions in the agricultural and livestock industry: director of the cotton experimental station (1910–1911), general administrator of the Sociedad Ganadera del Centro (1913–1913), head of the Guano Administration Company (1914–1932).

He was a technical adviser to the Secretariat of the Presidency of the Republic, from 1940 to 1945, during the government of Manuel Prado Ugarteche.

A lover and preserver of the Peruvian Paso, he was a personal friend of Eduardo Granda and his daughter Chabuca, who wrote a criollo waltz named after him after Lavalle died in 1957.

He had been a member of the Society of Engineers, the Peruvian Association of Agricultural Engineers, the National Association of Writers and Artists, the National Club, the Jockey Club, and the Regatas Club.

Lavalle died in 1957.

== Selected works ==
- La Industria ganadera en el departamento de Junín. (1911)
- De agronomía nacional. (1912)
- El mejoramiento de los pastos de la sierra del Perú. (1913)
- El guano y la agricultura nacional. (1914)
- Las necesidades de guano de la agricultura nacional. (1917)
- La crisis económica mundial. (1932)

== Ancestry ==
Ancestors of José Antonio de Lavalle y García

8. Juan Bautista de Lavalle
4. José Antonio de Lavalle y Arias de Saavedra
9. María Narcisa Arias de Saavedra y Bravo de Castilla
2. José Antonio de Lavalle y Pardo
10. Felipe Pardo y Aliaga
5. Mariana Pardo y Lavalle
11. Petronila de Lavalle y Cabero
1. José Antonio de Lavalle y García
12. José Antonio García y González
6. José Antonio García y García
13. Josefa García y Urrutia
3. Rosalía García Delgado
14. Francisco Javier Delgado y Fernández de la Cotera
7. Rosalía María del Carmen Delgado Muro
15. Tomasa Muro O'Kelly
