= Barranco District =

District of Lima, Peru

Coordinates: 12°8′30″S 77°1′0″W

Barranco
- District
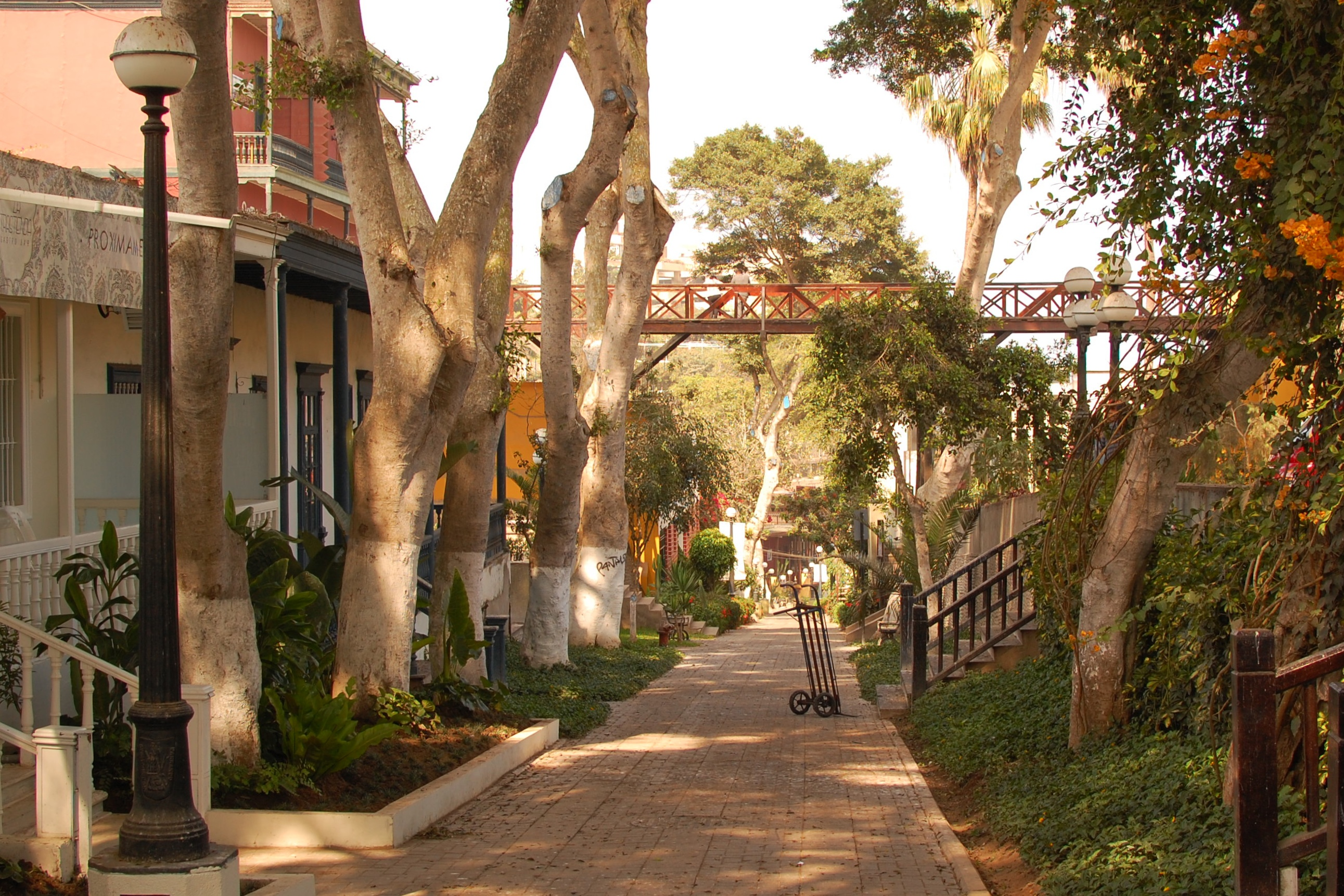
- View under the Bridge of Sighs

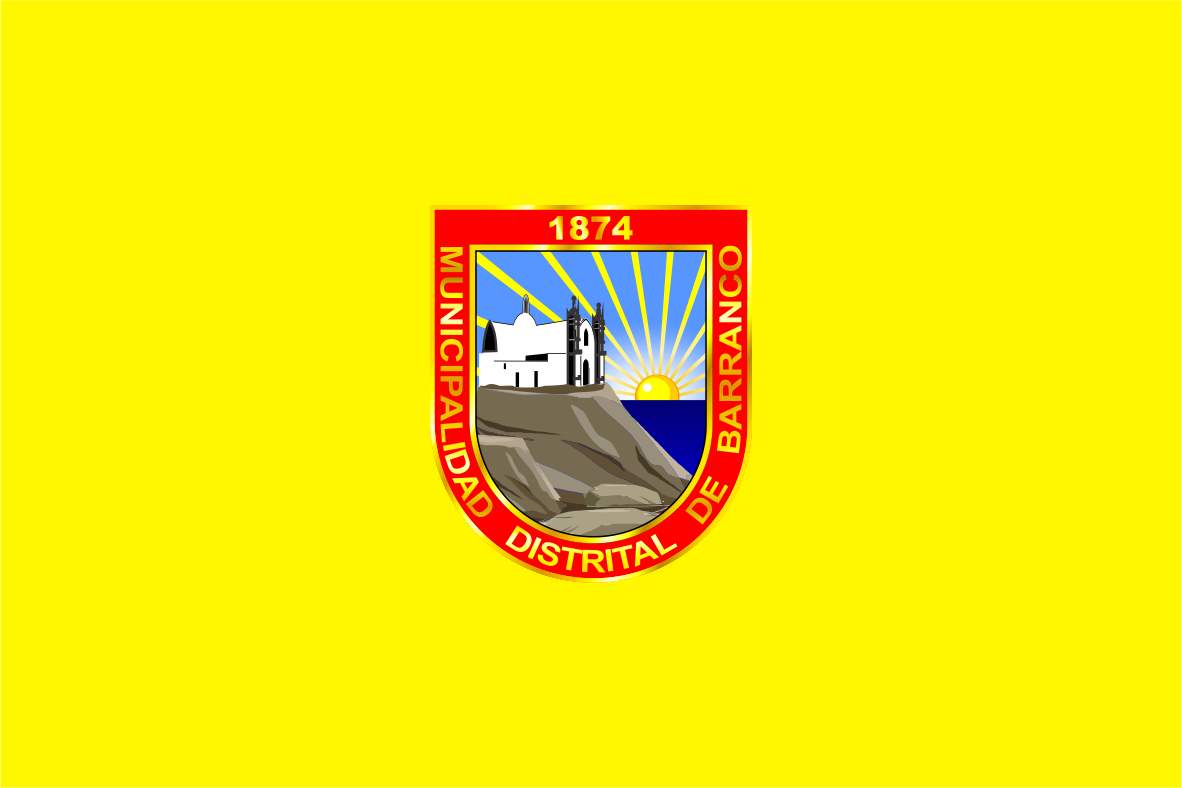
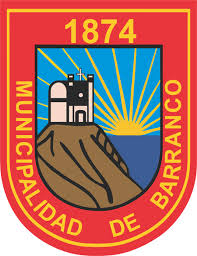
- Flag Coat of arms

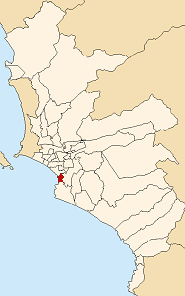
- Location of Barranco in Peru
- Country: Peru
- Department: Lima
- Province: Lima
- Founded: 26 October 1874
- Subdivisions: 1 populated centre

Government
  - Mayor: Jessica Vargas

Area
  - Total: 3.33 km^{2} (1.29 sq mi)

Population (2023)
  - Total: 37,525
  - Density: 11,300/km^{2} (29,200/sq mi)
- Time zone: UTC-5 (PET)
- UBIGEO: 150104
- Website: munibarranco.gob.pe

Cultural Heritage of Peru
- Official name: Zona Monumental de Barrnaco
- Type: Immobable tangible
- Designated: December 28, 1972
- Legal basis: R.S. Nº 2900-72-ED

Barranco (Spanish: [baˈranko]; lit. 'ravine') is a district of Lima, Peru. A seaside district of the city, it is considered a bohemian and artistic centre, being the home and working place of many of Peru's leading artists, musicians, designers and photographers. Its beaches are among the most popular within the worldwide surfing community, and a marina completed in 2008 provides state-of-the-art services for its yacht club.

The Monumental Zone of Barranco (Spanish: Zona Monumental de Barranco) is the designation under which most of the district is administered under a special regime that protects the monumental heritage located in the district. The area, alongside its monuments, forms part of the cultural heritage of Peru. Barranco joined the UNESCO Global Network of Learning Cities in 2022.

== Etymology ==
The name Barranco is Spanish for "ravine". Barranco has two ravines; one in the north where Armendariz Avenue is situated between Miraflores District and Barranco, and one near the central part, the Bajada de los Baños.

== History ==
San José de Surco was founded on 26 October 1874, with the Hermitage of Barranco chosen as its capital. The hermitage's location is traditionally considered the origin of the district, with an 18th-century legend claiming that two Indian fishermen who had become lost at sea managed to find their way to the shore through a light cast by a cross located on the site.

In the 19th century, it was a very fashionable beach resort for the local upper-class (also known as the aristocracy), alongside neighbouring Chorrillos.

The district was officially renamed from "San José de Surco" to "Barranco" through Law Decree No. 19001 of October 19, 1971.

During the 2010s and 2020s, many high rises and other projects began to be built in Barranco as a result of urban renewal, replacing a number of the district's traditional buildings.

== Politics ==
Barranco is under the jurisdiction of its own district municipality, as well as that of the Metropolitan Municipality of Lima.

=== List of mayors ===
Since 2023, the incumbent mayor is Jessica Vargas.

№	Mayor	Party	Term	
№	Mayor	Party	Begin	End
1	Pedro Bustamante y García	—N/a	1874	1874
2	Francisco García Monterroso		1875	1878
3	Benito Bregante		1879	1880
4	Alberto Lajon		1881	1884
5	Baldomero Prado de Zela (interim)		?	?
6	José Tiravanti (interim)		1887?	?
7	Manuel Checa (interim)		?	?
8	Juan Francisco Pazos Monasis		1887	1891
9	José Cornejo		1891	1893
10	Pedro Elguera		1893	1895
11	Pedro Solari		1895	1899
12	Pedro Swayne – José Mendoza		1900	1901
13	Pedro Heraud		1901	1904
14	Juan Francisco Pazos Varela		1904	1906
15	Aurelio Souza		1906	1912
16	Pedro de Osma y Pardo		1912	1914
17	Catalina Miranda		1914	1916
18	Pedro de Osma Gildemeister		1917	1919
19	Cesar Morelli		1920	1920
20	Enrique de las Casas		1920	1927
21	Pedro Martinto		1927	1930
22	Ignacio Brandariz		1930	1932
23	César Contreras		1932	1933
24	Enrique A. Coloma		1934	1935
25	Tomás A. Valeza		1935	1938
26	Germán Noriega del Valle		1938	1940
27	Manuel Montero Bernales		1940	1947
28	Javier Lanfranco		1947	1948
29	Luís Brambilla Tosso		1948	1949
30	Leopoldo Luna Ferrecio		1949	1950
31	Alfonso Ballón Elguera		1950	1952
32	Jorge Souza Miranda, Jr		1953	1955
33	Estuardo Núñez Hague		1956	1956
34	Manuel Campodónico Quevedo		1956	1962
35	Fernando Giuffa Fontanes		1962	1963
36	Jorge Rocha Arnao	AP–DC	1964	1966
37	Héctor Vega León	AP–DC	1967	1969
38	Tomas Paso Valles		1970	1975
39	Carlos Varela Morales		1975	1976
40	Renato Lectora Ginetti		1976	1979
41	Emilio Gordillo Angulo		1979	1980
42	Miguel Lora Arbulú		June 1980	December 1980
43	Nicodemes Montalván Prado	Acción Popular	1981	1983
44	Jorge del Castillo Gálvez	APRA	1983	1983
45	Danilo Delgado Bedoya		1985	1986
46	Pedro Allemant Centeno	APRA	1987	1989
47	Renato Lectora Ginetti	FREDEMO	1990	1992
48	Carlos Gálvez Martínez	OBRAS	1993	1995
49	Mario Zolezzi		1996	1996
50	Francisco Silva Checa	Somos Lima	1996	1998
51	Josefina Estrada de Capriata	Somos Perú	1999	2002
52	Martín del Pomar	Unidad Nacional	2003	2006
53	Antonio Mezarina	Restauración Nacional	2007	2010
54	Jessica Vargas Gómez	PPC	2011	2014
55	Antonio Mezarina	APP	2015	2018
56	José Rodríguez Cárdenas	Siempre Unidos	2019	2022
57	Jessica Vargas Gómez	Renovación Popular	2023	Incumbent

=== Subdivisions ===
The district's central area is a designated Monumental Zone since 1972.

Barranco is the site of a lone populated centre that is coterminous with the district:

Code	Name	Region Type	Altitude (MSL)	Population (total)	Housing (total)
0001	Barranco	Chala	97	34,378 (2017)	13,509 (2017)

=== Twin cities ===
As of 2025, Barranco is twinned with the following places:

- Oakland County, Michigan
- Jun, Granada

== Geography ==
Barranco is part of the country's Chala region. It is also part of Lima's Cono Centro, an unofficial subregion of the city.

=== Boundaries ===
The district is bordered to the north by Miraflores, to the east by Santiago de Surco, to the south by Chorrillos District and to the west by the Pacific Ocean.

=== Climate ===
The cliffs of Chorrillos shield Barranco from colder and more humid winds coming from the South. As a result, Barranco has a micro-climate that is warmer and drier than many of the other districts of Lima, which are generally more humid, especially between May and October.

Climate data for Lima
Month	Jan	Feb	Mar	Apr	May	Jun	Jul	Aug	Sep	Oct	Nov	Dec	Year
Record high °F	79	79	79	75	72	68	66	64	66	68	72	75	72
Record high °C	26	26	26	24	22	20	19	18	19	20	22	24	22
Average precipitation days	1	1	0	0	1	2	3	3	3	2	2	0	16
Average rainy days	4	2	3	2	5	11	12	15	13	7	5	3	82
Average relative humidity (%)	85	80	80	85	85	85	85	85	85	85	85	85	84.2
Mean monthly sunshine hours	179.1	169	139.2	184	116.4	50.6	28.6	32.3	37.3	65.3	89	139.2	1,284
Source: Weatherbase (Temperature, precipitation and humidity). and Universidad Complutense de Madrid (Sunlight)

== Demographics ==
In 2017, the district's population was numbered at 34,378 people.

=== Notable people ===
- María Isabel Granda Larco (1920–1983), singer-songwriter and composer, better known as Chabuca Granda.
- Maria Isabel Sanchez-Concha (1889–1977), pioneer film maker.

== Culture ==
Barranco is commonly referred to as the city's foremost bohemian and artistic district, with a pedestrian-friendly layout and a historical tie to many of the country's best-known artists, such as singer-songwriter Chabuca Granda, poet Martín Adán, and writer Mario Vargas Llosa.

A popular Spanish proverb (quien va a Sevilla pierde su silla) has a local variant that refers to the district (El que se fue a Barranco, perdió su banco).

=== Landmarks ===
The Monumental Zone of Barranco is the designation under which a large part of the district has been administered since 1972, in which a number of buildings have been granted UNESCO's blue shield since 2024. Barranco has many houses in the colonial and Republican style (called "casonas"), flower-filled parks and streets, and appealing beachfront areas. A number of high-rise buildings have been constructed in areas surrounding the district's historic quarter, near the district's limits with Miraflores and Santiago de Surco.

Landmarks included in the Monumental Zone
Name	Location	Notes	Photo
Alameda Sáenz Peña		Tree-lined avenue surrounded by a number of 19th-century and early to mid-20th century buildings. An obelisk dedicated to José de San Martín sits at its intersection with San Martín Avenue, and a statue of Mafalda is found at its end near a coastal viewpoint. It is named after Argentine politician Roque Sáenz Peña, who fought for Peru during the War of the Pacific.	
Avenida Almirante Miguel Grau		Named after Peruvian admiral Miguel Grau, it serves as one of the district's main avenues, connecting it with Miraflores and passing through its central park and merging with Francisco Bolognesi Avenue two blocks to the park's south.	
Avenida Pedro de Osma		One of the main avenues of the district. It begins next to Municipal Park and continues into Chorrillos District. A transit line of the former cable car system crosses its western side.	
Bajada de los Baños		Pedestrian promenade that connects the central part of the district with a footpath that descends towards a beach on the other side of the coast's highway.	
Biblioteca Municipal Manuel Beingolea	Municipal Park	Manuel Beingolea Municipal Library was inaugurated on October 1, 1922, under the mayoralty of Enrique de las Casas and during the presidency of Augusto B. Leguía. It was initially inaugurated on the left part of its current premises, moving to Fraternity Park in 1958 and moving to its current building in 1966, forming part of the cultural heritage of Peru. It was given UNESCO's blue shield in 2025.	
Casa Dasso	Av. Sáenz Peña	Private residence dating back to the early 20th century. It is an integral part of Sáenz Peña Avenue's monumental axis.	
Casa De la Puente Wiese	Alameda Sáenz Peña	Built between 1915 and 1920 in an eclectic style as a residence. It also features neo-Moorish and neo-Gothic ornaments in its façade. It currently functions as a contemporary art gallery. It was given UNESCO's blue shield in 2025.	—N/a
Casa Ferrand Zavala	Jirón Cajamarca	Private residence built in 1911 using adobe and wood. It has since been preserved as a representative building of its time period, and was given UNESCO's blue shield in 2025.	—N/a
Casa Miró Quesada	Al. Sáenz Peña & Av. San Martín	The building dates back to 1914, and was designed by French architect Claude Sahut. It currently operates as the Hotel B, a boutique hotel. It is an integral part of Sáenz Peña Avenue's monumental axis, giving the avenue its historic character. It was given UNESCO's blue shield in 2025.	
Casa Piselli	Jr. 28 de Julio & Melgar	Corner building dating back to 1923, built using adobe and wood. It is currently used by García Bustamante, a law firm after which it is also named. It was given UNESCO's blue shield in 2025.	—N/a
Casa República	Av. Sáenz Peña 208	Built in 1915 and designed by architect Enrique Bianchi, with Moorish and Art Nouveau influences. It was restored in 2009, and currently functions as a hotel and restaurant. It was given UNESCO's blue shield in 2025.	
Casa Rosell-Ríos	Av. Grau 426-428-430	Private residence built between 1909 and 1912 as a summer home for the family of the same name and designed by French architect H. Ratouin (who was possibly assisted by Hugo Behr and Francisco Alva).	
Casa Solari de Checa	Av. Sáenz Peña 136 & Av. San Martín	Private residence commissioned by María Luisa Solari de Checa as her residence and built by Ricardo de Jaxa Malachowski in a Republican style. It was donated to Spain in the 1920s, whose government has since used the building as its ambassadorial residence.	
Casa Zegarra	Jirón Martínez de Pinillos & Pasaje Tacna	Building designed by Ricardo de Jaxa Malachowski dating back to 1923, combining neo-classical, Victorian and Art Nouveau styles. Originally built as a residence, it currently houses a boutique hotel. It was given UNESCO's blue shield in 2025.	—N/a
Iglesia La Ermita de Barranco	Plazuela Chabuca Granda	Catholic church building that once served as the district's capital and cathedral, next to the Bridge of Sighs, and has been closed since 1974 due to the damages caused by that year's earthquake.	
Mirador Catalina Recavarren	Bajada de los Baños	Scenic viewpoint located at the end of La Ermita street. It was built in late 1898 under the administration of Mayor Pedro Allemant Centeno (1896–1899). It is immediately surrounded by traditional buildings, which house restaurants and bed and breakfast establishments.	
Municipalidad de Barranco	Municipal park	Administrative headquarters of the district's municipal government. A mural dedicated to singer Chabuca Granda is located to its side, which faces the road that descends toward the Bridge of Sighs.	
Museo de Arte Contemporáneo de Lima	Av. Grau 511	Art museum dedicated to contemporary art designed by Peruvian architect Frederick Cooper Llosa, and built on land donated by the Municipality. It is run as a private non-profit organization.	
Museo Pedro de Osma	Av. Pedro de Osma 421	The former residence of Pedro and Angélica de Osma Gildemeister, it currently functions as a museum with a permanente Viceregal collection in display. It received UNESCO's blue shield in 2024.	
Parque Municipal de Barranco		The district's central park was inaugurated on February 13, 1898, by then mayor Pedro Solari. A fountain with a naiad's sculpture was installed in 1906, and the park was completely remodelled in 1943, giving the public space its current appearance. The district's municipal library, municipal building, and church all surround the park.	
Parroquia La Santísima Cruz	Municipal Park	The damage suffered by the Hermitage of Barranco due to the an earthquake led to a request reaching the city's archbishop, requesting his authorisation to build a new church. This was granted in 1942, with construction works starting in 1944 before being ultimately consecrated by Juan Landázuri Ricketts on June 1, 1963, in a ceremony attended by the church's patrons, siblings Pedro and Angélica de Osma Gildemeister.	
Plazuela Chabuca Granda		Public space named after Chabuca Granda, a 20th-century singer whose works have since been designated part of the Cultural heritage of Peru. It is connected to the other side of the Bajada de los Bajos by the Bridge of Sighs. It houses the district's Hermitage Church, and a monument to Granda and José Antonio de Lavalle y García, a friend of her father who inspired a song named after him. Granda also wrote a song dedicated to the bridge, among other works.	
Puente de los Suspiros	Bajada de los Baños	The Bridge of Sighs receives its name from its the popular tradition that indicated the place as a meeting point for romanctic couples. It dates back to 1876, having been rebuilt after its destruction by Chilean troops in 1881, who occupied the area during the War of the Pacific.	

It addition to the landmarks above, Barranco also has a number of beaches (Los Yuyos, Las Cascadas, Los Pavos, Barranquito, and Las Sombrillas). A marina opened in 2008.

== Transport ==
The district's Pedro de Osma Avenue is served by a scenic tramway route, once part of the broader system that once serviced the whole city and its surroundings. Francisco Bolognesi Avenue is served by a route of the Metropolitano bus system.

== See also ==
- Administrative divisions of Peru
