= El puente de los suspiros (song) =

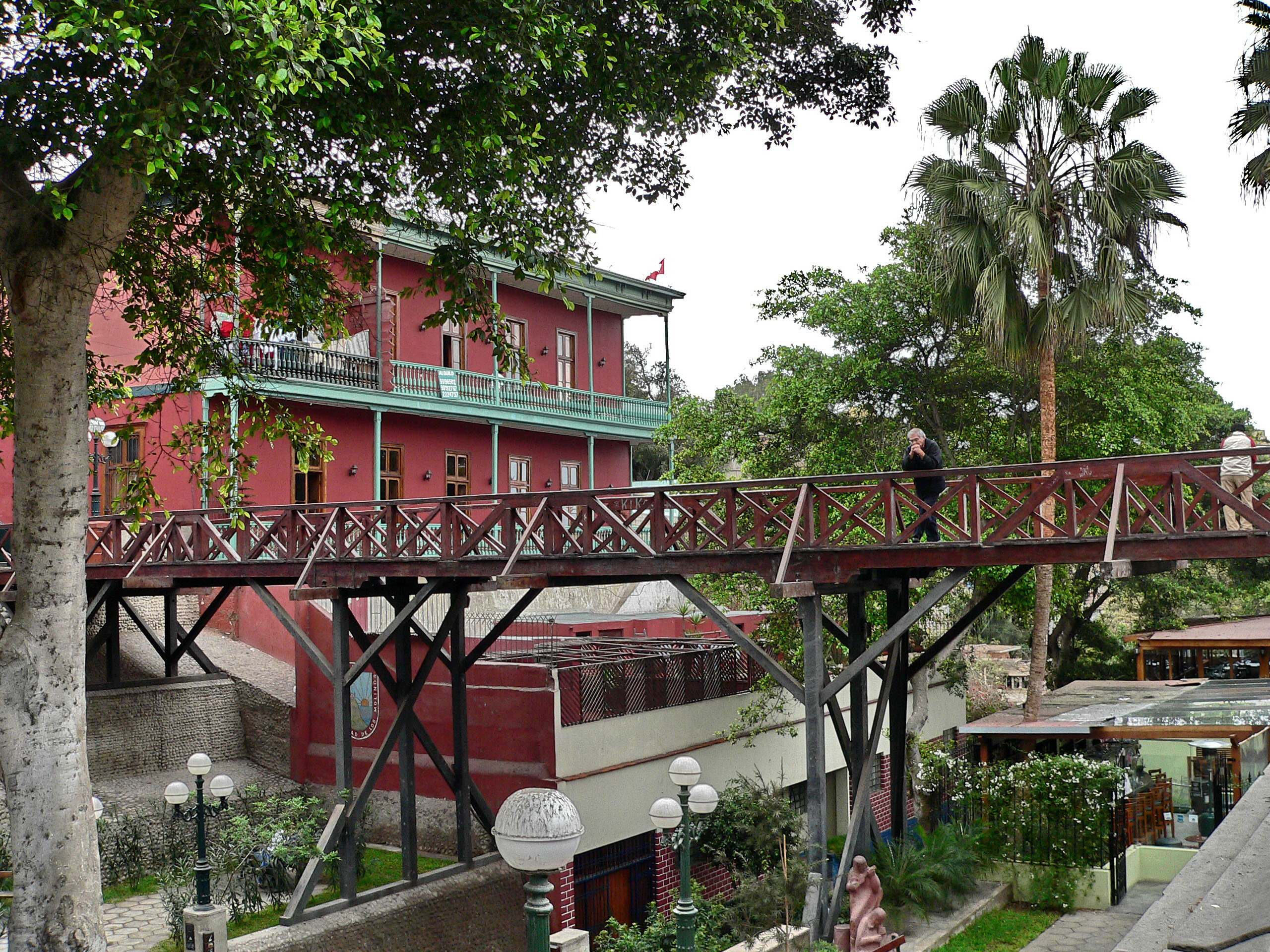

Song by Chabuca Granda
- Released: 1960
- Songwriter: Chabuca Granda

"El puente de los suspiros" ("The bridge of the sighs") is a song written and performed by Chabuca Granda. The song is a Peruvian waltz in the "música criolla" style.

== Composition ==
Granda composed "El puente de los suspiros" in 1960 in homage to a famous wooden bridge over a ravine in the seaside Barranco District of Lima.

The lyrics describe a little bridge hidden between foliage, a sleeping bridge between the murmur of love and embraced by memories, a place of pleasant silence. The song goes on to compare the bridge as a poet who awaits me every afternoon.

The Peruvian poet, César Calvo, was a close friend of Granda. He claimed that it was he to whom Granda referred in the lyrics of the song that say "Es mi puente un poeta que me espera" ("my bridge is a poet who awaits me").

== Recording history ==
The song also appeared on the album, "Doce nuevos valses de Chabuca Granda" (Twelve new waltzes of Chabuca Granda) (Sono Radio, 1966).

In 1967, Granda's international reputation grew following tours of the United States and South America. During this tour, she performed at times with singer-songwriter-guitarist Óscar Avilés, and the pair released an album, "Dialogando" (Iempsa, 1968), which included "La puente de suspiros".

In 1968, Granda released an album, "Voz y vena de Chabuca Granda" ("Voice and vein of Chabuca Granda"), on which she sang her own compositions, including "El puente de los suspiros".

In 1973, Granda recorded the song for her album, "Grande De América", produced for the RCA Victor label. For the album's recording of "El puente de los suspiros", she was accompanied by Óscar Avilés on guitar and by Chucho Ferrer on organ. This version was one of four Granda songs included on RCA's 2003 compilation celebrating 100 years of Latin American folklore music, "Lo Mejor del Folklore Latinoamericano: Coleccion RCA 100 Anos de Musica".

The song also appeared on Granda's album, "Cada canción con su razón" ("Each song with its reason") (EMI-Odeon, 1981).

The song is among Granda's most famous and has been covered by leading Latin American singers, including Argentina's Mercedes Sosa, Mexico's Chavela Vargas, and Peru's Eva Ayllón.

Juan Carlos Baglietto covered the song on the 2017 tribute album, "A Chabuca", which was nominated for a Latin Grammy.

== Recognition ==
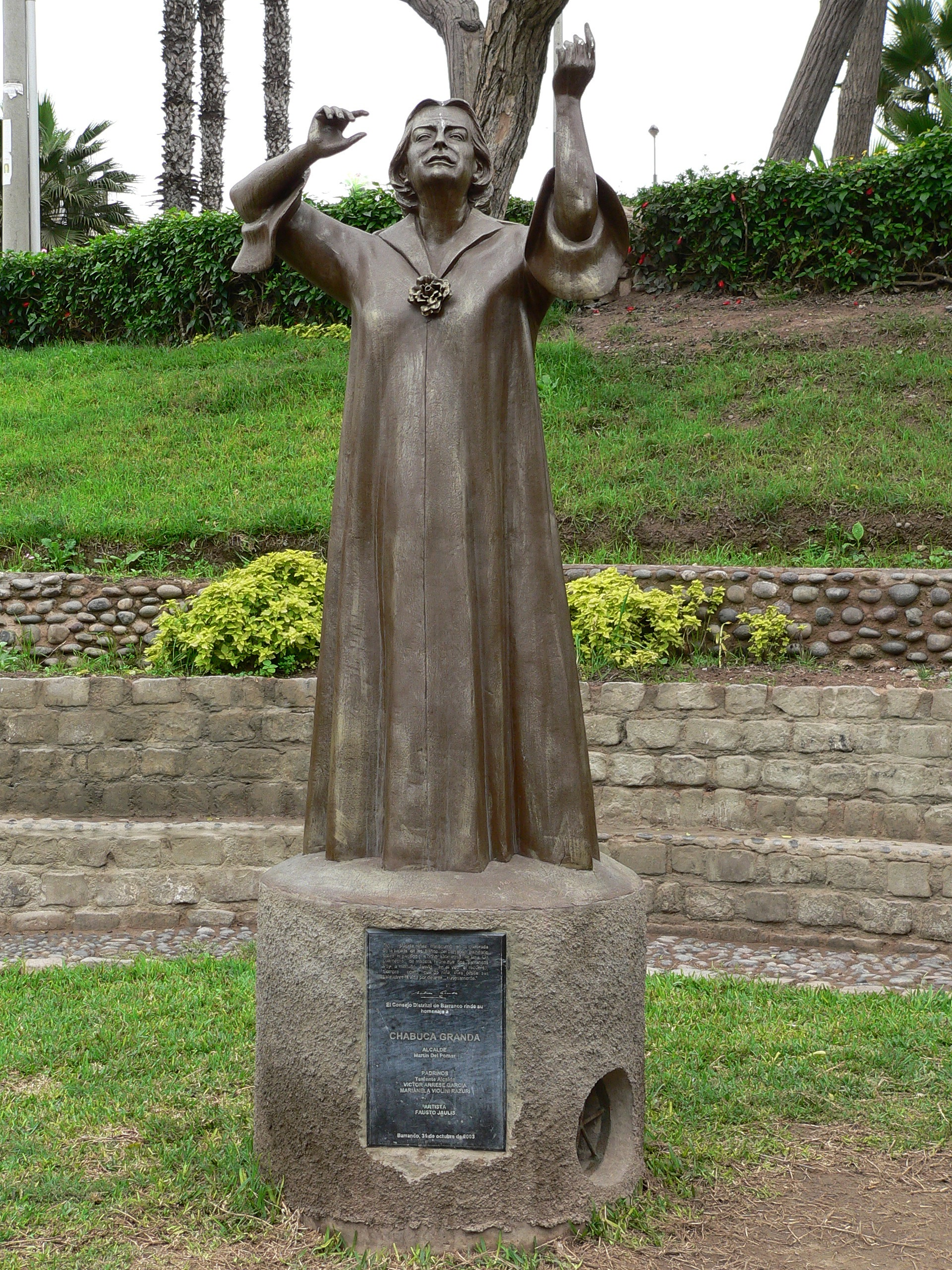
Granda statue in Parque Chabuca Granda adjacent to the Puente de los Suspiros

On the far side of the actual Puente de los Suspiros, the government of Barranco in 1992 dedicated the Parque Chabuca Granda, which includes a statue of Granda.

In 2017, Granda's body of musical work was declared a part of the "Patrimonio Cultural de la Nación" ("Cultural Heritage of the Nation"). "La puente de los suspiros" was one of the emblematic works named in the declaration.

In 2019, La República, one of the two major national newspapers in Peru, published its list of the six best songs of Granda that have represented Peru around the world. The list included "El puente de los suspiros".
