= Frederick Cooper Llosa =

Peruvian architect

- Born: 1939 (age 85–86); Lima, Peru
- Occupation: Architect

Frederick Cooper Llosa (born 1939) is a Peruvian architect and professor.

In 2005 he founded the School of Architecture at the Pontifical Catholic University of Peru, where he was also a professor.

His drawings and models are included in the collection of the Museum of Modern Art, New York. Cooper Llosa was the first South American architect to join the Royal Institute of British Architects as an honorary member.

== Selected projects ==
- Museum of Contemporary Art, Lima (2013)
