= Afro-Peruvian music =

Type of Latin American music

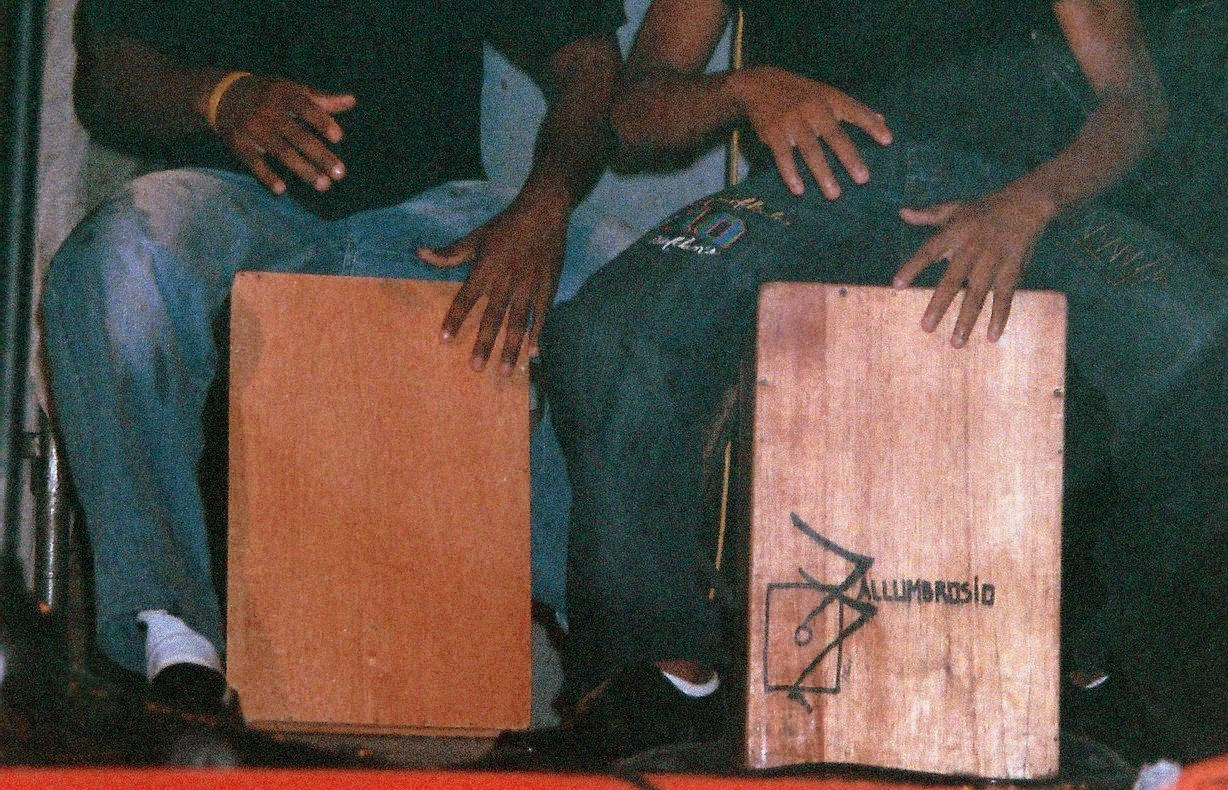
Cajoneros en El Carmen, Chincha, Ica, Perú.

Afro-Peruvian music, African Peruvian music, Black Peruvian Music, Música afroperuana (English: African Peruvian Music), or Música negra (English: Black music) is a type of Latin American music first developed in Peru by enslaved black people from West Africa, where it is known as Festejo. The genre is a fusion of West African and Spanish music that expresses joy and culture while also including elements of Indigenous Andean culture and way of life. The foundations of Afro-Peruvian music were shaped by cultural exchanges, intermarriage, and cultural fusions of colonial Spanish, Indigenous Andean, and West African traditions because of forced migration.

== Instruments ==
Música Criolla includes Spanish-influenced guitar sounds and percussion instruments. Different instruments have been used throughout the evolution of Afro-Peruvian music, demonstrating the blending of Indigenous Andean, European, and African influences and cultures over time, making the genre a combination of musical structures and instruments that changed over time due to different adaptations.

Some instruments include the following:

- Gourds: Large gourds were dried and hollowed out to make different percussion instruments, such as the checo and different kinds of shakers that were typically filled with either seeds, pebbles, or beans to add texture and support rhythms made by the cajón. Before the creation of the cajón, gourds were used to create different rhythmic foundations during colonial times when Spanish authorities banned the use of traditional instruments.
- Quijada: A dried jawbone from either a donkey, horse, mule, or cattle which is struck with a stick to produce a rattling sound from its loosened teeth.
- Cajón: A large wooden box, built with coastal woods, that would be sat on and hit with the hand to create rhythmic beats. The cajón was made using local Indigenous wood techniques that were similar to the ones used to create ceremonial boxes.
- Cajita: A small wooden box with a lid, stick, and a string attached to its side to be worn, a reflection on various Indigenous ceremonial boxes. To create complex beats, the lid would be opened and closed while being hit with the stick simultaneously.
- Claves: Two wooden sticks that would be hit together to create a tempo.
- Quena: A traditional Andean flute made from bamboo or llama bone with six holes.

== Music Characteristics ==
"Afro-Peruvian music" is an umbrella term that refers to the different genres under it; these genres include Festejo and Lando, as well as many others. Festijo is the most well-known genre of Afro-Peruvian music; its musical characteristics are a fast tempo, strong syncopation, and a 6/8 or 12/8 time signature. During the mid-20th century, media exposure and institutional support helped make Festejo the most widely known and publicly recognized Afro-Peruvian genre. Landó, on the other hand, is slower and more expressive, with a 12/8 feel with deeper, more grounded rhythms that emphasize mood, vocal expression, and emotional intensity rather than energetic dance movement.

== History ==
Although much of the original music had been lost, a revival period in the 1950s emerged during a political period where Peru experienced a growth in urban migration and wanted to redefine national culture and invest in folklore as a symbol of identity. The musical revival of Afro-Peruvian music was initiated by various artists and intellectuals who wanted to recover musical forms that had been marginalized or forgotten.

In the 1950s, a revival was staged by José Durand, a white Peruvian criollo who was a folklore professor, and Porfirio Vásquez. Durand founded the Pancho Fierro Dance Company. Drawing upon elderly members of the community for memories of musical traditions, Durand collaborated with Vásquez to revive various songs and dances to create the repertoire for the group. One of the best known is his revival of the carnival dance “El Son de los Diablos.” In colonial times, this dance was featured in parades with a fleet of austere, pure angels leading the way, followed by the mischievous devils. In the revival of the dance, the angels were eliminated, and the crowds were entertained by rambunctious devils and their leader “el diablo mayor.” The dance featured energetic zapateo tap-dancing. The group performed for about two years, including a concert for Peruvian composer Chabuca Granda and a tour through Chile.

Actually, poet Nicomendes Santa Cruz and Victoria Santa Cruz (siblings) both created Cumanana (1957) an Afroperuvian ensemble that highlighted the rich West and Central African call and response poetry, music and dance traditions that were a staple of Peruvian culture and are essentially valued to this day.

One long lasting Afro-Peruvian dance company was Perú Negro, which, incorporated more modern use of percussion combined with criollo music. Perú Negro is also known for their use of blackface, celebrating the mixture of African and Spanish heritage. Two of their best known pieces are “Dance of the Laundresses,” which depicts historical hard working yet beautiful black women in Peru, and the “Canto a Elegua,” which shows tribal religion before the Spanish influence.

Lima, Cañete and Chincha are areas where there are many performers of this music, which is played in night clubs, dinner dances and festivals. Notable artists and groups through the years have included Victoria and Nicomedes Santa Cruz, Ronaldo Campos, Caitro Soto, Lucila Campos, Pepe Vásquez, and Susana Baca. One of the best known songs in the genre is Peru's "Toro Mata".

However, regardless of the reconstructed dances, there are manifestations that did last in time, such as the "Dance of Negritos and Pallitas" practiced at Christmas parties in the towns of the central-south coast of Peru.

== See also ==
- Afro-Peruvian
- Cañete
- Music of Peru
- Música criolla
