= Black Peruvians =

Peruvian of African descent

Afroperuanos (Spanish)
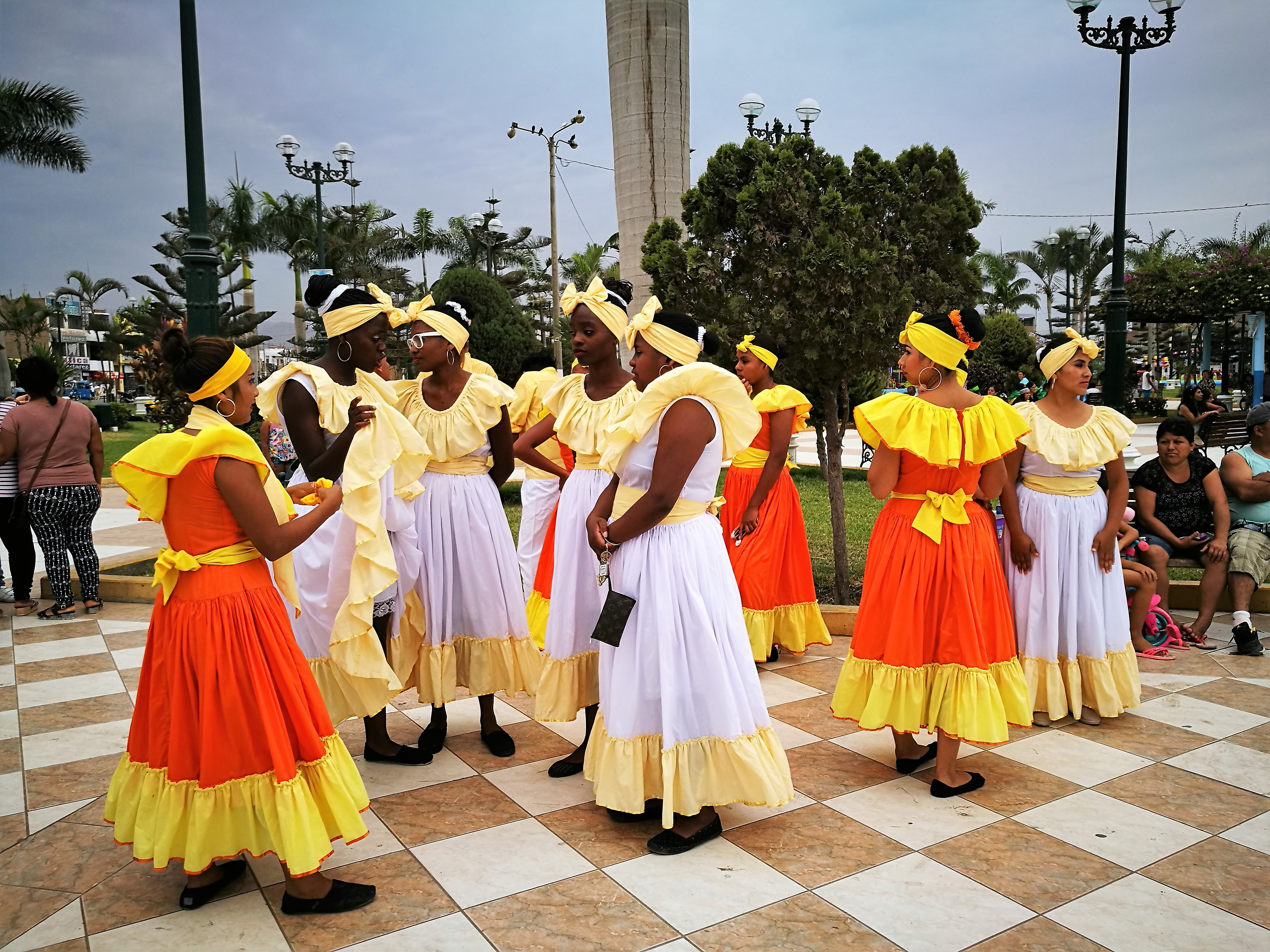
- Afro-Peruvian dancers from the annual festival in Chincha, Fiestichincha. (2017)

Total population
- 828,841 (self-identified in 2017 census) 3.57% of Peruvian population Other estimates: 2,850,000 9%

Regions with significant populations
- Lima, Piura, Lambayeque, La Libertad, Tumbes and Ica

Languages
- Spanish

Religion
- Roman Catholicism; Protestantism, Buddhism, Animism, Other

Related ethnic groups
- African people, African diaspora in the Americas, black Latin American and Peruvian people

Black Peruvians or Afro-Peruvians (Spanish: Afroperuanos) are Peruvians of mostly or partially African descent. They mostly descend from enslaved Africans brought to Peru after the arrival of the conquistadors.

== Early history ==
The first Africans arrived, as enslaved people, with the conquerors in 1521, and some, taken by force, with colonists to work, for no payment, in 1525. Between 1529 and 1537, when Francisco Pizarro was granted permits to import 363 Africans to colonial Peru, a large group of Africans were captured in order to provide, by force, labor for public construction, building bridges and road systems. They also fought alongside the conquistadors as soldiers and worked as personal servants and bodyguards. In 1533, enslaved Afro-Peruvians accompanied Spaniards in the conquest of Cuzco.

Two types of African people were forced to Peru. Those born in Africa were commonly referred to as negros bozales ("untamed blacks"), which was also used in a derogatory sense. These enslaved people could have been directly captured and shipped from west or southwest Africa or transported from the Spanish Indies or other Spanish colonies. Afro-Peruvians previously forced to acculturate to Spanish culture and who spoke Spanish were called negros ladinos ("hispanicized blacks"). Some were mulattos, descendants of Spanish men and African women. People of color performed skilled and unskilled functions that contributed to Hispanic colonization.

In urban areas Afro-Peruvians were cooks, laundresses, maids, handymen, and gardeners. In some cases, they worked in the navy, hospitals, churches and charitable institutions. In 1587, 377 people of African descent worked in the shipyards. The industry included a significant number of Afro-Peruvians working in quarries, kilns and construction projects. There were not enough Spanish workers to build the colony, so Black people essentially kept the economy running. Gradually, Afro-Peruvians were concentrated in specialized fields that drew upon their extensive knowledge and training in skilled artisan work and in agriculture.

In the social hierarchy of the slave stratum, the Black artisans had the highest rank due to their skills. They worked as carpenters, tailors, blacksmiths, swordsmiths and silversmiths. This group enjoyed more freedom than their fellows who worked at large haciendas or in private households. Spanish small-business keepers would dispatch a whole team of servant-artisans to do a job independently and then return to their owner. As the prices for artisans rose, Black artisans gained better treatment and sometimes took a role of a low-ranking employee. Skilled trades were a major avenue of social progress for the Black population. Due to their high skills, Afro-Peruvians gained prestige among Spanish noblemen. They occupied a relatively low social stratum but had some status related to the natives, and were considered above the emerging class of mestizos (descendants of indigenous people and Spanish colonists).

As the mestizo population grew, the role of Afro-Peruvians as intermediaries between the indigenous residents and the Spaniards lessened. The mestizo population increased through liaisons between Spanish and indigenous Peruvians. The elite Spanish developed a caste system based on racial descent and color, to protect their privileges and their Spanish and mestizo children. In this system, Spaniards were at the top, mestizos in the middle, and Africans and the indigenous populations at the bottom. Mestizos inherited the privilege of helping the Spanish administer the country.

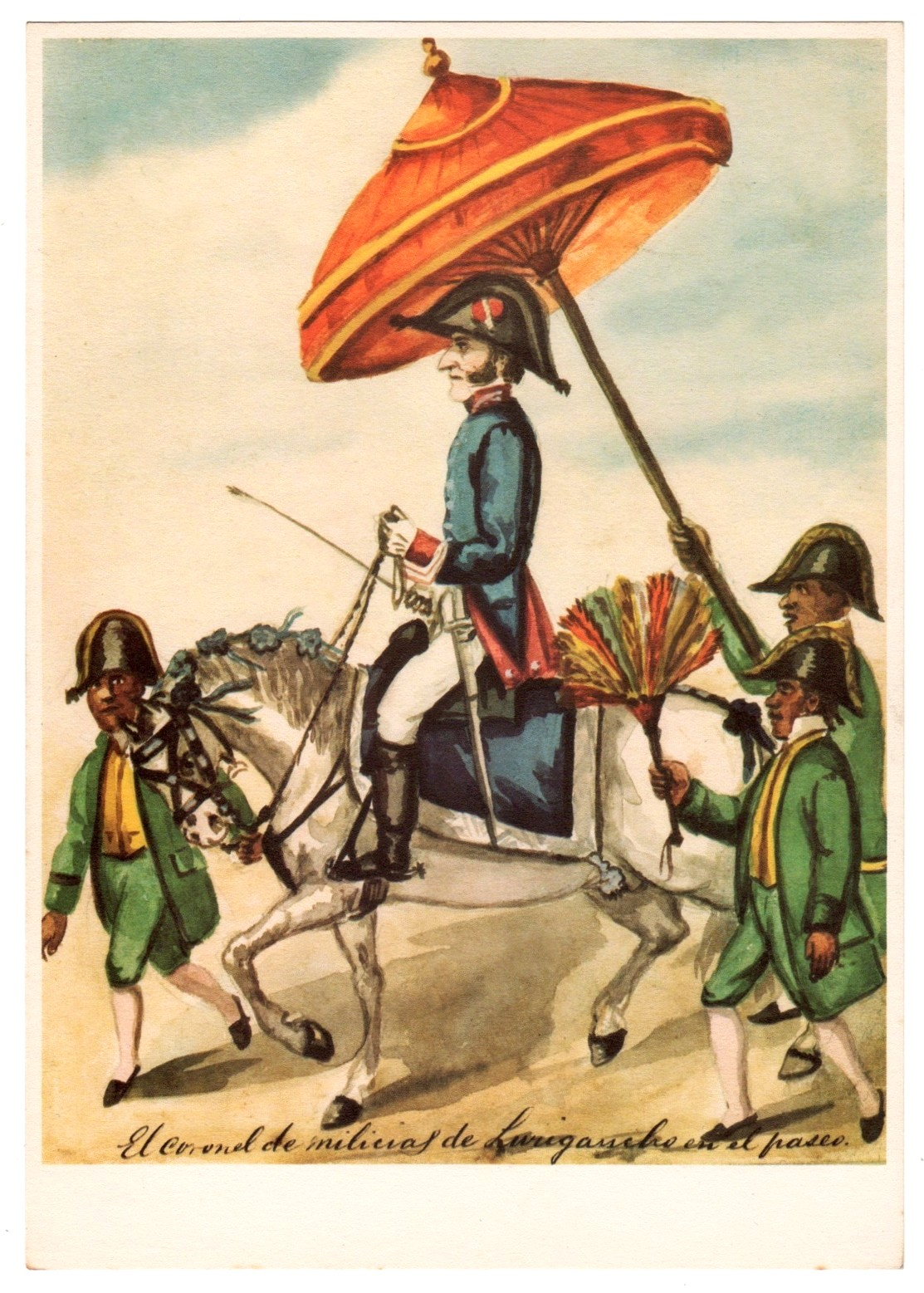
Afro-Peruvian servants in Lima, early 19th century

As additional immigrants arrived from Spain and settled Peru, the mestizos tried to keep the most lucrative jobs for themselves. In the early colonial period, Afro-Spaniards and Afro-Peruvians frequently worked in the gold mines because of their familiarity with the techniques. Gold mining and smithing were common in parts of western Africa from at least the fourth century. But, after the early colonial period, few Afro-Peruvians would become goldsmiths or silversmiths.

In the end, Afro-Peruvians were relegated to heavy labor on sugarcane and rice plantations of the northern coast, or the vineyards and cotton fields of the southern coast. In the countryside they were represented in wet-nursing, housekeeping, domestics, cowboys, animal herding, etc. After indigenous Peruvians became scarce as labor force on haciendas, the people of color gained a title of yanakuna, hitherto assigned only to indigenous servants with full right to own a piece of land and a day to work on it. Afro-Peruvians often exercised agency by using huido (translated as escape, flight) from haciendas and changing masters on their own initiative or joining the cimarrones (armed gangs of runaway enslaved people that formed small communities in the wilderness and raided travel merchants). The indigenous population were used to work in the silver mines, where they had more expert knowledge than West Africans or Spanish, even in the pre-Columbian eras.

== Slave trade ==
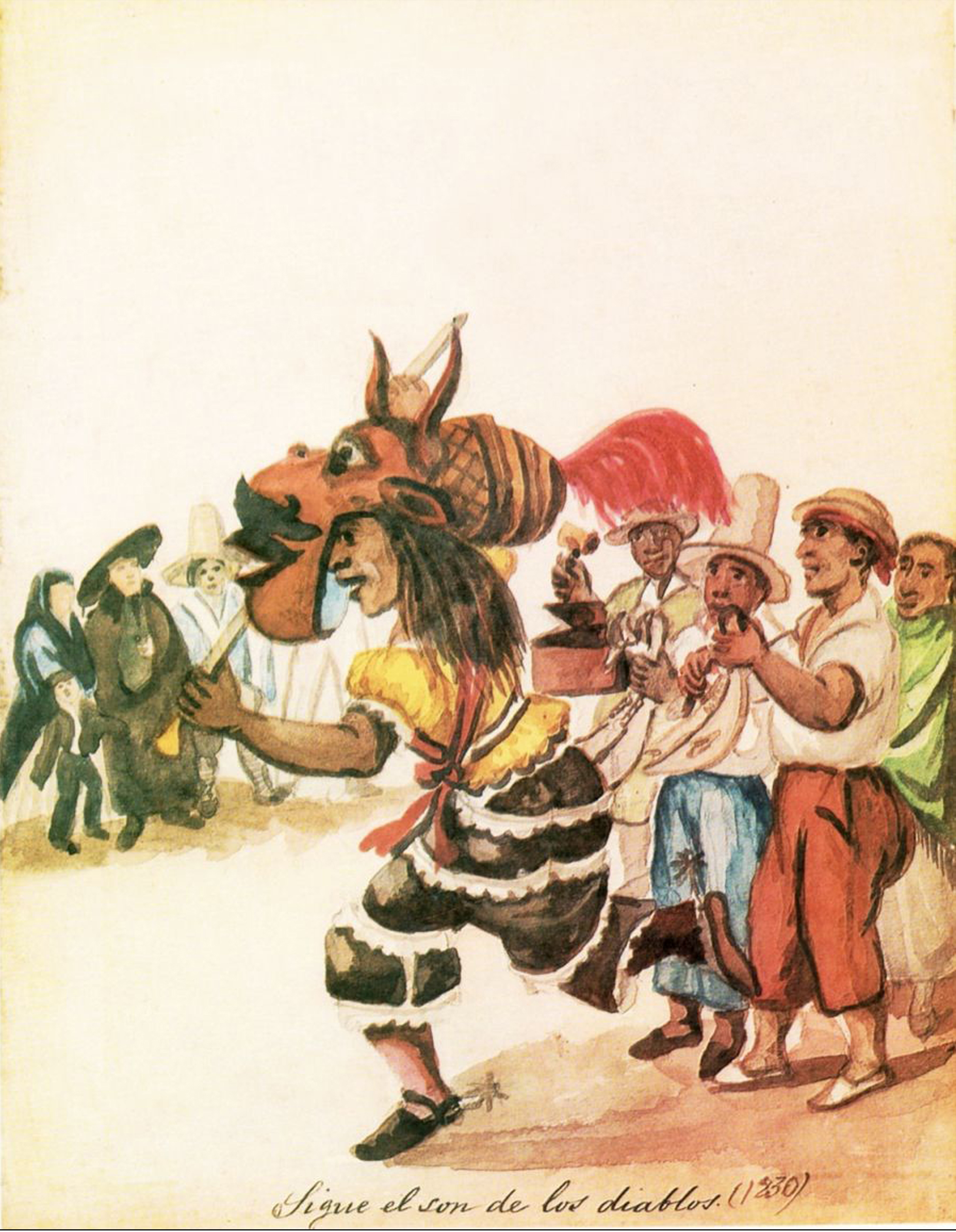
Son de los Diablos, an Afro-Peruvian dance which is based in the Diablada and African rhythms. Painting by Pancho Fierro.

Over the course of the slave trade, approximately 95,000 kidnapped and enslaved Black people were brought into Peru, with the last group arriving in 1850. Often enslaved were initially trafficked to Cuba and Hispaniola, from where traders brought them to Panama and the Viceroyalty of Peru. Planters and others also purchased enslaved people in Cartagena, Colombia or Veracruz, Mexico, at trade fairs, and they returned to Peru with the new enslaved people imported by the slave ships. As a result of the "New laws" of 1548 and the influence of the denunciation of the abuses against Native Americans by Friar Bartolomé de las Casas, slaves gradually replaced natives at the encomiendas.

Enslavers in Peru developed preferences to have enslaved people from specific areas of Africa (believed to have certain characteristics); they wanted to have enslaved people of one area who could communicate with each other. They believed enslaved people from Guinea, from the Senegal River down to the Slave Coast, were easier to manage and had marketable skills. They already knew how to plant and cultivate rice, train horses, and herd cattle on horseback. The enslavers also preferred enslaved people from the area stretching from Nigeria to eastern Ghana. The enslavers third choice was for enslaved people from Congo, Mozambique, Madagascar, and Angola.

In the 17th century some people began the process of manumission of people of color. In some cases, enslaved people were allowed to buy their freedom, and a free Afro-Peruvian social class emerged. Enslaved people had to pay a high amount to buy their freedom; some were allowed to earn money on the side or, if leased out, keep a portion of their earnings. Others raised loans, and some were granted freedom by their enslaver. Even when free, independent Black people were not considered equal to Spaniards. Free people of color enjoyed equal privileges in certain aspects, for instance, there are records of free Africans buying and selling land as well. Freed Black people engaged in various entrepreneurial activities, of which trade was a significant factor. Some people of African descent became owners of shops. But, the status of a free citizen brought new challenges and conditions that a man of color had to face. A freed person of color needed to have a job, was required to pay the tribute, was called to serve in the militia to defend the state. All were under supervision of the Holy Office.

The Crown raised revenues on the freed Black population. A decree that compelled former enslaved people to hire themselves out to and reside with a Spaniard enslaver was another way to limit freedom of emancipated Black people. While some did stay with Spanish in order to save money, the large majority successfully defied the rule and began building "joint communities" to support each other. A discrimination policy with big and long-term impact was the exclusion of Black people and mulattoes from education. Universities and schools largely run by the Church forbade the non-white population to enroll, under the justification that they were "unworthy of being educated". Wealthy, skilled, capable mulattoes however made their way through the political ladder and achieved occupation of minor official posts.

In 1821, General José de San Martín outlawed the slave trade in Peru.

In 1835, President Felipe Santiago Salaverry signed a decree again legalizing the deportation of enslaved people through the other Latin American countries. Thus, two years after his death, will be removed from the constitution the principle of "emancipating soil" according to which an enslaved person entering Peru is, de facto, made free.

In 1854, President Ramón Castilla y Marquezado declared slavery abolished.

Today, Afro-Peruvian communities celebrate the landmark decision of Castilla with a popular refrain:

	Translation
Que viva mi papá, Que viva mi mamá, Que viva Ramón Castilla; Que nos dio la liberta'	Hooray for my Dad, Hooray for my Mom, Hooray for Ramón Castilla; Who gave us liberty

The newly freed citizens typically took the last name of their former owners. For instance, enslaved people in the service of the Florez family named themselves "Florez" or "Flores".

Despite the gradual emancipation of most Black enslaved people in Peru, slavery continued along the Pacific coast of South America throughout the 19th century, as Peruvian enslavers kidnapped Polynesians, primarily from the Marquesas Islands and Easter Island and forced them to perform physical labour in mines and in the guano industry of Peru and Chile.

== Afro-Peruvian music ==
Afro-Peruvian music has its roots in the communities of Black enslaved people brought to work in the mines along the Peruvian coast. As such, it's a fair way from the Andes, culturally and geographically. However, as it developed, particularly in the 20th century, it drew on Andean, Spanish, and African traditions, while its modern exponents also have affinities with Andean nueva canción. As a result, the hotbed for Afro-Peruvian music are the small coastal towns of Chincha and Cañete, not too far south of Peru's capital, Lima. The music was little known even in Peru until the 1950s, when it was popularized by José Durand, Porfirio Vásquez, Nicomedes Santa Cruz, and Victoria Santa Cruz, whose body of work was taken a step further in the 1970s by the group Perú Negro. At an international level, this form of music has had recent publicity through David Byrne's Luaka Bop music label, with the edition of the compilation by the group Perú Negro and the albums by Susana Baca. There are demonstrations that are still valid, such as the "Danza de Negritos y Las Pallitas" developed at Christmas time in the towns of the central coast of Peru.

== Afro-Peruvians today ==
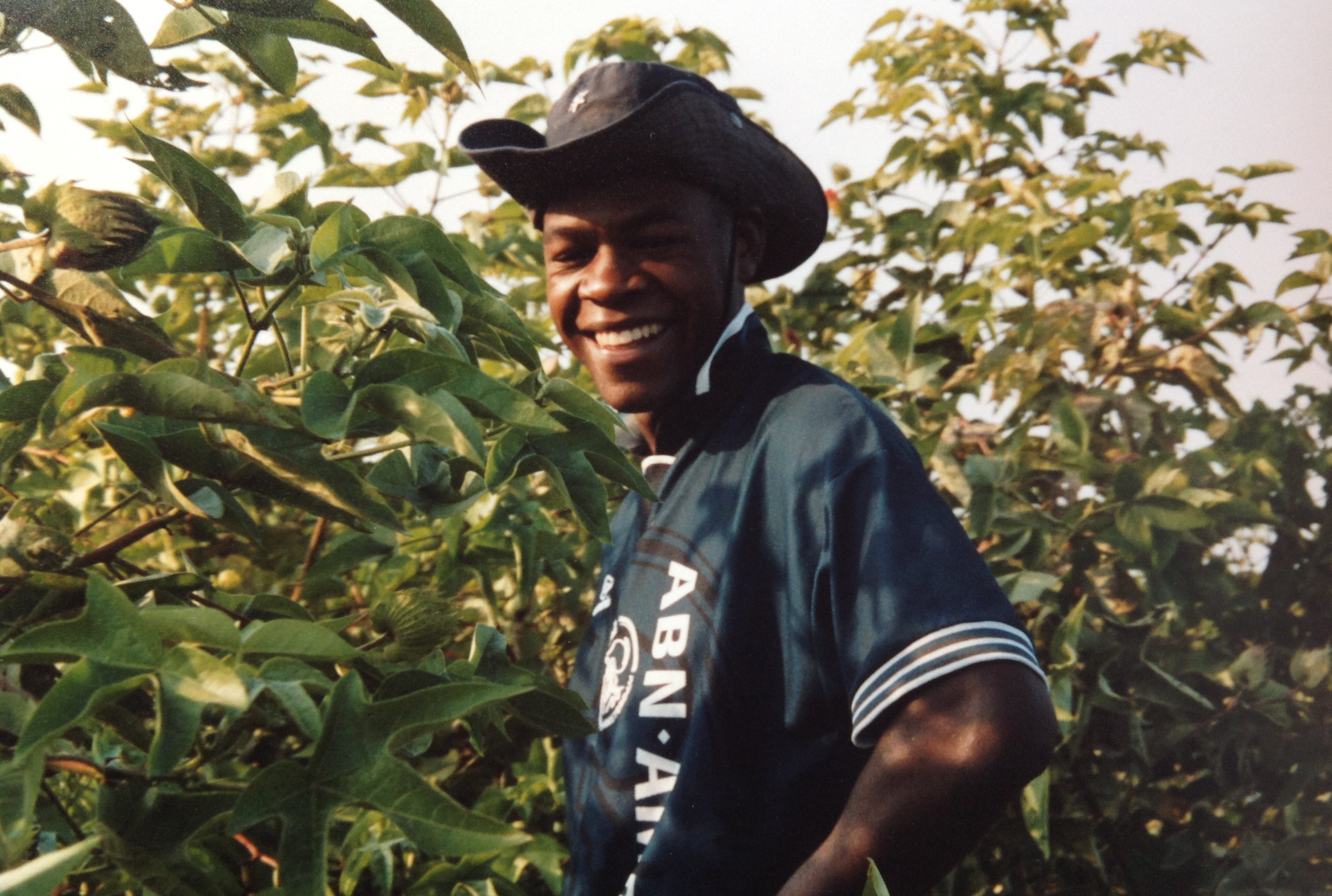
Afro-Peruvian man collecting cotton, Ica Region of Peru

The Afro-Peruvian population is found mainly in two sectors: north coast (between La Libertad, Lambayeque, Piura and Tumbes); and on the south central coast (especially in Lima, Callao, and in the provinces of Cañete, Chincha, Pisco, and Nazca).

The highest concentration of Afro-Peruvians in the country is found in Yapatera in Morropón (Piura); composed of about 7000 farmers, most of whom are descendants of former enslaved African people, where a large number of people of "Malagasy" or "Mangache" origin (from Madagascar) stand out. The Province of Morropón is known for its Black communities in cities such as the capital city of Morropón, around Chulucanas, in addition to Yapatera, there are Chapica del Carmelo, Salitral, Buenos Aires, La Mantaza, (Hacienda Pabur), San Juan de Mustache and Canchaque. Between the provinces of Ayabaca and Sullana you can also find Black communities such as Las Lomas, La Tina (near the border) or Pacaipampa.

When it says "northern valleys" it refers to valleys that are in the yunga. Cities such as the famous colonial city of Zaña in Lambayeque stand out for being the second most important Afro-Peruvian city in northern Peru. Other cities such as: Tumán, Batán Grande, Cayaltí and Capote in the department of Lambayeque are known for hosting a good number of Afro-Peruvian populations.

In the city of Lima, the districts of Cercado (Lima), Breña, Surquillo, Rímac, San Martín de Porres, Independencia, Los Olivos, Puente Piedra, Barranco, Surco, Chorrillos, Villa El Salvador, San Juan de Miraflores, Villa María, Comas and La Victoria are known for having regular numbers of Afro-Peruvian populations, as well as Callao. The town of Aucallama in the province of Huaral is also known.

The coastal cities of the central and southern regions known for their Black populations are Cañete, Chincha, Pisco, Ica and Nazca. Formerly the communities to the south of Lima were known as the peoples with the highest intensity of Afro-Peru, but due to excessive miscegenation between African descendants and Andean migrants, the Afro-Peruvian roots have been lost. Another reason is that many of them also migrated to Lima for better opportunities. However, there are still important settlements known for their traditional presence of Afro-Peruvians: El Carmen and El Guayabo, in the province of Chincha, where Julio "Chocolate" Algendones and the traditional Ballumbrosio family come from; in addition to San Luis, in the province of Cañete, land of Caitro Soto, Coco Linares and Ronaldo Campos.

Further south there are Afro-Peruvian communities in the district of El Ingenio, in the province of Nazca; and the town of Acarí, in the province of Caravelí, in the coastal north of the department of Arequipa.

An interesting fact is that former enslaved African people came to small valleys of the central high jungle located in Pasco and Huánuco. There are still small populations with distant but evidently African features.

== Geographical distribution ==
According to the 2017 Peruvian Census, 828,841 or 3.6% Peruvians identified as "Black", the term used for people of unmixed African descent, while together with the Mulatos and Zambos they would be a total of 9% of the Peruvian population (2,850,000). The departments with the largest percentage of Black people are Tumbes (11.5%), Piura (8.9), Lambayeque (8.4%) and La Libertad (7.4%). The regions with the lowest percentage of self-identified Black people are Puno (0.0), Huancavelica (0.1), and Cuzco (0.2%).

Population by region, 2017
Region		Population	Percent
	Tumbes	19,701	11.5%
	Piura	124,961	8.9%
Lambayeque Department	Lambayeque	78,638	8.4%
	La Libertad	102,034	7.4%
	Cajamarca	59,924	5.8%
	Ica	33,280	5.0%
	Callao	38,346	4.8%
	San Martín	28,723	4.7%
	Lima	26,112	3.6%
	Amazonas	9,458	3.4%
	Ancash	26,925	3.2%
(Lima)	Lima Province	194,661	2.8%
	Loreto	17,010	2.7%
Madre de Dios Department	Madre de Dios	2,792	2.6%
	Moquegua	3,734	2.6%
	Huánuco	12,585	2.3%
(Arequipa)	Arequipa	24,259	2.2%
	Ucayali	7,511	2.1%
	Tacna	4,674	1.7%
	Ayacucho	3,893	0.8%
Pasco Department	Pasco	1,571	0.8%
Junin	Junín	4,361	0.5%
	Apurímac	795	0.3%
Cusco	Cuzco	2,287	0.2%
	Huancavelica	221	0.1%
	Puno	390	0%
(Peru)	Peru	828,841	3.6%

== Government apology ==
In November 2009, the Peruvian government issued an official apology to Peru's Afro-Peruvian people for centuries of racial injustice; it was the first such apology ever made by the government. It was announced by Women's and Social Development Minister Nidia Vilchez, and initially published in the official newspaper El Peruano. The apology said:

We extend a historical apology to Afro-Peruvian people for the abuse, exclusion and discrimination perpetrated against them since the colonial era until the present.

Vilchez said the government hoped its apology would help promote the "true integration of all Peru's multicultural population."

The government acknowledged that some discrimination persists against Afro-Peruvians, who make up 5%–10% of the population. The government's initial statement said, "The government recognizes and regrets that vestiges of racially-motivated harassment are still present, which represent a hindrance to social, economic, labor and educational development of the population at large." Monica Carrillo of the Center for Afro-Peruvian Studies and Promotion indicates that 27% of Afro-Peruvians finish high school and just 2% get higher or technical education. Although Peru is not the first Latin American government to apologize to its population, it is the first to acknowledge present-day discrimination. Although some human rights groups lauded the government's acknowledgment, other experts criticized the apology overall for failing to reference slavery or promise a change in the status quo.

The public ceremony for the apology held on 7 December 2009 in the Great Dining Room of the Government Palace, with the presence of then President Alan García, the Minister of Women and Social Development, Nidia Vilchez, the Afro Peruvian Congress member Martha Moyano, with the former mayor of El Carmen, Hermes Palma-Quiroz, and the founder of the Black Movement Francisco Congo, Paul Colino-Monroy.

In the ceremony, President García said:

We are here together for an unusual act without precedent, to apologize to the Afro Peruvian people but most deeply pardon to the Black race, that our voice can be heard in the countries inflicted with the slavery commerce, which tore so many men and women, millions of them, and took them away to the ends of the planet to work in plantations.

== Notable Afro-Peruvians ==
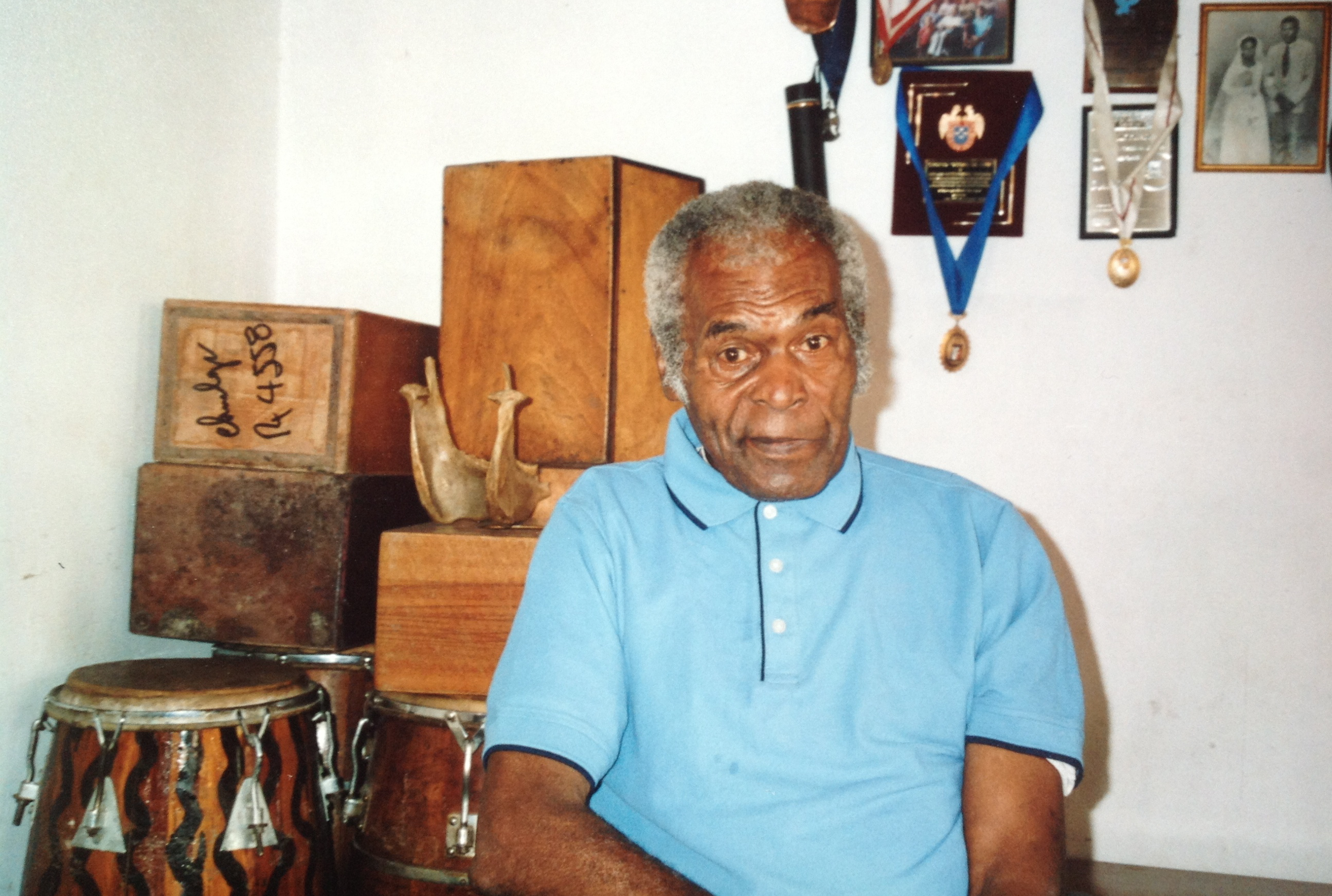
Amador Ballumbrosio, musician and dancer

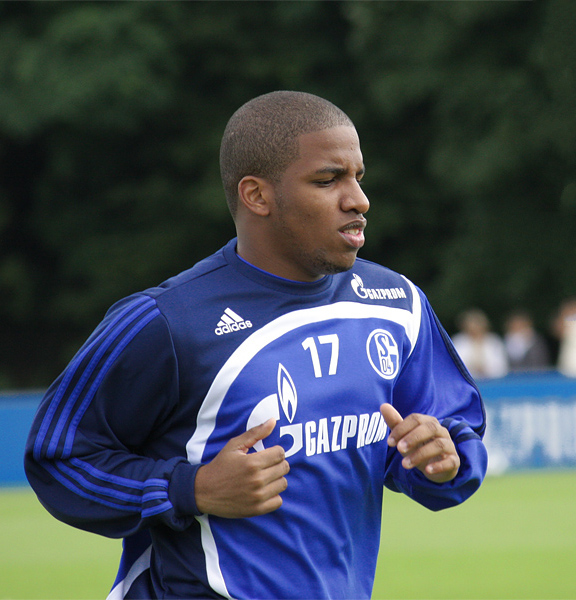
Jefferson Farfán, football winger, played in Europe for many years and is the second top goalscorer for Peru's national team.

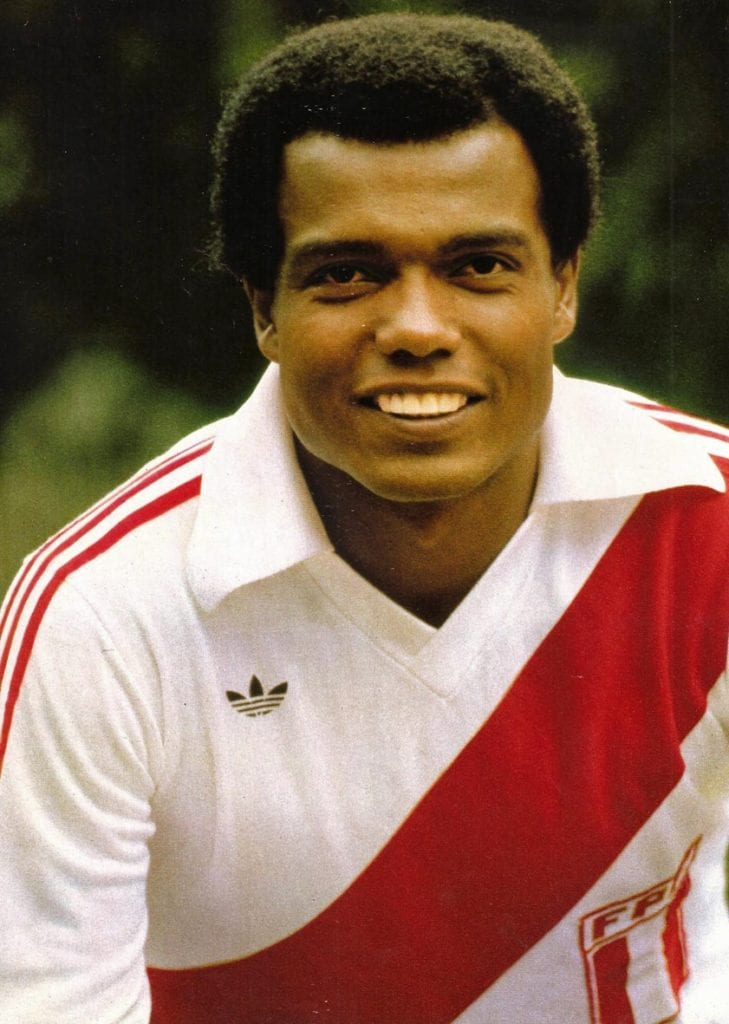
Teófilo Cubillas, footballer, considered to be the greatest Peruvian player

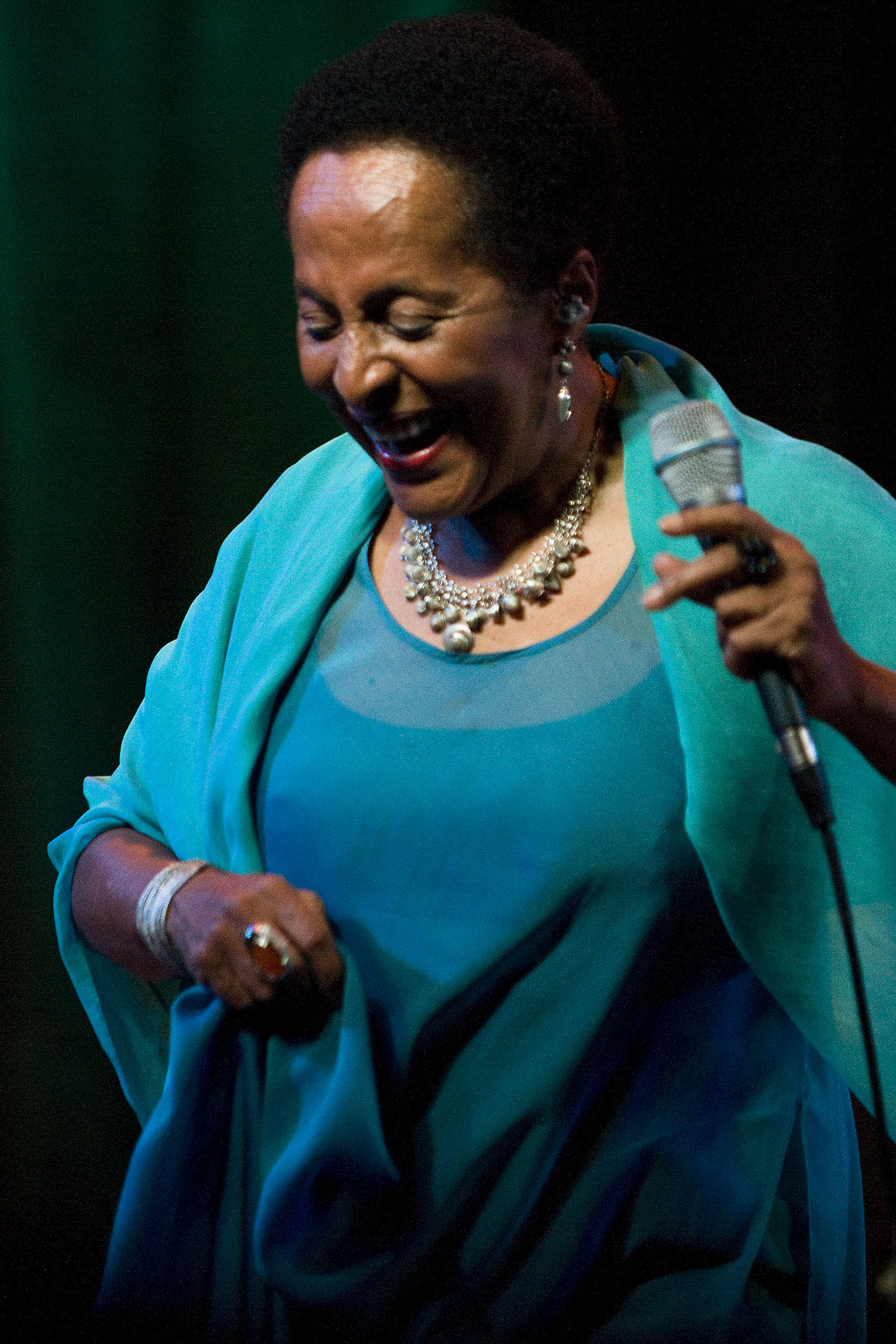
Susana Baca, singer/songwriter, former cabinet member

- Enrique Verástegui (1950–2018), awarded author and mathematician.
- Juan Jose Cabezudo (died 1860), chef
- Nicomedes Santa Cruz (1925–1992), folklorist, Afro-Peruvian writer and poet
- Andy Polo
- Carlos Ascues
- Carlos Cáceda
- Damián Ísmodes
- Pedro Gallese, goalkeeper for the Orlando City Soccer Club
- Victoria Santa Cruz (1922–2014), folklorist and director of the Conjunto Nacional de Folclore del Instituto Nacional de Cultura
- Eva Ayllón, pop singer, interpreter of folk music and renowned Afro-Peruvian
- Christian Ramos, footballer for the Peruvian national team
- Susana Baca, musician; won a Grammy Award for Best Folk Album in 2002; composer, singer and scholar of the rhythms of "Afro" descent in Peru
- Caitro Soto, Afro-Peruvian musician and composer
- Gerónimo Barbadillo, former soccer player, played Italian football in the 1980s
- Lucila Campos, singer and member of Perú Negro
- Arturo "Zambo" Cavero, singer and percussionist
- Benedicta de la Colina, farmworker and labor leader
- Teófilo Cubillas, considered the greatest Peruvian soccer player of all time
- Pedro Pablo León, Peru's soccer player of the 1970 FIFA World Cup
- José Gil de Castro, "Mulato Gil de Castro", artist, hero of the Peruvian Revolution as well as renowned soldier in Chilean army
- Jefferson Farfán, current soccer player for Lokomotiv Moscow
- Francisco Fierro ("Pancho Fierro"), artist
- Luisa Fuentes, better known as Lucha Fuentes, volleyball player with the Peruvian national team; won numerous international titles, including five championships and three South American Panamerican Subchampionships; participated in two Olympics (Mexico and Montreal) and six world championships
- Teresa Izquierdo (1934–2011), chef and restaurant founder
- Juan Joya, former soccer player of Alianza Lima Peru, Peñarol Uruguay and River Plate Argentina
- Julio Meléndez, named the greatest Boca Juniors stopper
- Mauro Mina, former South American light-heavyweight champion boxer
- María Elena Moyano, civil leader
- Martha Moyano, congresswoman
- Manuel Ricardo Palma Soriano, poet, writer, author of Peruvian Traditions
- St. Martin de Porres, famous Limeño saint, first Black saint
- Lucha Reyes, interpreter, folk singer known for her voice in Peruvian Waltz and participating in boleros in Mexico
- Luis Miguel Sánchez Cerro (1889–1933), president of Peru
- Rafael Santa Cruz, actor
- Andres Soto, singer-songwriter
- Caitro Soto, born Pedro Carlos Soto de la Colina, musician, composer, cajon player
- Cecilia Tait, former volleyball player; regarded as among the best players of all time in the spike; Congresswoman-elect of the Republic during the 2001–06 legislative period
- Immortal Technique, aka Felipe Andres Coronel, American rapper and urban activist.
- Julio César Uribe, former soccer player, idol of Junior de Barranquilla Americas and Mexico. He also played for Italian football in the 1980s
- Pablo Branda Villanueva (aka Melcochita), salsa singer and comedian
- Delia Zamudio (born 1943), trade unionist and human rights activist
- Luis Advíncula, footballer born in Chincha, Ica. Formerly played for Boca Juniors, Rayo Vallecano. He is one of the Peruvian soccer players with the most appearances.
- Luis Guadalupe
- Pedro Aquino
- Marcos López
- Alexander Callens
- Xioczana Canales
- Pierina Núñez
- Héctor Chumpitaz
- Andre Carrillo
- Fabiola Herrera
- Roberto Mosquera
- Juan José Muñante
- Julio Landauri
- José Navarro
- Yordy Reyna
- Rodulfo Manzo
- Renato Tapia
- Miguel Araujo
- José Velásquez
- Miguel Villalta
- Roberto Rojas
- Deyair Reyes
- Gerald Távara
- Guillermo La Rosa
- Jair Céspedes
- Juan Flores
- Luis Ramirez
- Andres Mendoza
- Damián Ísmodes

== See also ==
- Afro-Latin American
- Afro-Spaniard
- Cañete Province
- List of Afro-Latinos
- Música criolla
- Música negra
- Racism in Peru
