= Festejo =

Festive form of Afro-Peruvian music

- Etymology: "Festejo" in Spanish literally means "Celebration", and comes from the Spanish word "fiesta" meaning "party"
- Other names: Peruvian Festejo (Festejo peruano), Afro-Peruvian Festejo (Festejo afroperuano).
- Stylistic origins: Black Peruvian Music, Peruvian Creole Music and African Music
- Cultural origins: 20th Century, Peru
- Typical instruments: Bass, Cajón, Conga, Classical Guitar and Vocal

The Festejo (from Spanish 'fiesta') music and dance style originated from Afro-Peruvian traditions. It shows their festive rhythms and cultural heritage. The dance is a staple in the Black coastal populations and it celebrates the emancipation of slaves. It is recognized as a key expression of Afro-Peruvian cultural identity and is often performed at festivals, cultural events, and staged performances. Festejo is recognized for its high energy and the improvisation carried out by the dancers. It is often understood as a traditional genre, but researchers note that the modern form was shaped through processes of revival and consolidation during the twentieth century. Some believe that its origins trace back to competitive dance circles performed by individuals playing cajóns. Despite its African origins, people of all different backgrounds participate in the dance that many regard as one of the greatest representations of Peruvian culture.

It is currently performed, in its most traditional form, in San Luis de Cañete and El Carmen District, Chincha.

== History ==
There are theories that describe the Festejo as a dance that began in Lima in the mid-17th century, but they do not provide evidence to support these hypotheses. No musical example has yet been established to show that this musical form existed before 1800. However, some Festejos dating from the 19th century have been identified. Since the middle of the 20th century, old Festejos have been collected from the areas of Lima, Aucallama, Cañete and Chincha.

The development of Afro-Peruvian musical traditions occurred during the period of slavery and colonial governance in Peru. Raúl R. Romero says that Peru was as a major center of Black slavery throughout the colonial era in Latin America because of the significant Black population in costal urban areas such as Lima.

Omar H. Ali explains that Afro-Peruvian cultural practices kept surviving through community resistance and cultural resilience which allowed traditions of music and dance to stay. Afro-Peruvian communities kept their cultural traditions alive through dance and music which brought people together to celebrate, even though they were going through difficult times. These practices became powerful expressions of identity and historical memory for the Afro-Peruvian communities.

According to musicologist William Tompkins, by the early 1900s the original choreography was almost completely lost. It is from 1949, that a standard choreography for the "Festejo" begins to be generated in the "Peruvian Folk Music and Dance School" (today the José María Arguedas National Higher School of Folklore).

== Revival ==
Raúl R. Romero states that Afro-Peruvian musical traditions such as Festejo were reconstructed during the mid-twentieth century as part of a cultural movement that aimed to restore African heritage in Peru. The revival movement involved artists and intellectuals who studied, reinterpreted, and shared Afro-Peruvian traditions within national culture. The revival was not aimed at preserving a fixed historical form, but instead to reconstruct traditions that had been historically disempowered and divided.

Through media attention and staged performances, Festejo became much more standardized and widely recognized throughout time. It has gone from being a local or informal activity to being a representative symbol of Afro-Peruvian music.

Begging in the 1960s, Festejo became one of the most visible and frequently performed Afro-Peruvian musical genres, particularly through the works of José Durand, Victoria Santa Cruz and Nicomedes Santa Cruz.

In 1971, the "Black Art Festival" of Cañete began, which for the first time included a contest where the best dancer is elected "Miss Festejo". Between 1975 and 1977, a composition contest for Festejo and similar genres was included. In the same decade, a new style of Festejo is popularized for women that some musicians call "valentina style", for which they dress in colorful skirts and bras.

== Musical and dance style ==
Festejo is known for its strong rhythmic focus and use of percussion. The use of percussions is the core rhythmic drive. León notes that festejo's musical form became more clearly defined as it was adapted for performance and cultural presentation. Festejo uses instruments such as the guitar, cajon, cajita, and quijada. Later additions of instruments such as tumbadoras, bongos, and guiro emphasized more regularized rhythms which was mainly used for stage performances.

The dance associated with Festejo is energetic and expressive. The movements closely follow the rhythm of the music. Contemporary descriptions emphasize its celebratory nature and its connection to joy and pride. These qualities are extremely common in modern performances. It is a lively and energetic danced characterized by movements that encourage full-body motions. The dance usually alternates between in-place steps and dynamic, playful displacements. Dancers will usually be on the tips of their toes to do small jumps and quick turns, with hip movements mirrored in the arms. For female dances, the motion of their skirts is included naturally in the performance, which enhances the visual expression of the dance.

== Globalization ==
Due to the advent of globalization, many Afro-Peruvian music genres (especially Festejo) have been experiencing influences from other cultures and genres of music. Afro-Peruvian music was performed only in Afro-Peruvian communities to help create and maintain Afro-Peruvian identity and strengthen social bonds. However, globalization has brought those communities closer to the outside world that Afro-Peruvians started to market their songs to non Afro-Peruvian audiences. Therefore, the music genres, including Festejo, are adapting to the changing environment. Because of this change, the purpose of Festejo changed and many musicians are trying to use it as a way for economic prosperity rather than its traditional role in those communities.
