= El Cajon (disambiguation) =

El Cajon may refer to:

- El Cajon, California, United States
- El Cajón, Catamarca, Argentina
- Rancho El Cajon, a Mexican land grant in modern-day California, United States

== See also ==
- Cajón, a musical instrument
- Cajon Canyon, in California, United States
- Cajon Pass, in California, United States
- El Cajon Boulevard, in California, United States
- El Cajón Dam (disambiguation)
- El Cajon Formation, in Mexico
- El Cajon Mountain, in California, United States
