= Toro Mata =

Afro-Peruvian song

"Toro Mata" ("The Bull Kills" in Spanish) is one of the most famous Afro-Peruvian songs in Peru, which has been recorded and developed by many different musical artists throughout its history. "Toro Mata" is a type of Peruvian music initially developed by enslaved black people in Cañete and Chincha.

== History ==
"Toro Mata" is a song influenced by Afro-Peruvian musical styles (this song is classified as a landó), and over the years, has become a popular anthem for Peru. A dance of "Toro Mata" also developed, which mocks and parodies the stylized waltzes of European Conquistadores. This politically charged song and dance developed as a reaction to the conquest of Peru by Spain. By the beginning of the 20th century, "Toro Mata" was fading from popularity, but it has again become popular due to the revival of musica criolla starting in the 1950s.

One of the most famous versions of "Toro Mata" was performed by Carlos Soto de la Colina (also known as Caitro Soto) in 1973. "Toro Mata" has also been performed by Peruvian musicians Susana Baca, Eva Ayllon, Peru Negro and Lucila Campos. There are many different versions of "Toro Mata" within Peru, with slight differences in content, though all center on a deadly bull. The song has gained popularity outside of Peru, with Cuban artist Celia Cruz recording a salsa version of the song.

== See also ==
- Afro-Peruvian
- Musica criolla
- Musica negra
