= Zamudio (surname) =

Zamudio is a Spanish surname. Notable people with the surname include:

- Adela Zamudio (1854–1928), Bolivian poet and feminist
- Alejandro Zamudio (born 1998) Mexican footballer
- Daniel Zamudio (1987–2012), Chilean man murdered in 2012
- Delia Zamudio (1943–2024), Peruvian trade unionist
- Gustavo Zamudio (born 1985), Chilean footballer
- Héctor Fix-Zamudio (born 1942), Mexican jurist
- Ignacio Zamudio (born 1971), Mexican race walker
- Jesse Zamudio (born 1999), Mexican footballer
- José Mario Carrillo Zamudio (born 1956), Mexican football coach
- Kelly Zamudio, US American biologist
- Luis Zamudio (born 1998), US American soccer (football) player
- María Zamudio Guzmán (born 1961), Mexican politician
- Raúl Zamudio, US American art critic
- Ysaias Zamudio (born 1969), Mexican boxer
- Yulissa Zamudio (born 1976), Peruvian volleyball player
