= Rafael Santa Cruz =

Afro-Peruvian musician and author

Rafael Santa Cruz (29 September 1960 – 4 August 2014) was a renowned Afro-Peruvian musician and author of the book El Cajón Afroperuano on the cajón, a Peruvian instrument created from wooden boxes by slaves when their owners tried to ban the drum culture, fearing the drums would help form slave uprisings.

== See also ==
Cajón
