= Benedicta de la Colina =

Benedicta de la Colina (October 8, 1897 – September 26, 1971) was an Afro-Peruvian farmworker and labor leader. She was politically active in the early years of the Revolutionary Union party.

== Early life ==
Benedicta de la Colina was born in San Luis de Cañete, Peru, in 1897. Her parents were Mauro de la Colina and Pilar Orellana. Growing up among the first generations of free Black Peruvians, she was taught the Afro-Peruvian musical and dance traditions of her region, learning to play the piano.

== Activism ==
De la Colina became an agricultural worker on the haciendas of the Cañete Valley. In 1919, a national 8-hour workday was established, but it was not applied on the cotton farms where she worked for as much as 16 hours daily. In response, after the 1930 Peruvian coup d'état, she became a fervent supporter of Luis Miguel Sánchez Cerro and joined the Revolutionary Union party.

Increasingly active as a local leader in the movement, she organized mobilizations on the Cañete haciendas. During the 1931 electoral campaign, she welcomed Sánchez Cerro when he visited Cañete. On his election, he gave her 7 hectares (17 acres) of land and a house in San Luis.

Due to her activism in support of labor reforms, the hacienda owners hatched a plot to assassinate her. Hearing of this, she fled to Lima, where she met with Sánchez Cerro to tell him of her situation. He gave her a revolver for her protection and had his aide-de-camp give her shooting lessons. Later, when she was attacked at home, she managed to fire a shot that scared off the attacker, who abandoned his weapon, an axe, at the door to her house.

== Later life ==
As the Revolutionary Union party took a fascist turn after Sánchez Cerro's assassination, de la Colina became less involved in political activism. In the late 1940s, she settled permanently in Lima, where she lived in the Barrios Altos neighborhood. There, she worked as a cook and domestic laborer.

She was married to Francisco Soto and was widowed in 1941. Their family produced several successful musicians, including their son Caitro Soto and their grandson Pepe Vásquez.

De la Colina died in Lima in 1971.
