= Cajón de tapeo =

Traditional Mexican wood box drum

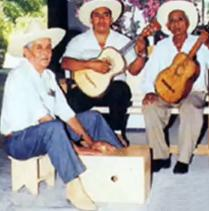
Cajón de tapeo, guitar and vihuela

The cajón de tapeo, tapeador, cajón de tamboreo or Mexican cajon is a wood box drum traditional to southern Mexico. It is played by slapping the top face with a piece of wood in one hand, and a bare hand. It was developed as a substitute of the tarima de baile (wood sound-box platform for zapateado dancing) of Oaxaca and Guerrero. It usually follows 3/4 and 6/8 time signatures. In 1962, musicologist E. Thomas Stanford wrote a description of its use in Jamiltepec, Oaxaca.

== See also ==
- Cajón
