= Perú Negro =

- Origin: Lima, Peru
- Genres: Folk music, alternative rock
- Years active: 1969–present

Perú Negro is an Afro-Peruvian musical ensemble founded in 1969 to celebrate and preserve Peru's black culture and música criolla. Ronaldo Campos de la Colina founded the Lima-based group with 12 family members. The group has been appointed by the government of Peru as the "Cultural Ambassadors of Black Peru." When Ronaldo Campos died in 2001, his son Rony Campos took over the direction of the troupe. Today, the group has over 30 members and a youth troupe, Peru Negrito. The group's album, Sangre de un Don led to the first ever U.S. tour in 2002. In 2005 the group was honored with two Grammy nominations for their second US album, Jolgorio. The first nomination came through the Latin Grammys’ traditional music category and the second for the Grammy's World Music category and in 2008 the group received another Grammy nomination for their album Zamba Malato. In 2010, the group teamed up with famed Peruvian singer, Eva Ayllon to record the album 40 years of Afro Peruvian Classics. The collaboration led to a Latin Grammy Nomination for Best Folk Album.

== Members ==
- Ronaldo Campos de la Colina (cajon and dance)
- Linder Góngora (guitar)
- Isidoro Izquierdo (guitar)
- Orlando Soto (quijada and bell)
- Caitro Soto (voice)
- Lucila Campos (voice)
- Esperanza Campos (dance)
- Pilar de la Cruz (dance)
- Sara de la Cruz (dance)
- Lalo Izquierdo (dance)
- Rodolfo Arteaga (dance)
- Víctor Padilla (dance)
- Eusebio "Pititi" Sirio (cajon and dance)
- Guillermo "El Niño" Nicasio (congas)
- Julio "Chocolate" Algendones (bongos)
- Sonia de la Cruz (voice)
- María Laguna (voice)
- Elizabeth Carrillo (voice)
- Gilberto Bramón (voice)
- Felipe Carrillo (voice)
- Manuel Donayre (voice)

== Discography ==
- (2001) Sangre de un Don
- (2004) Jolgorio
- (2008) Samba Malato
- (2010) Eva Ayllon & Peru Negro 40 Years of Afro Peruvian Classics

== See also ==
- Afro-Peruvian
- Cañete
- Musica negra
- Cajon box drum
