= Teresa Izquierdo =

Peruvian cook and writer (1934–2011)

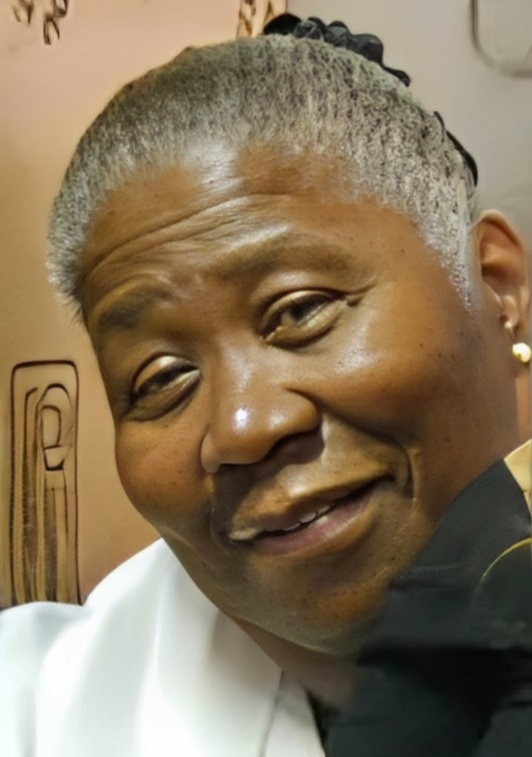
- Born: March 10, 1934; Lince District, Peru
- Died: July 27, 2011 (aged 77)
- Occupation: Cook
- Years active: 1978–2011
- Known for: El Rincón Que No Conoces

Teresa Izquierdo (March 10, 1934 – July 27, 2011) was a noted Peruvian master chef. Affectionately known as "the mother of Peruvian food", she founded the renowned restaurant El Rincón Que No Conoces ("The corner you don´t know"), in a working-class neighbourhood of Lima, receiving acclaim within and outside of the country as one of the chief proponents of traditional coastal criollo cuisine. Characteristically humble, she insisted in interviews on being called a cook rather than a chef. A contest for the top soup-kitchen chefs is named after her.

== Biography ==
Teresa Izquierdo was born in Lince District, Lima Province, Peru, in humble circumstances. Her father was from Rímac District and her mother from Cañete. Of African heritage, Teresa was taught at a very early age how to cook recipes inherited from her grandmother by her mother, who was sought after as a cook by wealthy houses in the capital. Teresa discovered her own culinary talent at eight years of age when she successfully took charge of the kitchen after her mother fell ill.

In 1978 Izquierdo decided to open her own restaurant, named "El Rincon Que No Conoces" (El RQNC), initially launched to sell desserts in the streets of Lince, drawing on her Afro-Peruvian background to produce high-quality traditional dishes. According to Catherine Contreras, "on April 28, 1978, with only S/. 300 in capital, she opened a small locale on Av. Petit Thouars called 'El Rincón que no Conoces.' She was there for 20 years, until she moved a few blocks away. One night she closed her restaurant and the next morning she opened in block three of Bernardo Alcedo, also in Lince." As the popularity of the restaurant spread, her loyal clientele included politicians, businessmen, artists and journalists, locals as well as travellers, El RQNC went on to become one of the most famous restaurants in Lima, and Teresa Izquierdo became a household name, writing books and building a significant media presence through a regular demand for interviews, including being featured on Rachael Ray's Food Network.

She died in Lima, aged 77, in July 2011.

== Awards and legacy ==
Izquierdo was the recipient of many honours, and shortly before her death was awarded the Orden al Mérito por Servicios Distinguidos (Merit Order for Distinguished Services) in the Gran Oficial ranking. El Rincón que no Conoces is now under the direction of her daughter, Elena Santos Izquierdo.
