= Son de los Diablos =

Afro-Peruvian dance

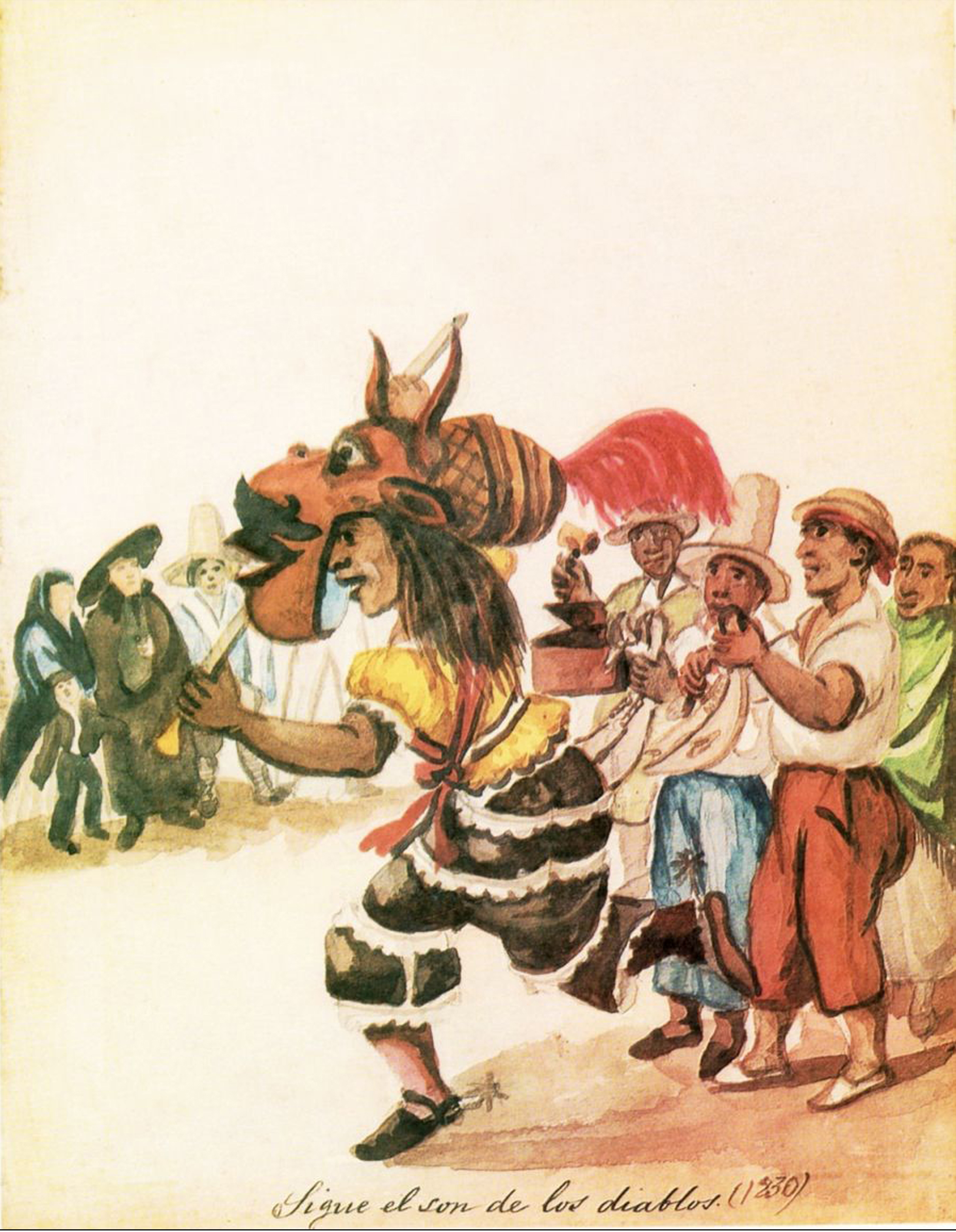
- Watercolor by Pancho Fierro
- Genre: Afro-Peruvian
- Inventor: José Durand Flórez
- Origin: Peru

The Son de los Diablos is an Afro-Peruvian dance that developed as a mixture of African, Spanish, and Amerindian rhythms. Nicomedes Santa Cruz explains that, despite popular opinion, the Son de los Diablos has no links with African rituals or with the Andean Morenada, but rather it has a very slight similarity with the Diabladas of Oruro (Bolivia).

== Name ==
In English, the name directly translates as "Song of the Devils".

== History ==
Developed during the Viceroyalty of Peru with origins in Spain, the Son de los Diablos was assimilated by the black slaves living in the Spanish colony. After the independence of Peru in 1821, people of African descent lived in alleys near churches and plazas of Lima, where festivities were held. Before the celebrations, blacks joined the festivities by forming gangs that danced the Son de los Diablos.

Much like the Diablada, the Son de los Diablos was heavily influenced by the Spanish Corpus Christi celebrations, it was predominantly practiced by an ethnic community (in this case the Afro-Peruvian community), and it was banned from religious celebrations by the Catholic Church in 1817. Nonetheless, the dance would remain an important part of carnival celebrations in Lima until the early 20th century. The dance would gain a revival in the 1950s when Jose Durand used Pancho Fierro's depictions of the dance and the information provided by old Son de los Diablos dancers in order to once again bring the dance back to life.

== Music ==
A distinguishing factor of the Son de los Diablos is its usage of such instruments as the Cajita, a small wooden box that opens and closes creating a distinctive sound, and the Quijada, the jawbone of a horse, donkey, or mule, that when hit creates a raspy buzz.
