= El Cajón, Catamarca =

Coordinates: 26°26′S 66°16′W

El Cajón
- Municipality and village
- Interactive map of El Cajón
- Country: Argentina
- Province: Catamarca
- Department: Santa María
- Time zone: UTC−3 (ART)

El Cajón is a village and municipality in Catamarca Province in northwestern Argentina.
