= Caitro Soto =

Afro-Peruvian musician and composer

- Born: Pedro Carlos Soto de la Colina; 23 October 1934; San Luis, Cañete, Peru
- Died: 19 July 2004 (aged 69); Lima, Peru
- Occupations: musician, composer
- Mother: Benedicta de la Colina

Pedro Carlos Soto de la Colina (23 October 1934, San Luis, Cañete, Peru – 19 July 2004, Lima, Peru), popularly known as Caitro Soto, was an Afro-Peruvian musician and composer.

He was known for his version of the Peruvian folk song, "Toro Mata" and as part of the Afro-Peruvian artist's collective Peru Negro. Peru Negro, located in Lima, is one of the most important organizations dedicated to preserving Afro-Peruvian music, dance and culture. Soto appeared in The Motorcycle Diaries as "Papá Carlito", a resident of the leper colony at San Pablo, Peru. There is a book by Caitro Soto written in Spanish with an accompanying compact disc entitled De Cajón: Caitro Soto – el duende en la música Afroperuana, published by el Comercio in Lima, Peru, in 1995.

== Filmography ==
Year	Title	Role	Notes
2004	The Motorcycle Diaries	Papa Carlito	(Peru)
