= Cajón =

Box-shaped percussion instrument

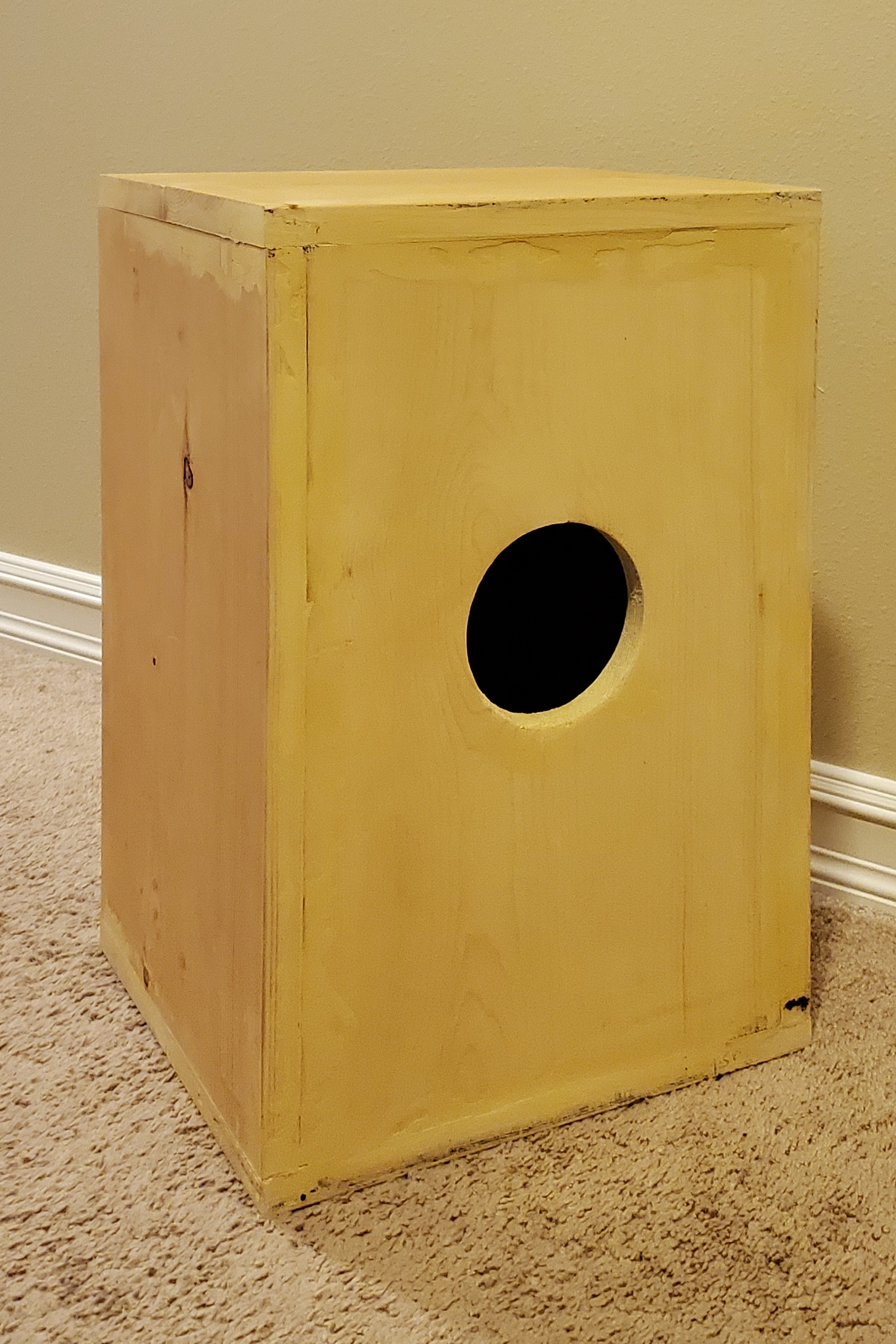

Percussion instrument
- Classification: idiophone
- Hornbostel–Sachs classification: 111.24 (Percussion vessels)
- Developed: late 19th century

Related instruments
- Cymbal; Wood block

Cultural Heritage of Peru
- Official name: Cajón Peruano
- Type: Intangible
- Criteria: Music and dances
- Designated: 2 August 2001; 25 years ago
- Legal basis: R.D.N. 798/INC-2001

Sounds of a cajón in use

A cajón (Spanish: [kaˈxon] ka-KHON; "box, crate, drawer") is a box-shaped percussion instrument originally from Peru, played by slapping the front or rear faces (generally thin plywood) with the hands, fingers, or sometimes implements such as brushes, mallets, or sticks.

Cajóns are primarily played in Afro-Peruvian music (specifically música criolla), but have made their way into flamenco as well. The term cajón is also applied to other box drums used in Latin American music, such as the Cuban cajón de rumba and the Mexican cajón de tapeo.

== Description ==
Sheets of 13 to 19 mm (1/2 to 3/4 inch) thick wood are generally used for five sides of the box. A thinner sheet of plywood is nailed on as the sixth side, and acts as the striking surface or head. The striking surface of the cajón drum is commonly referred to as the tapa. A sound hole is cut on the back side. The modern cajón may have rubber feet, and has several screws at the top for adjusting percussive timbre.

== Origins and evolution ==
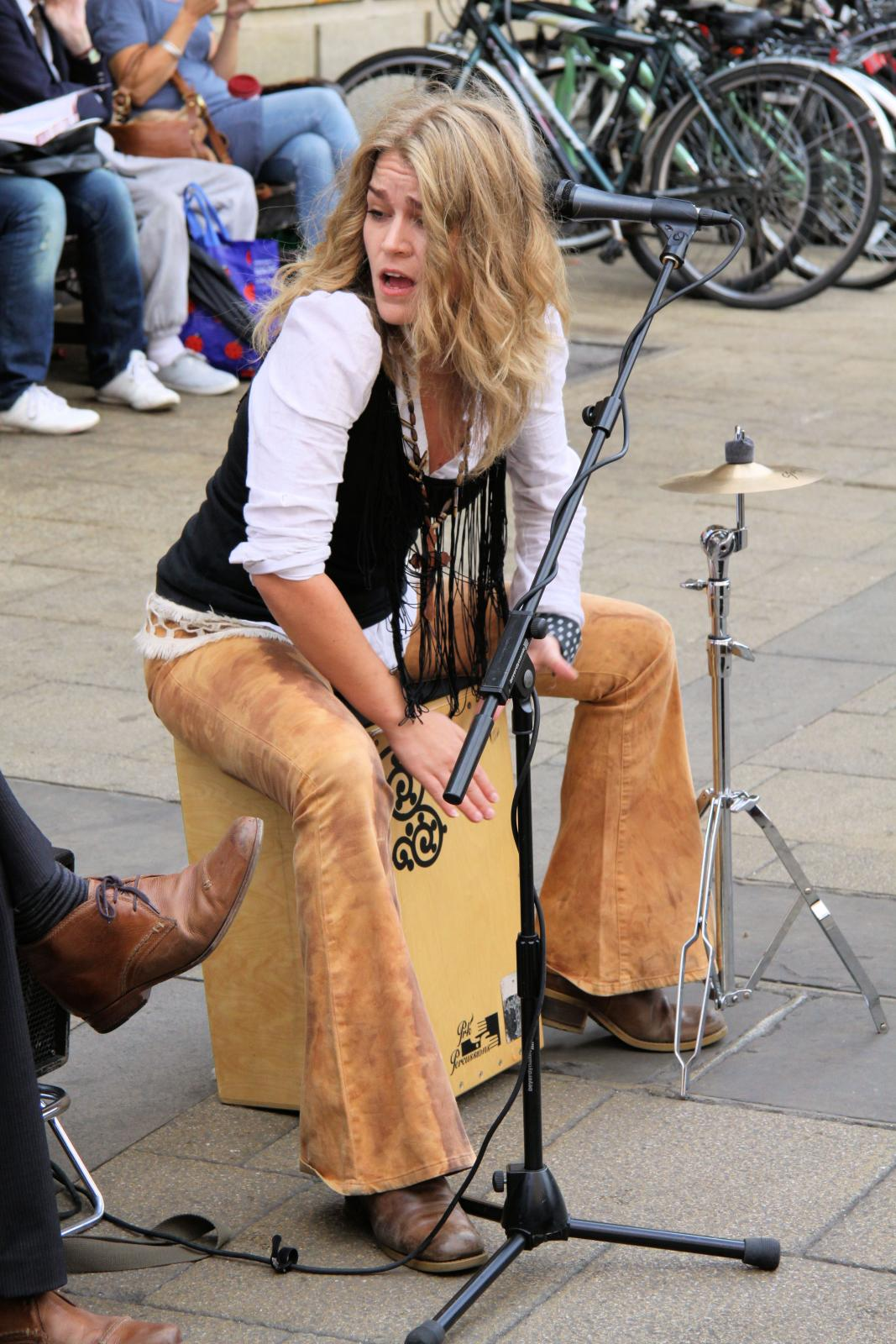
Heidi Joubert playing a decorated cajón in Cambridge, England

The cajón is the most widely used Afro-Peruvian musical instrument since the late 19th century. Enslaved people of west and central African origin in the Americas are considered to be the source of the cajón drum. Currently, the instrument is common in musical performance throughout some of the Americas and Spain. The cajón was developed during the periods of slavery in coastal Peru. The instrument reached a peak in popularity by 1850, and by the end of the 19th century cajón players were experimenting with the design of the instrument by bending some of the planks in the cajón's body to alter the instrument's patterns of sound vibration. After slavery the cajón was spread to a much larger audience including Criollos.

Given that the cajón comes from musicians who were enslaved in the Spanish colonial Americas, there are two complementary origin theories for the instrument. It is possible that the drum is a direct descendant of a number of boxlike musical instruments from west and central Africa, especially Angola, and the Antilles. These instruments were adapted by enslaved people from the Spanish shipping crates at their disposal. In port cities like Matanzas, Cuba, codfish shipping crates and small dresser drawers became similar instruments. Peruvian musician and ethnomusicologist Susana Baca recounts her mother's story that the cajón originated as "the box of the people who carried fruit and worked in the ports," putting it down to play on whenever they had a moment. Another theory is that enslaved people used boxes as musical instruments to subvert Spanish colonial bans on music in predominantly African areas, essentially disguising their instruments.

While early 20th century versions of the festejo appeared to have been performed without the cajón, especially due to the influence of Perú Negro, a musical ensemble founded in 1969, the cajón began to be more important than the guitar and, indeed, became "a new symbol of Peruvian blackness".

After a short 1977 visit to a diplomat’s party and a TV presentation in Lima along with Peruvian percussionist Caitro Soto, Spanish flamenco guitar player Paco de Lucía brought a cajón to Spain to use it in his own music, after being impressed by the rhythmic possibilities of the instrument. According to percussion historians, it was Pepe Ébano who introduced the cajón into Spanish flamenco, later used with Paco de Lucía in the percussion of "Entre dos aguas". In 2001, the cajón was declared National Heritage by the Peruvian National Institute of Culture. In 2014, the Organization of American States declared the cajón an "Instrument of Peru for the Americas".

== Contemporary music ==
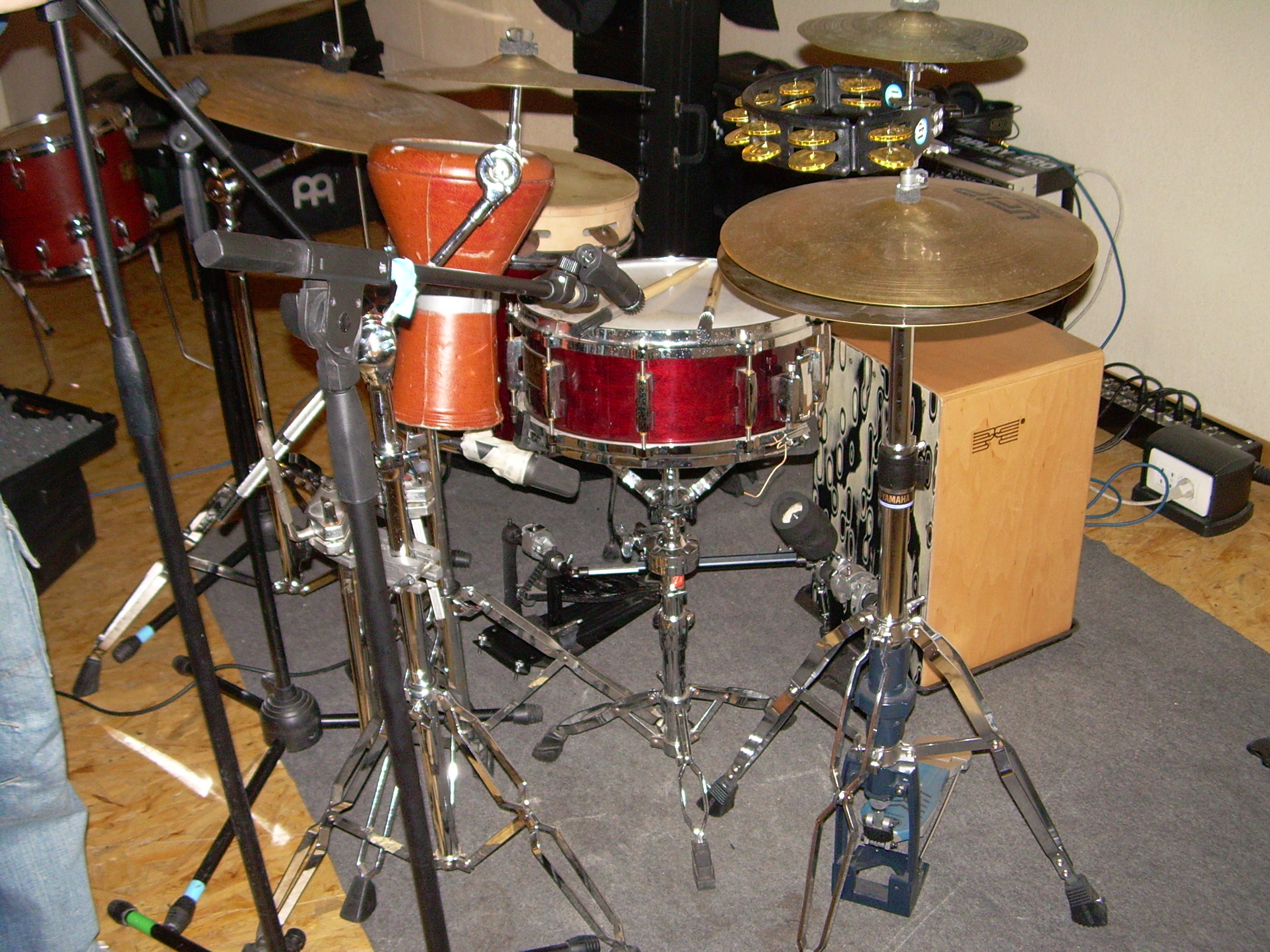
Example percussion setup, with cajón replacing the bass drum

In the 2000s (decade), the cajón was heard extensively in Coastal Peruvian musical styles such as Tondero, Zamacueca and Peruvian Waltz, Spanish modern Flamenco and certain styles of modern Cuban Rumba. The modern cajón is often used to accompany a solo acoustic guitar or piano. The cajón is becoming rapidly popular in blues, pop, rock, funk, world music, jazz, etc. The cajón is often used as a bass drum by bands instead of a full drum kit when performing in minimalist settings, as the cajón can simultaneously serve as both a bass drum and a seat for the drummer. Though occasionally played by some bands in place of the bodhrán, the cajón has become a popular instrument in the folk music of Ireland, where the quieter and higher-pitched bodhrán traditional frame drum serves the same purpose, and has a unique playing style.

== Playing styles ==
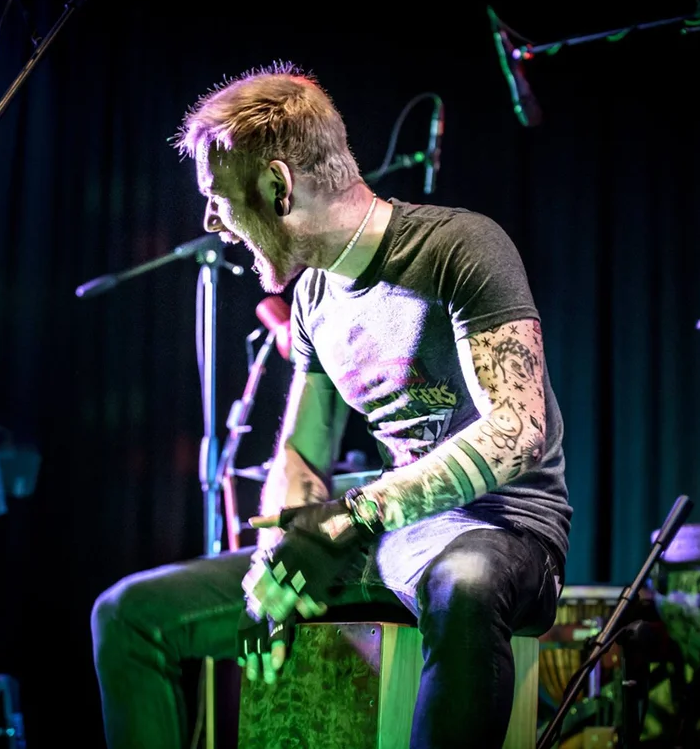
Percussionist Jesse Benns playing with Drumming Gloves

The player sits astride the box, tilting it at an angle while striking the head between their knees. The percussionist can play the sides with the top of their palms and fingers for additional sounds. Some harder hitting players use protective drumming gloves to protect their hands from bruises and blisters. Some percussionists attach a bass drum pedal to the instrument, enabling them to play it with a single foot. There are also lap cajons (which are smaller and more portable) that sit on the lap of the musician.

The instrument has been played not only with hands, but also with plastic and metal brushes, as used for drum kits, for example with the Pen Technique, developed by Patrizio Migliarini, which allows the musician to play jazz and funky rhythms with a completeness and dynamic richness close to that of a drums, through the use of metal brushes. Another way of playing the cajón is to use an ordinary bass drum pedal, thus turning the cajón into an indirect percussion instrument which can be played with the feet. This enables the player to beat it just like a pedal-bass drum, thus leaving the hands (and one other foot) free to play other instruments. On the other hand, it also restricts the player's standard cajón-playing position, as when the cajón is placed on the ground, in the bass drum location, it is hard for the performer to slap it with their hands.

== Gallery ==
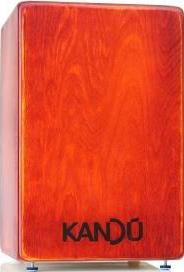
Kandu Tempest Wild cajon

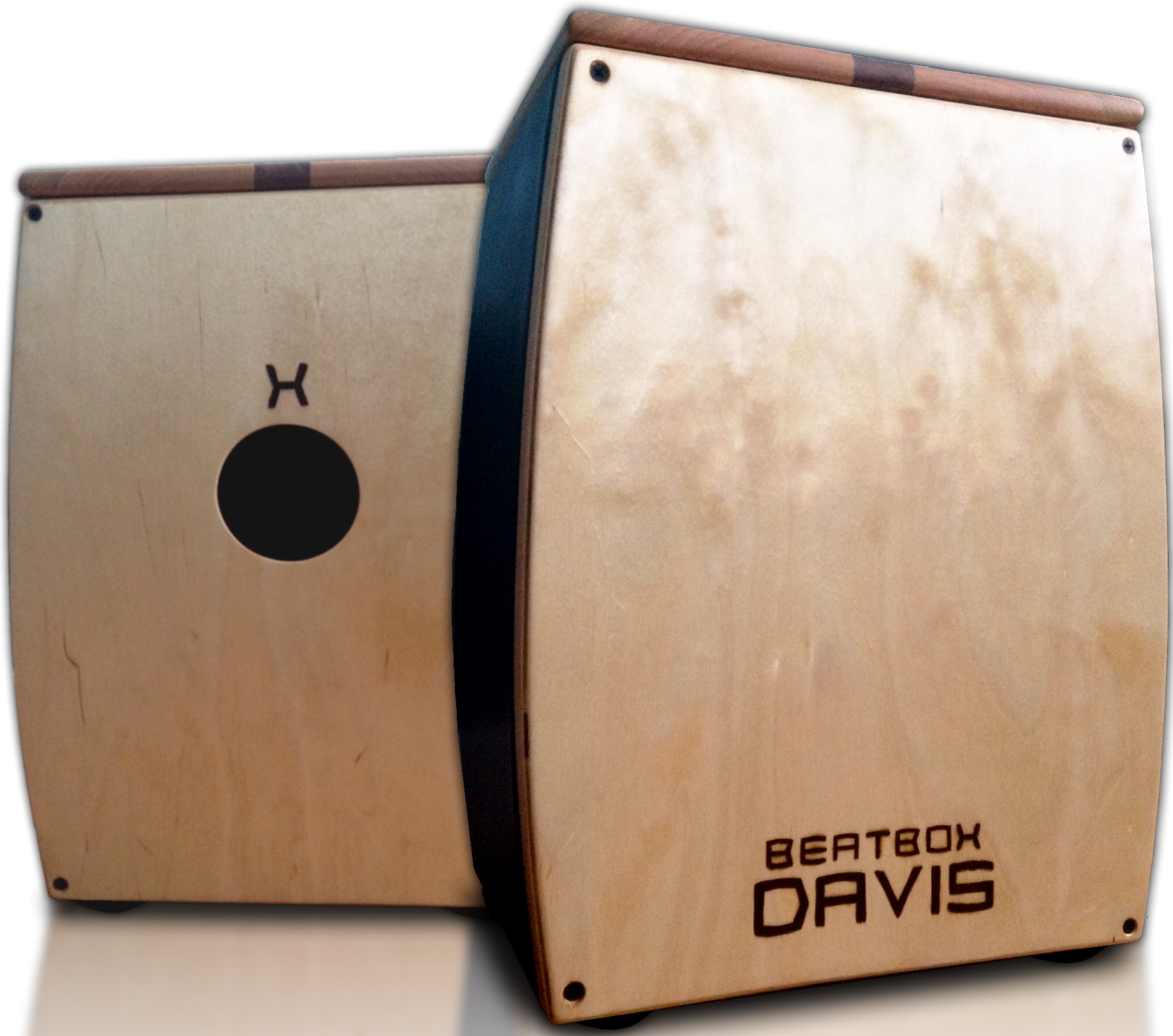
DavisDrum BeatBox Davis Pro M1

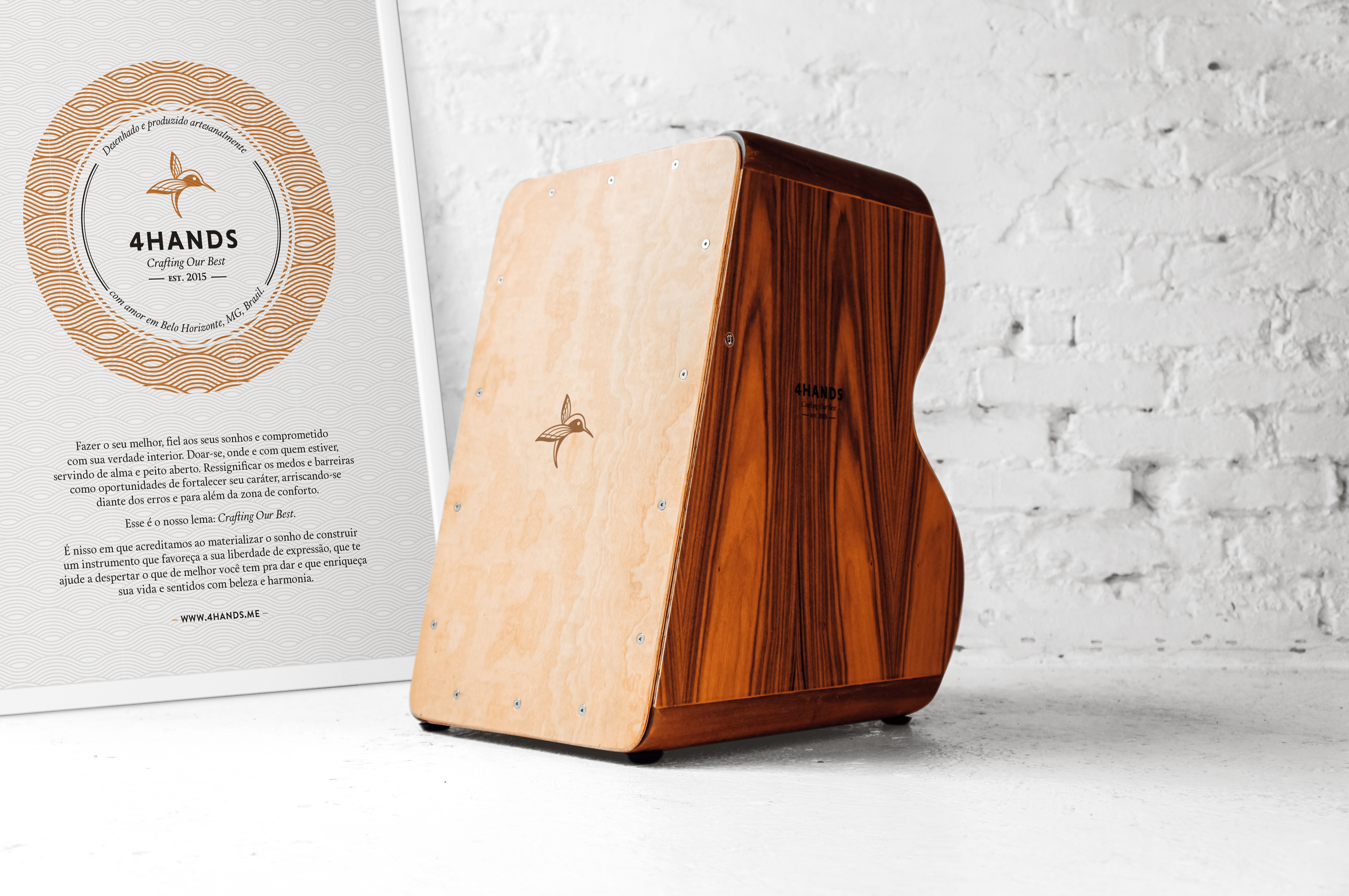
4hands Handmade Cajón Golden Colibri with guitar strings

== See also ==
- Afro-Peruvian music
- El Cajon (disambiguation)
- Jawbone (instrument)
- Festejo
