= El Cajón Dam =

El Cajon Dam may refer to:

- El Cajón Dam (Argentina)
- El Cajón Dam (Honduras)
- El Cajón Dam (Mexico)
