= Delia Zamudio =

Peruvian trade unionist (1943–2024)

- Born: Delia Rosa Zamudio Palacios; 20 June 1943; Hacienda "Hoja Redonda", Chincha Province, Peru
- Died: 28 September 2024 (aged 81)
- Occupations: Trade unionist and Afro-Peruvian and women's rights activist
- Years active: 1955–2024

Delia Rosa Zamudio Palacios (20 June 1943 – 28 September 2024) was an Afro-Peruvian trade unionist and leader in the activism for the rights of Afro-Peruvian women. She was the first woman to become the head of the General Confederation of Workers of Peru (Spanish: Confederación General de Trabajadores del Perú (CGTP)). She has worked since the 1970s to improve the human and civil rights of Afro-Peruvians and working women. As a founder of the Casa de Refugio San Juan de Lurigancho she has worked to assist victims of domestic and sexual violence. She was recognized by the Ministry of Culture for her contributions with the Meritorious Personality of Culture Award in 2014.

== Early life ==
Delia Rosa Zamudio Palacios was born in 1943, on the hacienda “Hoja Redonda” in the Chincha Province of Peru to Victoria Palacios and Grimaldo Zamudio. In the 1950s, her mother migrated with her children to the La Victoria District of Lima in search of employment. After completing the third grade, Zamudio stopped attending school to care for her younger siblings to enable her mother to work. At twelve, she began working as a domestic laborer and three years later began working at the Libertad Canning Factory in the Rímac District. Simultaneously while working during the day, Zamudio returned to school and completed her primary education. In 1966, she was hired at a pharmaceutical factory and joined the union. Within three years, she was elected as the social assistance secretary of the factory union. Continuing her night studies, Zamudio completed her secondary education at the Escuela María Parado de Bellido in Rímac in 1971.

== Activism ==
Zamudio's struggle for her education and to earn a livable wage, as a poor black woman in a predominantly Latino culture, led her into activism. In 1970, she became a representative of the "Federation of Laboratories, Drug Stores and Affiliates" and began participating as a delegate in conventions. Openly critical of President Juan Velasco Alvarado's military regime, she attended the 1974 Convention of Industrial Communities to protest the government. Becoming a member of the Revolutionary Worker's Party (RWP), in 1975, she was selected as the secretary-general of the General Confederation of Workers of Peru (Spanish: Confederación General de Trabajadores del Perú (CGTP)). Her election was the first time a woman or Afro-Peruvian had headed a trade organization in Peru. The CGTP is an umbrella organization of labor unions in Peru and during her tenure through 1980 as the head of the confederation, Zamudio fought for the rights of women workers. In 1977, the union held protests demanding social and political rights and Zamudio was one of those involved in the national strike. She was selected by RWP as a provisional candidate to the 1978 Constituent Assembly, but as a result of her activism, she was replaced by another candidate and lost her job.

In 1981, Zamudio was a delegate to the Convention of Mexican Laborers and the following year became secretary for women's concerns in the CGTP. In addition to her labor activism, Zamudio attended women’s rights conferences, like the Latin American Feminist Conferences held in Brazil and Mexico in 1986, as well as the 1990 Fifth Argentine Feminist Conference of Buenos Aires. Preferring to work in grassroots organizations because of the paternalistic attitude of more formal women's NGOs, Zamudio's activism focused on training and protection for working-class women. She worked with the Organizing Commission of Peruvian Women (COMUP), to evaluate problems facing women in the work force, looking at maternity rights and sexual harassment, though the proposals did not become law until the 1999 passage of Law 27240 concerning maternity and the 2003 adoption of Law 27942 regarding sexual harassment.

In the mid-1990s, when the Peruvian economy became restricted, Zamudio again lost her job and worked from a small shop in her home. In 1995, a testimonial of her life Piel de mujer (Woman's Skin) was published, describing what it was like to grow up as a poor, black woman with limited opportunities and how through activism and helping others, she overcame the physical and emotional abuse, racism and discrimination she faced by helping others. She founded a women's shelter, the San Juan de Lurigancho House of Refuge (Spanish: Casa de Refugio San Juan de Lurigancho), to assist women and children fleeing domestic violence in her neighborhood. Continuing her advocacy for Afro-Peruvians, she works with the Ministry of Women in the Afro-Peruvian Labor Bureau to address concerns of working women. In 2014 on International Women's Day, Zamudio was one of the honorees of the Meritorious Personality of Culture Award for her human rights work. Her testimony was republished in 2016 by the LUNDU Center for the Afro-Peruvian Study and Promotion (Spanish: LUNDU Centro de Estudios y Promoción Afroperuanos) in a compilation which included forty case studies of violence against women of African descent in Peru.

== Death ==
Zamudio died on 28 September 2024, at the age of 81.
