= Enrique Verástegui =

Peruvian author and mathematician

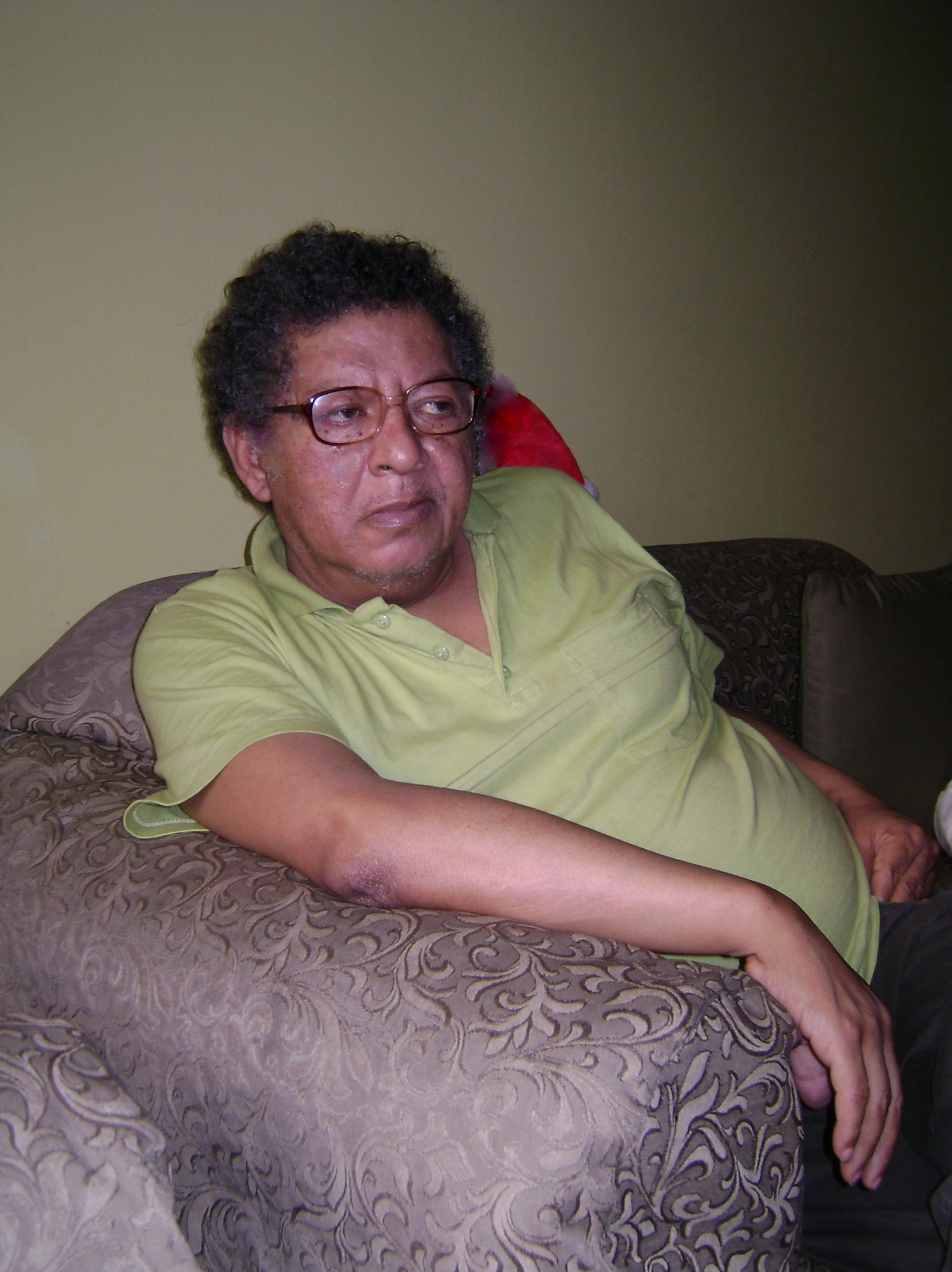
- Enrique Verástegui in 2011
- Born: 24 April 1950; Lima, Peru
- Died: 27 July 2018 (aged 68); Lima, Peru
- Education: National University of San Marcos
- Occupations: Economist, poet, essayist, philosopher, storyteller, novelist, playwright, scriptwriter, musician, watercolorist, physicist, logician and mathematician
- Spouse: Carmen Ollé
- Children: Vanessa Verástegui Ollé
- Awards: Guggenheim Fellowship

Enrique Fidel Verástegui Peláez (24 April 1950 – 27 July 2018) was a Peruvian author and mathematician. He was a member of Movimiento Hora Zero with the poets Jorge Pimentel, Juan Ramírez Ruiz, Jorge Nájar, Enriqueta Belevan and Carmen Ollé.

He was born in Lima but grew up in the city of San Vicente de Cañete. He finished his secondary studies at G.U.E. José Buenaventura Sepúlveda in that same city. After moving to Lima, he studied economics, administration and accounting at the National University of San Marcos. In 1975 he recorded his poems for the Library of Congress of the United States and worked for El Colegio de México. In 1976 he received a Guggenheim Fellowship.

In 1977, he co-founded the Segunda Etapa of Movimiento Hora Zero in Paris with José Carlos Rodríguez and André Laude and published his book The Motor of Desire (El motor del deseo). In 1978, representing the Peruvian community, he read his poems at the tomb of César Vallejo, which earned him the congratulations of Julio Ramón Ribeyro, the Peruvian consul to UNESCO. In 1992 he published his novel trilogy, entitled Terceto de Lima. In 1999 he wrote Pro-total Apology: Essay on Stephen Hawkings, the Peruvian equivalent of the Novum Organum by Francis Bacon, which suggests original developments of algebra. He also invented the Scientific Research Method of pre-duction, which is superior to induction and deduction. He also published El Modelo del Teorema (The model of the theorem).

== Works ==
=== Poetry ===
- En los extramuros del mundo.
- Agregado sin corrección a los estudios de poesía.
- Typewriter concerto.
- Praxis, asalto y destrucción del Infierno.
- Argumento de una bande desineé en cristal líquido
- Leonardo.
- Angelus novus (Tomo I).
- Angelus novus (Tomo II).
- Monte de goce.
- Taki onqoy.
- Splendor IV. Albus.
- Cañete (Antología mínima).
- Ensayo sobre ingeniería.
- El Teorema de Yu.
- Yachay Hanay, seguido de tractatus lógico matemáticus.
- Teoría de los cambios.
- Poesía para señoritas.
- Ángel con laud sideral.
- Equinoccio del cuerpo y el alma.
- Splendor.
- Partitura Peruana.

=== Philosophy ===
- Enrique Verástegui declara.
- Breve informe (alegórico) de los años 60/70: una poética.
- El motor del deseo.
- La máquina del poema.
- Sociedad para la liberación de las rosas.
- El modelo del teorema.
- El cambio del milenio.
- La síntesis metaquímica.
- Apología pro totalidad.
- Poesía y conciencia gnóstica.
- Diez tesis sobre el principio de Dios.
- Música/ciudad: la ecología del sonido.
- Filosofía: Ciencia/Poesía/Matemáticas.
- El análisis de la poesía.
- El saber de las rosas
- La función del mundo: ensayo político sobre oriente y occidente
- Tratado sobre la Yerbaluisa.
- Más allá de la vida y la muerte.
- El modelo de teorema.
- El motor del deseo.
- El análisis de la poesía
- El principio de no-ser.

=== Theory of Poetry ===
- El análisis de la poesía.

=== Mathematics ===
- Teoría y práctica de Xalmo. Lima: Vagón Azul Editores, 2016.
- El modelo del teorema.Curso de matemáticas para ciberpunks.
- Apología pro totalidad. Ensayo sobre Stephen Hawking.
- Yachay Hanay, seguido de tractatus lógico matemáticus.

=== Travel Journals ===
- Diario de viaje: Arequipa.
- Diario de viaje: Arequipa.
- Diario de Menorca: primavera / verano de 1977.
- Diario de Cerro azul.
- Diario de filmación.
- Diario 1980–1995. Homenaje a Durero

=== Novels ===
- Terceto de Lima.
- Sueño de una primavera de Occidente
- La balada del bandolero Luis Pardo.
- Teorema del anarquista ilustrado.
- La máquina del crepús/culo.

=== Tales ===
- El laboratorio del profesor Rangel
- Piscis.
- Michael.
- Patxi: príncipe de la música.
- La casa encantada.
- La Pandilla Ambar.

=== Theater ===
- El exorcismo de Bellmer.
- Agonizar: homenaje a César Vallejo

=== Music and ballet ===
- Proyecto para una òpera en New York.
- En los sótanos más cochinos de la belleza.

=== Art ===
- La expansión matemàtica. (Arte cognitivo).

=== Scripts ===
- Cimarrones.
- Enrique Verástegui.
- Para vivir mañana: Enrique Verástegui.
- Enrique Verástegui.
- Film / Sleeped Quijote.
