= San Luis District, Cañete =

Coordinates: 13.0511°S 76.4305°W

San Luis District
- District
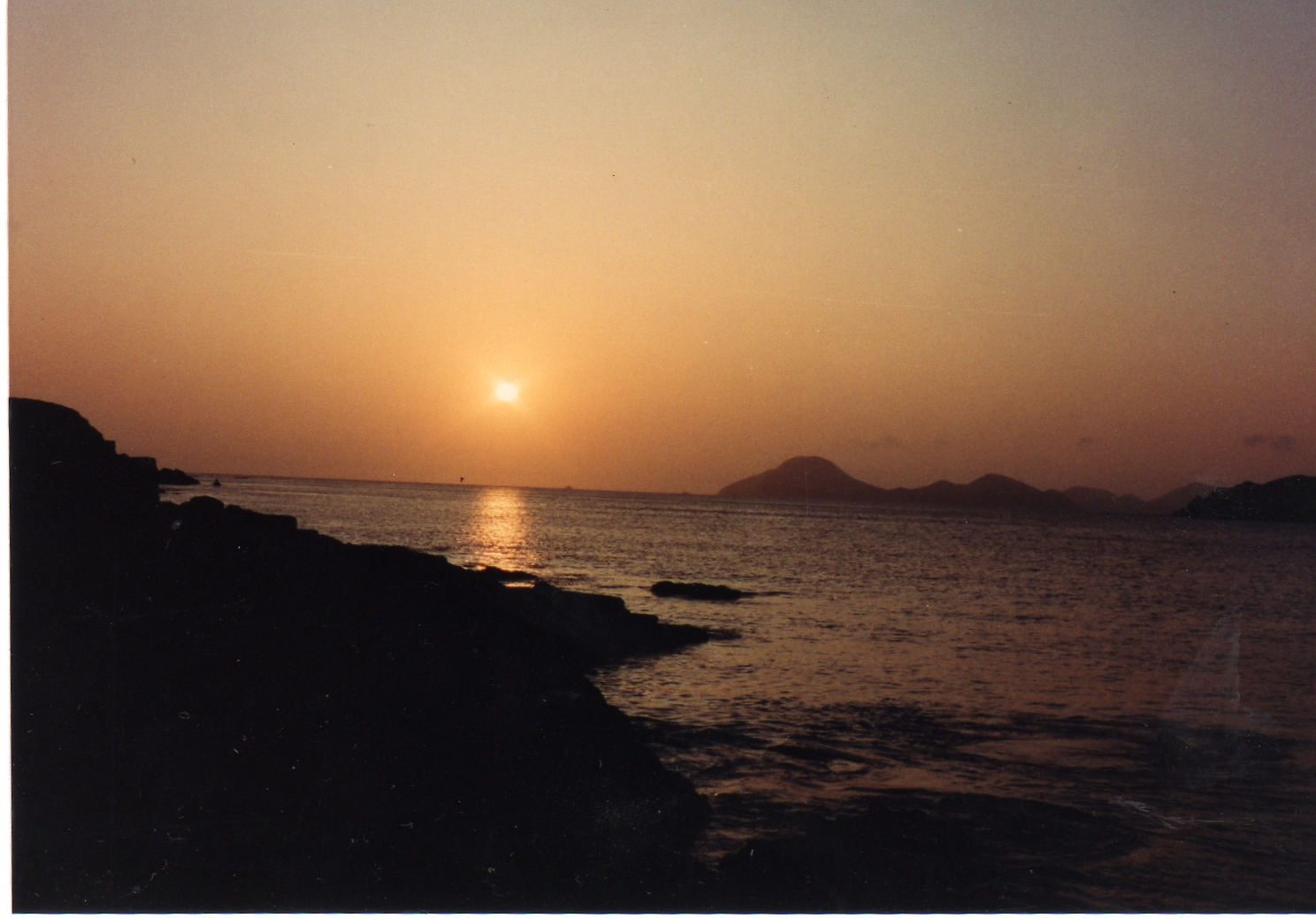
- San Luis in 2009
- Interactive map of San Luis District
- Country: Peru
- Region: Lima
- Province: Cañete
- Founded: January 12, 1871
- Capital: San Luis

Government
  - Mayor: Delia Victoria Solorzano Carrion

Area
  - Total: 38.53 km^{2} (14.88 sq mi)
- Elevation: 26 m (85 ft)

Population (2017)
  - Total: 13,436
  - Density: 348.7/km^{2} (903.2/sq mi)
- Time zone: UTC-5 (PET)
- UBIGEO: 150514

San Luis District is one of sixteen districts of the province Cañete in Peru.

San Luis borders Cerro Azul to the north, San Vicente to the south, the Pacific Ocean to the west and Quilmana to the east. San Luis has a distinctive black population and is a hotbed of Afro-Peruvian music, which evolved from the music of enslaved Africans brought by the Spaniards to Peru during the early 17th century. This includes the styles known as festejo, landó and toro mata. The government of Peru declared the town of San Luis a "Living Repository for Peru's Collective Memory".
