= Zapateo =

Zapateo (English: shoe tapping) is a dance form rooted in the Spanish flamenco and before that, in the ancient cultural influences imported in to Europe by the Romani people.

Zapateo, which later produced the more famous Malambos dance, arrived in South America from Spain around the year 1600 CE and was a favorite pastime of the gaucho (descendants of Spanish conquistadores and aborigines) also known as the "South American cowboys", especially around the camp fires in the lonely stretches of the flatlands, known as the Pampas.

Malambos incorporating the zapateo, the art of percussive footwork rooted in Spanish Flamenco, was traditionally performed by men, as there was a severe shortage of women around those camp fires.

The dance movements include the cepillada (brushing - to graze the floor with the sole of the foot), the repique (striking the floor with heel and spur), and floreos (decorative movements of the feet).

It was often used as a form of competition between two or more men. One man starts with an escobillado (softly brushing the floor with his foot), and then he proposes a "figure" or footwork passage to his competitor, and ends with a salute.

The other man copies the proposed figure, adding one that is more difficult, and then performs the salute.

When one of the men is unable to copy the other, the competition is finished, with the more proficient dancer the winner.

== See also ==
- Zapateado (Spain)
- Zapateado (Mexico)
