= Aucallama District =

Coordinates: 11°33′56″S 77°10′26″W

Aucallama Awqallama
- District
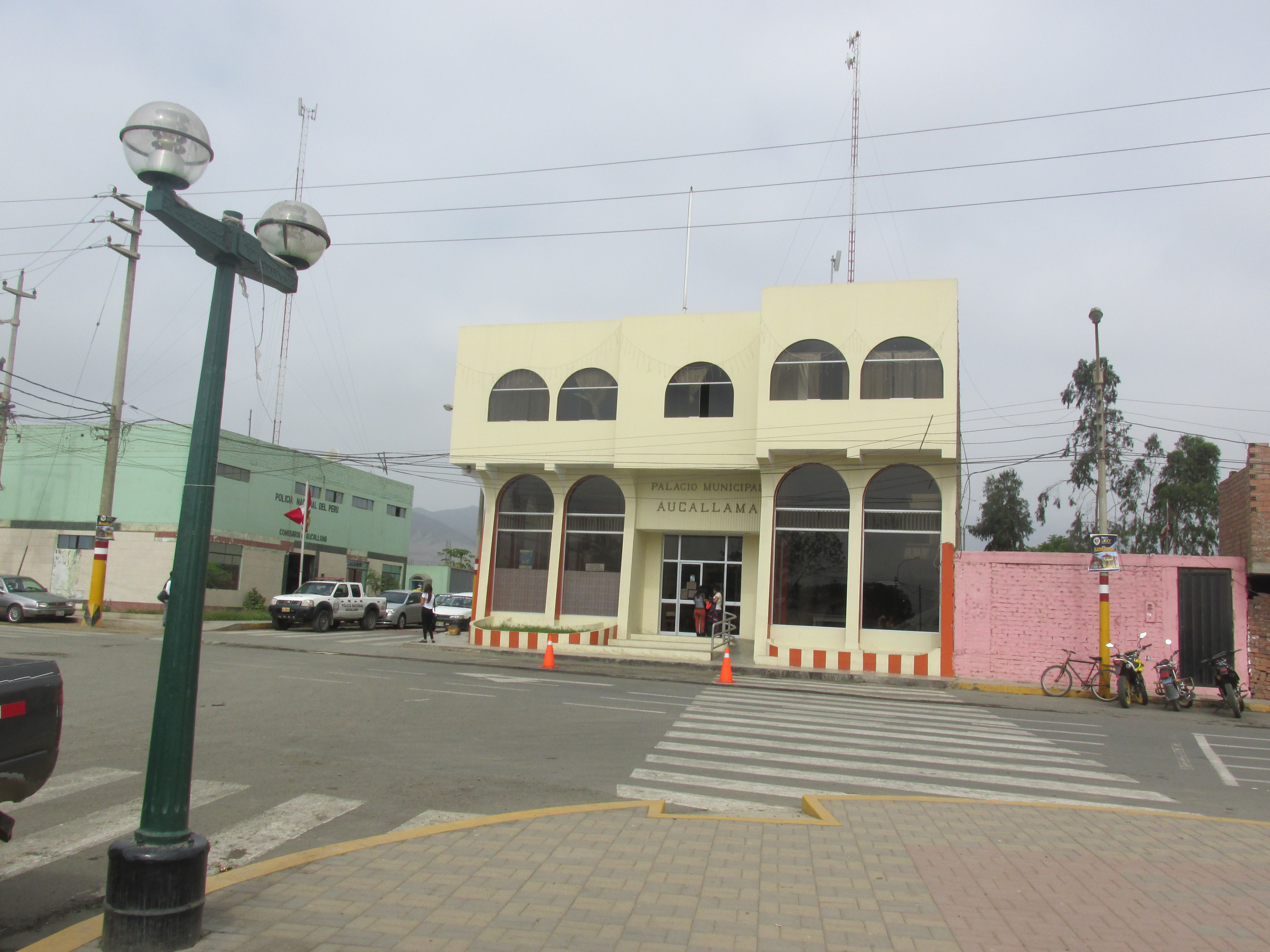

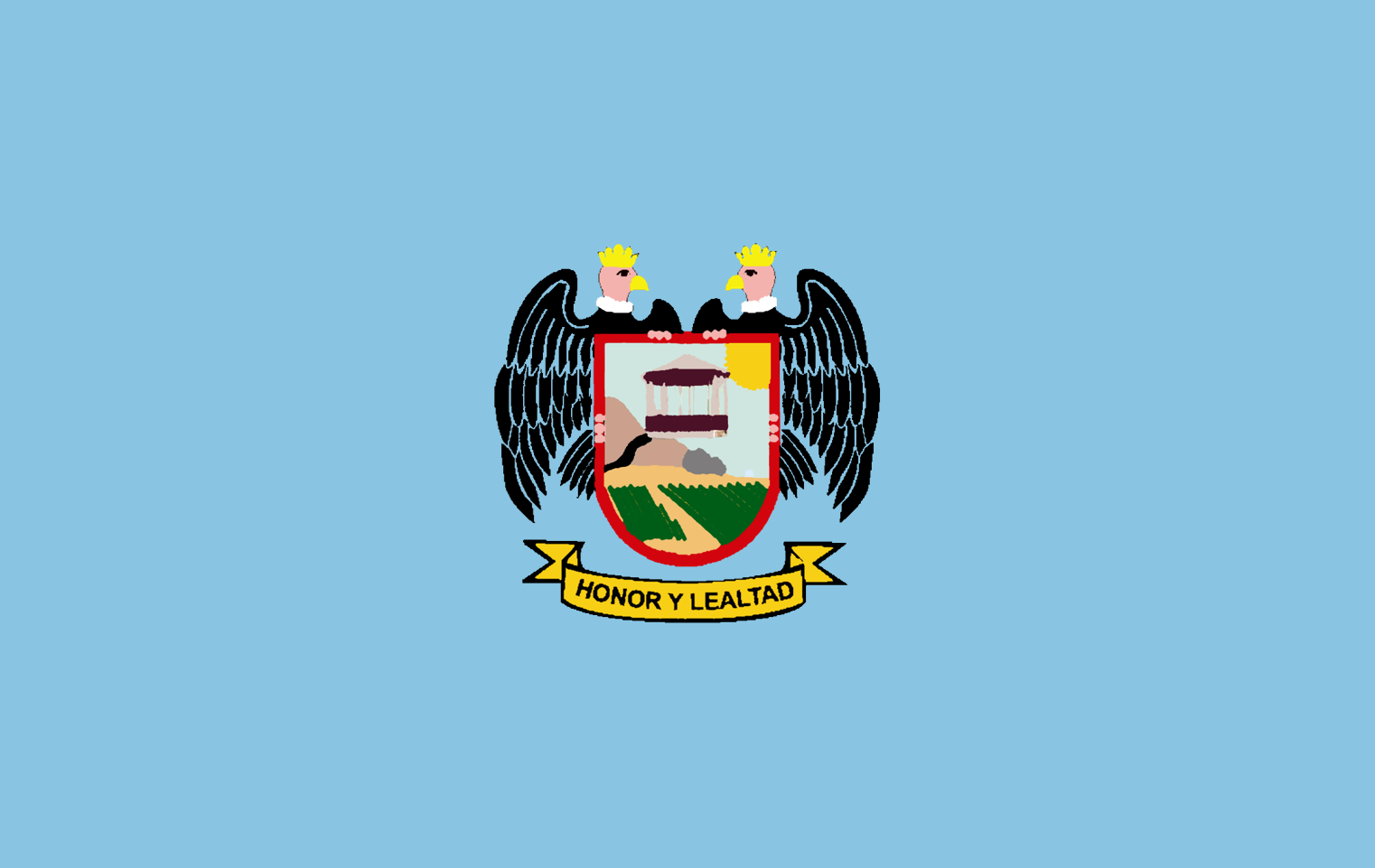
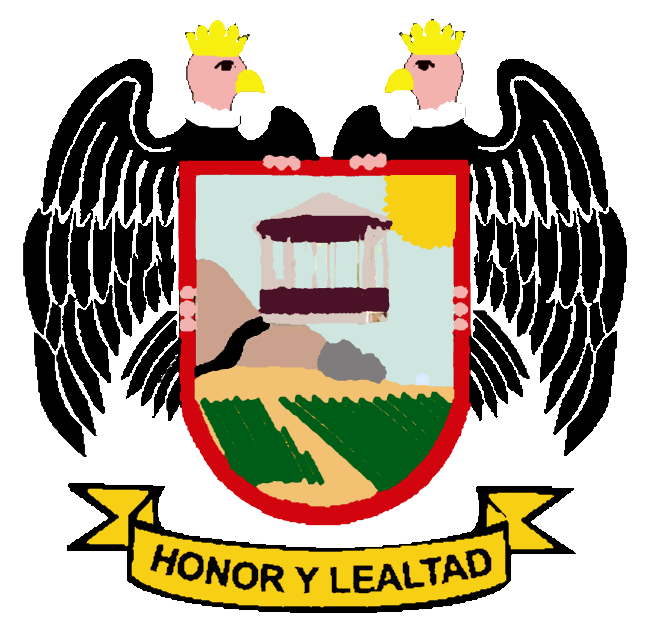
- Flag Coat of arms
- Interactive map of Aucallama
- Country: Peru
- Region: Lima
- Province: Huaral
- Founded: 12 February 1821
- Capital: Aucallama

Government
  - Mayor: Hugo Aniano Alvarez Carballido

Area
  - Total: 716.84 km^{2} (276.77 sq mi)
- Elevation: 145 m (476 ft)

Population (2017)
  - Total: 19,464
  - Density: 27.153/km^{2} (70.325/sq mi)
- Time zone: UTC-5 (PET)
- UBIGEO: 150604
- Website: www.muniaucallama.gob.pe

Aucallama District is one of twelve districts of the province Huaral in Peru.
