= Victoria Santa Cruz =

Peruvian composer

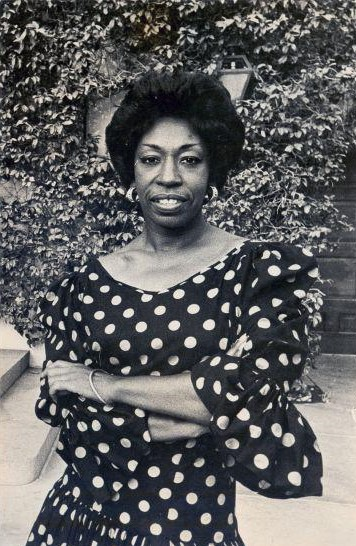
- Portrait of Victoria Santa Cruz
- Born: Victoria Eugenia Santa Cruz Gamarra; October 27, 1922; Lima, Peru
- Died: August 30, 2014 (aged 91); Lima, Peru
- Education: Université du Théâtre des Nations (École Supérieure des Études Chorégraphiques)
- Occupations: Choreographer, composer, performer, professor
- Years active: 1950s–2010s
- Known for: Afro-Peruvian dance and theatre, poem "Me gritaron negra"
- Relatives: Nicomedes Santa Cruz (brother)
- Awards: Best Folklorist (1970), Director of National Folklore Ensemble (1973)

Victoria Eugenia Santa Cruz Gamarra (27 October 1922 – August 30, 2014) was an Afro-Peruvian choreographer, composer and activist.

Victoria Santa Cruz would go on to be called "the mother of Afro Peruvian dance and theatre." Along with her brother, Nicomedes Santa Cruz, she is credited as significant in a revival of Afro-Peruvian culture in the 1960s and 1970s. They both came from a long-line of artists and intellectuals. For her part she is said to have had "Afrocentrism" influences in her view of dance trying to discover "ancestral memory" of African forms. She helped to found the Cumanana company.

== Early life ==
Santa Cruz was born eighth of ten children in Lima, Peru. Her father was Nicomedes Santa Cruz Aparicio and her mother was Victoria Gamarra. Her mother spoke only Spanish and loved to dance. Her younger brother Nicomedes Santa Cruz became a famous poet who she often performed with.

At an early age, Victoria Santa Cruz was introduced to the fine arts, having come from a household full of black artists and musicians. One of her earliest influences were her parents whom she first learned about Afro-Peruvian dance (marinera and other criollo dances) as well as poetry and music. This early on exposure to the fine arts led Victoria Santa Cruz to create and participate in musicals like Malató, which would later on embody one of her lifelong goals of "self-discovery and recuperation of culture based on internal rhythm and what she called ancestral memory." Through this goal, Victoria sought to "awaken black consciousness and pride" in the Afro-Peruvian culture. Her passion for dance and musical composition would continue to influence her throughout her life as she went on to study in Paris.

In an interview with Marcus D. Jones, Santa Cruz describes this moment in her childhood where she first experiences "sufferance." In this scene, she describes how her friends rejected her because of her African features. At the age of five when she was with her group of friends, a new blonde and white girl in her neighborhood told them: “If the black girl wants to play with us, I’ll go”. She makes a direct reference to this in her famous poem, Me gritaron negra. Out of this experience, the artist begins her long-lived exploration of self and recuperation. In this same interview, the artist demonstrates some of the internal dialogue that prompts her desire for self-discovery from a very young age, asking "What am I doing? What is to be black? What is to be white?" In addition to this, Santa Cruz was quoted as saying "obstacles play an important role" in regards to the racism she experienced in her lifetime.

== Career ==
Santa Cruz founded Cumanana, a theater company, Nicomedes in 1958 and co-managed it until 1961. In 1966, Victoria Santa Cruz founded the group Teatro y Danzas del Perú, which were group performances led by Cruz and other prominent Afro-Peruvian dancers that played a role in reclaiming lost heritages. Traditional, cultural, music played in the background as the dancers performed their pieces individually and as a group. The importance of these performances highlights the "recovery, creation, and recreation" of dying rhythms such as "the zamacueca, the landau and the alcatraz". Her artistic career as a performer, choreographer, and composer took her to new heights like being televised on Peruvian Television and being visited on her international tours. But the biggest international milestone was perhaps the group's performance at the 1968 Olympics in Mexico City. Recreations of such lost rhythms earned her a position amongst the Revolutionary Government of the Peruvian Military. Cruz was "appointed director of the newly established Escuela Nacional de Folklore" in 1969 and director of "the Conjunto Nacional de Folklore" in 1973. She continued touring with the group through big nations like the United States, Canada, and Western Europe.

Other accomplishments include her publication of the magazine Folklore, in which she describes the Conjunto's goal to "compile, preserve, research, and disseminate national folklore in the form of dance, music, songs, and musical instruments", and her position as a professor at Carnegie Mellon University (1982-1999).

== Education ==
Victoria Santa Cruz first attended the Université du Théâtre des Nations École Supérieur des Études Chorégraphiques at the age of 42 (1961-1965), where she studied theater and choreography "with such distinguished professors as the actor Jean-Louis Barrault, the playwright Eugène Ionesco, and the choreographer Maurice Béjart." While studying at the university in Paris, Cruz continued to demonstrate her interest to reclaim the loss of her cultural and ancestral memory by visiting Africa for the first time and creating the ballet La muñeca negra (The black doll, 1965)

== Artworks and performances ==
Malato (1961) - Musical/Play

Malato is a three act musical which showcased the relationship between the enslaved and their oppressor that was removed from the Peruvian history of slavery. The play was written, choreographed, and staged by Santa Cruz.

Cumanana (1970) - song

Cumanana (Kumanana) [1970] is the name of one of her more prominent songs because it evokes her past in the band with her brother Nicomedes. The term, as described by Victoria Santa Cruz, means "mix of Spanish and black things," which makes reference to her identity.

Me gritaron negra (1978) - poem/spoken word

She is known for her visual, lyrical poem Me gritaron negra (They Shouted Black At Me), show cased in the exhibition Radical Women: Latin American Art, 1960-1985 and at the Brooklyn Museum. This piece became prominent because of its social commentary on race, racism, and prejudice amongst the Latino community in regards to Afro-Peruvians.

The artist is also known for these lyrical and rhythmic performances/recreations:

La Magia del Ritmo (2004) - theater/play/musical performance

La Magia del Ritmo is a performance and rhythmic song presented by Victoria Santa Cruz in 2004, as part of the Peruvian Japanese theatric play. The artist's intent was to create a lively experience and connection amongst listeners/viewers by infusing theatrics with cultural and rhythmic music.

Ritmo, El Eternal Organizador (2004) - Book

The only book published by Santa Cruz and edited by Luis Rodriguez Pastor. This book reflected her personal views and gave a detailed understanding into her outlook on life.

Pa' Goza Con el Ritmo del Tambo (2014) - song

Pa' Goza Con el Ritmo del Tambo is another rhythmic, cultural song by the artist that highlights the pride of being Afro-Peruvian while showing appreciation towards el Tambo. This song is from her album Somos de Ébano y No de Marfíl published in 2014.

Las Lavanderas (2015) - song

Las Lavanderas is rhythmic and cultural song from her album Victoria Santa Cruz y Gente Morena released in 2015 as part of a collective. This song reveals some of the social commentaries around Afro-Peruvians that Victoria recognizes as struggles for many Afro-Latinos. In the song, dialogue includes an exchange between two individuals pointing out the neighborhood's Afro-Peruvian woman, calling her “Negra sucia” and “Negra idiota” which translates into dirty and idiot.

La Buñolera (2016) - song

La Buñolera is another example of the artist's taken pride for her identity as an Afro-Peruvian woman. This song is specifically geared towards "Afro Peruvanas," Afro-Peruvian women

== Exhibitions ==
- Radical Women: Latin American Art, 1960-1985
- Brooklyn Museum: Radical Women: Latin American Art, 1960-1985
- Primer Festival y Seminario Latinoamericano de Televisión in 1970
- Cali Festival, 1971

== Collections ==
Many of the artist's pieces were original or remade songs that now live as collections in CD's or online-accessible music. Access to her musical collections can be streamed through major platforms like Spotify, Apple Music, and Amazon. Her collections include:

- Poemas y Pregones Afro Peruanos (released) April 2, 2013) and includes her famous poem Me Gritaron Negra.

- Con Victoria Santa Cruz y Gente Morena (released October 2, 2015), includes her song Las Lavanderas.

- Victoria Santa Cruz: Orgullosa Afro Peruana (released May 11, 2016) and includes her biggest hits like Cumanana, La Buñolera, and Pa' Goza Con el Ritmo del Tambo.

== Awards and honors ==
- She received a scholarship by the French government and traveled to Paris to study choreography. Here, she succeeded as the creator and designer of the wardrobe for the play El Retablo de Don Cristóbal by Federico García Lorca.
- Best Folklorist, 1970
- Appointed Director of the National Folklore Ensemble of the National Institute of Culture in 1973

== Death ==
In her last interview, Victoria Santa Cruz responds to the question "what has racism taught you?" by stating "in a little while, I will leave this life... and I want to leave in peace, with my conscience clean, and we'll see what happens here. But everything is weakened, dislocated in the entire world. And everyone is losing because really, this is not how you fight."

She died on August 30, 2014, in Lima, Peru.
