= Nicomedes Santa Cruz =

Peruvian singer, songwriter and musicologist

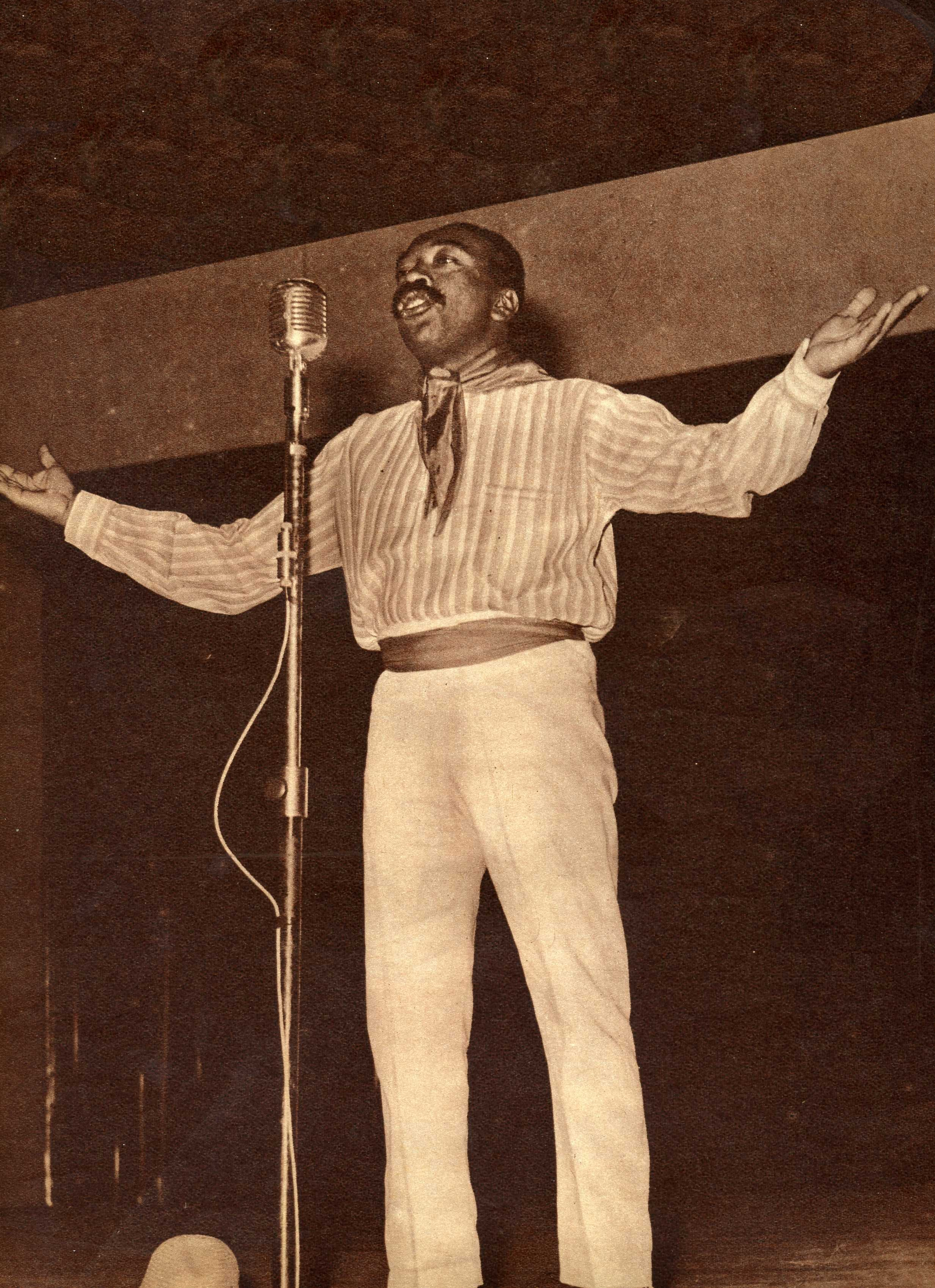
- Nicomedes Santa Cruz singing.
- Born: June 4, 1925; La Victoria, Lima Province, Peru
- Died: February 5, 1992 (aged 66); Madrid, Spain
- Occupations: Poet, composer, journalist, folklorist

Nicomedes Santa Cruz Gamarra (June 4, 1925 – February 5, 1992) was a Peruvian singer, songwriter and musicologist. He was primarily a decimista (or decimero), a singer of décimas. He researched most forms of Afro-Peruvian music and dance, becoming the leading ethnomusicologist in Peru.

== Biography ==
Santa Cruz was born in La Victoria District, Lima, Peru, to Nicomedes Santa Cruz Aparicio and Victoria Gamarra Ramírez, and was the ninth of ten siblings. After his schooling, it was decided that he would work as a blacksmith, which he did until 1956 when he left his workshop and traveled throughout Peru and Latin America, composing and reciting his poems. In 1945, he met Don Porfirio Vasquez (father of the singer Pepe Vazquez), who became a decisive influence on Santa Cruz's development as a decimero, a composer using the décima form. Porfirio Vasquez came to Lima in 1920 and was an early pioneer of the movement to regain the lost cultural identity of Afro-Peruvians.

In 1952, Nicomedes and his sister Victoria attended a performance of the Katherine Dunham Dance Company, where they were impacted by a rite of African fertility known as ‘Rites de Passage.’ Santa Cruz described the experience as the first positive demonstration of blackness in Peru. Santa Cruz assumed the task of reviving Afro-Peruvian folklore through a theater company he organized with his sister Victoria Santa Cruz (1959–1961), through radio broadcasts, and through his collaborations in the daily newspapers Expreso and El Comercio as well as other publications. In 1958, Conjunto Cumanana made its debut under the direction of Nicomedes on the criollo programs of the Radio Nacional del Peru. His sister, Victoria Santa Cruz joined him in 1959 as co-director and in 1959, with Conjunto Cumanana, he recorded the album Kumanana, followed in 1960 by Ingá and Décimas y poemas Afroperuanos. In this year Conjunto Cumanana opened their first production named Zanahary. It opened at Teatro La Cabaña on March 13 under the tutelage of the National Theatre of the Ministry of Public Education. In 1964 he recorded a four-album set, Cumanana. In 1967 he attended the Canción Protesta Encuentro in Cuba, and recorded his poem "Benny 'Kid' Paret, which was issued on the album Canción Protesta. Conjunto Cumanana also developed Conjunto Cumanana’s works were about the social issues of black people in Peru, internalized racism and inequality. They used the company to mentor young Afro-Peruvians to rediscover their blackness. Santa Cruz and his sister Victoria delivered a repertoire that separated the identities of Afro-Peruvians from the White Criollos. It also highlighted the contributions of Afro-Peruvians to the Criollo culture. Conjunto Cumanana presented comedies and dramas often set in the times of slavery or in historic Lima. Before Conjunto Cumanana, Santa Cruz joined the theatre company known as the Pancho Fierro Company (1956–1957), named after a painter who captured Afro-Peruvian dances in his works. They made their theater debut in 1956 at the Teatro Municipal de Lima.

In the 1960s and 1970s Santa Cruz published four poetry collections, many short stories, and two poetry collections: Décimas (1960), Cumanana (1964), Canto a mi Perú (Song to Peru) (1966), Ritmos Negros del Perú (Black Rhythms of Peru) (1971), Antología: décimas y poemas (Anthology: Decimas and Poems) (1971), and Rimactampu: rimas al Rimac (Rimactampu: Rhymes to the River Rimac) (1972). He also ventured into journalism, radio, and television. During his travels, he continued to participate in events promoting Afro-Peruvian folklore, notably his address at the first Black Arts Festival, held in Cañete, in August 1971. In 1974 he traveled for the first time to Africa, where in Dakar, Senegal, he participated in the symposium "Négritude et Amérique Latine" with his lecture "Aportes de las civilizaciones africanas al folklore del Peru". That same year he traveled to Cuba and Mexico, participating in a series of television programs, as well as later trips to Japan (1976), Colombia (1978), Cuba, Canción Protesta Encuentro (1967), Cuba (1979), Panama (1980).

In 1980 he moved to Madrid, where he lived until his death. In 1982 he began working as a journalist at Radio Exterior de España. In 1987 he began collaborating in preparing a series of LP record albums called Espana en su Folklore, a collection of songbooks from Spain and America. In 1988, he was diagnosed with lung cancer and underwent a successful medical procedure. In 1989 he taught a seminar on African culture in Santo Domingo (Dominican Republic) and the following year participated in the expedition Adventure 92, touring ports in Mexico and Central America. He also involved in many projects for the quincentennial commemoration of Columbus's arrival in the Americas.

He died after a recurrence of lung cancer on February 5, 1992, after surgery at the Clinical Hospital in Madrid.

== Legacy ==
June 4, the birthday of Nicomedes Santa Cruz, has since 2006 been celebrated as a Day of Afro-Peruvian Culture.

In 2010 the Peruvian hip-hop group Comité Pokoflo released a tribute song, "Tributo a Nicomedes", in their mixtape El Grito.

== Discography ==
- Gente Morena (1957)
- Nicomedes Santa Cruz y Su Conjunto Kumanana (1959)
- Ingá (1960)
- Décimas y Poemas (1960)
- Cumanana. Poemas y canciones (1964)
- Cumanana. Antología afroperuana (1965, 1970)
- Octubre mes morado (1964)
- Canto negro (1968)
- América negra (1972)
- Nicomedes en Argentina (1973)
- Socabón. Introducción al folclor musical y danzario de la costa peruana (1975)
- España en su folclor (1987)

== Written works ==
- Décimas (1959, 1960, 1966)
- Cumanana (1960)
- Canto a mi Perú (1966)
- Décimas y poemas: antología (1971)
- Ritmos negros del Perú (Buenos Aires, 1973)
- Rimactampu; rimas al Rímac (1972)
- La décima en el Perú (Lima, 1982)
- Como has cambiado pelona (Chincha, 1959)
- De ser como soy me alegro
- Acocachos Aprendí: La escuelita (1958)
