= Lucila Campos =

Peruvian singer

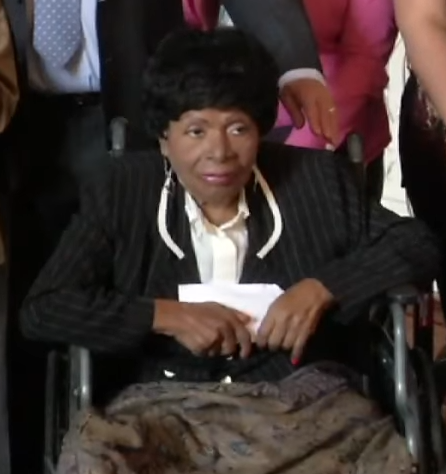
- Born: Clara Lucila Campos Marcial; August 16, 1938
- Died: December 12, 2016 (aged 78); Lima
- Other names: "la Morena Espectáculo" and "Reina de las Polladas"
- Occupation: singer

Clara Lucila Campos Marcial (16 August 1938 – 12 December 2016 in Lima) was a Peruvian singer known as "la Morena Espectáculo" and "Reina de las Polladas".

== Discography ==
- Toro Mata (Virrey, 1973)
- Perú Negro: Gran Premio del Festival Hispanoamericano de la Danza y la Canción (Virrey, 1973)
- La Jarana es con Lucila Campos (Virrey, 1974)
- Conjunto Perú Negro: Son de los Diablos (Virrey, 1974)
- Ritmo Negro: Con el conjunto de chocolate y su Eleggua (Virrey, 1975)
- ¡¡¡ Que Tal... Trio !!! (Iempsa, 1980)
- Valseando Festejos (Iempsa, 1981)
- Seguimos Valseando Festejos (Iempsa, 1982)
- El Sabor de Lucila Campos (Iempsa, 1984)
- Quimba, Lisura y Sabor (Virrey, 1985)
- Sabor...y más Sabor (Virrey, 1988)
