= Pancho Fierro =

Peruvian painter

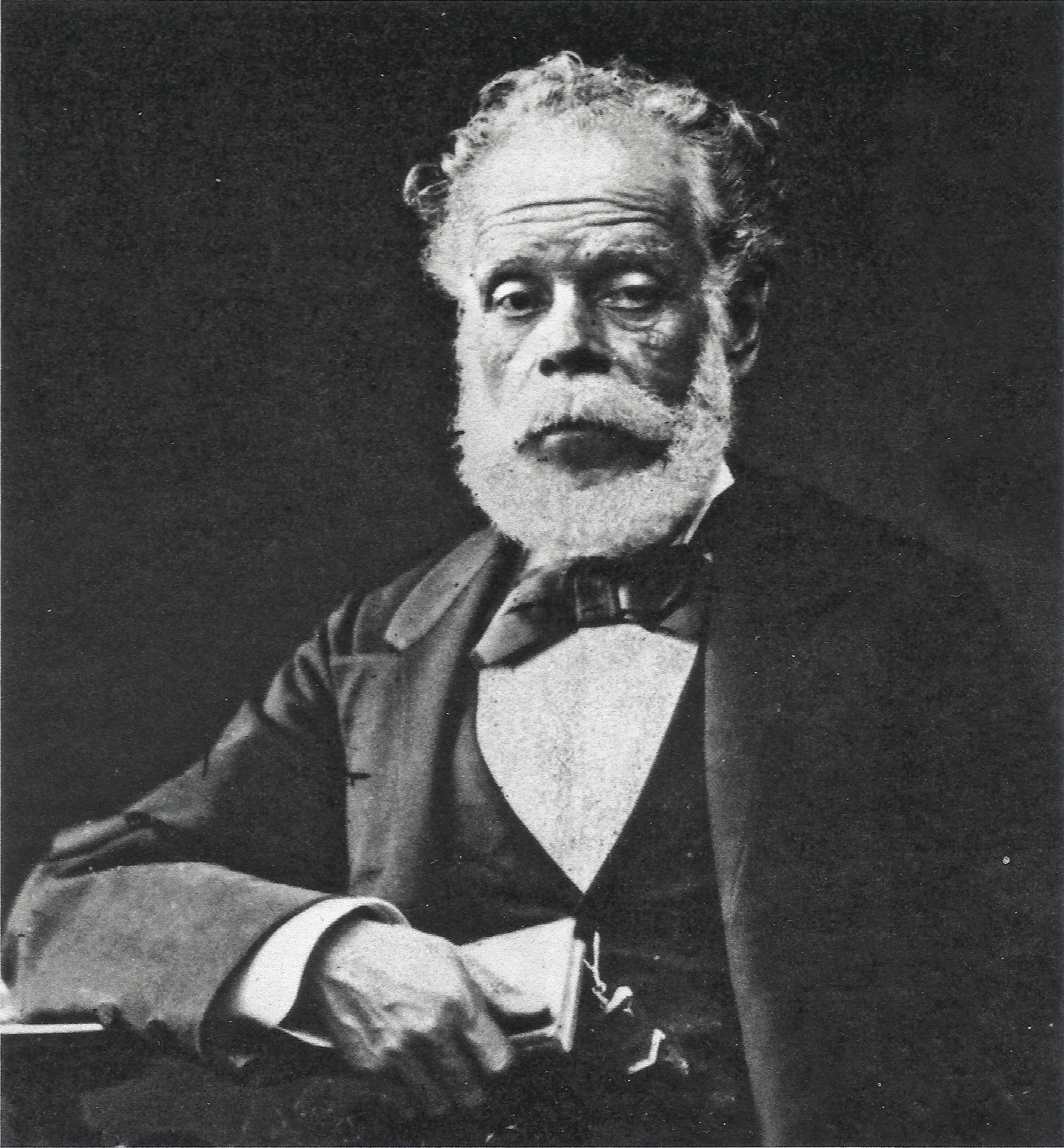
Pancho Fierro (c. 1870), photograph by Eugenio Courret

Francisco Fierro Palas, called "Pancho" Fierro (c. 1807/1809 – 28 July 1879), was a Peruvian painter, known primarily for his costumbrista watercolors, which depict his country's life and customs.

== Biography ==
Fierro was born in Lima. He was baptized on 5 February 1809, the son of Nicolás Rodríguez del Fierro, a priest, and a slave from the household of Nicolás' father, Don Antonio, a Colonel in the Militia Battalion. He had been manumitted upon his birth, following a rule that said no son of a Spaniard could be born a slave, but was raised by his mother's family.

There is no record of him receiving any artistic training, so he was probably self-taught. He married in 1828 and made his living by painting signs, making posters for bullfights and molding statues for nativity scenes. He also painted wall murals, all of which have been destroyed or covered over.

Today, he is remembered for his watercolors, painted on sign cards, depicting everyday scenes from Peruvian life. He created over 1200 of them and their popularity produced many imitators. The writer Ricardo Palma owned a large collection which his heirs gave to the City of Lima. They are now on display at the Pinacoteca Municipal Ignacio Merino. The captions were provided by Palma, as Fierro may have been illiterate. Other large collections were acquired by the French painter Léonce Angrand and the Russian ethnographer Leopold von Schrenck, whose collection is now at the "Museum of Anthropology and Ethnography" in the Kunstkamera, Saint Petersburg. He also painted Juan Jose Cabezudo, a gay chef from Lima.

According to an obituary in El Comercio, he died of paralysis in a hospital in Lima on Peruvian Independence Day.

== Selected watercolors ==
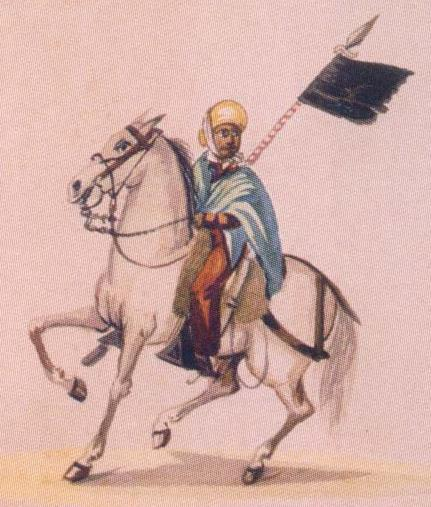
Peruvian Montonera

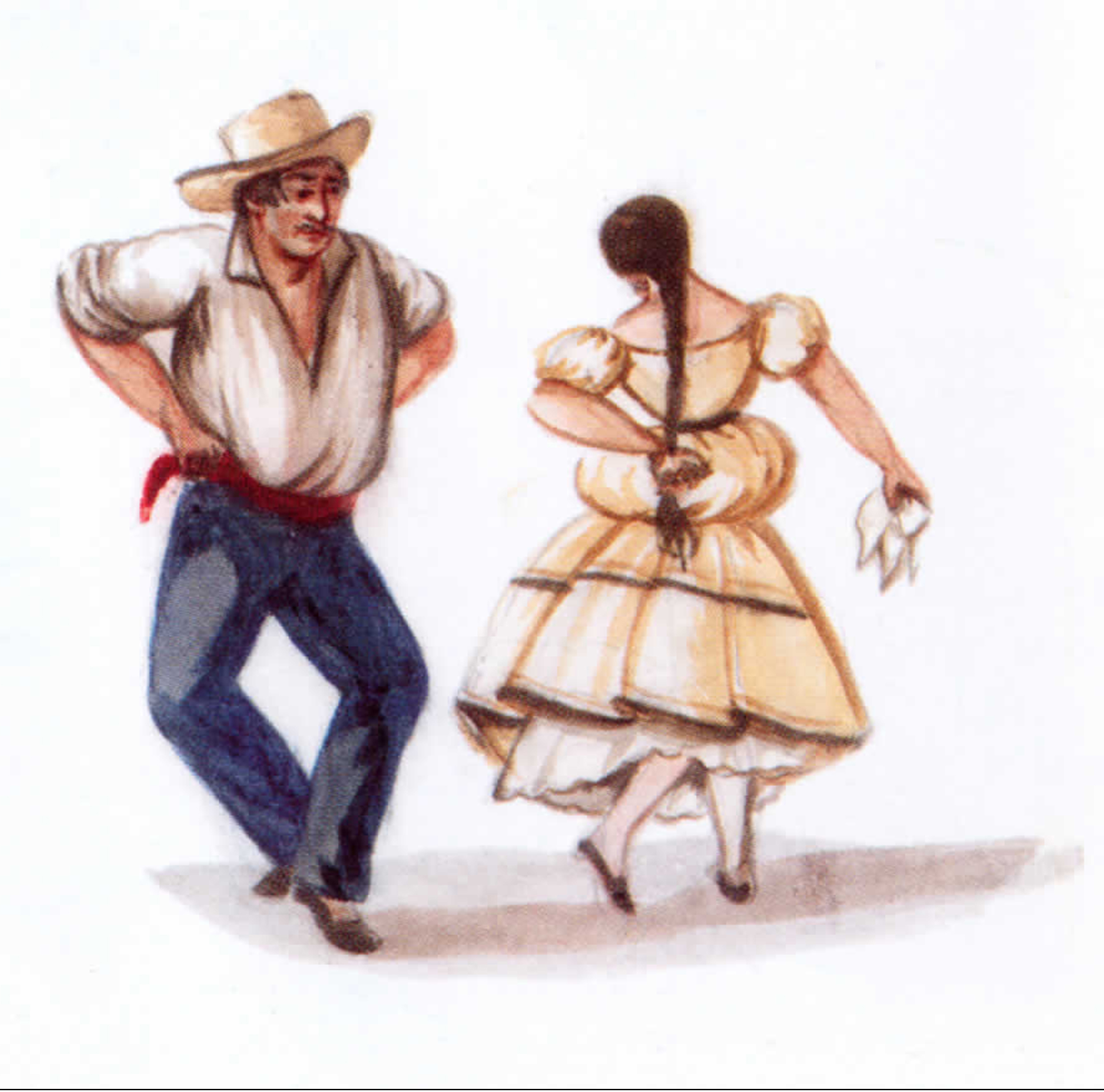
Dancing the Marinera

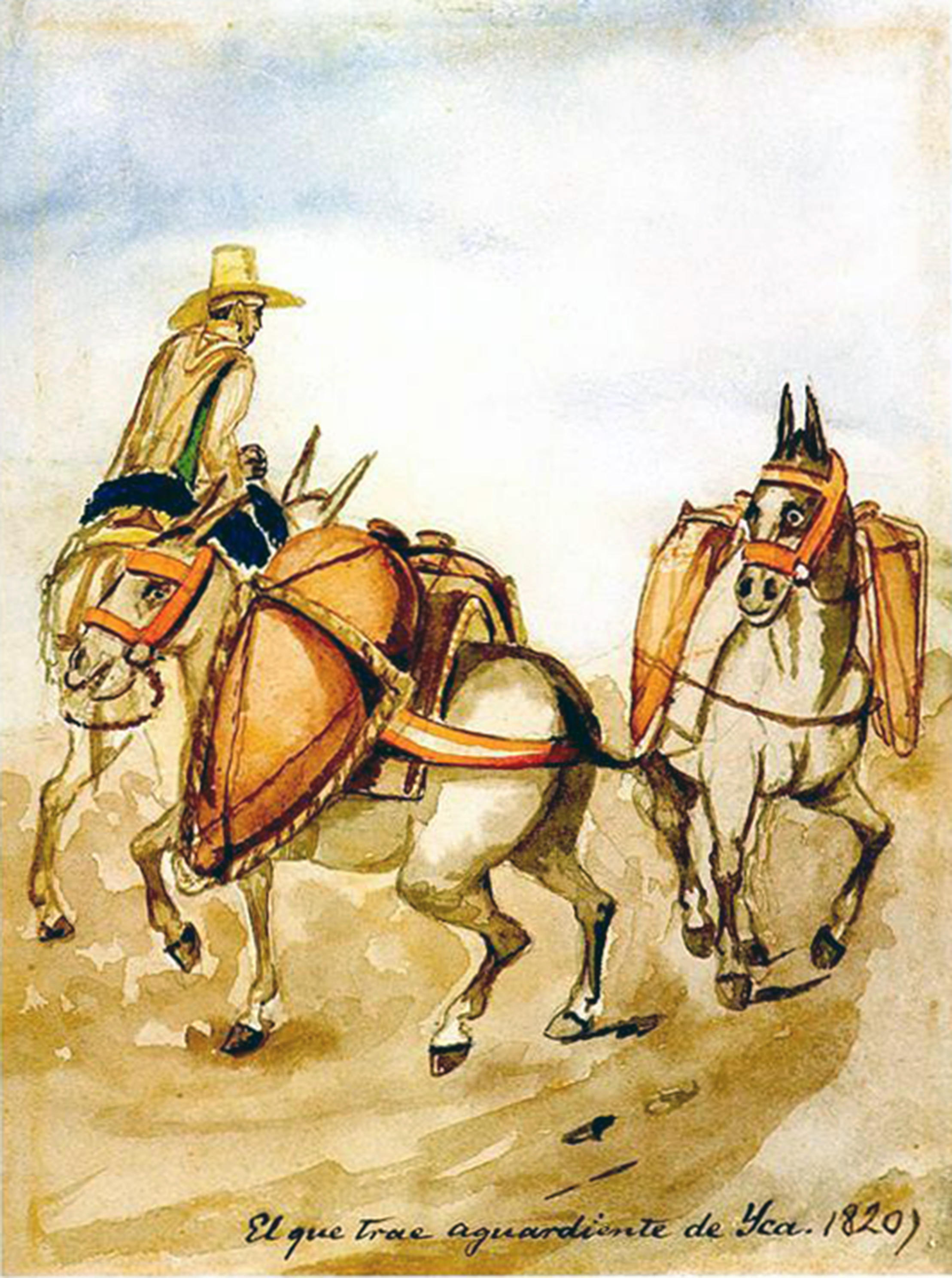
Carrying Aguardiente
from Ica

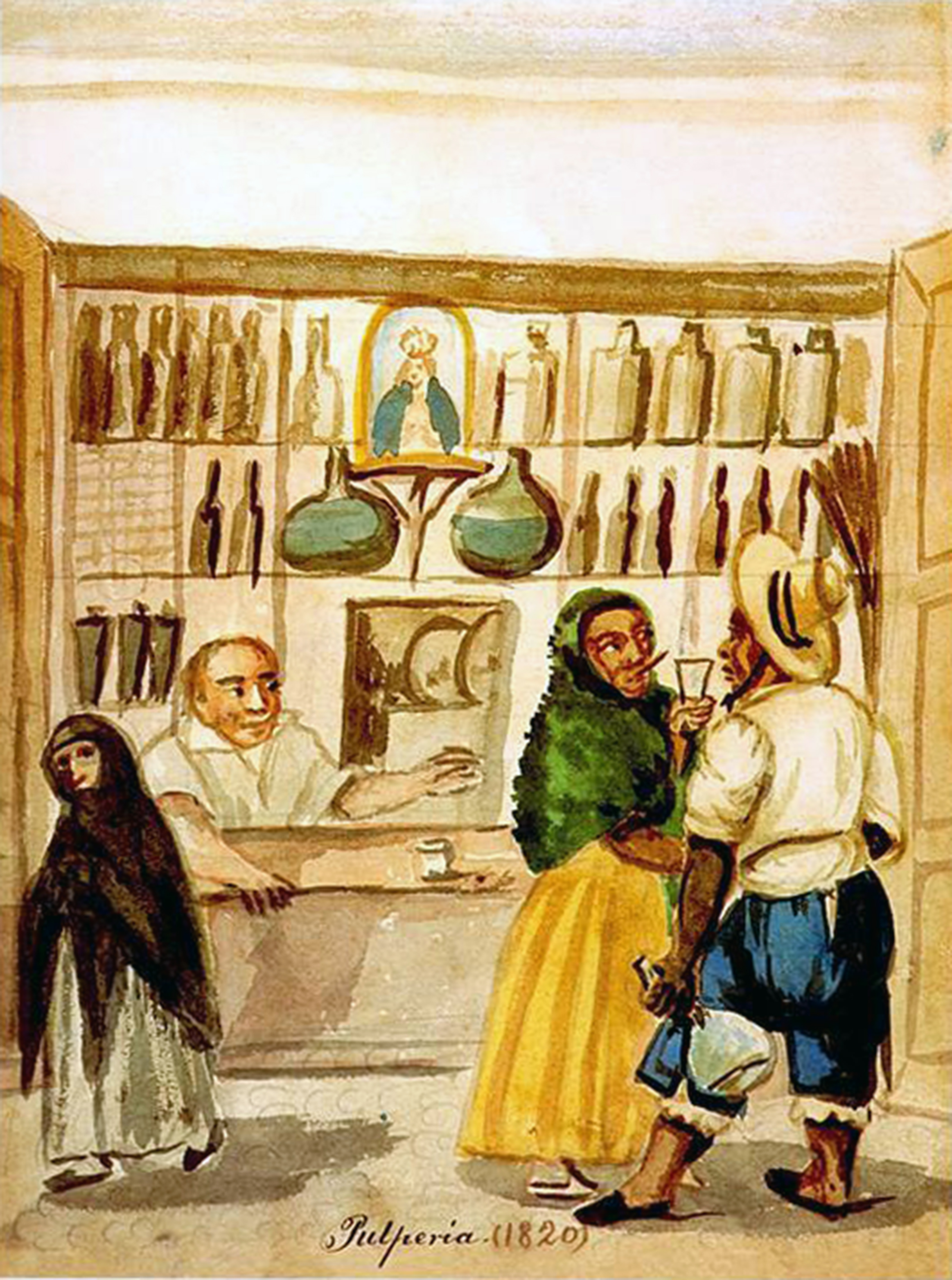
Pulperia

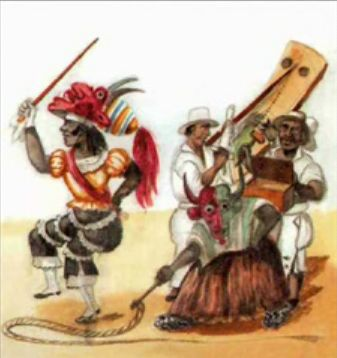
"Son de los Diablos"

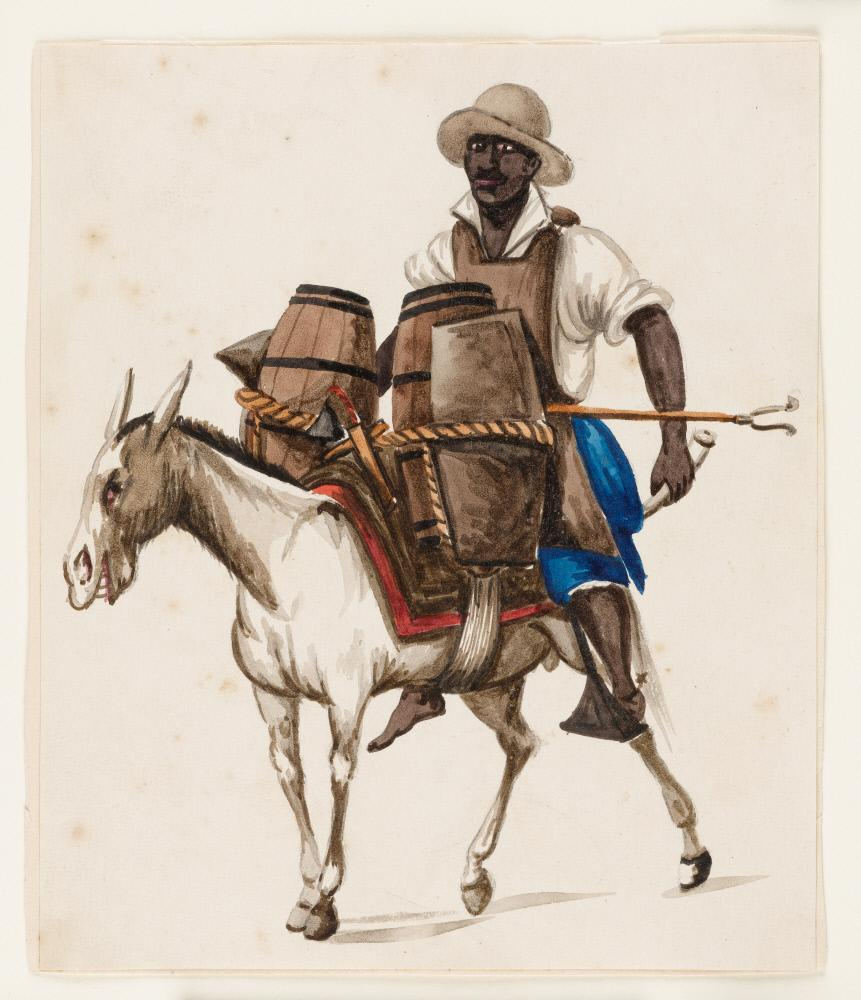
Water seller

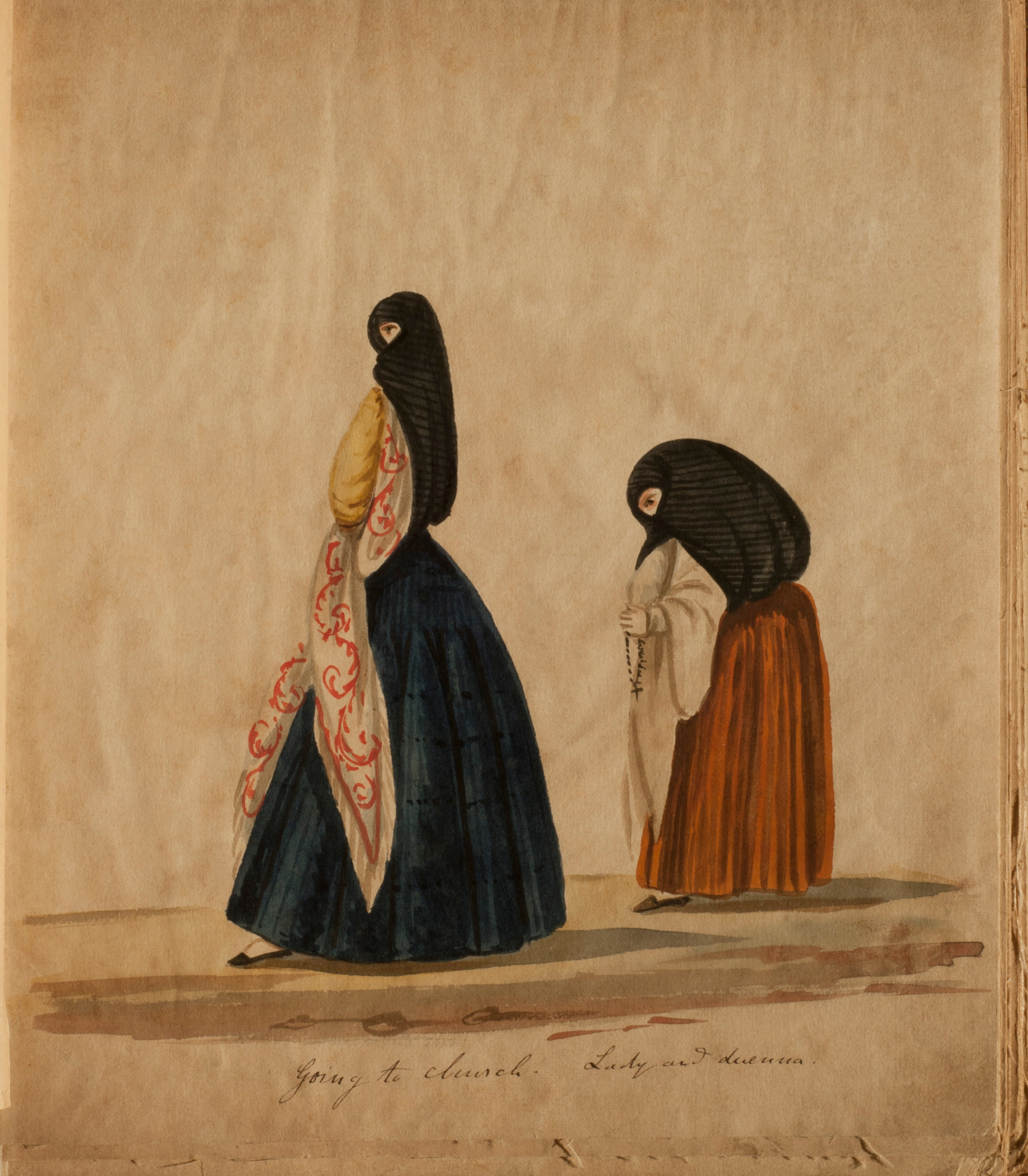
Tapadas limeñas

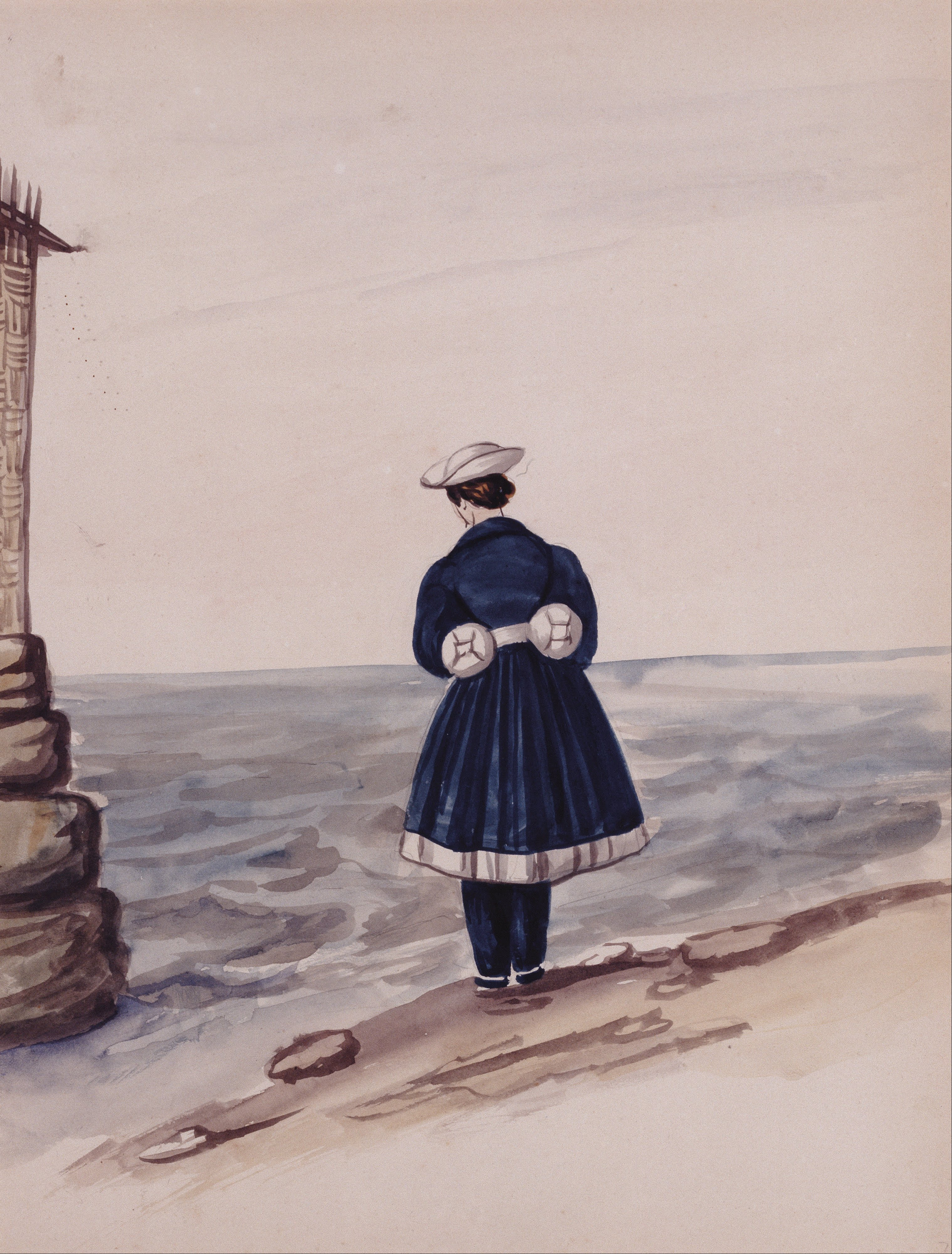
Lady bathing at Chorrillos

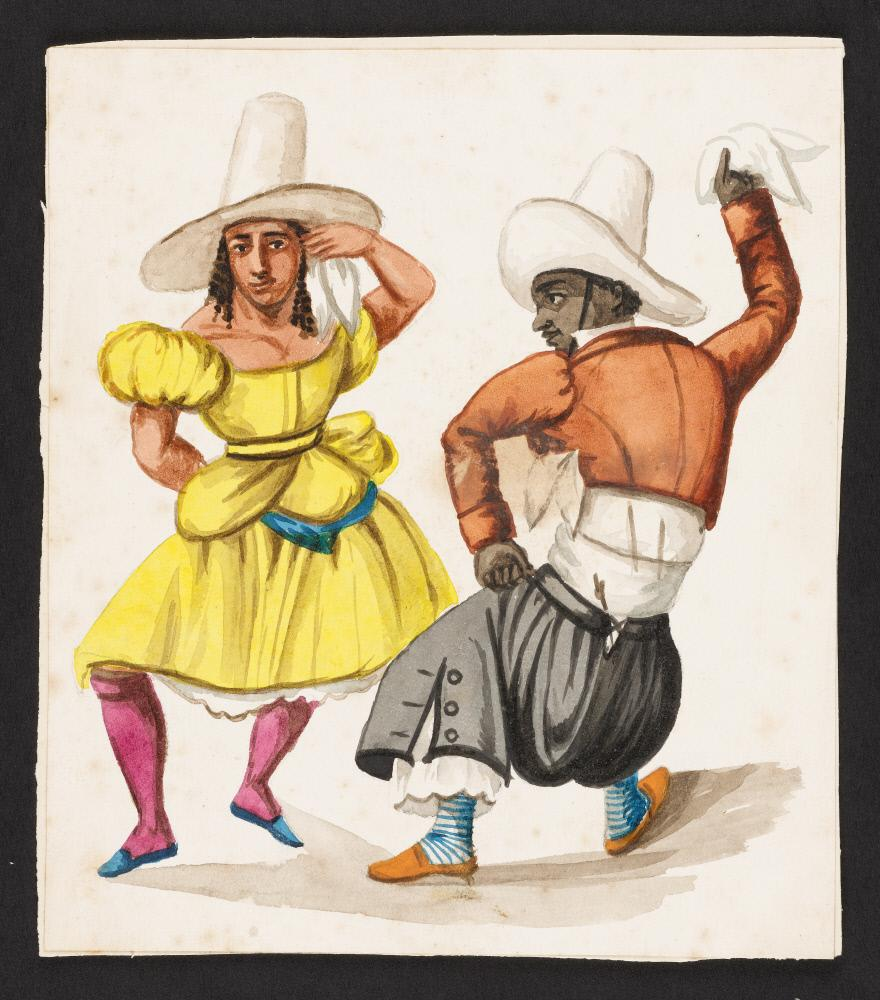
Afro-Peruvians dancing the Zamacueca
