= Tapada limeña =

Style of dress in Lima, Peru

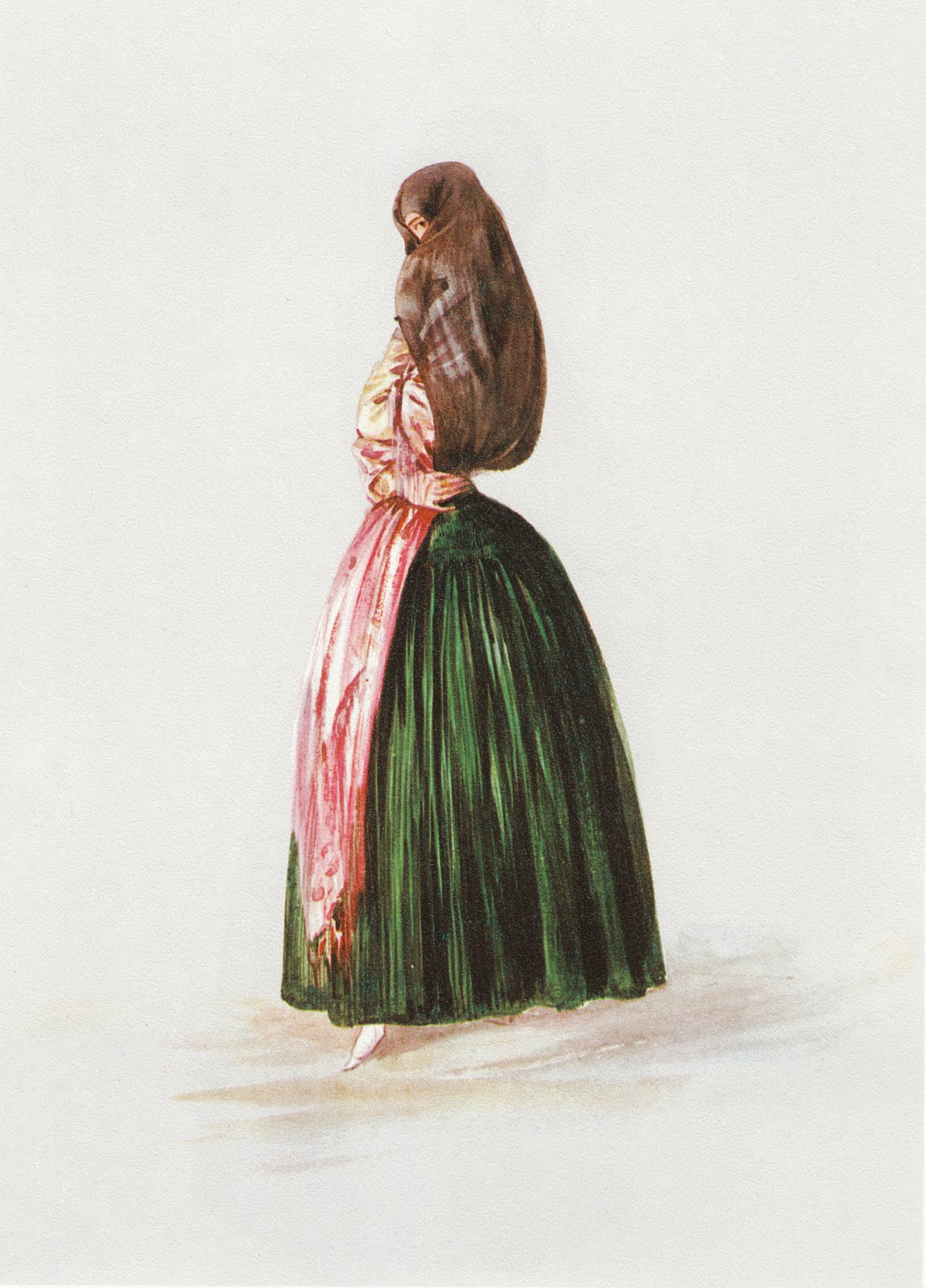
A tapada limeña in the early 19th century by Johann Moritz Rugendas

Tapada limeña (means "Liman [fem.] covered one") was the denomination used at the time of the Viceroyalty of Peru and the first years of the Republic to designate women in Lima who covered their heads and faces with comfortable silk mantones, revealing just one eye. It was introduced in the 16th century and continued well into the 19th century. Its use spread from Lima, "City of the Kings", to other important cities in the region. In Lima, the custom remained until well into the Republic, when French fashions relegated it.

== Background ==
In 1583, the Archbishop of Lima Toribio de Mogrovejo rejected the Lima custom of women wearing the saya and the cloak in the capital. This occurred during the Third Liman Council, which he presided over, leading to a censorship that the Cortes of 1586 confirmed during the reign of Philip II of Spain. It was agreed that the offenders would be fined 3,000 maravedís. The fear of this custom, already widespread among Liman women and which had generated many misunderstandings and much confusion, made the authorities suspect that the first cases of transvestism in the Viceroyalty were taking place.

== Origin ==
The use of the saya and the cloak, components of the tapada limeña, appeared in Lima around 1560. Its origin is said to have been Moorish because of its similarity to clothing worn by Muslim women. However, a theory of a Castilian origin was later established.

The first official descriptions of the clothing were not very kind to its wearers:

"The use of covering women has come to such an extreme that great offenses to God and notable damage to the republic have resulted from it, because that form does not recognize the father to the daughter, nor the husband to the wife. nor brother to sister..."

There were many ordinances after this act of the Cortes of 1586, but none could dissuade the Liman women.

== Characteristics ==
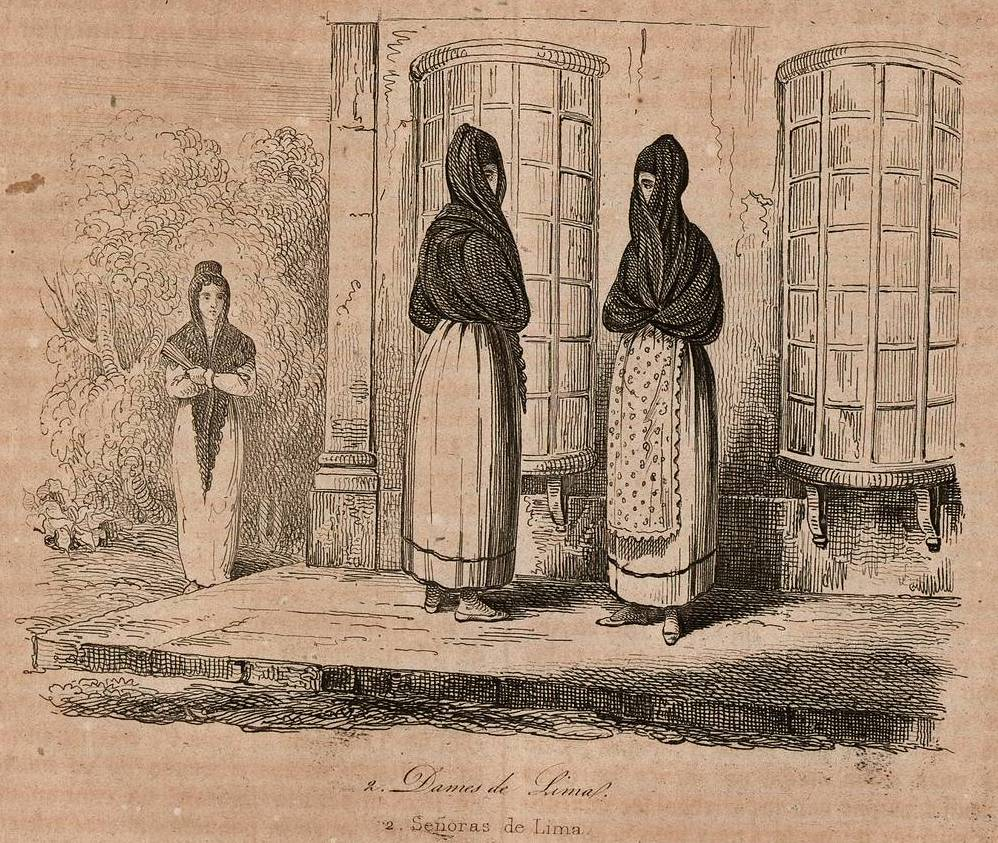
Tapadas limeñas in an 1842 engraving by d'Orbigny and Benoît. Museum of the Americas, Spain.

The tapada grew to connote insinuation, coquetry, prohibition, and seduction. However, it was still a dress: the saya outlined the hips, and the cloak covered the head and face, except for a single eye. The tapada was a symbol of the freedom of Liman women and this symbol was used to distinguish themselves from women of other classes and roots (races). Any face could be behind the cloak, and there were likely many occasions when boys or old men squandered compliments on their sisters-in-law, mothers-in-law, mothers, or daughters who could hide their true identity behind their cloaks.

The saya was a long, large silk skirt, colored blue, brown, green, or black, and secured with a belt. It was not uncommon for false hips to be worn underneath. Underneath this skirt, one could see the small foot (shod with an embroidered satin shoe) that colonial Lima women were known for. The cloak was also made of silk, tied at the waist and up the back to cover the head and face, revealing only one eye and perhaps the arms. This cloak was usually a simple fabric so that the tapadas would not stand out in public, and the wearer would retain anonymity.

== Political use of the saya ==
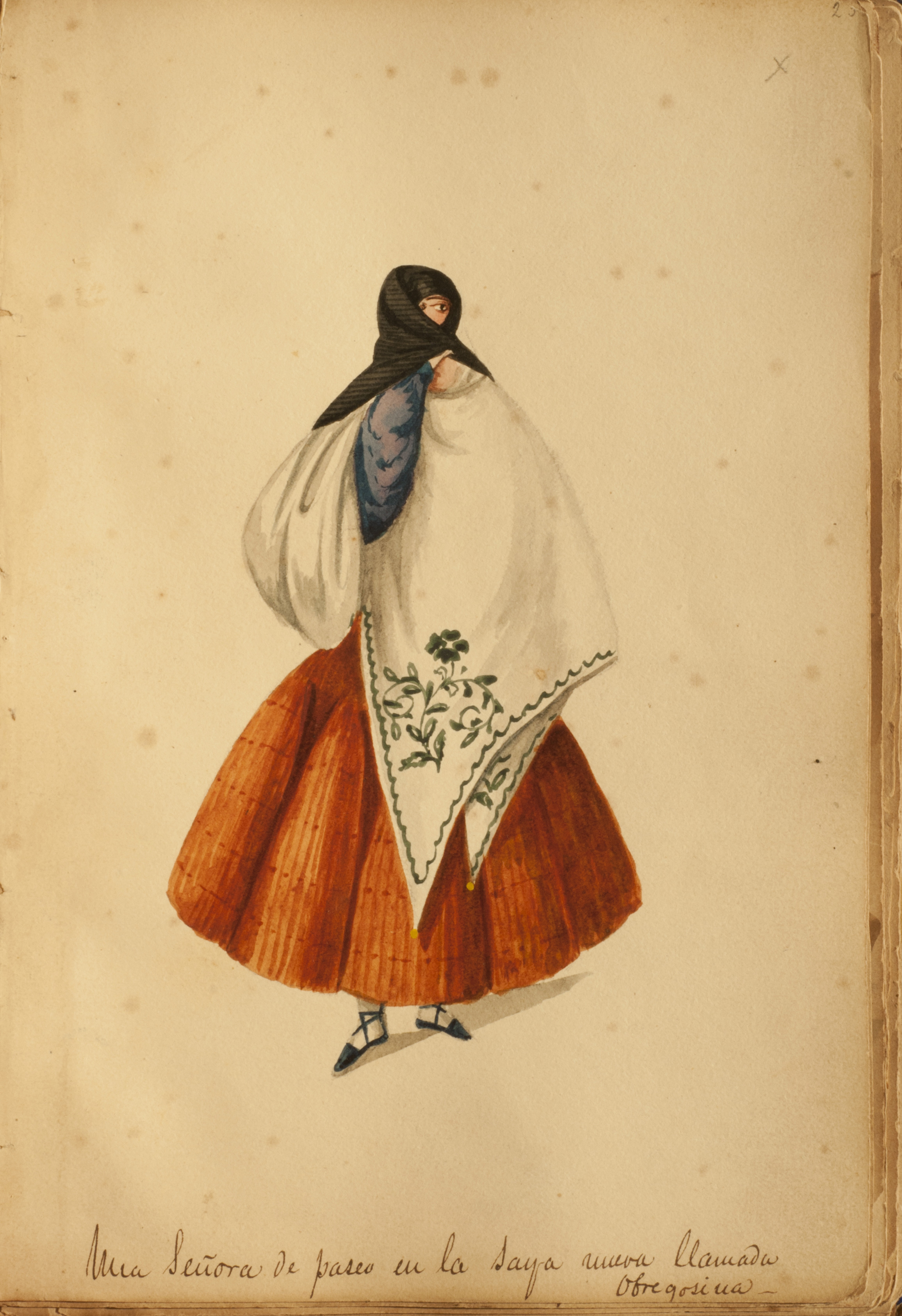
A Lady Walking with the New Saya Called Obregosina. Watercolor by Pancho Fierro, c. 1865 – c. 1870. Museo Nacional de Bellas Artes, Buenos Aires.

Over time, the varieties of costumes went hand in hand with the political climate, which the tapadas exploited to favor their caudillos. Felipe Santiago Salaverry with the saya salaverrina, Agustín Gamarra with the saya gamarrina, Luis José de Orbegoso with the saya orbegosina.

The tapadas limeñas were an icon in ancient Lima, an original presence that did not exist in any other city in Hispanic America. The insinuating game, a symbol of secrecy and perhaps of incipient female freedom, caught the attention of visitors passing through the capital city over the three hundred years that the clothing was worn. In the 19th century, they were painted by the Frenchman Leonce Angrand, the German Johann Moritz Rugendas, and the Liman mulatto Pancho Fierro, as well as staged by Manuel Ascencio Segura in his satirical work La saya y el manto.

For her part, in Peregrinaciones de una paria (1838), Flora Tristan wrote about the saya:

"It is made of different fabrics according to the hierarchy of ranks and the diversity of fortunes (...). Only in Lima can they be done and the women of Lima pretend that you have to be born in Lima to be able to be a worker in saya".

— Flora Tristan, Peregrinaciones de una paria, 1838

== Decline ==
Contrary to the opinion of some specialists, the tapada limeña was not a fashion because its resistance to change and attachment to tradition denote a stability and comfort that allowed gossip, intrigues, and other Lima customs. However, after three hundred years of validity, the tapada was disappearing, and by 1860, the French fashion had displaced the saya and the mantle.

== Gallery ==
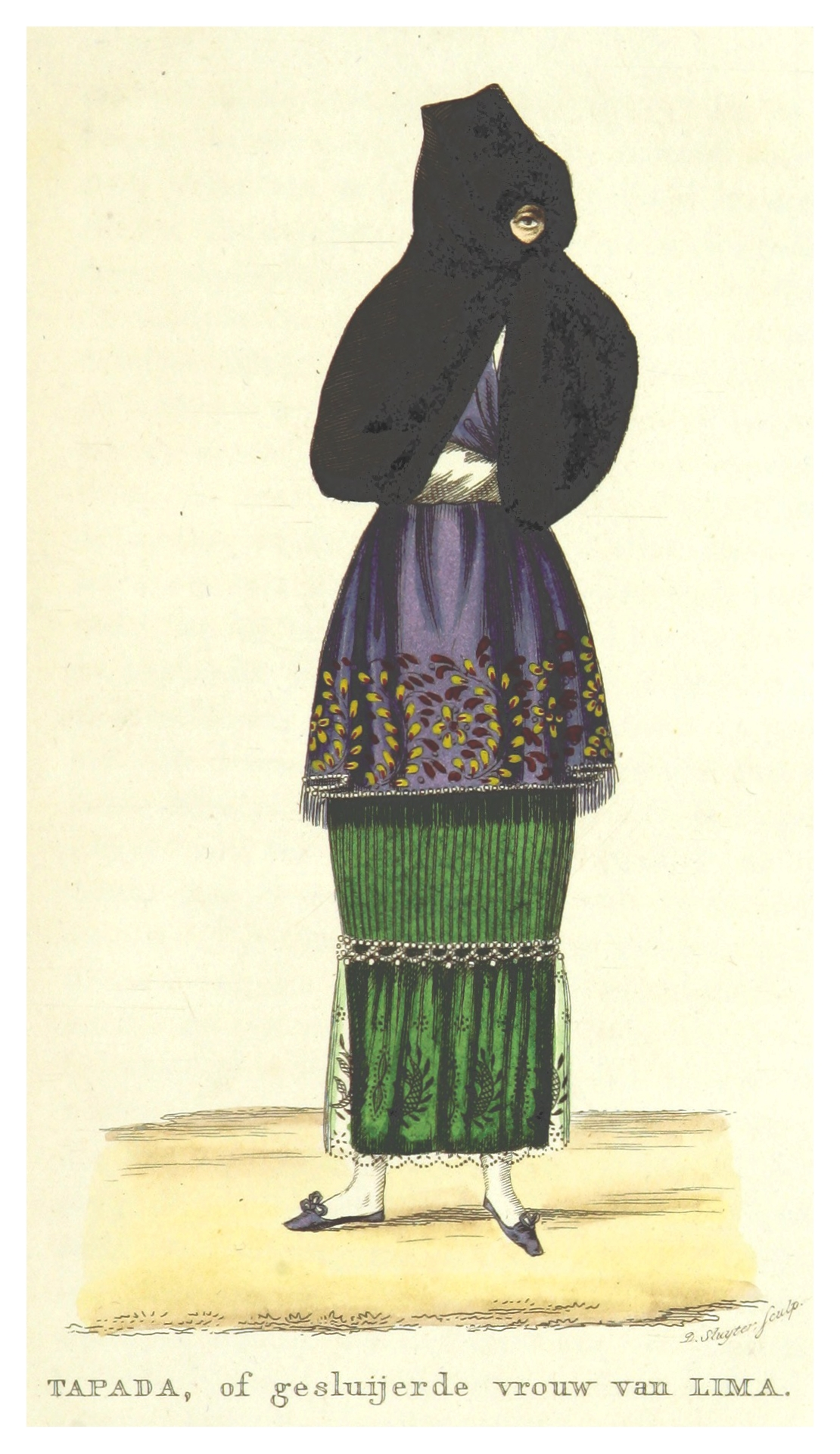
Tapada limeña c. 1835 by Jacobus Boelen. British Library

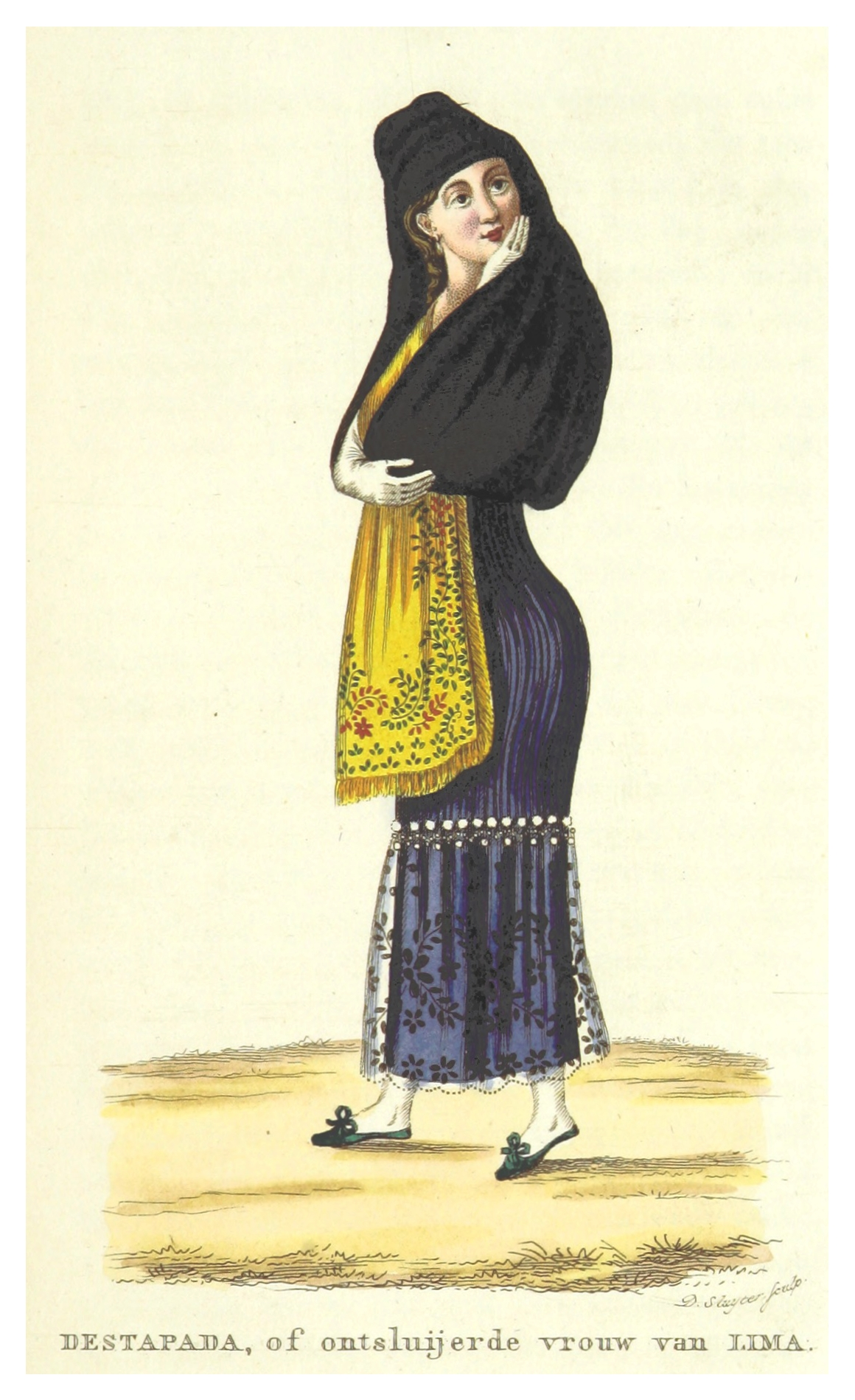
Destapada c. 1835 by Jacobus Boelen. British Library

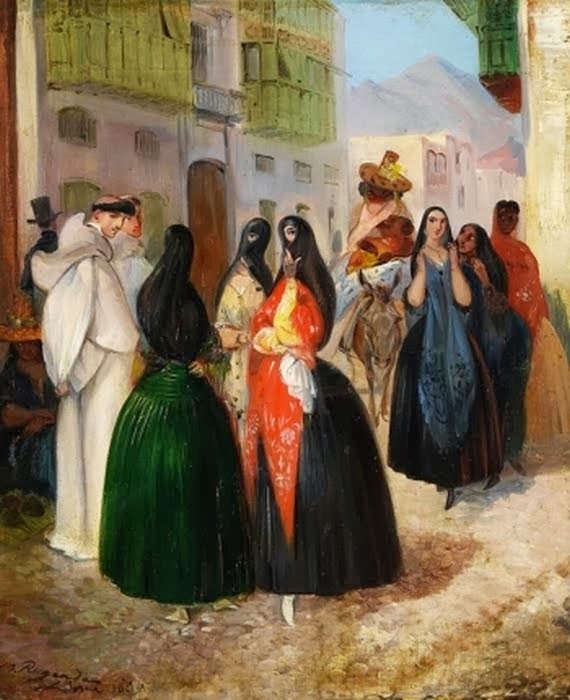
Lima Street Scene, c. 1844 by Johann Moritz Rugendas

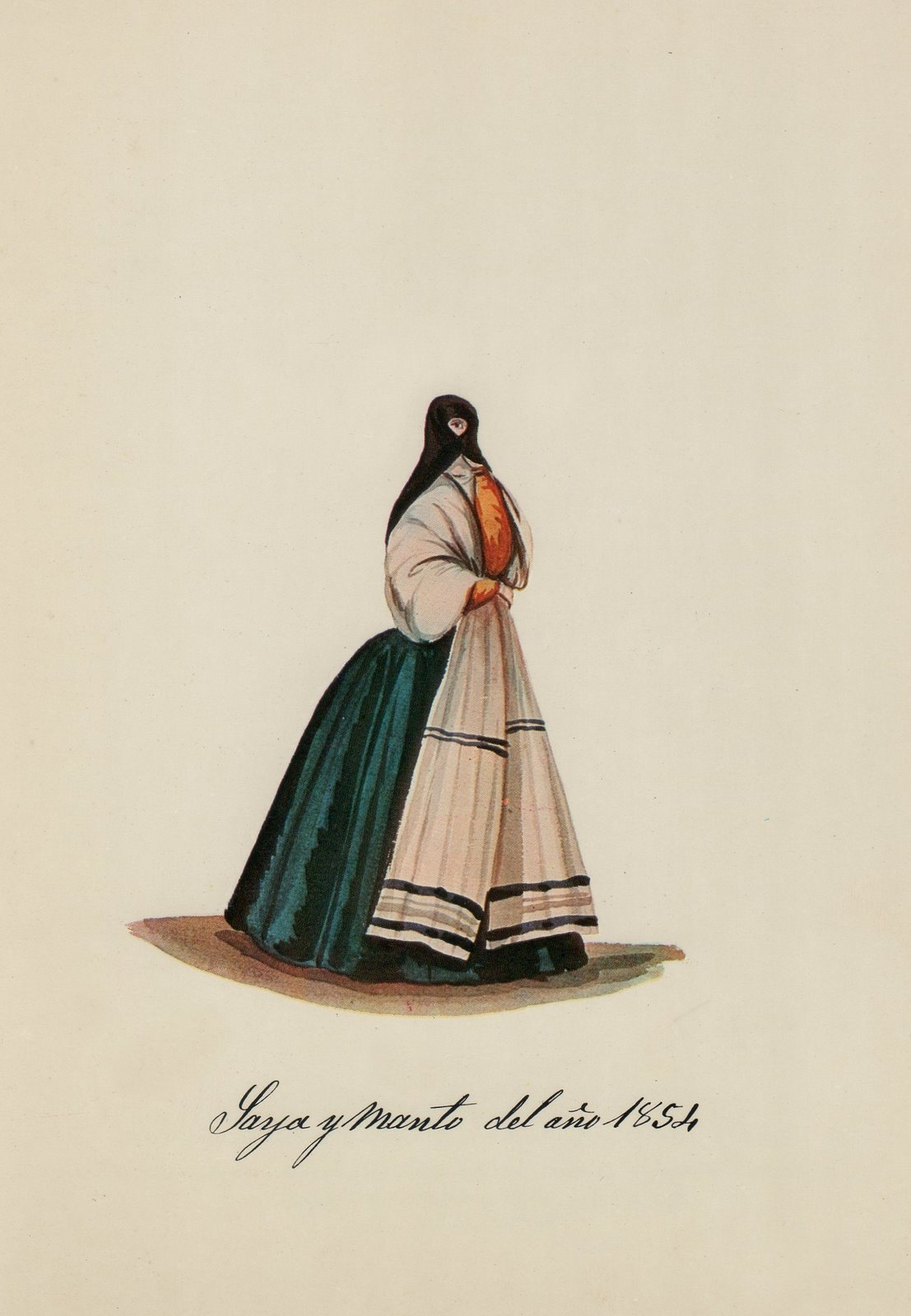

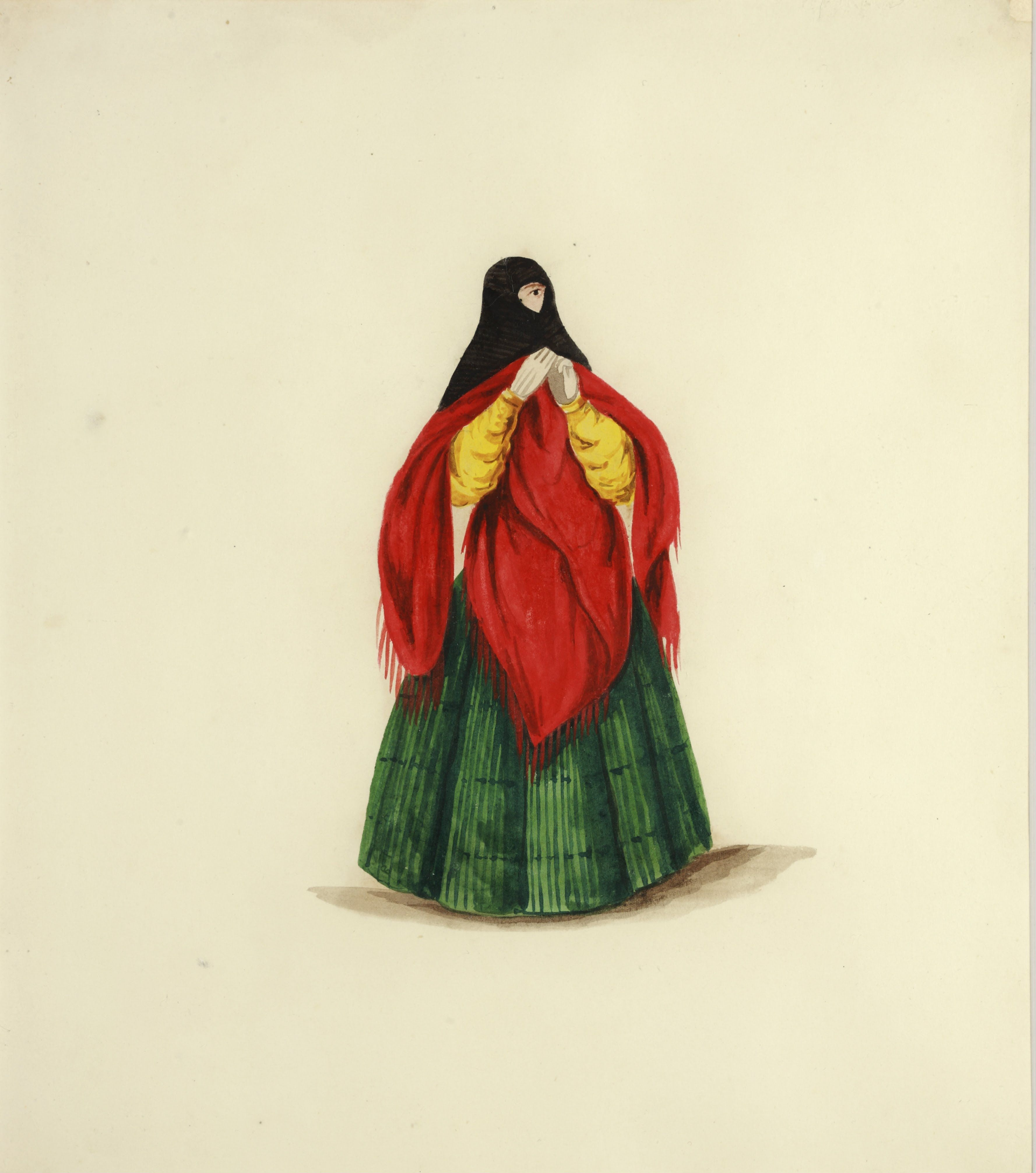
Standing Tapada by Pancho Fierro. Ignacio Merino Municipal Art Gallery, Lima.

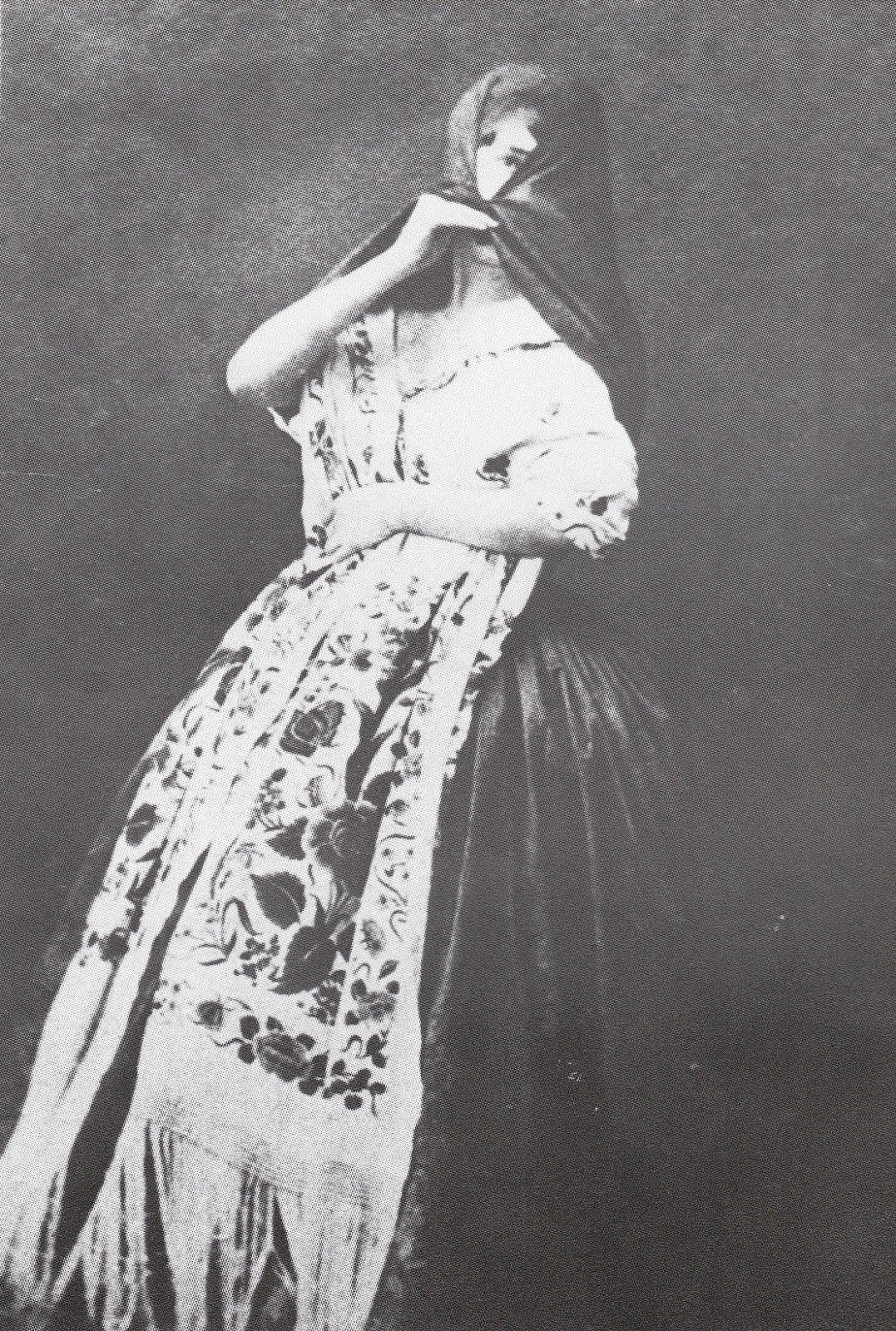
Photograph by Eugène Maunoury, c. 1865

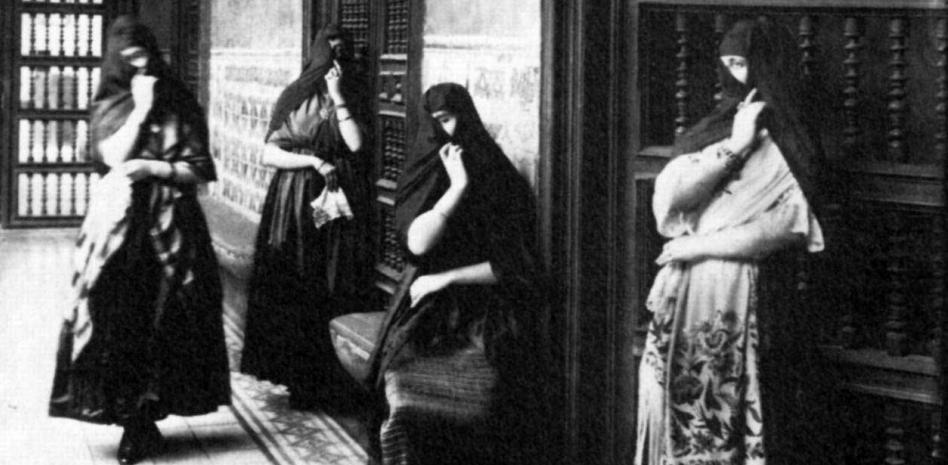
Tapadas limeñas (Lima) in 1902 by Eugène Courret

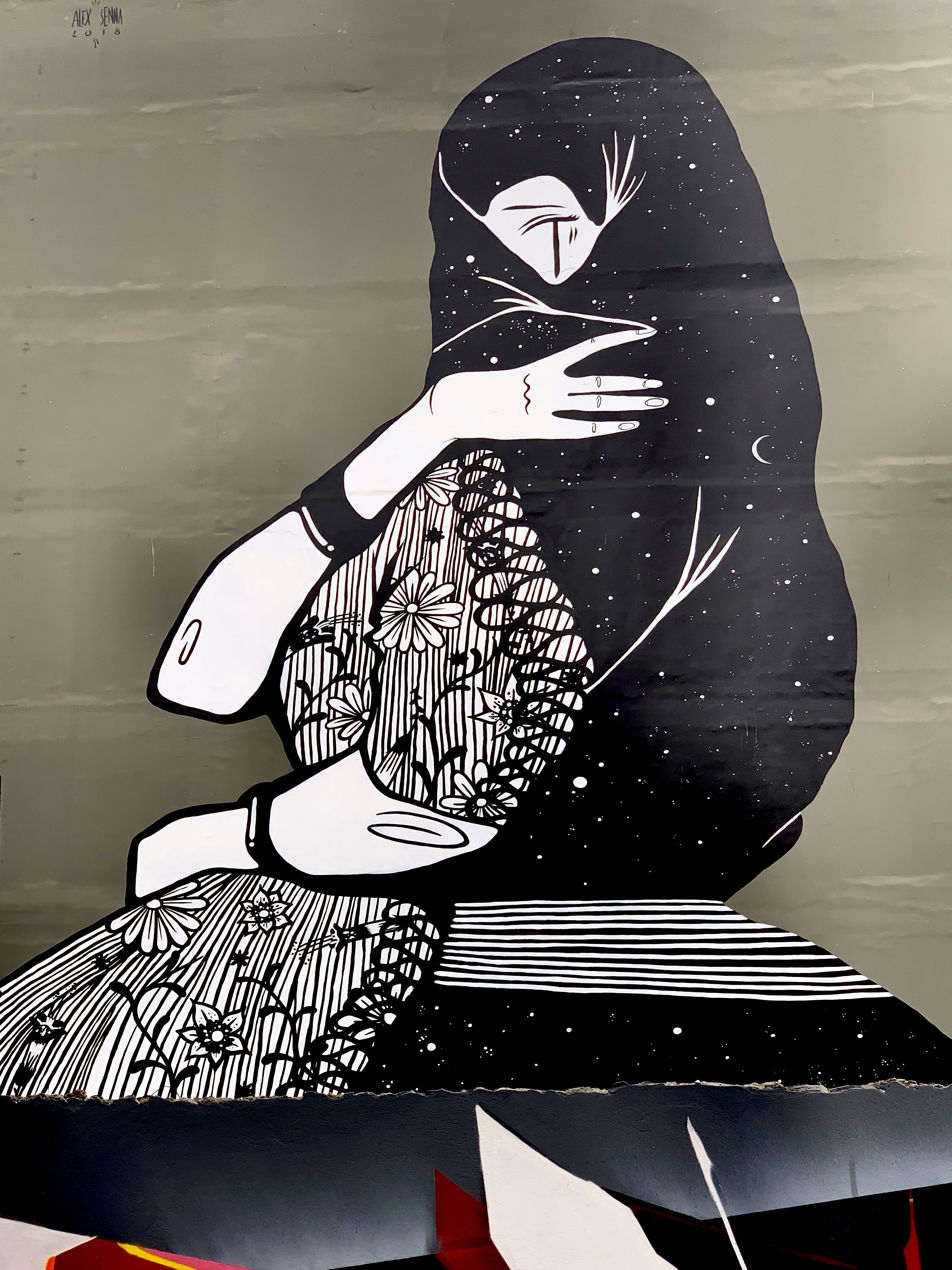
Mural of a tapada limeña by Alex Senna, painted in 2018.

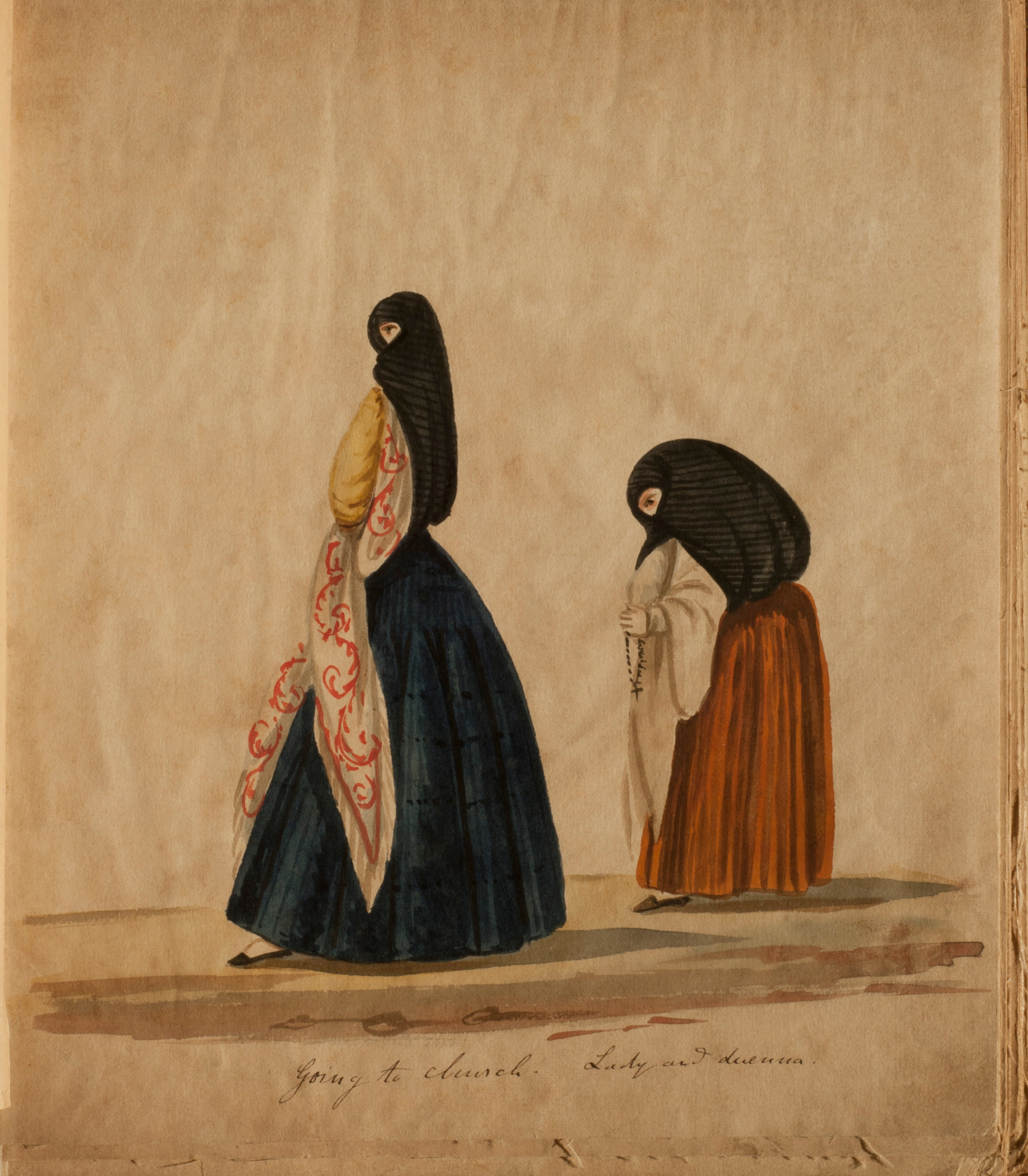
Going to Church by Pancho Fierro, c. 1850 – c. 1860

== Bibliography ==
- Basadre Grohmann, Jorge (2005). Historia de la República del Perú [History of the Republic of Peru] (in Spanish). Lima.
