= Pulpería =

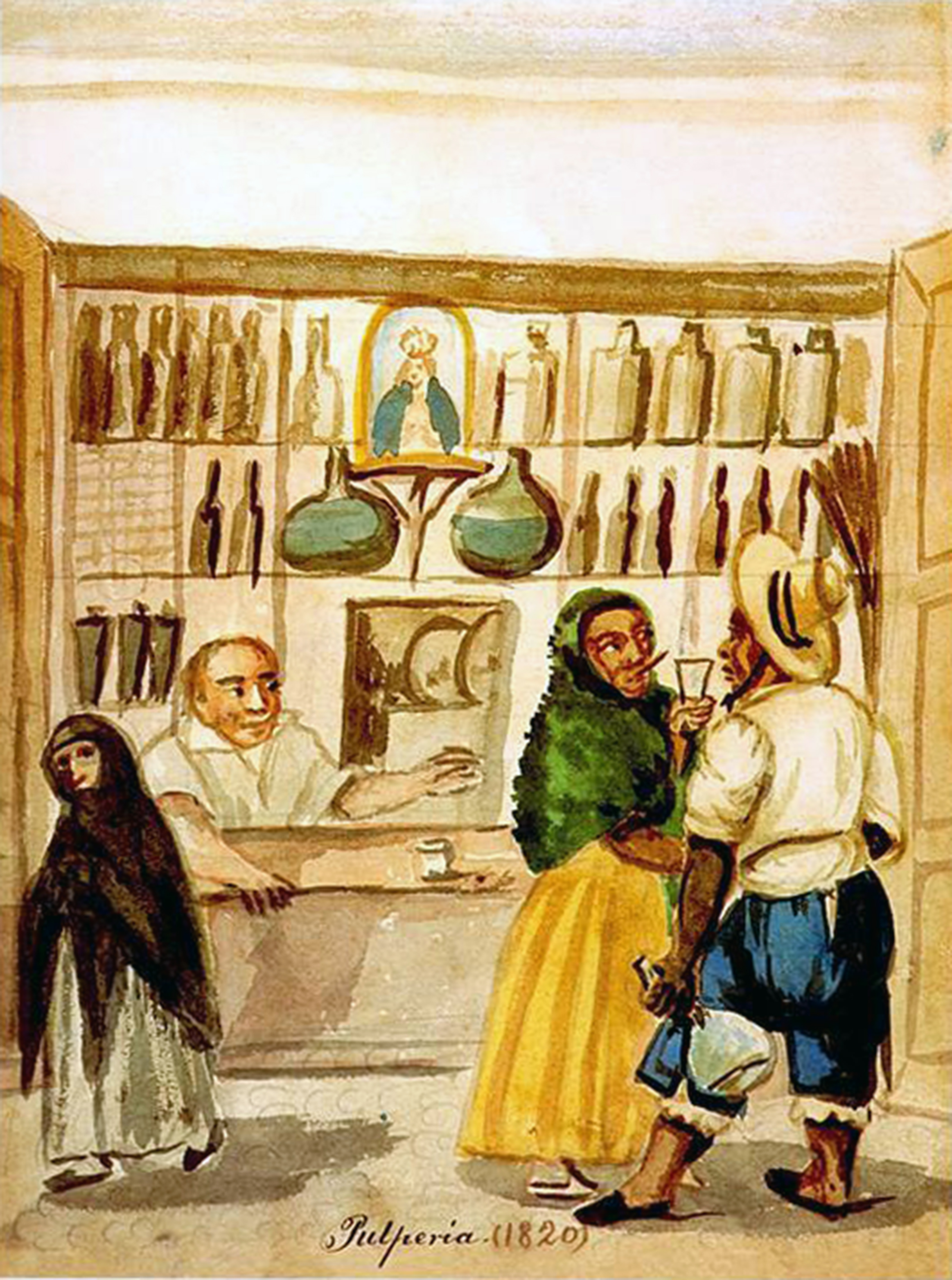
A Peruvian pulpería in 1820. Watercolor by Pancho Fierro

Pulpería was the Spanish name given to company stores and dining facilities in parts of South America, notably in the industries that extracted sodium nitrate from caliche deposits between 1850 and 1930 in Northern Chile in the current regions of Tarapaca and Antofagasta. The term was used in the Spanish colonial period in South America.

In Tarapacá and Antofagasta, the settlements of the nitrate companies were called “Oficinas Salitreras” or “Saltpeter villages”, located on the large and arid Pampa del Tamarugal and Atacama Desert. Due to the extreme conditions of the desert, traveling and providing supplies across was difficult. Therefore, the companies founded small villages and provided lodging, water and food for their workers. These self-sufficient installations included areas for the extraction and processing of niter, on-site mining center management, worker’s housing, pulperías, churches, schools, recreation centers, and entertainment.

The pulperías were an establishment that combined the services of the general stores and the Wild West barroom of the United States in the nineteenth century. Instead of using normal currency, the payment system of the wages was through tokens to obtain food rations valid only in the company store. This system of tokens included fixed prices established by the company to guarantee social and labor benefits to their workers and maintain a certain level of labor stability. However, in the long term, the fixed price system was ineffective in controlling the rising inflation. Moreover, every pulpería had different tokens. More than 2000 different tokens from “oficinas salitreras” were known, forming one of the more interesting sets of mining numismatic at world-wide level. As a consequence, inconsistency in the token system and failures of the impracticality of the long term price fixed system forced the companies to change the token system to directly paying cash to the workers.

These mining centers were home to thousands of workers and their families from Chile, Bolivia, Peru, and Argentina in the late 19th century and early 20th century. However, the exploitation of the natural resource of nitratine flourished between 1842 (when the usefulness of nitrate was discovered) and 1930 when synthetic nitrate was invented. With the declining sale of nitrate, most of these mining centers were abandoned, causing a massive exodus of workers and leaving ghost towns in the desert.

The pulpería system remained in use by the copper mining industry for a limited time up until the 1990s. However, pulperías have since been eradicated in all the mining industries of Chile.

== Readings ==
- Vergara, Angela (2012). "Precios fijos y raciones: la Anaconda Copper Company en Chile entre 1932 y 1958" [Fixed prices and rations: the Anaconda Copper Company in Chile between 1932 and 1958]. Investigaciones de Historia Económica (8): 135–143.
