= Juan José Cabezudo =

Peruvian chef

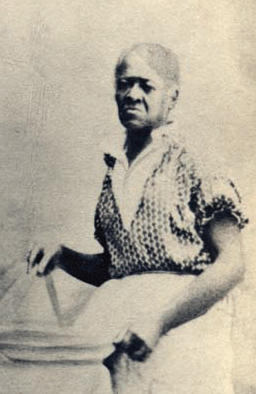
- Photograph by Eugenio Courret
- Born: c. 1800
- Died: 1860; Chorrillos, Peru
- Occupation: Chef

Juan José Cabezudo, also known as "El maricón" or "Comesuelas" (c. 1800 – 1860) was a famous Afro-Peruvian cook with a food stall in Lima's Plaza Mayor, during the first half of the 19th century. Travelers, such as Max Radiguet, writers, such as Ricardo Palma, costumbrista painters, such as Pancho Fierro and Francisco Javier Cortés, and the photographic studio of Eugenio Courret portrayed Juan José. His name became synonymous with "faggot" in the Peruvian political press of the 19th century, which speaks of the enormous visibility of this character, who is recognized in history as the first openly homosexual Peruvian figure.

== Biography ==
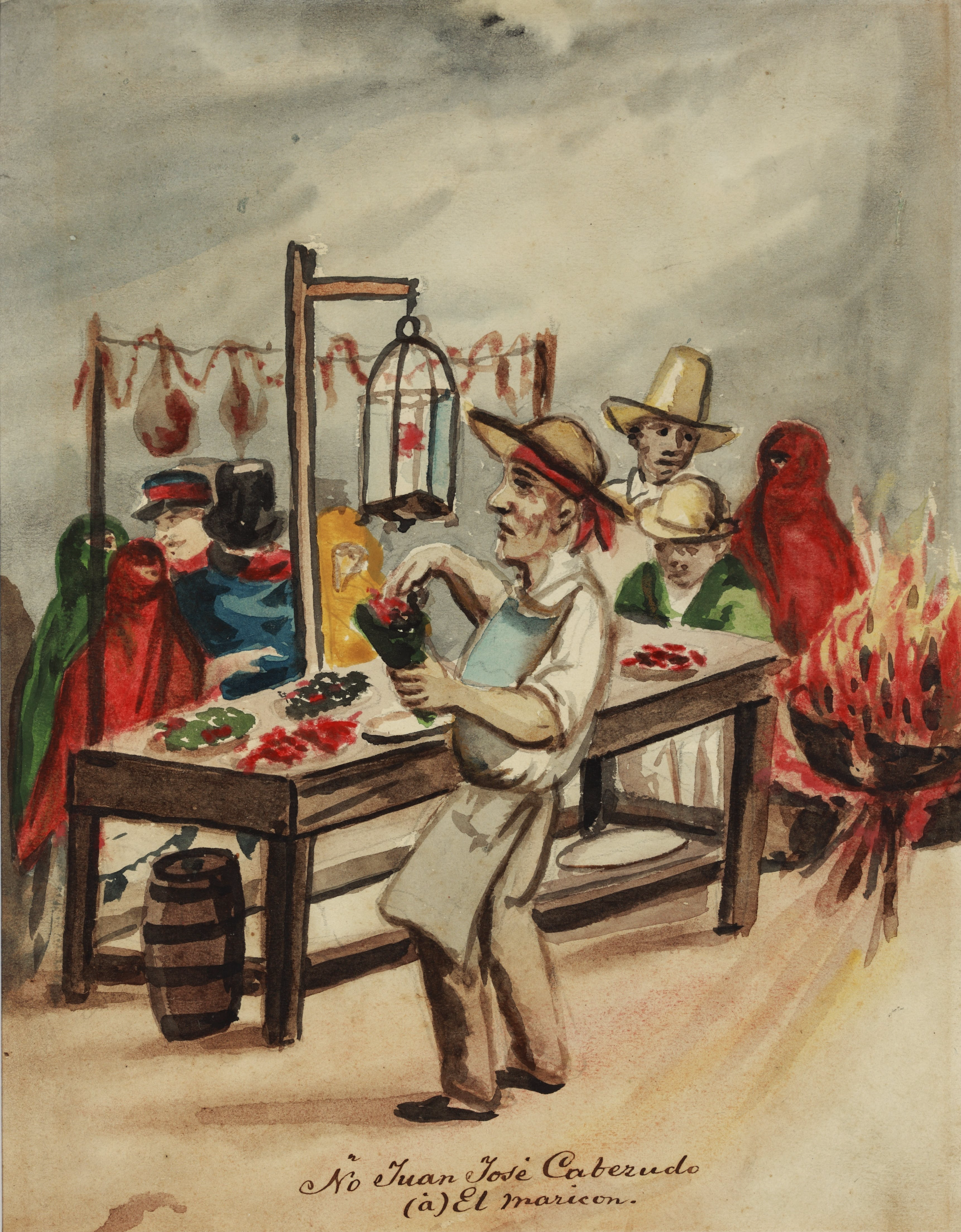
Pancho Fierro, Ño Juan José Cabezudo, a.k.a. El maricon.

Whilst little is known about Cabezudo's early life, he is recorded as being of African descent. However, more detail has been recorded about his career and personality. Cabezudo was a chef, who had a street-food stall in the Escribanos portal, a place very close to the Plaza Mayor in Lima, where he served typical Peruvian dishes, including tamales. He also had a food stall at the exit of the Acho bullring. When Simón Bolívar left Peru, Cabezudo was commissioned to cook the farewell dinner.

Cabezudo's food stalls were widely known in Lima at the time, and he was commercially successful. Nevertheless, he gambled much of his earnings in games of chance at the Chorrillos spa. His homosexuality was also discussed by writers and journalists during his life. According to historian Magally Alegre, Lima in the 19th century was a city where gay men could lead comparatively open lives.

According to historian Ricardo Palma, he died in Chorrillos in 1860, destitute.

== Historiography ==
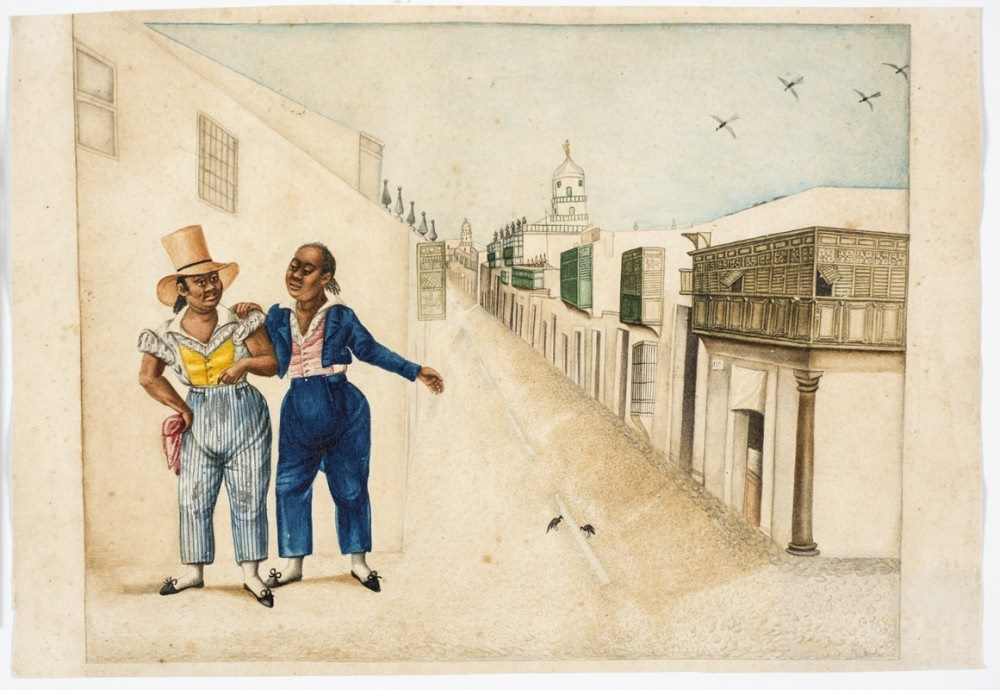
Juan José Cabezudo with a friend - Francisco Javier Cortés

Cabezudo's life was first recorded by Peruvian historian Ricardo Palma, who wrote a short biography about his fame, his homosexuality and his transvestism. The travel writer Max Radiguet mentions his life. He was also depicted in a series of watercolours by Francisco Fierro, as well as Francisco Javier Cortés, and was photographed by Eugenio Courret.
