= Léonce Angrand =

French painter and draughtsman

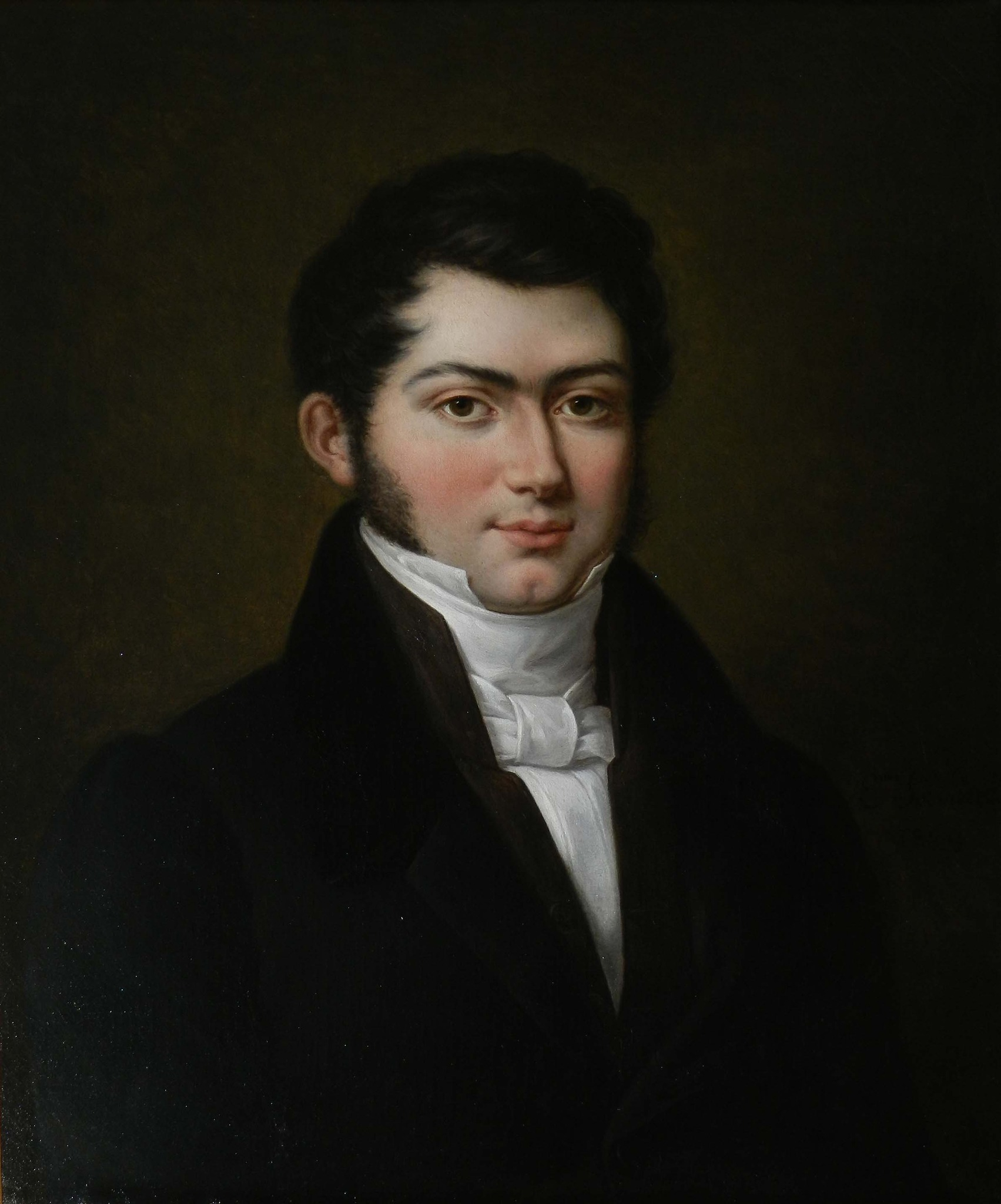
Portrait of Léonce Angrand by Eugénie Servières

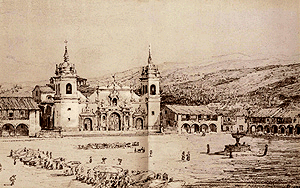
Historical view of colonial Ayacucho (c.1847)

Léonce Angrand (8 August 1808 - 11 March 1886) was a French painter and draughtsman. While serving as vice-consul in Lima, Angrand "Produced albums of watercolours and drawings of cities such as Arica, Arequipa, Lima, Cuzco, Ollantaytambo, Urubamba and Tacna". According to the National Library of France, Angrand served as Consul to Edinburgh 1832–1839, and to different locations in Latin America from 1839 to 1842 and 1845 to 1856.
