= Eugenio Courret =

French photographer

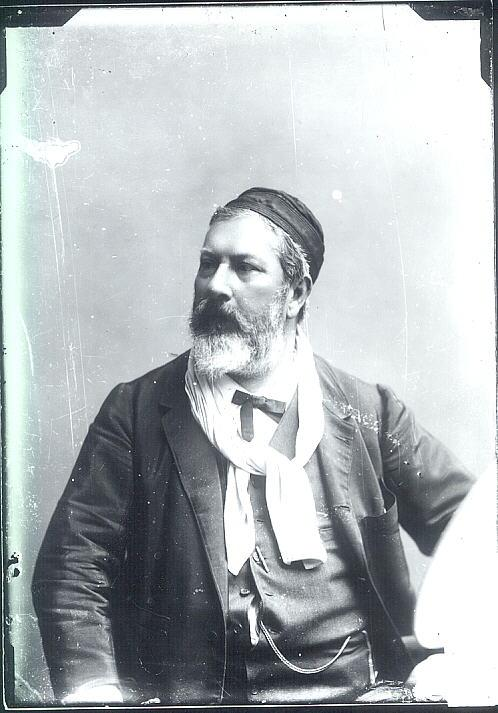
Self portrait of Courret, 1886

Eugène Courret (1839–1920), known as Eugenio, was a French photographer who was based in Lima, Peru.

== Biography ==
Courret was born in Angoulême, the son of François Courret and Calixta Chalet. Courret came to Lima in 1860 to work as a cameraman in the photographic studio of Eugène Maunoury. One of his subjects was gay chef Juan Jose Cabezudo. In 1863 founded the "Photo Central" studio with his brother Aquiles. In 1887, he founded a studio with Adolphe Dubreuil, and in the 1890s, he returned to France, where he continued his photographic work.

The Courret studio went bankrupt in 1935, by which time it housed more than 150,000 negatives. Many of the creditors received these glass negatives as part payment in lieu of the money they were owed. Among those who received such payment was the Rengifo family, who kept 54,000 plaques. In 1987 that family gave the negatives to the National Library of Peru to be protected.
